= Legislative districts of Zamboanga del Norte =

Philippine political representations

The legislative districts of Zamboanga del Norte are the representations of the province of Zamboanga del Norte in the various national legislatures of the Philippines. The province is currently represented in the lower house of the Congress of the Philippines through its first, second and third congressional districts.

== History ==
Prior to gaining separate representation, areas now under the jurisdiction of Zamboanga del Norte were represented under the Department of Mindanao and Sulu (1917–1935) and the historical Zamboanga Province (1935–1953).

The enactment of Republic Act No. 711 on June 6, 1952 divided the old Zamboanga Province into Zamboanga del Norte and Zamboanga del Sur and provided them each with a congressional representative. Zamboanga del Norte first elected its separate representative starting in the 1953 elections.

Even after receiving their own city charters, Dapitan and Dipolog remained part of the representation of the Province of Zamboanga del Norte by virtue of Section 80 of Republic Act No. 3811 (June 22, 1963) and Section 86 of Republic Act No. 5520 (June 21, 1969), respectively.

Zamboanga del Norte was represented in the Interim Batasang Pambansa as part of Region IX from 1978 to 1984, and returned two representatives, elected at-large, to the Regular Batasang Pambansa in 1984.

Under the new Constitution which was proclaimed on February 11, 1987, the province was reapportioned into three congressional districts; each elected its member to the restored House of Representatives starting that same year.

== Current districts ==
Zamboanga del Norte's current congressional delegation is composed of three members.

Lakas–CMD (2)
Liberal (1)

Legislative districts and representatives of Zamboanga del Norte
District	Current Representative		Party	Constituent LGUs	Population (2020)	Area	Map					
District	Image	Name	Party	Constituent LGUs	Population (2020)	Area	Map					
District	1st		Party	Constituent LGUs	Population (2020)	Area	Map	Roberto Uy Jr. (since 2023); Polanco	Lakas–CMD	List: Dapitan; La Libertad; Mutia; Piñan; Polanco; Rizal; Sergio Osmeña; Sibutad	231,980	1,536.29 km²
2nd		Irene Labadlabad (since 2025); Sindangan	Lakas–CMD	List: Dipolog; Jose Dalman; Katipunan; Manukan; Pres. Manuel A. Roxas; Siayan; Sindangan	427,956	2,018.6 km²						
3rd		Adrian Michael Amatong (since 2022); Liloy	Liberal	List: Bacungan; Baliguian; Godod; Gutalac; Kalawit; Labason; Liloy; Salug; Sibuco; Siocon; Sirawai; Tampilisan	387,519	3,746.11 km²						

== Historical districts ==
=== Lone District (defunct) ===
Period	Representative
3rd Congress; 1953–1957	Alberto Ubay
4th Congress; 1957–1961	Alberto Ubay
5th Congress; 1961–1965	Alberto Ubay
6th Congress; 1965–1969	Alberto Ubay
7th Congress; 1969–1972	Felipe B. Azcuna

=== At-Large (defunct) ===
Period	Representatives
Regular Batasang Pambansa; 1984–1986	Romeo G. Jalosjos
Regular Batasang Pambansa; 1984–1986	Guardson R. Lood

== See also ==
- Legislative districts of Mindanao and Sulu
- Legislative district of Zamboanga
- 2002 Zamboanga del Norte's 1st congressional district special election
- 2019 Zamboanga del Norte local elections
