= Lamao =

Lamao may refer to the following places in the Philippines:

- Lamao, barangay in the municipality of Liloy, Zamboanga del Norte
- Lamao, barangay in the municipality of Limay, Bataan
- Lamao, barangay in the municipality of Romblon, Romblon
