= Liloy =

Municipality in Zamboanga del Norte, Philippines

- Municipality
- Municipality of Liloy
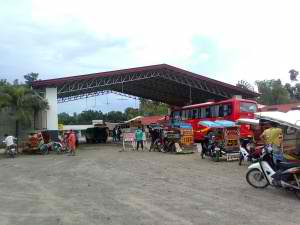
- Integrated Bus Terminal

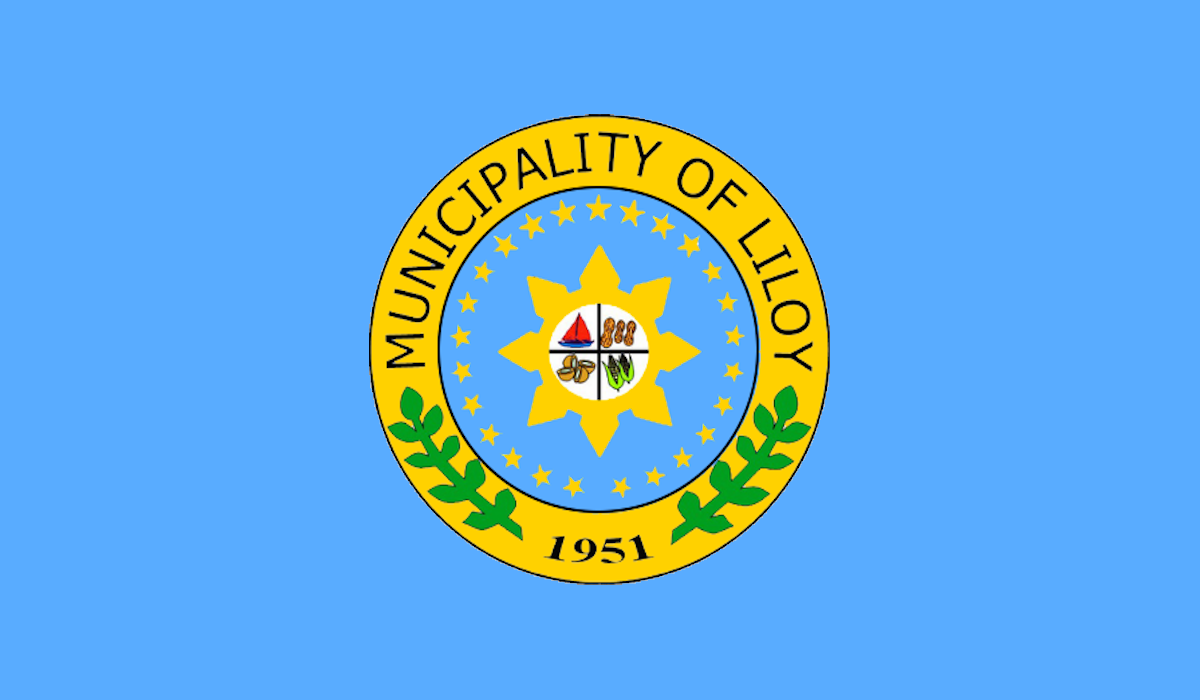
- Flag Seal
- Nickname: Peanut Capital of Zamboanga del Norte
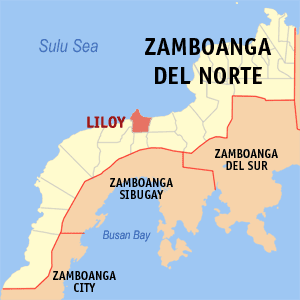
- Map of Zamboanga del Norte with Liloy highlighted
- Interactive map of Liloy
- Location within the Philippines
- Coordinates: 8°07′22″N 122°40′25″E
- Country: Philippines
- Region: Zamboanga Peninsula
- Province: Zamboanga del Norte
- District: 3rd district
- Founded: August 22, 1951
- Barangays: 37 (see Barangays)

Government
  - Type: Sangguniang Bayan
  - Mayor: Roberto L. Uy Jr. (Lakas)
  - Vice Mayor: John Momar T. Insong (Lakas)
  - Representative: Adrian Michael A. Amatong (Liberal)
  - Municipal Council: Members: Feliciano V. Bolando; Ronie R. Soria; Michelle S. Uy; Donald John U. Capili; Marilou G. Bihag; Francisco B. Alga; Flordaronnie T. Daarol; Rowilito B. Mejorada
  - Electorate: 32,607 voters (2025)

Area
  - Total: 128.43 km^{2} (49.59 sq mi)
- Elevation: 28 m (92 ft)
- Highest elevation: 97 m (318 ft)
- Lowest elevation: 0 m (0 ft)

Population (2024 census)
  - Total: 41,881
  - Density: 326.10/km^{2} (844.59/sq mi)
  - Households: 9,654

Economy
  - Income class: 2nd municipal income class
  - Poverty incidence: 42.91% (2023)
  - Revenue: ₱ 220.7 million (2024)
  - Assets: ₱ 554.6 million (2024)
  - Expenditure: ₱ 130.6 million (2024)
  - Liabilities: ₱ 187 million (2024)

Service provider
  - Electricity: Zamboanga del Norte Electric Cooperative (ZANECO)
  - Water: Liloy Water District (LWD)
- Time zone: UTC+8 (PST)
- ZIP code: 7115
- PSGC: 0907206000
- IDD : area code: +63 (0)65
- Native languages: Subanon; Cebuano; Chavacano; Tagalog
- Website: www.liloy.gov.ph

Liloy, officially the Municipality of Liloy (Cebuano: Lungsod sa Liloy; Subanen: Benwa Liloy; Chavacano: Municipalidad de Liloy; Tagalog: Bayan ng Liloy), is a municipality in the province of Zamboanga del Norte, Philippines. According to the 2024 census, it has a population of 41,881 people.

Liloy is mainly an agricultural community with an economy that relies mostly on crop production such as corn, rice, coconuts, peanuts, and root crops. It is known as the "Peanut Capital of Zamboanga del Norte".

== History ==
Before its municipal jurisdiction, Liloy was once a barrio of the municipality of Sindangan in the old Zamboanga province. By virtue of Executive Order No. 469 issued by President Elpidio Quirino on August 22, 1951, the municipality of Liloy was organized, separated from Sindangan. The municipality contains Barrio Liloy, designated as the seat of the government, and eight sitios. It was inaugurated on December 16 of the same year. The first municipal mayor of Liloy was Arsenia Almonte Teves.

The seat of the municipal government had been transferred at least twice—to Timan and to Upper Liloy Beach.

Liloy subsequently lost large portions of its territory when two separate municipalities were created.

By virtue of Republic Act No. 2510 enacted in 1959, eleven barrios were separated to establish Salug.

By virtue of Batas Pambansa Blg. 14 approved in 1978, seven barangays were separated to establish Tampilisan.

== Geography ==
Liloy's total area is 12,843 hectares (31,740 acres), 78% of which is an agricultural land planted with coconuts, corn, rice, root crops and some rubber trees. According to the records of the Municipal Assessor's office, 22% of the municipality's territory comprise the residential area which is sixty-five (65); commercial, nine (9); industrial, in Barangay Timan and Santa Cruz, ten (10); institutional land, fifty (50); public school sites(?); and wharf, eight hundred sixty (860) hectares. There are also open areas for road right of way of public highways and roads traversing in the different barangays of the municipality.

It lies on the north-western side of the Zamboanga peninsula, bounded in the north by the Sulu Sea; south, the municipality of Tampilisan; east, the municipality of Salug; and west, the municipality of Labason.

=== Climate ===
Climate data for Liloy, Zamboanga del Norte
Month	Jan	Feb	Mar	Apr	May	Jun	Jul	Aug	Sep	Oct	Nov	Dec	Year
Mean daily maximum °C (°F)	29 (84)	30 (86)	30 (86)	31 (88)	30 (86)	29 (84)	29 (84)	29 (84)	29 (84)	29 (84)	29 (84)	29 (84)	29 (85)
Mean daily minimum °C (°F)	23 (73)	23 (73)	23 (73)	24 (75)	25 (77)	25 (77)	24 (75)	24 (75)	25 (77)	25 (77)	24 (75)	23 (73)	24 (75)
Average precipitation mm (inches)	96 (3.8)	79 (3.1)	117 (4.6)	127 (5.0)	239 (9.4)	301 (11.9)	286 (11.3)	283 (11.1)	255 (10.0)	272 (10.7)	188 (7.4)	115 (4.5)	2,358 (92.8)
Average rainy days	17.3	16.0	19.7	21.6	29.0	29.0	29.7	29.1	28.5	28.9	25.3	20.0	294.1
Source: Meteoblue

There are two distinct seasons, the dry and the rainy. Usually, the rainy season starts from the month of June and ends in December while the dry season occurs in the months of January to May. Typhoon comes rarely in this area because it is not within the typhoon belt.

=== Barangays ===
Liloy is politically subdivided into 37 barangays. Each barangay consists of puroks while some have sitios.

The sitios of Silucap, Bacong, Libertad, Balacan, Tampilisan, Cabangkalan, Tambalang, and Kayoc were elevated into barrios in 1955.

- Banigan
- Baybay (poblacion)
- Cabangcalan
- Canaan
- Candelaria
- Causwagan
- Communal
- Compra
- Dela Paz
- El Paraiso
- Fatima
- Ganase
- Goaw
- Goin
- Kayok
- La Libertad (Mawal)
- Lamao
- Mabuhay
- Maigang
- Malila
- Mauswagon
- New Bethlehem
- Overview
- Panabang
- Patawag
- Punta
- San Francisco
- San Isidro
- San Miguel
- San Roque
- Santa Cruz
- Santo Niño
- Silucap
- Tapican
- Timan
- Villa Calixto Sudiacal
- Villa M. Tejero

== Demographics ==
Population census of Liloy
Year	Pop.	±% p.a.
1960	14,932	—
1970	26,449	+5.88%
1975	33,328	+4.75%
1980	34,841	+0.89%
1990	29,807	−1.55%
1995	32,417	+1.59%
2000	33,702	+0.84%
2007	36,948	+1.28%
2010	39,015	+2.00%
2015	39,812	+0.39%
2020	42,213	+1.24%
2024	41,881	−0.19%
Source: Philippine Statistics Authority

Indigenous people/tribal community: Subanon

=== Religion ===
Major Religion:	Percentage
Roman Catholic	87.28%
Islam	2.00%
Iglesia ni Cristo	1.06%
Seventh Day Adventist	0.66%
Jehovah's Witness	0.07%
Aglipay	1.00%
UCCP	2.15%
Others	5.02%
Not Stated	0.76%

== Economy ==
Poverty incidence of Liloy (%)

Source: Philippine Statistics Authority

== Culture ==
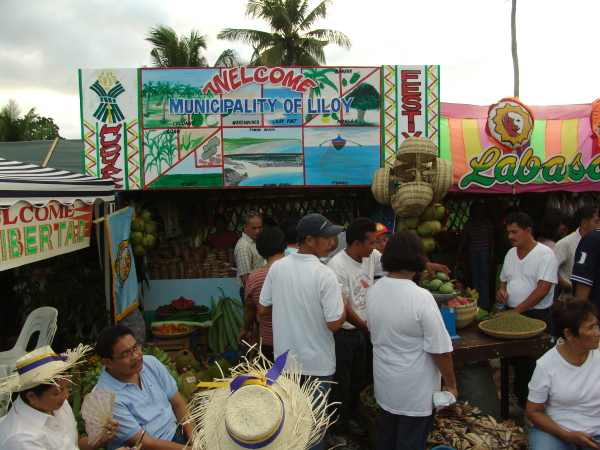
Liloy Booth at Hudyaka Zanorte Festival

Liloy's Alay Festival was once a private-funded festival by the Tan family in Barangay Fatima to honor Nuestra Señora Birhen de Regla. At present, it is one of the most celebrated festivals in the town. The Local Government Officials contribute and show support financially and morally for the said activity.

The Araw ng Liloy starts on the 22nd day of August every year. Also known as Linggo ng Liloy, the celebration is held for a week. It is highlighted by a Beauty Pageant to select the Mutya ng Liloy

== Tourism ==
Tourism is centered on its growing developments along the beaches in the Barangays of Patawag, Banigan, Santa Cruz, Timan, and Punta, catering to white sand beaches and corals. Barangay Baybay, the seat of trade and commerce in the town, has also rapidly boomed in trade, industry, education and commerce.

The under-construction two-floor market with an escalator will be the first in the province.

== Government ==
Liloy is governed by a mayor, a vice mayor and eight councilors. Each official is elected publicly to a three-year term. The chief of the Association of Barangay Captains and the President of the Sangguniang Kabataan Federation are also among the members of the municipal council.

Roberto L. Uy, Jr. is the current mayor of the municipality, and John Momar T. Insong is the town's vice mayor.

=== Municipal Hall ===
The Municipal Hall is a two-story Batangas-type building built in the late 1950s; repaired in 1987. A one-story annex municipal building was constructed in 1965 and later, repaired in 1990.

== Transportation ==
Liloy can be reached from the capital city of Dipolog by overland transportation via the National Highway. The highway is parallel to the coast with a distance of 132 kilometres (82 mi). From Liloy to Zamboanga City at the very tip of the peninsula is 184 kilometres (114 mi).

Bus terminals for land transportation are situated at down and uptown area (Barangay Fatima).

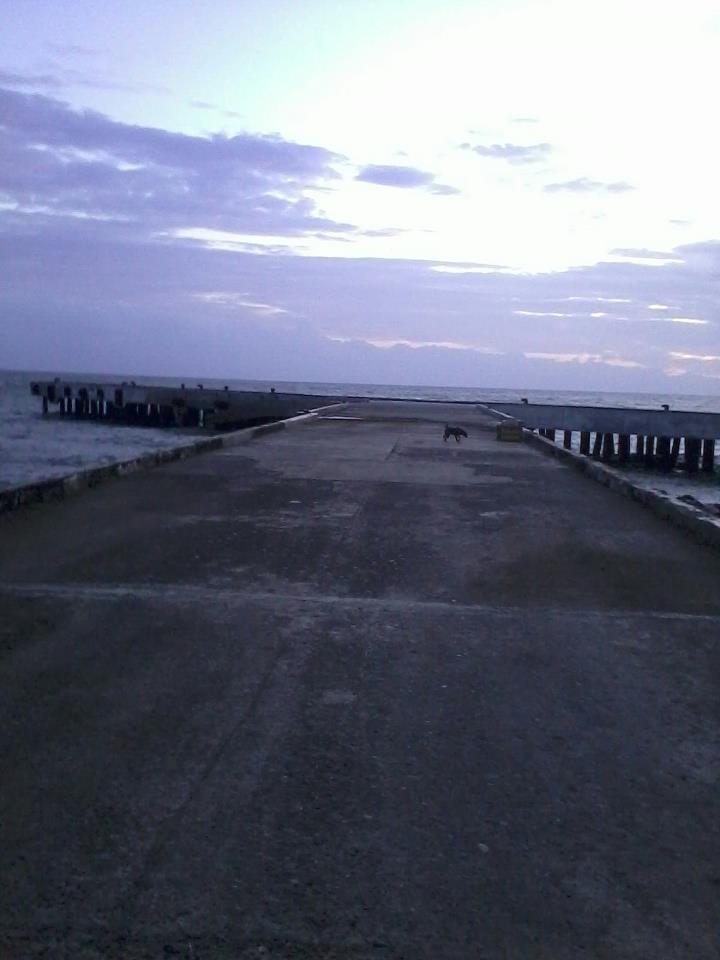
Central view of the seaport

=== Liloy Seaport ===
The port is situated at barangay Lamao and currently managed under the Philippine Ports of Authority (PPA).

=== Liloy Airport ===
Liloy Airport is an airport serving the general area of Liloy. It is classified as a feeder airport by the Air Transportation Office, and under the jurisdiction of the Civil Aviation Authority of the Philippines.

It is one of the three domestic airports in the province, located in Barangay Comunal. It was first developed in 1950 under the administration of Mayor Aquilino Bomediano Sr. The first OIC of Liloy Airport was Tony Macias, a Filipino-American citizen.

Between the years 1960 to 1970, three twelve-seater PAL planes served their flights to domestic destinations like Dipolog, Cebu and Davao. Its usable runway length is 600 metres (2,000 ft) with a total of 1,200 metres (3,900 ft).

Current OIC of Liloy Airport is Edwardo Toledo. Private and government charter planes and helicopters usually land at the airport.

== Education ==
=== Liloy I District ===
Elementary

- Liloy CS
- Banigan ES
- Comunal ES
- Ganase ES
- Gayam ES
- Lamao ES
- Mabuhay ES
- Maigang ES
- New Bethlehem ES
- Patawag ES
- Punta ES
- Santa Cruz ES
- San Miguel ES
- Silucap ES
- Tapican ES
- Villa C. Sudiacal ES

Secondary

- Patawag National High School - is formerly Liloy NHS - Patawag Extension located at the municipality's barangay of Patawag.

=== Liloy II District ===
Elementary

- Baybay CS
- Baybay SPED Center
- Canaan PS
- Candelaria ES
- Dela Paz ES
- Kayok ES
- Libertad ES
- Santo Niño PS
- Timan ES

Secondary

- Liloy National High School - is a public institution of learning for high school students in the municipality. Its primary goal is to provide quality instruction to pursue the goals of Secondary Education as a link to tertiary level.

=== Liloy III District ===
Elementary

- Compra ES
- Cabangcalan ES
- Causwagan ES
- El Paraiso ES
- Goaw ES
- Goin ES
- Malila 'L' ES
- Mauswagon ES
- Overview ES
- Panabang ES
- San Francisco ES
- San Isidro ES
- San Roque ES

Secondary

- Compra National High School - is a former extension campus of the Liloy NHS located at barangay Compra, a southern part of the municipality along the National Highway. It caters students from its neighboring feeder elementary schools located in the municipalities of Liloy, Tampilisan and Kalawit.

=== Private Schools ===
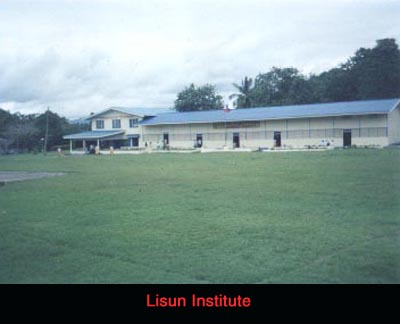
Lisun Institute now Philippine Advent College-Liloy Campus

Lisun Institute - is a private institute located in the heart of the Barangay Fatima, near the Fatima Public Market. It also offers some College courses which was founded in the 1960s.

Liloy Immanuel School - is a private school in Liloy founded by CAMACOP.

Ave Maria College- is the first and so far the only Catholic tertiary school in the town.

Assumption of Mary Parochial School, Inc.

Higher Ground Baptist School
