= Baliguian =

Municipality in Zamboanga del Norte, Philippines

- Municipality
- Municipality of Baliguian
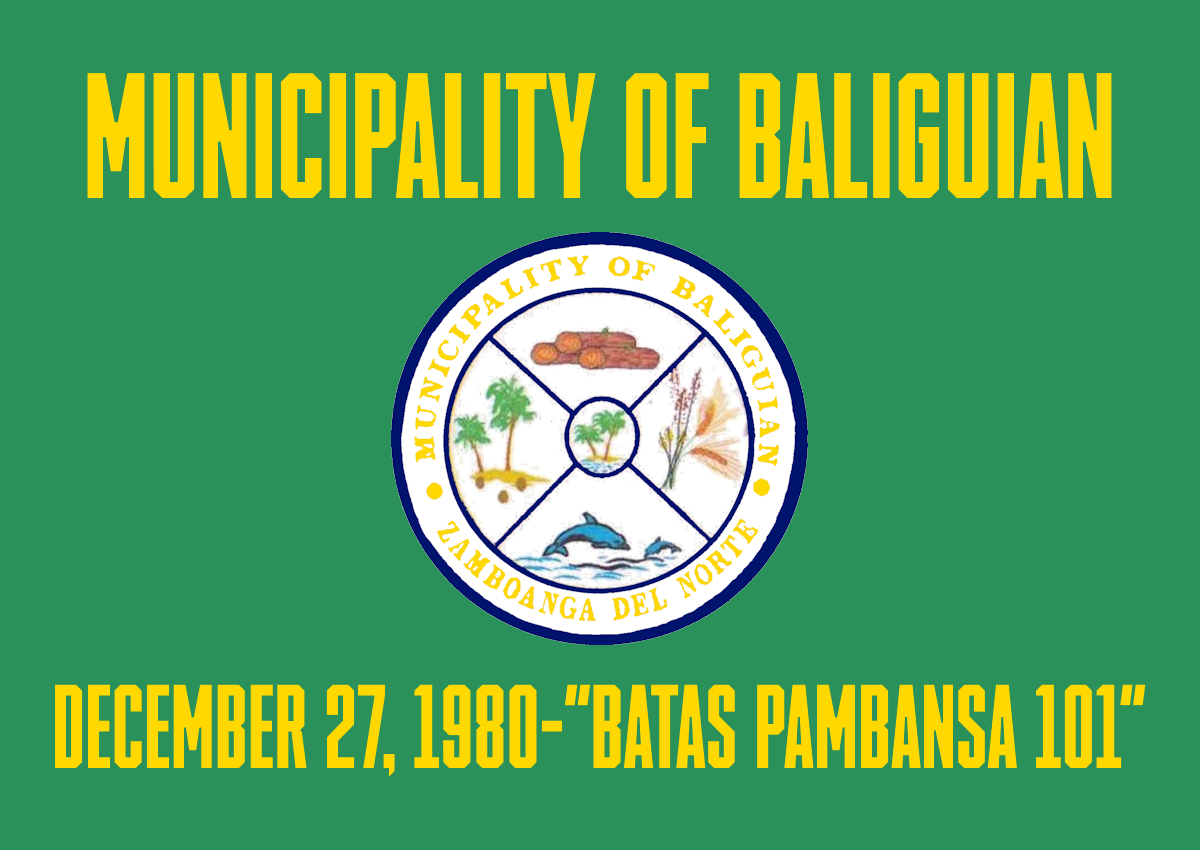
- Flag Seal
- Nickname: Home of the Philippine Eagle
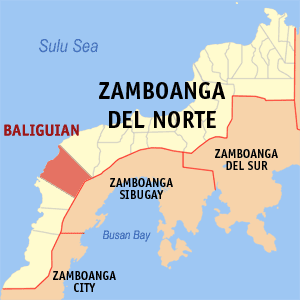
- Map of Zamboanga del Norte with Baliguian highlighted
- Interactive map of Baliguian
- Location within the Philippines
- Coordinates: 7°48′32″N 122°08′43″E
- Country: Philippines
- Region: Zamboanga Peninsula
- Province: Zamboanga del Norte
- District: 3rd district
- Founded: April 7, 1981
- Barangays: 17 (see Barangays)

Government
  - Type: Sangguniang Bayan
  - Mayor: Gani A. Esmali, Jr. (PFP)
  - Vice Mayor: Cresencio B. Suson (Lakas)
  - Representative: Adrian Michael A. Amatong (Liberal)
  - Municipal Council: Members: Abdul Aziz A. Esmali; Rosemarie S. Abog; Hermicio M. Neri; Dulcisimo S. Bontia, Jr.; Hadji Nalil L. Alih; Absari J. Salbani; Cristina A. Mendoza; Jover L. Nalug
  - Electorate: 15,352 voters (2025)

Area
  - Total: 439.26 km^{2} (169.60 sq mi)
- Elevation: 112 m (367 ft)
- Highest elevation: 599 m (1,965 ft)
- Lowest elevation: 0 m (0 ft)

Population (2024 census)
  - Total: 25,585
  - Density: 58.246/km^{2} (150.86/sq mi)
  - Households: 5,644

Economy
  - Income class: 1st municipal income class
  - Poverty incidence: 50.75% (2023)
  - Revenue: ₱ 214.6 million (2024)
  - Assets: ₱ 686.2 million (2024)
  - Expenditure: ₱ 95.04 million (2024)

Service provider
  - Electricity: Zamboanga del Sur 2 Electric Cooperative (ZAMSURECO 2)
- Time zone: UTC+8 (PST)
- ZIP code: 7123
- PSGC: 0907224000
- IDD : area code: +63 (0)65
- Native languages: Subanon; Cebuano; Chavacano; Tagalog
- Website: baliguian.zamboangadelnorte.com

Baliguian, officially the Municipality of Baliguian (Cebuano: Lungsod sa Baliguian; Subanen: Benwa Baliguian; Chavacano: Municipalidad de Baliguian; Tagalog: Bayan ng Baliguian), is a municipality in the province of Zamboanga del Norte, Philippines. According to the 2024 census, it has a population of 25,585 people.

== Etymology ==
Historically, the town was a trading place for the barter and sale of goods for the inhabitants, people from neighboring towns, and frequenting Chinese businesspeople. Possibly taken from the Visayan term "baligya" or "to sell (something)," the place was given the name Baliguian.

== History ==
Through Batas Pambansa Blg. 101 passed on December 20, 1980, the town was to be carved out from the northern portion of Siocon. Forming the then-newly created town were barangays Baliguian, Milidan, Alegria, Diculom, Kauswagan, San Jose, Nonoyan, and the sitios of Mamad, Diangas, Tidas, Linay, Balaboan, Balobok, Tamao, Siasi, Micubol, Mamawan, and Bangaan. A plebiscite was called on March 16, 1981 by President Ferdinand Marcos Sr. through Proclamation No. 2069, and the town's creation was approved and ratified on April 7, 1981, marking the birth of the town known as Baliguian. By September 7, 1981, almost five months since its creation, its first set of leaders were appointed with Casiano Lim and Paster Neri designated as mayor and vice mayor, respectively.

== Geography ==
Baliguian is being bordered by the Sulu Sea to the northwest, Gutalac to the northeast, Siocon to the southwest, and Zamboanga Sibugay to the town's south and east areas, particularly Tungawan to the southeast and Roseller T. Lim to the east.

=== Barangays ===
Baliguian is politically subdivided into 17 barangays. Each barangay consists of puroks while some have sitios.

- Alegria
- Diangas
- Diculom
- Guimotan
- Kauswagan
- Kilalaban
- Linay
- Lumay
- Malinao
- Mamad
- Mamawan
- Milidan
- Nonoyan
- Poblacion
- San Jose
- Tamao
- Tan-awan

=== Climate ===
Climate data for Baliguian, Zamboanga del Norte
Month	Jan	Feb	Mar	Apr	May	Jun	Jul	Aug	Sep	Oct	Nov	Dec	Year
Mean daily maximum °C (°F)	30 (86)	30 (86)	31 (88)	31 (88)	30 (86)	29 (84)	29 (84)	29 (84)	29 (84)	29 (84)	30 (86)	30 (86)	30 (86)
Mean daily minimum °C (°F)	23 (73)	23 (73)	24 (75)	25 (77)	25 (77)	25 (77)	24 (75)	24 (75)	25 (77)	25 (77)	24 (75)	24 (75)	24 (76)
Average precipitation mm (inches)	98 (3.9)	78 (3.1)	116 (4.6)	115 (4.5)	222 (8.7)	281 (11.1)	272 (10.7)	282 (11.1)	237 (9.3)	258 (10.2)	180 (7.1)	108 (4.3)	2,247 (88.6)
Average rainy days	19.6	18.6	21.8	22.9	29.0	28.6	28.7	28.3	27.0	28.6	25.9	22.1	301.1
Source: Meteoblue

== Demographics ==
Population census of Baliguian
Year	Pop.	±% p.a.
1990	8,957	—
1995	12,671	+6.72%
2000	15,631	+4.60%
2007	20,540	+3.84%
2010	21,190	+1.14%
2015	22,588	+1.22%
2020	23,771	+1.08%
2024	25,585	+1.78%
Source: Philippine Statistics Authority

== Economy ==
Poverty incidence of Baliguian (%)

Source: Philippine Statistics Authority

== Government ==
Mayors of the
Municipality of Baliguian
Casiano Q. Lim, 1981-1986
Paster P. Neri, 1986-1988
Feliciano S. Chiong, 1988-1995
Teofilo B. Suson, 1995-2004
Gani A. Esmali, 2004-2013
Albina A. Esmali, 2013-2022
Gani A. Esmali, Jr., 2022-present

Baliguian's local government structure is composed of one mayor, one vice mayor and eight councilors, named as Sangguniang Bayan members, all elected through popular vote. Three ex officio members are added to the Sangguniang Bayan with one representing Baliguian's 17 Barangay Captains being the Association of Barangay Councils (ABC) President, and one representing Baliguian's 17 Barangay Youth Council Presidents being the Sangunniang Kabataan (SK) Federation President. Each official, with the exemption of the ABC and SK Presidents, is elected publicly to a 3-year term and can be re-elected up to 3 terms in succession.
