= Godod =

Municipality in Zamboanga del Norte, Philippines

- Municipality
- Municipality of Godod
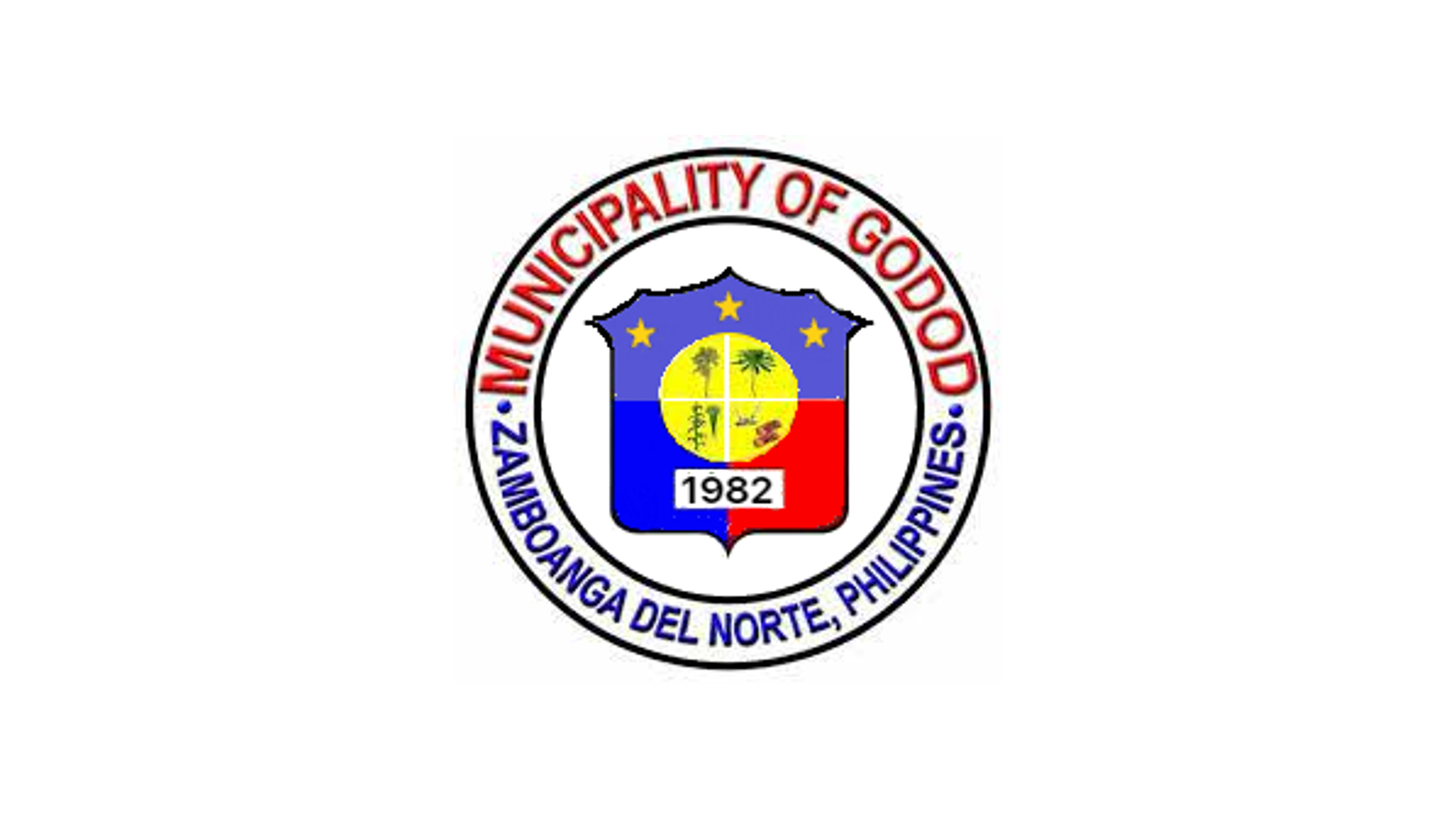
- Flag Seal
- Nickname: Heart of the Peninsula
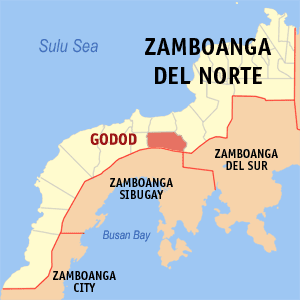
- Map of Zamboanga del Norte with Godod highlighted
- Interactive map of Godod
- Location within the Philippines
- Coordinates: 8°00′05″N 122°50′38″E
- Country: Philippines
- Region: Zamboanga Peninsula
- Province: Zamboanga del Norte
- District: 3rd district
- Founded: February 8, 1982
- Barangays: 17 (see Barangays)

Government
  - Type: Sangguniang Bayan
  - Mayor: Richie L. Uy (Lakas)
  - Vice Mayor: Roldan C. Molate (Lakas)
  - Representative: Adrian Michael A. Amatong (Liberal)
  - Municipal Council: Members: Rolly U. Mangan; Hermocilla M. Buhale; Edgar A. Antao; Rafael P. Ajero; Richard C. Bicoy; Rolando S. Pabatao, Jr.; Sergio A. Albot; Renato C. Barbarona
  - Electorate: 12,256 voters (2025)

Area
  - Total: 190.00 km^{2} (73.36 sq mi)
- Elevation: 314 m (1,030 ft)
- Highest elevation: 599 m (1,965 ft)
- Lowest elevation: 153 m (502 ft)

Population (2024 census)
  - Total: 18,040
  - Density: 94.95/km^{2} (245.9/sq mi)
  - Households: 4,217

Economy
  - Income class: 3rd municipal income class
  - Poverty incidence: 54.43% (2023)
  - Revenue: ₱ 142.4 million (2024)
  - Assets: ₱ 465.9 million (2024)
  - Expenditure: ₱ 50.22 million (2024)
  - Liabilities: ₱ 240.9 million (2024)

Service provider
  - Electricity: Zamboanga del Norte Electric Cooperative (ZANECO)
- Time zone: UTC+8 (PST)
- ZIP code: 7100
- PSGC: 0907225000
- IDD : area code: +63 (0)65
- Native languages: Subanon; Cebuano; Chavacano; Tagalog
- Website: godod.zamboangadelnorte.com

Godod, officially the Municipality of Godod (Cebuano: Lungsod sa Godod; Subanen: Benwa Godod; Chavacano: Municipalidad de Godod; Tagalog: Bayan ng Godod), is a municipality in the province of Zamboanga del Norte, Philippines. According to the 2024 census, it has a population of 18,040 people.

== History ==
In the early 20th century, the town was a Subanen village led by a prosperous farmer and chieftain named Ginowa, who performed an annual planting ritual called “Godod,” meaning “pouring of graces.” During the ritual, he poured water onto the floor of his granary, and villagers believed that whoever received the first drop would enjoy a bountiful harvest like his. The practice attracted participants from nearby communities and became an important local tradition. After Ginowa’s death, the village was named Godod in his honor. Over time, the village became a barangay under the municipality of Salug and later served as the center of the Zamboanga del Norte Resettlement Project, hosting the field office of the Department of Agrarian Reform.

Through Batas Pambansa Blg. 146 which was approved on February 8, 1982, twelve barangays in southern Salug were carved out to establish Godod, with one with the same name to be the seat of government. A plebiscite for ratification, along with ten more newly-created local entities including nearby Bacungan, was held on May 17, coinciding with the barangay elections.

On September 29, 1983, New People's Army guerrillas ambushed government troops in a mountainous area near Godod village, leaving 39 soldiers and seven civilians dead, and wounding eight others, in one of the worst communist attacks.

== Geography ==
=== Barangays ===
Godod is politically subdivided into 17 barangays. Each barangay consists of puroks while some have sitios.

- Baluno
- Banuangan
- Bunawan
- Delucot
- Dipopor
- Guisapong
- Limbonga (Limboangan)
- Lomogom
- Mauswagon
- Miampic
- Poblacion
- Raba
- Rambon
- San Pedro
- Sarawagan
- Sianan
- Sioran

=== Climate ===
Climate data for Godod, Zamboanga del Norte
Month	Jan	Feb	Mar	Apr	May	Jun	Jul	Aug	Sep	Oct	Nov	Dec	Year
Mean daily maximum °C (°F)	28 (82)	28 (82)	29 (84)	29 (84)	28 (82)	27 (81)	27 (81)	27 (81)	27 (81)	27 (81)	27 (81)	28 (82)	28 (82)
Mean daily minimum °C (°F)	21 (70)	21 (70)	21 (70)	22 (72)	23 (73)	23 (73)	23 (73)	22 (72)	23 (73)	23 (73)	22 (72)	22 (72)	22 (72)
Average precipitation mm (inches)	96 (3.8)	79 (3.1)	117 (4.6)	127 (5.0)	239 (9.4)	301 (11.9)	286 (11.3)	283 (11.1)	255 (10.0)	272 (10.7)	188 (7.4)	115 (4.5)	2,358 (92.8)
Average rainy days	17.3	16.0	19.7	21.6	29.0	29.0	29.7	29.1	28.5	28.9	25.3	20.0	294.1
Source: Meteoblue

== Demographics ==
Population census of Godod
Year	Pop.	±% p.a.
1990	11,830	—
1995	15,053	+4.62%
2000	15,139	+0.12%
2007	16,638	+1.31%
2010	17,788	+2.46%
2015	17,424	−0.39%
2020	17,510	+0.10%
2024	18,040	+0.72%
Source: Philippine Statistics Authority

== Economy ==
Poverty incidence of Godod (%)

Source: Philippine Statistics Authority

== Government ==
Mayors of the
Municipality of Godod
Jesus V. Te, 1982-1986, 1988-1998
Tambaba Gumanlod, 1986-1987
Tomas P. Pacatang, 1987-1988
Erlinda N. Lim-Te, 1998-2007
Rolando L. Te, 2007-2016
Abel M. Matildo, 2016-2025
Richie L. Uy, 2025-present

Godod's local government structure is composed of one mayor, one vice mayor and eight councilors, named as Sangguniang Bayan members, all elected through popular vote. Three ex officio members are added to the Sangguniang Bayan with one representing Godod's 17 Barangay Captains being the Association of Barangay Councils (ABC) President, and one representing Godod's 17 Barangay Youth Council Presidents being the Sangguniang Kabataan (SK) Federation President. Each official, with the exemption of the ABC and SK Presidents, is elected publicly to a 3-year term and can be re-elected up to 3 terms in succession.
