= Sibuco =

Municipality in Zamboanga del Norte, Philippines

- Municipality
- Municipality of Sibuco
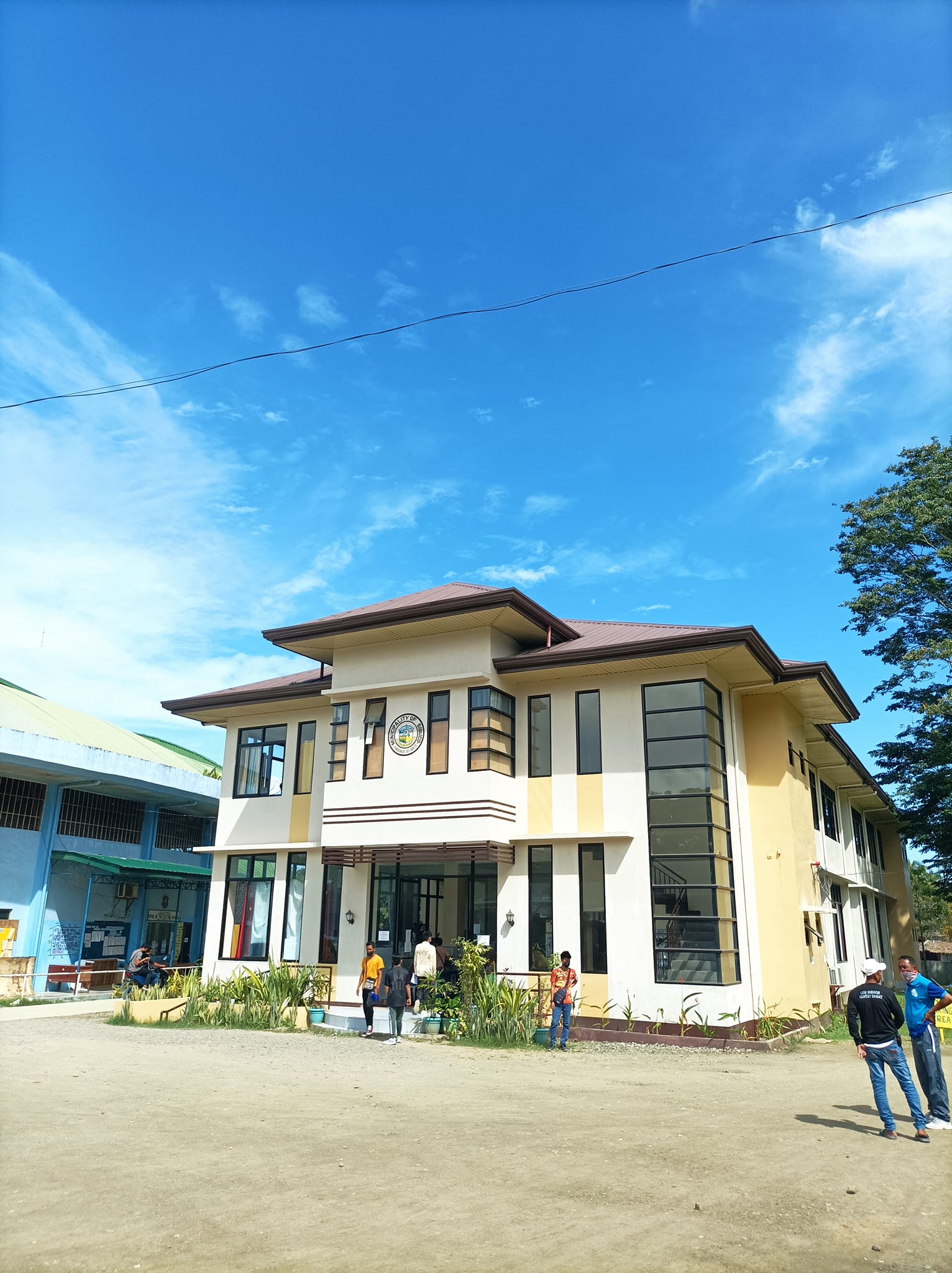
- New municipal hall building, 2022.

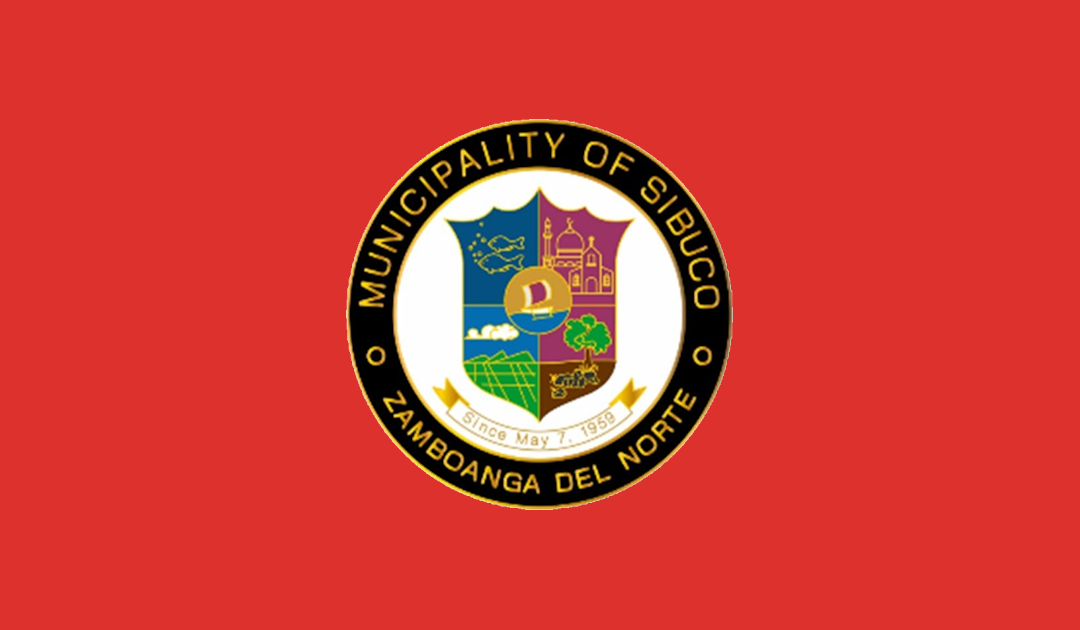
- Flag Seal
- Nickname: Last Frontier of Zamboanga del Norte
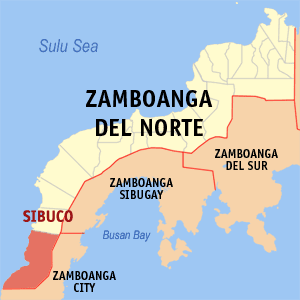
- Map of Zamboanga del Norte with Sibuco highlighted
- Interactive map of Sibuco
- Location within the Philippines
- Coordinates: 7°17′34″N 122°04′01″E
- Country: Philippines
- Region: Zamboanga Peninsula
- Province: Zamboanga del Norte
- District: 3rd district
- Founded: May 7, 1959
- Barangays: 28 (see Barangays)

Government
  - Type: Sangguniang Bayan
  - Mayor: Joel M. Ventura (Lakas)
  - Vice Mayor: Absar A. Caril (Lakas)
  - Representative: Adrian Michael A. Amatong (Liberal)
  - Municipal Council: Members: Sani P. Atani; Aldeshir E. Naing; Khadija S. Payao; Hakim J. Tarang; Luz D. Udah; Yasser E. Julwadi; Julius T. Pascua; Arnel L. Biong
  - Electorate: 33,122 voters (2025)

Area
  - Total: 782.54 km^{2} (302.14 sq mi)
- Elevation: 183 m (600 ft)
- Highest elevation: 652 m (2,139 ft)
- Lowest elevation: 0 m (0 ft)

Population (2024 census)
  - Total: 37,883
  - Density: 48.410/km^{2} (125.38/sq mi)
  - Households: 8,074

Economy
  - Income class: 1st municipal income class, 1st municipal income class
  - Poverty incidence: 50.93% (2023)
  - Revenue: ₱ 328.3 million (2024)
  - Assets: ₱ 860.1 million (2024)
  - Expenditure: ₱ 177.9 million (2024)
  - Liabilities: ₱ 258.2 million (2024)

Service provider
  - Electricity: Zamboanga del Sur 2 Electric Cooperative (ZAMSURECO 2)
  - Water: Sibuco Water District (SIWAD)
- Time zone: UTC+8 (PST)
- ZIP code: 7122
- PSGC: 0907216000
- IDD : area code: +63 (0)65
- Native languages: Northern Subanen; Chavacano; Cebuano; Tagalog; Tausug
- Website: sibuco.gov.ph

Sibuco, officially the Municipality of Sibuco (Cebuano: Lungsod sa Sibuco; Subanen: Benwa Sibuco; Sinama: Lahat Sibuco; Tausūg: Kawman sin Sibuco; Zamboangueño: Municipalidad de Sibuco; Tagalog: Bayan ng Sibuco), is a municipality in the province of Zamboanga del Norte, Philippines. According to the 2024 census, it has a population of 37,883 people.

It is regarded as a suburb of neighboring Zamboanga City.

== History ==
Sibuco as a municipality was established on May 7, 1959 based on Republic Act No. 2195 Legislative Enactment by Congress.

In 2023, the Department of Social Welfare and Development of the Zamboanga Peninsula (DSWD-9) identified Sibuco is the poorest town in the region, with a poverty rate of 91.41%. This is the second time since 2015 that Sibuco has been designated as the poorest town in the region.

== Geography ==
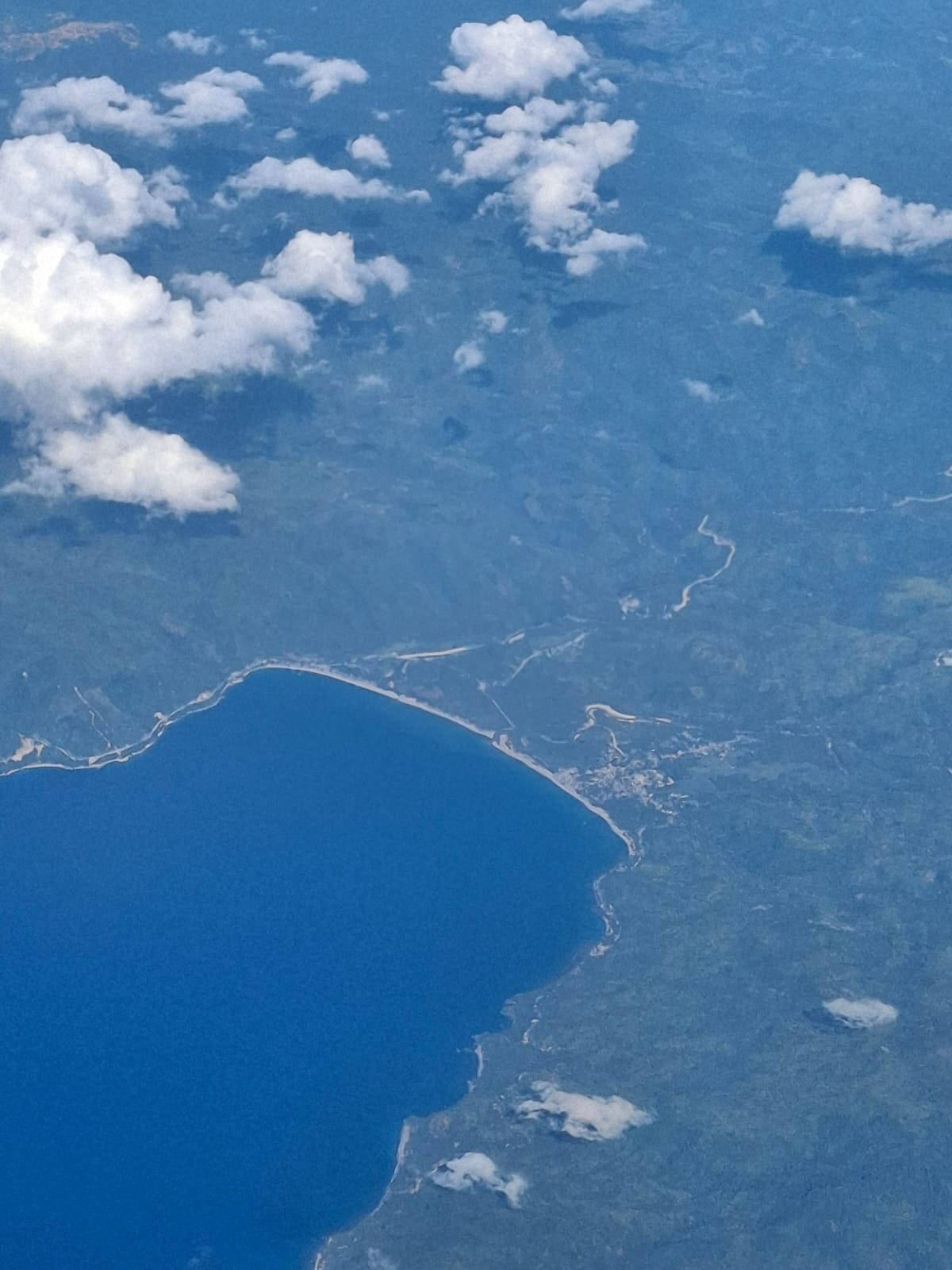
Aerial view of Sibuco Bay (December 2025)

=== Barangays ===
Sibuco is politically subdivided into 29 barangays. Each barangay consists of puroks while some have sitios.

- Anongan
- Basak
- Bongalao
- Cabbunan
- Cawit-cawit
- Culaguan
- Cusipan
- Dinulan
- Jatian
- Kamarangan
- Lakiki
- Lambagoan
- Limpapa
- Lingayon
- Lintangan
- Litawan
- Lunday
- Malayal
- Mantivo
- Molog
- Nala (Poblacion)
- Panganuran
- Pangian
- Paniran
- Pasilnahut
- Poblacion
- Puliran
- Santo Niño (Culabog)
- Tangarak

=== Climate ===
Climate data for Sibuco, Zamboanga del Norte
Month	Jan	Feb	Mar	Apr	May	Jun	Jul	Aug	Sep	Oct	Nov	Dec	Year
Mean daily maximum °C (°F)	30 (86)	30 (86)	31 (88)	31 (88)	30 (86)	29 (84)	29 (84)	29 (84)	29 (84)	29 (84)	30 (86)	30 (86)	30 (86)
Mean daily minimum °C (°F)	23 (73)	23 (73)	24 (75)	25 (77)	25 (77)	25 (77)	24 (75)	24 (75)	25 (77)	25 (77)	24 (75)	24 (75)	24 (76)
Average precipitation mm (inches)	98 (3.9)	78 (3.1)	116 (4.6)	115 (4.5)	222 (8.7)	281 (11.1)	272 (10.7)	282 (11.1)	237 (9.3)	258 (10.2)	180 (7.1)	108 (4.3)	2,247 (88.6)
Average rainy days	19.6	18.6	21.8	22.9	29.0	28.6	28.7	28.3	27.0	28.6	25.9	22.1	301.1
Source: Meteoblue

== Demographics ==
Population census of Sibuco
Year	Pop.	±% p.a.
1918	3,213	—
1960	6,323	+1.62%
1970	14,257	+8.46%
1975	19,357	+6.32%
1980	21,728	+2.34%
1990	20,839	−0.42%
1995	23,243	+2.07%
2000	24,411	+1.06%
2007	28,101	+1.96%
2010	31,982	+4.82%
2015	34,620	+1.52%
2020	36,049	+0.85%
2024	37,883	+1.20%
Source: Philippine Statistics Authority

=== Religion ===
Based on the religion they followed, the Sibuco residents are divided between two religions whose proportions are almost equal, namely Islam and Roman Catholicism. Most of the followers of Islam are mainly the native people of the Zamboanga Peninsula region known as Kolibugan (20%), as well as Tausug and Sama migrants (25%), while Christianity is practiced by the native Subanon highland population (30%), and settlers of Visayan and Luzon origin (25%).

There is an Islamic religious community organization in Sibuco, the Sibuco Religious Muslims Association (SRMA) which handles all matters related to Islam there.

Jailani Mosque is one of the mosques where Muslims worship there, it was built on April 9, 2021. Apart from that, also available is Litawan Foursquare Gospel Church and Timolan Foursquare Gospel Church.

== Economy ==
Poverty incidence of Sibuco (%)

Source: Philippine Statistics Authority
