= Zamboanga del Norte's 3rd congressional district =

Legislative district of the Philippines

- Constituency for the House of Representatives of the Philippines
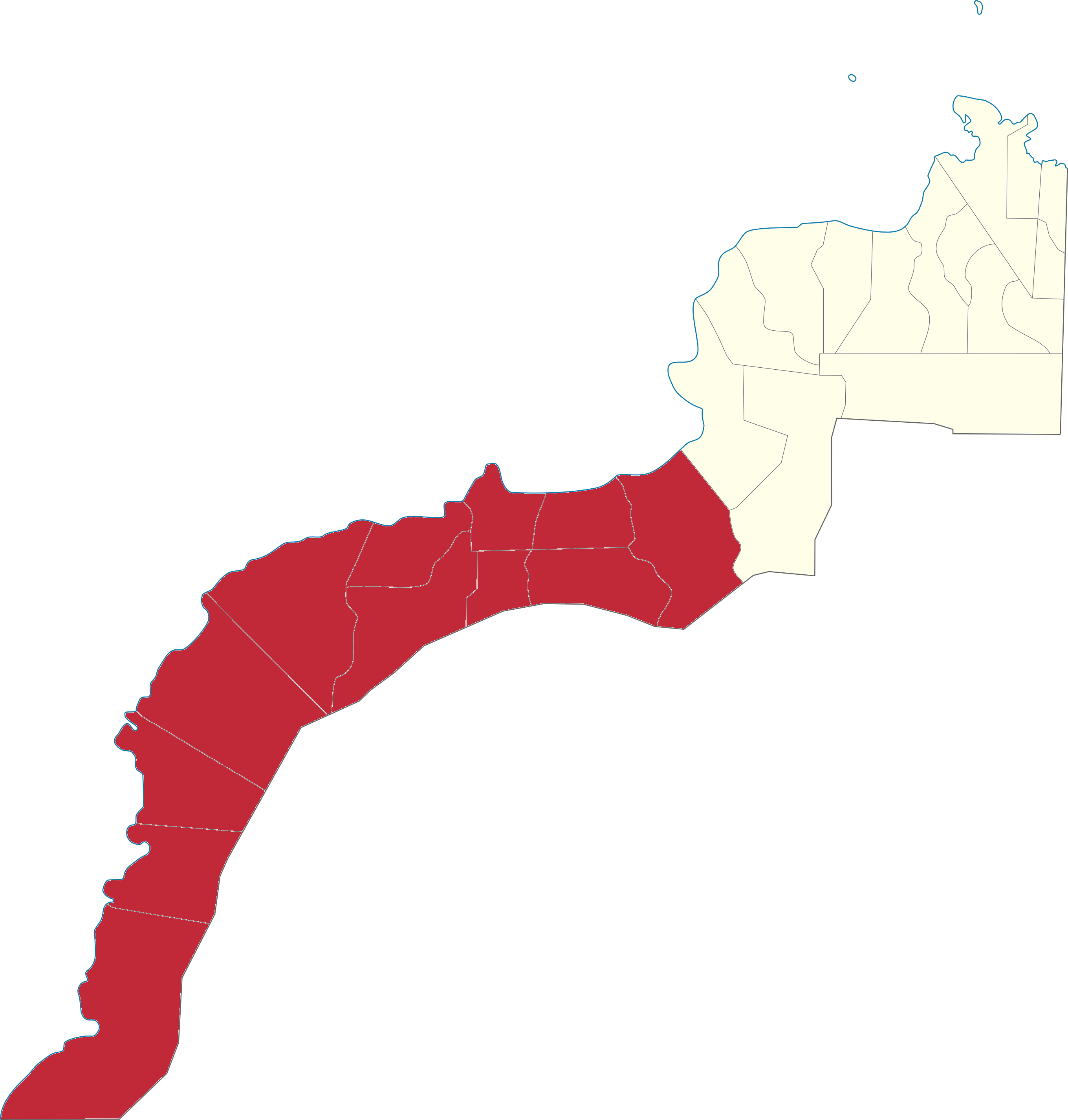
- Boundary of Zamboanga del Norte's 3rd congressional district in Zamboanga del Norte

- Location of Zamboanga del Norte within the Philippines
- Province: Zamboanga del Norte
- Region: Zamboanga Peninsula
- Population: 387,519 (2020)
- Electorate: 267,007 (2022)
- Major settlements: 12 LGUs: Municipalities; Baliguian; Godod; Gutalac; Kalawit; Labason; Leon B. Postigo; Liloy; Salug; Sibuco; Siocon; Sirawai; Tampilisan
- Area: 3,746.11 km^{2} (1,446.38 sq mi)

Current constituency
- Created: 1987
- Representative: Ian Amatong
- Political party: Liberal
- Congressional bloc: Majority

Zamboanga del Norte's 3rd congressional district is one of the three congressional districts of the Philippines in the province of Zamboanga del Norte. It has been represented in the House of Representatives since 1987. The district encompasses the southern half of the province consisting of the municipalities of Baliguian, Godod, Gutalac, Kalawit, Labason, Leon B. Postigo, Liloy, Salug, Sibuco, Siocon, Sirawai and Tampilisan. It is currently represented in the 20th Congress by Ian Amatong of the Liberal Party (LP).

== Representation history ==
#	Member		Term of office		Congress	Party	Electoral history	Constituent LGUs
#	Image	Name (Birth-Death)	Start	End	Congress	Party	Electoral history	Constituent LGUs
=== Zamboanga del Norte's 3rd district for the House of Representatives of the Philippines ===
District created February 2, 1987 from Zamboanga del Norte's at-large district.
1		Angel M. Carloto (1935-2022)	June 30, 1987	June 30, 1998	8th	UNIDO	Elected in 1987.	1987–1992; Baliguian, Godod, Gutalac, Labason, Leon B. Postigo, Liloy, Salug, Sibuco, Siocon, Sirawai, Tampilisan
1		Angel M. Carloto (1935-2022)	June 30, 1987	June 30, 1998	9th	LDP	Re-elected in 1992.	1992–present Baliguian, Godod, Gutalac, Kalawit, Labason, Leon B. Postigo, Liloy, Salug, Sibuco, Siocon, Sirawai, Tampilisan
1		Angel M. Carloto (1935-2022)	June 30, 1987	June 30, 1998	10th	Lakas	Re-elected in 1995.	1992–present Baliguian, Godod, Gutalac, Kalawit, Labason, Leon B. Postigo, Liloy, Salug, Sibuco, Siocon, Sirawai, Tampilisan
2		Angeles R. Carloto II	June 30, 1998	June 30, 2001	11th	Lakas	Elected in 1998.	1992–present Baliguian, Godod, Gutalac, Kalawit, Labason, Leon B. Postigo, Liloy, Salug, Sibuco, Siocon, Sirawai, Tampilisan
(1)		Angel M. Carloto (1935-2022)	June 30, 2001	June 30, 2004	12th	NPC	Elected in 2001.	1992–present Baliguian, Godod, Gutalac, Kalawit, Labason, Leon B. Postigo, Liloy, Salug, Sibuco, Siocon, Sirawai, Tampilisan
3		Cesar G. Jalosjos (born 1951)	June 30, 2004	June 30, 2013	13th	PDSP	Elected in 2004.	1992–present Baliguian, Godod, Gutalac, Kalawit, Labason, Leon B. Postigo, Liloy, Salug, Sibuco, Siocon, Sirawai, Tampilisan
3		Cesar G. Jalosjos (born 1951)	June 30, 2004	June 30, 2013	14th	Lakas	Re-elected in 2007.	1992–present Baliguian, Godod, Gutalac, Kalawit, Labason, Leon B. Postigo, Liloy, Salug, Sibuco, Siocon, Sirawai, Tampilisan
3		Cesar G. Jalosjos (born 1951)	June 30, 2004	June 30, 2013	15th	Lakas	Re-elected in 2010.	1992–present Baliguian, Godod, Gutalac, Kalawit, Labason, Leon B. Postigo, Liloy, Salug, Sibuco, Siocon, Sirawai, Tampilisan
4		Isagani S. Amatong (born 1940)	June 30, 2013	June 30, 2022	16th	Liberal	Elected in 2013.	1992–present Baliguian, Godod, Gutalac, Kalawit, Labason, Leon B. Postigo, Liloy, Salug, Sibuco, Siocon, Sirawai, Tampilisan
4		Isagani S. Amatong (born 1940)	June 30, 2013	June 30, 2022	17th	Liberal	Re-elected in 2016.	1992–present Baliguian, Godod, Gutalac, Kalawit, Labason, Leon B. Postigo, Liloy, Salug, Sibuco, Siocon, Sirawai, Tampilisan
4		Isagani S. Amatong (born 1940)	June 30, 2013	June 30, 2022	18th	Liberal	Re-elected in 2019.	1992–present Baliguian, Godod, Gutalac, Kalawit, Labason, Leon B. Postigo, Liloy, Salug, Sibuco, Siocon, Sirawai, Tampilisan
5		Adrian Michael A. Amatong (born 1978)	June 30, 2022	Incumbent	19th	Liberal	Elected in 2022.	1992–present Baliguian, Godod, Gutalac, Kalawit, Labason, Leon B. Postigo, Liloy, Salug, Sibuco, Siocon, Sirawai, Tampilisan
5		Adrian Michael A. Amatong (born 1978)	June 30, 2022	Incumbent	20th	Liberal	Re-elected in 2025.	1992–present Baliguian, Godod, Gutalac, Kalawit, Labason, Leon B. Postigo, Liloy, Salug, Sibuco, Siocon, Sirawai, Tampilisan

== House of Representative Election results ==
=== 2025 ===
2025 Philippine House of Representatives elections
Party	Candidate	Votes	%
Liberal	Adrian Michael "Ian" Amatong	120,099	63.61
Nacionalista	Cesar Jalosjos	68,721	36.39
Margin of victory		51,378	
Total votes		188,820	100
Liberal gain from Nacionalista			

=== 2022 ===
2022 Philippine House of Representatives elections
Party	Candidate	Votes	%
Liberal	Adrian Michael "Ian" Amatong	89,618	49.81
Nacionalista	Cesar Jalosjos	69,414	38.58
PROMDI	Joventino "Ben" Diamante	19,691	10.94
Independent	Moises Aballe Jr.	1,194	0.66
Margin of victory		20,204	
Invalid or blank votes		2,709	
Total votes		179,917	100
Liberal hold			

=== 2019 ===
2016 Philippine House of Representatives elections
Party	Candidate	Votes	%
Liberal	Isagani Amatong	91,319	57.16
Nacionalista	Bong Edding	68,418	42.83
Margin of victory		22,901	
Total votes		159,737	100
Liberal gain from Nacionalista			

=== 2016 ===
2016 Philippine House of Representatives elections
Party	Candidate	Votes	%
Liberal	Isagani Amatong	87,727	65.15
Nacionalista	Cesar Jalosjos	42,542	32.59
Independent	Ednu-Sajar Hambali	2,656	1.97
Independent	Joshua Baroro	1,068	0.79
Independent	Popoy Tumagidgid	657	0.48
Margin of victory		45,185	
Total votes		134,650	100
Liberal hold			

== See also ==
- Legislative districts of Zamboanga del Norte
