= Leon B. Postigo =

Municipality in Zamboanga del Norte, Philippines

Leon B. Postigo Bacungan
- Municipality
- Municipality of Leon B. Postigo
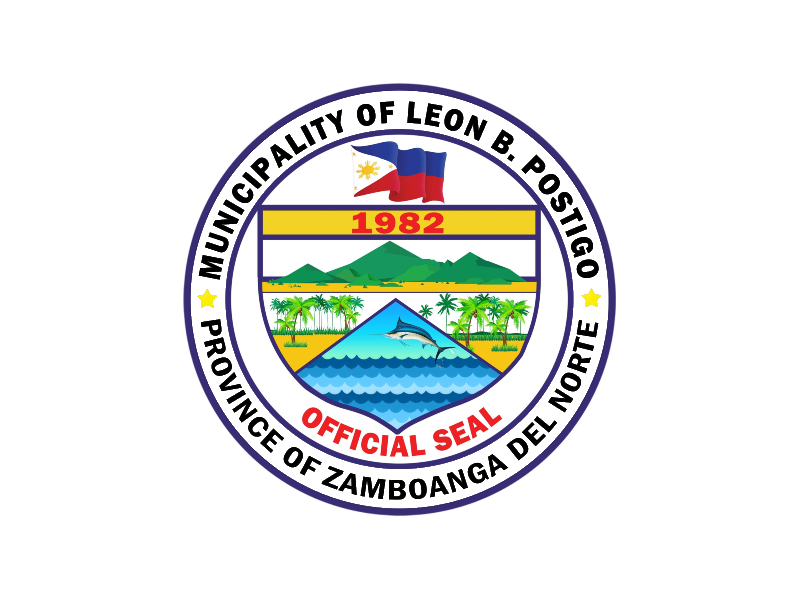
- Flag Seal
- Nickname: LBP
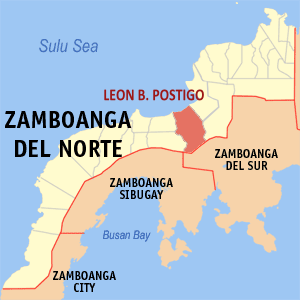
- Map of Zamboanga del Norte with Leon B. Postigo highlighted
- Interactive map of Leon B. Postigo
- Location within the Philippines
- Coordinates: 8°09′05″N 122°55′28″E
- Country: Philippines
- Region: Zamboanga Peninsula
- Province: Zamboanga del Norte
- District: 3rd district
- Founded: March 25, 1982
- Renamed: December 30, 1989
- Named for: Leon Bayot Postigo
- Barangays: 18 (see Barangays)

Government
  - Type: Sangguniang Bayan
  - Mayor: Runie O. Jamora (PFP)
  - Vice Mayor: Jocelyn L. Culanculan (PFP)
  - Representative: Adrian Michael A. Amatong (Liberal)
  - Municipal Council: Members: Meleo R. Cabilin; Tarciana L. Bagasina; Jay Z. Salcedo; Justino N. Murcia Jr.; Erllan Dave H. Cordova; Pablita A. Aliman; Aidaroz A. Hambali; Julieta P. Anadeo
  - Electorate: 20,210 voters (2025)

Area
  - Total: 255.50 km^{2} (98.65 sq mi)
- Elevation: 77 m (253 ft)
- Highest elevation: 428 m (1,404 ft)
- Lowest elevation: 0 m (0 ft)

Population (2024 census)
  - Total: 29,535
  - Density: 115.60/km^{2} (299.39/sq mi)
  - Households: 6,308

Economy
  - Income class: 2nd municipal income class
  - Poverty incidence: 51.59% (2023)
  - Revenue: ₱ 189.9 million (2024)
  - Assets: ₱ 354.3 million (2024)
  - Expenditure: ₱ 12.35 million (2024)
  - Liabilities: ₱ 117.4 million (2024)

Service provider
  - Electricity: Zamboanga del Norte Electric Cooperative (ZANECO)
  - Telecommunications: Smart, Globe, DITO, PLDT
  - Water: Bacungan Rural Water Works Sanitation Association (BARWWSA)
- Time zone: UTC+8 (PST)
- ZIP code: 7112
- PSGC: 0907226000
- IDD : area code: +63 (0)65
- Native languages: Subanon; Cebuano; Chavacano; Tagalog
- Major religions: Catholic, Islam, others
- Catholic diocese: Diocese of Dipolog
- Patron saint: Vincent Ferrer

Leon B. Postigo, officially the Municipality of Leon B. Postigo (Cebuano: Lungsod sa Leon B. Postigo; Subanen: Benwa Leon B. Postigo; Chavacano: Municipalidad de Leon B. Postigo; Tagalog: Bayan ng Leon B. Postigo), is a municipality in the province of Zamboanga del Norte, Philippines. According to the 2024 census, it has a population of 29,535 people.

== History ==
In the early 1980s, the councils of six barangays, along with residents of Maras, in the then southern Sindangan demanded for a new municipality, which was originally proposed to be called Talinga, with the barangay with the same name, located 11 kilometers from Poblacion, to be the seat of government. The proposed municipality was to intervene the distance of Sindangan and Salug from each other, which were about 40 kilometers.

Then assemblyman Guardson R. Lood sponsored Parliamentary Bill No. 300, which was also co-authored by eight other assemblymen. The bill was approved as Batas Pambansa Blg. 204 on March 25, 1982; 17 barangays in southwestern part of the mother municipality, but excluding Maras, were separated to create the municipality, originally named Bacungan, with another barangay with the same name, which was not included in the original plan, to be the seat of government. A plebiscite for ratification, along with ten more newly-created local entities including nearby Godod, was held on May 17, coinciding with the barangay elections.

It was renamed to its current name by virtue of Republic Act No. 6830 on December 30, 1989, in honor of Leon Bayot Postigo, a Philippine Constabulary corporal whose 10-hectare lot in the town was donated by his heirs to the local government.

== Geography ==
=== Barangays ===
Leon B. Postigo is politically subdivided into 18 barangays. Each barangay consists of puroks while some have sitios.

- Bacungan (Poblacion)
- Bogabongan
- Delusom
- Mangop
- Manil
- Mawal
- Midatag
- Morob
- Nasibac
- Palandok
- Santa Maria
- Sipacong
- Talinga
- Tinaplan
- Tiniguiban
- Tinuyop
- Tiogan
- Titik

=== Climate ===
Climate data for Leon B. Postigo, Zamboanga del Norte
Month	Jan	Feb	Mar	Apr	May	Jun	Jul	Aug	Sep	Oct	Nov	Dec	Year
Mean daily maximum °C (°F)	29 (84)	30 (86)	30 (86)	31 (88)	30 (86)	29 (84)	29 (84)	29 (84)	29 (84)	29 (84)	29 (84)	29 (84)	29 (85)
Mean daily minimum °C (°F)	23 (73)	23 (73)	23 (73)	24 (75)	25 (77)	25 (77)	24 (75)	24 (75)	25 (77)	25 (77)	24 (75)	23 (73)	24 (75)
Average precipitation mm (inches)	96 (3.8)	79 (3.1)	117 (4.6)	127 (5.0)	239 (9.4)	301 (11.9)	286 (11.3)	283 (11.1)	255 (10.0)	272 (10.7)	188 (7.4)	115 (4.5)	2,358 (92.8)
Average rainy days	17.3	16.0	19.7	21.6	29.0	29.0	29.7	29.1	28.5	28.9	25.3	20.0	294.1
Source: Meteoblue

== Demographics ==
Population census of Leon B. Postigo
Year	Pop.	±% p.a.
1990	14,618	—
1995	20,728	+6.76%
2000	19,550	−1.25%
2007	21,195	+1.12%
2010	24,643	+5.64%
2015	26,221	+1.19%
2020	27,639	+1.11%
2024	29,535	+1.61%
Source: Philippine Statistics Authority

Population by Barangay
Barangay	Population
Bacungan (Poblacion)	4,946
Bogabongan	2,000
Delusom	1,628
Mangop	929
Manil	2,020
Mawal	759
Midatag	794
Nasibac	1,802
Rizon	2,645
Sipacong	1,287
Santa Maria	1,456
Talinga	2,482
Tinaplan	624
Tiniguiban	1,378
Tinuyop	1,235
Tiogan	1,077
Titik	1,538
Morob	935
Total	29,535
Source: Philippine Statistics Authority

== Economy ==
Poverty incidence of Leon B. Postigo (%)

Source: Philippine Statistics Authority

== See also ==
- List of renamed cities and municipalities in the Philippines
