= Salug =

Municipality in Zamboanga del Norte, Philippines

- Municipality
- Municipality of Salug
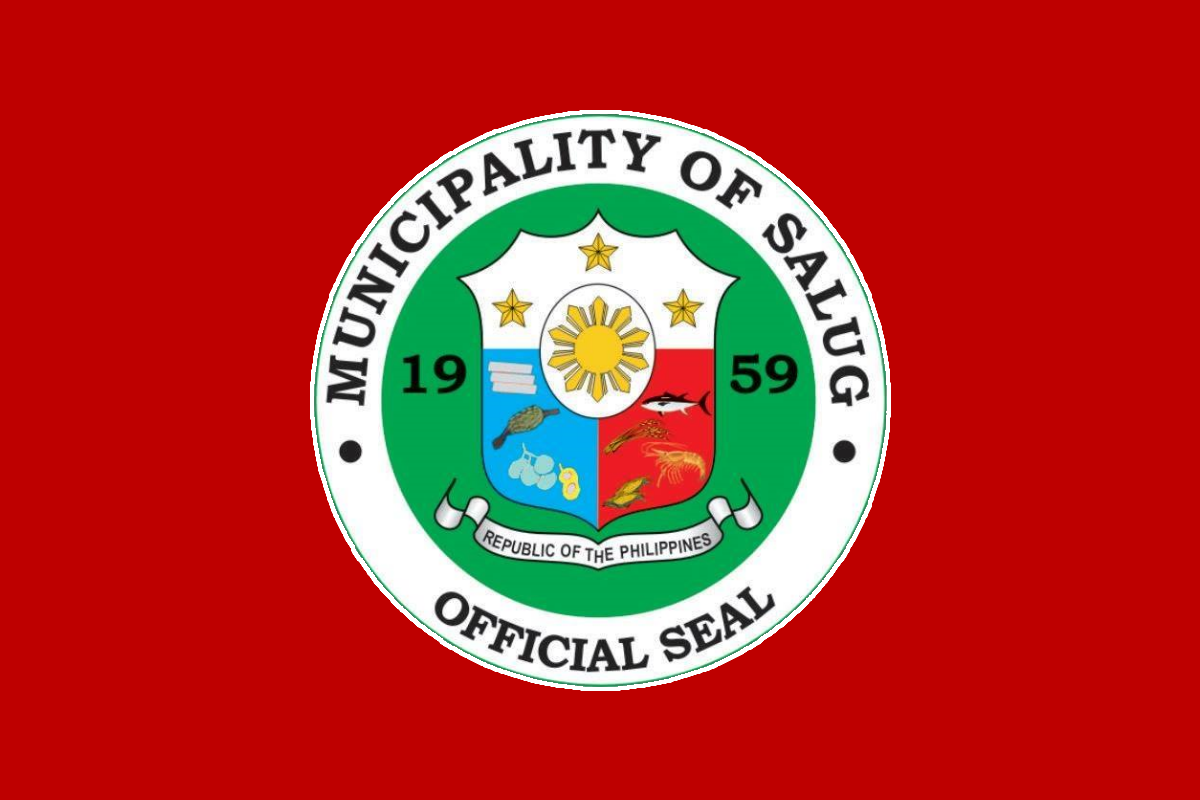
- Flag Seal

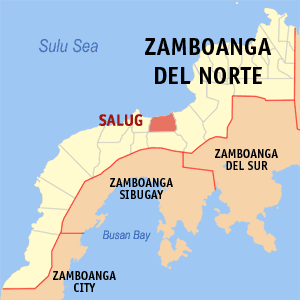
- Map of Zamboanga del Norte with Salug highlighted
- Interactive map of Salug
- Location within the Philippines
- Coordinates: 8°06′27″N 122°45′27″E
- Country: Philippines
- Region: Zamboanga Peninsula
- Province: Zamboanga del Norte
- District: 3rd district
- Barangays: 23 (see Barangays)

Government
  - Type: Sangguniang Bayan
  - Mayor: Ruth M. Brillantes (Lakas)
  - Vice Mayor: Michael I. Buzon (Lakas)
  - Representative: Adrian Michael A. Amatong (Liberal)
  - Municipal Council: Members: Imelda P. Janang; Edgar A. Sultan; Neal Brent S. Acas; Marichu Michel R. Acas-Yap; John Kenneth A. Pamil; Myrna A. Maraon; Jose Reil P. Lagare; Orlan J. Tolin
  - Electorate: 23,433 voters (2025)

Area
  - Total: 206.60 km^{2} (79.77 sq mi)
- Elevation: 50 m (160 ft)
- Highest elevation: 282 m (925 ft)
- Lowest elevation: 0 m (0 ft)

Population (2024 census)
  - Total: 33,060
  - Density: 160.0/km^{2} (414.4/sq mi)
  - Households: 7,558

Economy
  - Income class: 2nd municipal income class
  - Poverty incidence: 47.75% (2023)
  - Revenue: ₱ 187.6 million (2024)
  - Assets: ₱ 379.5 million (2024)
  - Expenditure: ₱ 187.6 million (2024)
  - Liabilities: ₱ 25.46 million (2024)

Service provider
  - Electricity: Zamboanga del Norte Electric Cooperative (ZANECO)
- Time zone: UTC+8 (PST)
- ZIP code: 7114
- PSGC: 0907213000
- IDD : area code: +63 (0)65
- Native languages: Subanon; Cebuano; Chavacano; Tagalog
- Website: salug.zamboangadelnorte.com

Salug, officially the Municipality of Salug (Cebuano: Lungsod sa Salug; Subanen: Benwa Salog; Chavacano: Municipalidad de Salug; Tagalog: Bayan ng Salug), is a municipality in the province of Zamboanga del Norte, Philippines. As of the 2024 census, it had a population of 33,060 people.

== History ==
The municipality of Salug was established by virtue of Republic Act No. 2510 enacted on June 21, 1959, upon separation of eleven barrios of Liloy, with Barrio Mucas the seat of government.

Araw ng Salug (Salug Day) is annually celebrated on the 18th day of September.

Salug reduced its territory upon the creation of the municipality of Godod by virtue of Batas Pambansa Blg. 146 issued on February 8, 1982.

=== Mayors' protest ===
On December 28, 2007, Salug Mayor Jesus Lim, president of the Zamboanga del Norte Mayors’ League, led 20 mayors of Zamboanga del Norte who protested the Department of Justice's incarceration of former congressman Romeo Jalosjos. Flags in their respective towns were flown at half mast and black ribbons were displayed at town halls.

== Geography ==
Municipality of Salug is bounded on the south by the municipality of Godod the north-west by Liloy, to the east by the municipality of Leon B. Postigo, and to the north by Sindangan Bay.

=== Climate ===
Climate data for Salug, Zamboanga del Norte
| Month | Jan | Feb | Mar | Apr | May | Jun | Jul | Aug | Sep | Oct | Nov | Dec | Year |
|---|---|---|---|---|---|---|---|---|---|---|---|---|---|
| Mean daily maximum °C (°F) | 29 (84) | 30 (86) | 30 (86) | 31 (88) | 30 (86) | 29 (84) | 29 (84) | 29 (84) | 29 (84) | 29 (84) | 29 (84) | 29 (84) | 29 (85) |
| Mean daily minimum °C (°F) | 23 (73) | 23 (73) | 23 (73) | 24 (75) | 25 (77) | 25 (77) | 24 (75) | 24 (75) | 25 (77) | 25 (77) | 24 (75) | 23 (73) | 24 (75) |
| Average precipitation mm (inches) | 96 (3.8) | 79 (3.1) | 117 (4.6) | 127 (5.0) | 239 (9.4) | 301 (11.9) | 286 (11.3) | 283 (11.1) | 255 (10.0) | 272 (10.7) | 188 (7.4) | 115 (4.5) | 2,358 (92.8) |
| Average rainy days | 17.3 | 16.0 | 19.7 | 21.6 | 29.0 | 29.0 | 29.7 | 29.1 | 28.5 | 28.9 | 25.3 | 20.0 | 294.1 |
Source: Meteoblue

Salug falls within the third type of climate wherein the seasons are not very pronounced. Rain is more or less evenly distributed throughout the year. Because of its tropical location the municipality does not experience cold weather. Neither does it experience strong weather disturbances due to its geographical location (being outside the typhoon belt) and also because of the mountains that are surrounding the municipality.

=== Barangays ===
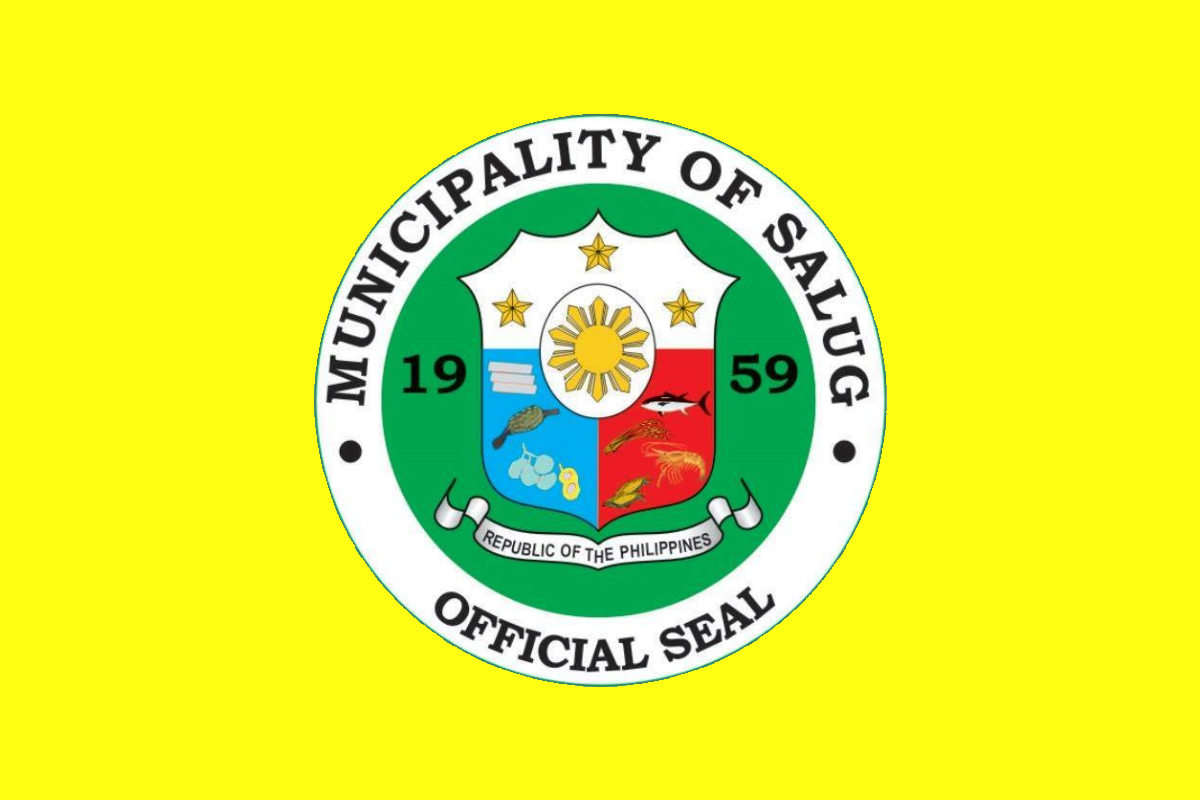
Former flag of Salug

Salug is politically subdivided into 23 barangays. Each barangay consists of puroks while some have sitios.

- Bacong
- Balakan
- Binoni
- Calucap
- Canawan
- Caracol
- Danao
- Dinoan
- Dipolod
- Fatima (Pogan)
- Ipilan
- Lanawan
- Liguac
- Lipakan
- Mucas
- Pacuhan
- Poblacion (Salug)
- Poblacion East
- Pukay
- Ramon Magsaysay (Tugop)
- Santo Niño
- Tambalang
- Tapalan

== Demographics ==
Population census of Salug
| Year | Pop. | ±% p.a. |
|---|---|---|
| 1960 | 13,486 | — |
| 1970 | 28,688 | +7.83% |
| 1975 | 32,709 | +2.67% |
| 1980 | 39,088 | +3.63% |
| 1990 | 25,702 | −4.11% |
| 1995 | 28,411 | +1.90% |
| 2000 | 28,914 | +0.38% |
| 2007 | 29,960 | +0.49% |
| 2010 | 31,157 | +1.44% |
| 2015 | 32,204 | +0.63% |
| 2020 | 32,134 | −0.05% |
| 2024 | 33,060 | +0.68% |
Source: Philippine Statistics Authority

Salug Municipality is predominantly Christian with Philippine Independent Church or Aglipayan and Roman Catholics constitutes the majority of the Christians. Salugnon is composed of Visayan speaking locals and the minorities that compose of the lumad or aborigine Subanon tribe.

=== Language ===
Cebuano and Subanon are majority spoken languages. The majority of the population can speak and understand English.

== Tourism ==
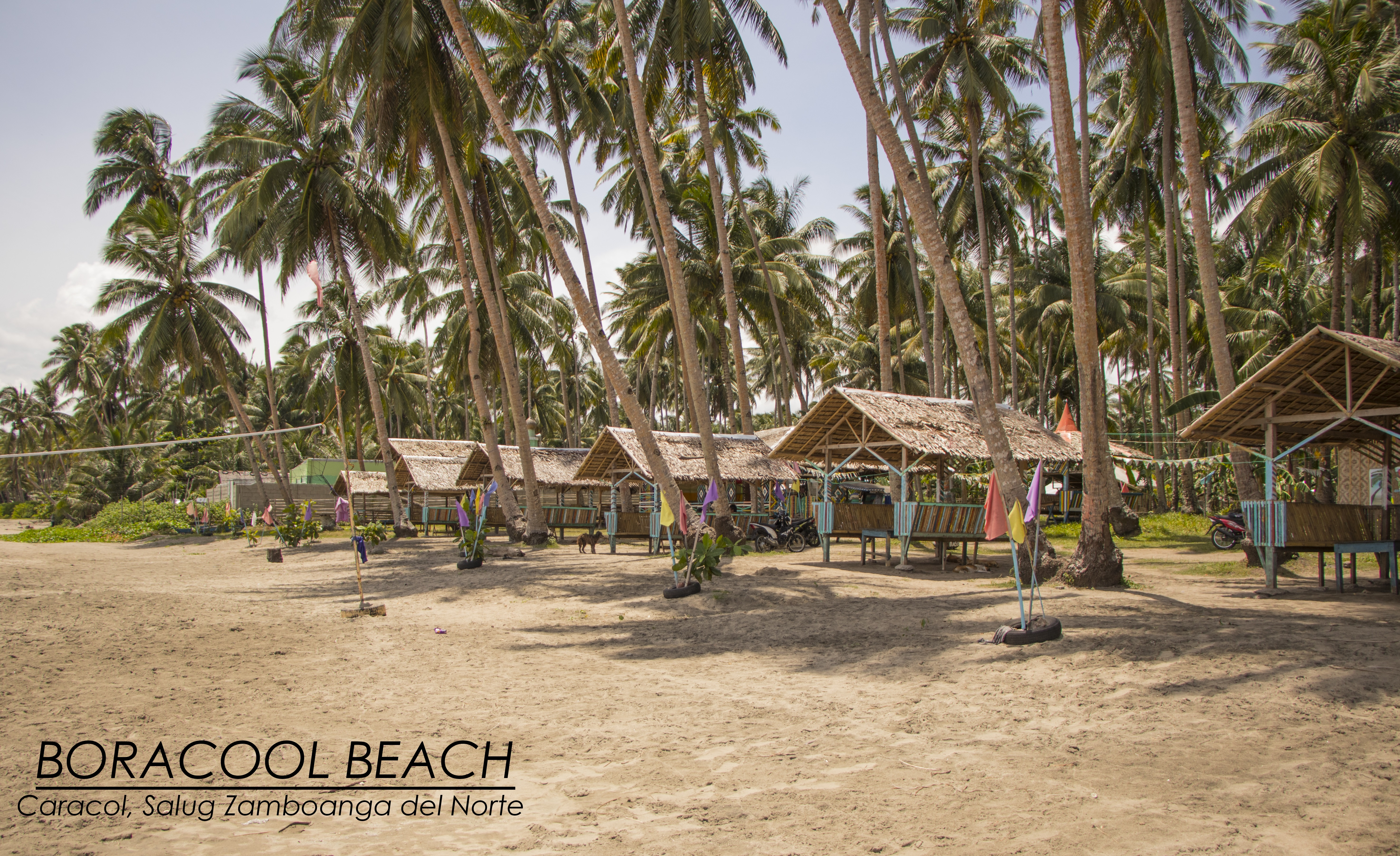
Boracool Beach

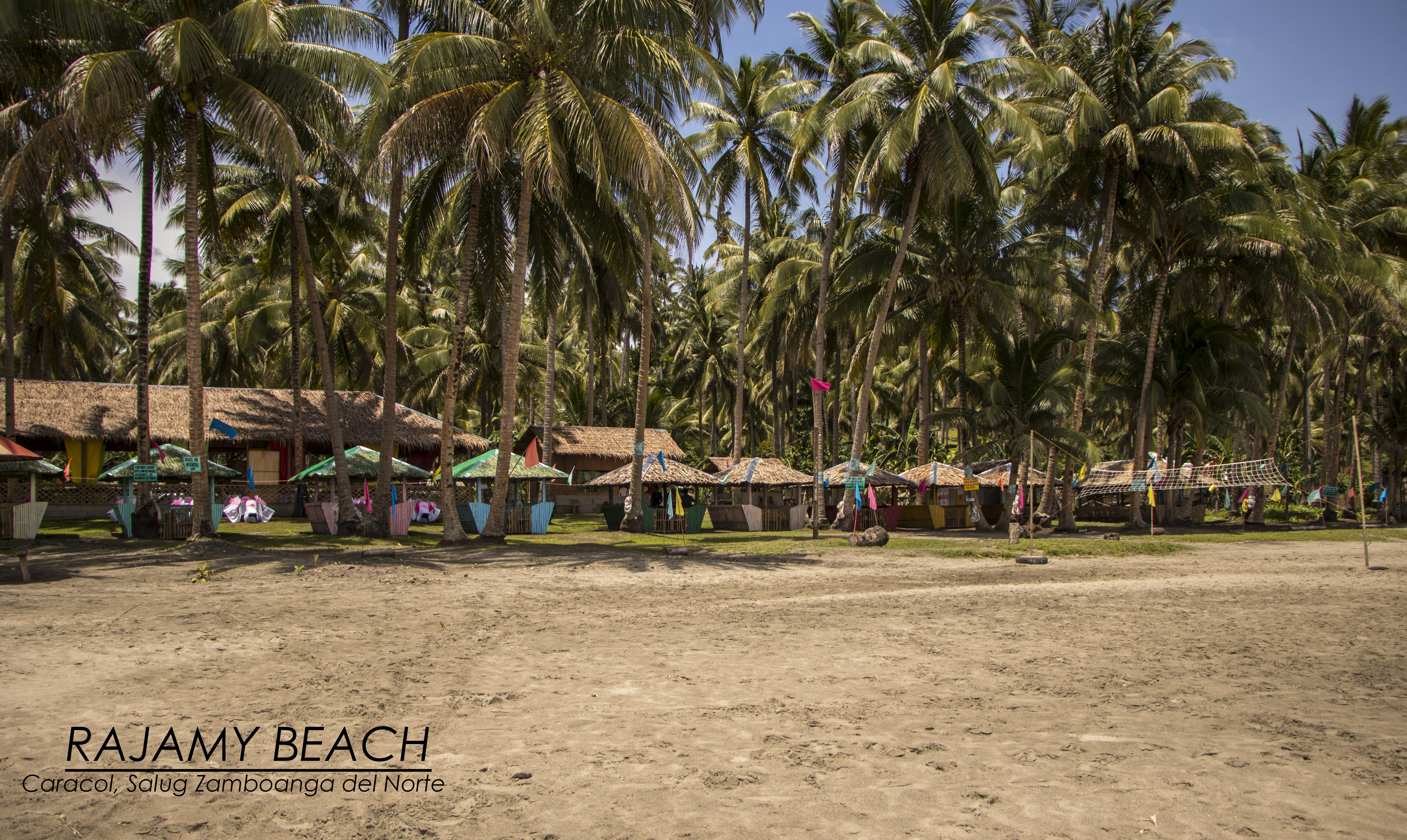
Rajamy Beach

== Economy ==
Poverty incidence of Salug (%)

Source: Philippine Statistics Authority

== Transportation ==
The Integrated Bus Terminal, located at the center of the municipality, serves short- and long-distance trips connecting other municipalities, cities in Zamboanga del Norte and neighboring provinces. The public modes of transportation within the municipality are sikad-sikad and habal-habal and pedicabs. Jeepneys, van, and bus Rural Transits are available for long-distance travels.

=== Seaport ===
The Port of Liloy is located 30 minutes away from the Municipality of Salug facing the Sindangan Bay It serves the cargo port for transporting products to and from Zamboanga City, Sindangan and Cebu.

=== Airports ===
The main airport is Dipolog Airport, located in the City of Dipolog, a 3 1/2-hour drive from the Poblacion. There is also a neighboring community airport in Liloy but it serves only private and government aircraft for official visits in the adjacent areas.

== Government ==
=== Elected officials ===
Members of the municipal council (2019–2022):

| Position | Name | Party |
|---|---|---|
| Municipal Mayor | Melodie J. Tolin | PDP–Laban |
| Vice Mayor | William D. Maribojoc | APP |
| Sangguniang Bayan; Members | Jose Reil P. Lagare | APP |
| Sangguniang Bayan; Members | Jonathan R. Balucos | APP |
| Sangguniang Bayan; Members | Richard P. Tomarong | APP |
| Sangguniang Bayan; Members | Allan D. Saldia | APP |
| Sangguniang Bayan; Members | Gerardo T. Literatus | APP |
| Sangguniang Bayan; Members | Emedio J. Galleposo | APP |
| Sangguniang Bayan; Members | Mercedario N. Pamil | PDP–Laban |
| Sangguniang Bayan; Members | Salatiel S. Dialo | APP |

Municipal officials (2016-2019):

- Mayor: Jeffrey T. Lim
- Vice Mayor: William D. Maribojoc
- Councilors:
  - Jonathan R. Balucos
  - Rebecca L. Baguio
  - Mercedario N. Pamil
  - Gerardo T. Literatus
  - Allan D. Saldia
  - Salatiel S. Dialo
  - Oscar M. Acas
  - Edgar A. Sultan
  - Cerelino Mercado - ABC President
