= Murcielagos Island =

Island off Mindanao, Philippines

Native name: Pulo sa Baliudyong
- Location within Mindanao mainland Location within Philippines

Geography
- Location: 4.8 kilometers (3.0 mi) off Zamboanga Peninsula
- Coordinates: 8°6′55″N 122°26′47″E
- Archipelago: Philippines
- Adjacent to: Sulu Sea

Administration
- Philippines
- Region: Zamboanga Peninsula
- Province: Zamboanga del Norte
- Municipality: Labason

Additional information

Murcielagos Island locally known as Pulo Baliudyong is a small low-lying island in the Sulu Sea off the coast of Zamboanga del Norte in the southern Philippine island of Mindanao. It measures over 500 metres (1,600 ft) across at its widest point and is situated on an oval reef about 1.6 kilometres (0.99 mi) in length. situated in 4.8 kilometres (3.0 mi) north of Quipit Point on the west side of Patauag Bay in the Zamboanga municipality of Labason. It is known for its white coral-sand beaches and rich marine resources. To its west lies an islet called Bayangan Island. The two islands are collectively known as Murcielagos Islands and are administratively part of the Labason poblacion of Antonino.

== Protected area ==
The island is a nesting ground for marine turtles and several migratory seabirds. The surrounding reefs support a rich marine fauna, including giant clams. It was declared a protected area in April 2000 known as the Murcielagos Island Protected Landscape and Seascape. It covers the 100-hectare (250-acre) Murcielagos Island with a buffer zone covering 151 hectares (370 acres) of surrounding municipal waters including Bayangan Island.

== See also ==
- List of islands of the Philippines
