= Tampilisan =

Municipality in Zamboanga del Norte, Philippines

- Municipality
- Municipality of Tampilisan
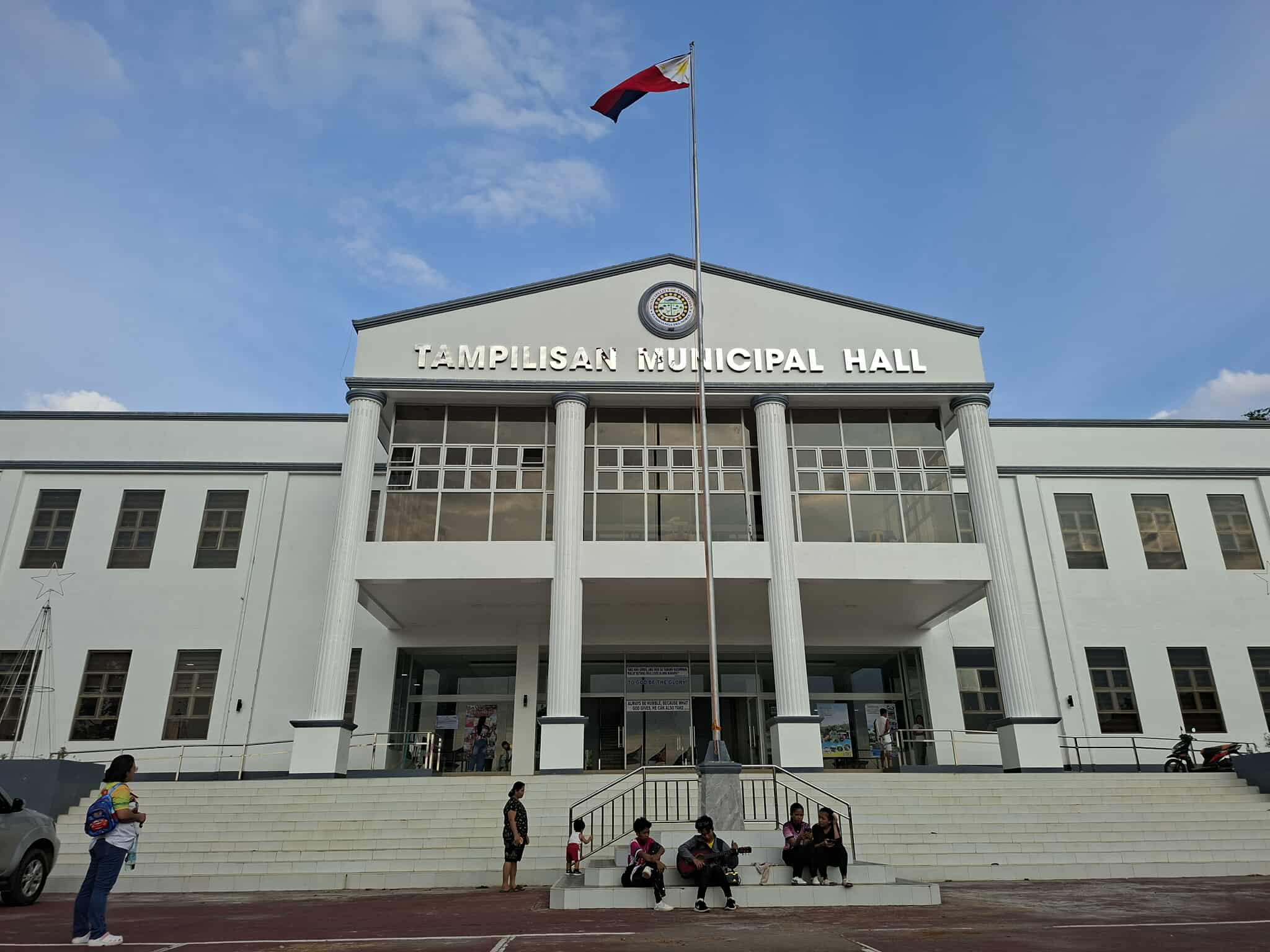
- Town Hall in 2025

- Seal

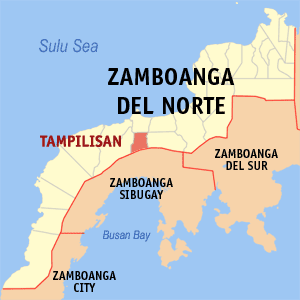
- Map of Zamboanga del Norte with Tampilisan highlighted
- Interactive map of Tampilisan
- Location within the Philippines
- Coordinates: 7°58′34″N 122°39′50″E
- Country: Philippines
- Region: Zamboanga Peninsula
- Province: Zamboanga del Norte
- District: 3rd district
- Founded: December 17, 1978
- Barangays: 20 (see Barangays)

Government
  - Type: Sangguniang Bayan
  - Mayor: Angeles R. Carloto, II (Lakas)
  - Vice Mayor: Norabeth T. Carloto (Lakas)
  - Representative: Adrian Michael A. Amatong (Liberal)
  - Municipal Council: Members: Dante G. Abong; Randolf Clark T. Barandino; Carmelita G. Soriño; Pacifico O. Cajocon, Sr.; Earl Justine D. Bulaqueña; Lito C. Petralba; Julius D. Bomediano; Jessie C. Mapula
  - Electorate: 17,509 voters (2025)

Area
  - Total: 137.75 km^{2} (53.19 sq mi)
- Elevation: 197 m (646 ft)
- Highest elevation: 610 m (2,000 ft)
- Lowest elevation: 73 m (240 ft)

Population (2024 census)
  - Total: 24,653
  - Density: 178.97/km^{2} (463.53/sq mi)
  - Households: 6,460

Economy
  - Income class: 3rd municipal income class
  - Poverty incidence: 43.02% (2023)
  - Revenue: ₱ 155.1 million (2024)
  - Assets: ₱ 472.7 million (2024)
  - Expenditure: ₱ 70.96 million (2024)
  - Liabilities: ₱ 140.2 million (2024)

Service provider
  - Electricity: Zamboanga del Norte Electric Cooperative (ZANECO)
- Time zone: UTC+8 (PST)
- ZIP code: 7116
- PSGC: 0907221000
- IDD : area code: +63 (0)65
- Native languages: Subanon; Cebuano; Chavacano; Tagalog
- Website: tampilisan.gov.ph

Tampilisan, officially the Municipality of Tampilisan (Cebuano: Lungsod sa Tampilisan; Subanen: Benwa Tampilisan; Chavacano: Municipalidad de Tampilisan; Tagalog: Bayan ng Tampilisan), is a municipality in the province of Zamboanga del Norte, Philippines. According to the 2024 census, it has a population of 24,653 people.

It is located in Zamboanga peninsula along the boundary with Zamboanga Sibugay, traversed by the national highway to Zamboanga City. The municipality is 152 kilometres (94 mi) from Dipolog, the capital of the province.

== History ==
The name Tampilisan originated from a tree called "Tampilis". This tree is about one to three meters in height, belongs to the palm family. Its sturdy part when split was used by the natives, Subanen, as a substitute for betel nuts. Since this tree were abundant in the area, the place thus called by the native as "Tampilisan".

The municipality was originally a barangay of the Municipality of Liloy, Zamboanga del Norte. In the early part of 1978, because of the concentration of population and potentials of the area and through consultation of the local leaders, Assemblyman Guardson Lood filed a bill in the Interim Batasang Pambansa for the creation of Tampilisan as an independent municipality.

The municipality of Tampilisan was established by virtue of Batas Pambansa Blg. 14 issued on December 22, 1978, upon separation of seven barangays in southern part of Liloy, with the barangay of the same name designated as the seat of government. A plebiscite was held on March 22, 1979.

The first appointed and elected mayor was Cesar A. Bomediano, a former SB Member of Liloy.

== Geography ==
=== Barangays ===
Tampilisan is politically subdivided into 20 barangays. Each barangay consists of puroks while some have sitios.

- Balacbaan
- Banbanan
- New Barili
- Cabong
- Camul
- Farmington
- Galingon
- Lawaan
- Lumbayao
- Malila-T.
- Molos
- New Dapitan
- Poblacion (Tampilisan)
- Sandayong
- Santo Niño
- Situbo
- Tilubog
- Tininggaan
- Tubod
- ZNAC

=== Climate ===
Climate data for Tampilisan, Zamboanga del Norte
Month	Jan	Feb	Mar	Apr	May	Jun	Jul	Aug	Sep	Oct	Nov	Dec	Year
Mean daily maximum °C (°F)	29 (84)	29 (84)	29 (84)	30 (86)	29 (84)	28 (82)	28 (82)	28 (82)	28 (82)	28 (82)	28 (82)	28 (82)	29 (83)
Mean daily minimum °C (°F)	22 (72)	22 (72)	22 (72)	23 (73)	24 (75)	24 (75)	23 (73)	23 (73)	24 (75)	24 (75)	23 (73)	22 (72)	23 (73)
Average precipitation mm (inches)	96 (3.8)	79 (3.1)	117 (4.6)	127 (5.0)	239 (9.4)	301 (11.9)	286 (11.3)	283 (11.1)	255 (10.0)	272 (10.7)	188 (7.4)	115 (4.5)	2,358 (92.8)
Average rainy days	17.3	16.0	19.7	21.6	29.0	29.0	29.7	29.1	28.5	28.9	25.3	20.0	294.1
Source: Meteoblue

== Demographics ==
Population census of Tampilisan
Year	Pop.	±% p.a.
1980	11,797	—
1990	14,665	+2.20%
1995	17,732	+3.62%
2000	19,536	+2.10%
2007	21,671	+1.44%
2010	23,056	+2.28%
2015	24,307	+1.01%
2020	24,680	+0.32%
2024	24,653	−0.03%
Source: Philippine Statistics Authority

== Economy ==
Poverty incidence of Tampilisan (%)

Source: Philippine Statistics Authority
