= Sirawai =

Municipality in Zamboanga del Norte, Philippines

- Municipality
- Municipality of Sirawai
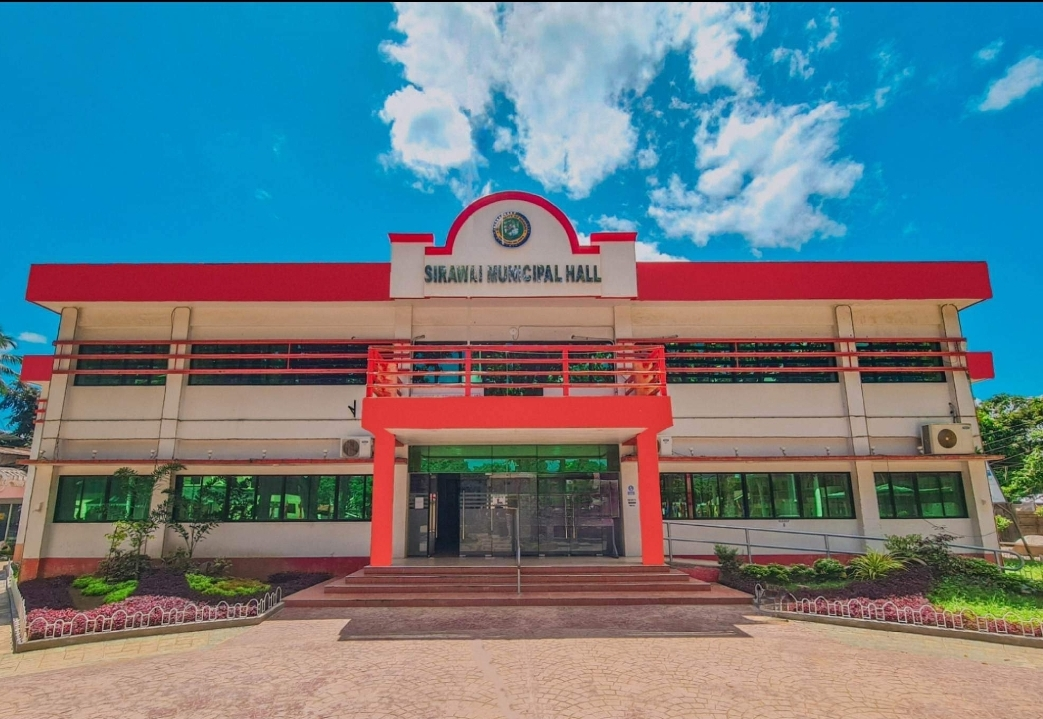
- Municipal Hall

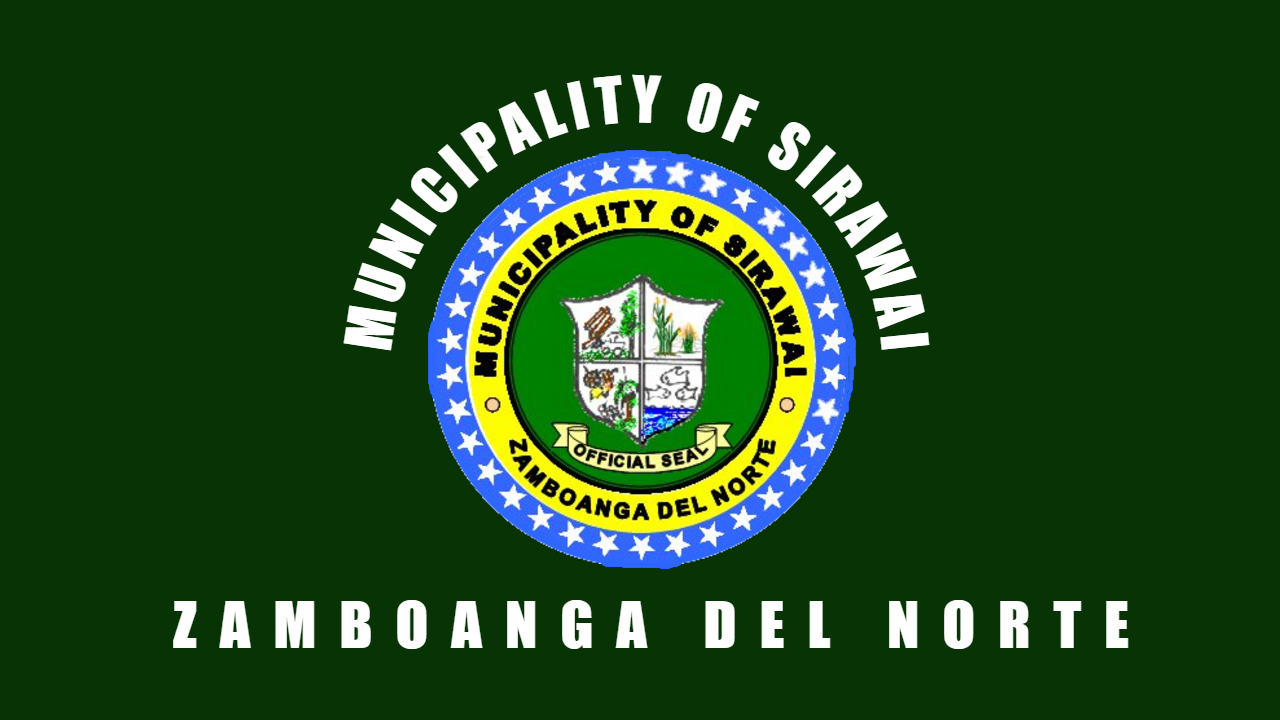
- Flag Seal

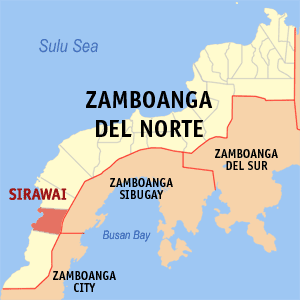
- Map of Zamboanga del Norte with Sirawai highlighted
- Interactive map of Sirawai
- Location within the Philippines
- Coordinates: 7°35′07″N 122°08′26″E
- Country: Philippines
- Region: Zamboanga Peninsula
- Province: Zamboanga del Norte
- District: 3rd district
- Barangays: 34 (see Barangays)

Government
  - Type: Sangguniang Bayan
  - Mayor: Aljazar P. Janihim (Independent)
  - Vice Mayor: Pulman M. Darquez (Independent)
  - Representative: Adrian Michael A. Amatong (Liberal)
  - Municipal Council: Members: Larry M. Bacundo; Jonjong P. Sala; Monzir W. Jamaa; Doctor C. Lakim; Sarah S. Ontong; Adjaluddin I. Wahid; Nolidia D. Inding; Kasiran S. Bairulla
  - Electorate: 18,809 voters (2025)

Area
  - Total: 222.50 km^{2} (85.91 sq mi)
- Elevation: 88 m (289 ft)
- Highest elevation: 536 m (1,759 ft)
- Lowest elevation: 0 m (0 ft)

Population (2024 census)
  - Total: 39,836
  - Density: 179.04/km^{2} (463.71/sq mi)
  - Households: 6,511

Economy
  - Income class: 2nd municipal income class
  - Poverty incidence: 57.45% (2023)
  - Revenue: ₱ 186.2 million (2024)
  - Assets: ₱ 380.7 million (2024)
  - Expenditure: ₱ 70.29 million (2024)
  - Liabilities: ₱ 129.5 million (2024)

Service provider
  - Electricity: Zamboanga del Sur 2 Electric Cooperative (ZAMSURECO 2)
- Time zone: UTC+8 (PST)
- ZIP code: 7121
- PSGC: 0907220000
- IDD : area code: +63 (0)65
- Native languages: Subanon; Chavacano; Tagalog
- Website: sirawai.zamboangadelnorte.com

Sirawai, officially the Municipality of Sirawai (Cebuano: Lungsod sa Sirawai; Subanen: Benwa Sirawai; Tausūg: Kawman sin Sirawai; Zamboangueño: Municipalidad de Sirawai; Tagalog: Bayan ng Sirawai), is a municipality in the province of Zamboanga del Norte, Philippines. According to the 2024 census, it has a population of 39,836 people.

== Geography ==
=== Barangays ===
Sirawai is politically subdivided into 34 barangays. Each barangay consists of puroks while some have sitios.

- Balatakan
- Balonkan
- Balubuan
- Bitugan
- Bongon
- Catuyan
- Culasian
- Danganon
- Doña Cecilia
- Guban
- Lagundi
- Libucon
- Lubok
- Macuyon
- Minanga
- Motong
- Napulan
- Panabutan
- Piacan
- Pisa Itom
- Pisa Puti
- Piña
- Pugos
- Pula Bato
- Pulang Lupa
- Saint Mary (Poblacion)
- San Nicolas (Poblacion)
- San Roque (Poblacion)
- San Vicente (Poblacion)
- Sipakit
- Sipawa
- Sirawai Proper (Poblacion)
- Talabiga
- Tapanayan

=== Climate ===
Climate data for Sirawai, Zamboanga del Norte
Month	Jan	Feb	Mar	Apr	May	Jun	Jul	Aug	Sep	Oct	Nov	Dec	Year
Mean daily maximum °C (°F)	30 (86)	30 (86)	31 (88)	31 (88)	30 (86)	29 (84)	29 (84)	29 (84)	29 (84)	29 (84)	30 (86)	30 (86)	30 (86)
Mean daily minimum °C (°F)	23 (73)	23 (73)	24 (75)	25 (77)	25 (77)	25 (77)	24 (75)	24 (75)	25 (77)	25 (77)	24 (75)	24 (75)	24 (76)
Average precipitation mm (inches)	98 (3.9)	78 (3.1)	116 (4.6)	115 (4.5)	222 (8.7)	281 (11.1)	272 (10.7)	282 (11.1)	237 (9.3)	258 (10.2)	180 (7.1)	108 (4.3)	2,247 (88.6)
Average rainy days	19.6	18.6	21.8	22.9	29.0	28.6	28.7	28.3	27.0	28.6	25.9	22.1	301.1
Source: Meteoblue

== Demographics ==
Population census of Sirawai
Year	Pop.	±% p.a.
1918	2,289	—
1970	9,050	+2.68%
1975	9,293	+0.53%
1980	10,662	+2.79%
1990	19,911	+6.45%
1995	22,093	+1.97%
2000	16,534	−6.02%
2007	20,112	+2.74%
2010	24,583	+7.58%
2015	28,799	+3.06%
2020	31,163	+1.67%
2024	39,836	+6.07%
Source: Philippine Statistics Authority

Sirawai as a rural municipality has ethnic diversity in its population, the majority of the population is Kolibugan, a Muslim Subanon subgroup, and migrant Christian Bisaya, as well as a small population of Tausug and Sinama who are all Muslim.

== Economy ==
Poverty incidence of Sirawai (%)

Source: Philippine Statistics Authority
