= Labason =

Municipality in Zamboanga del Norte, Philippines

- Municipality
- Municipality of Labason
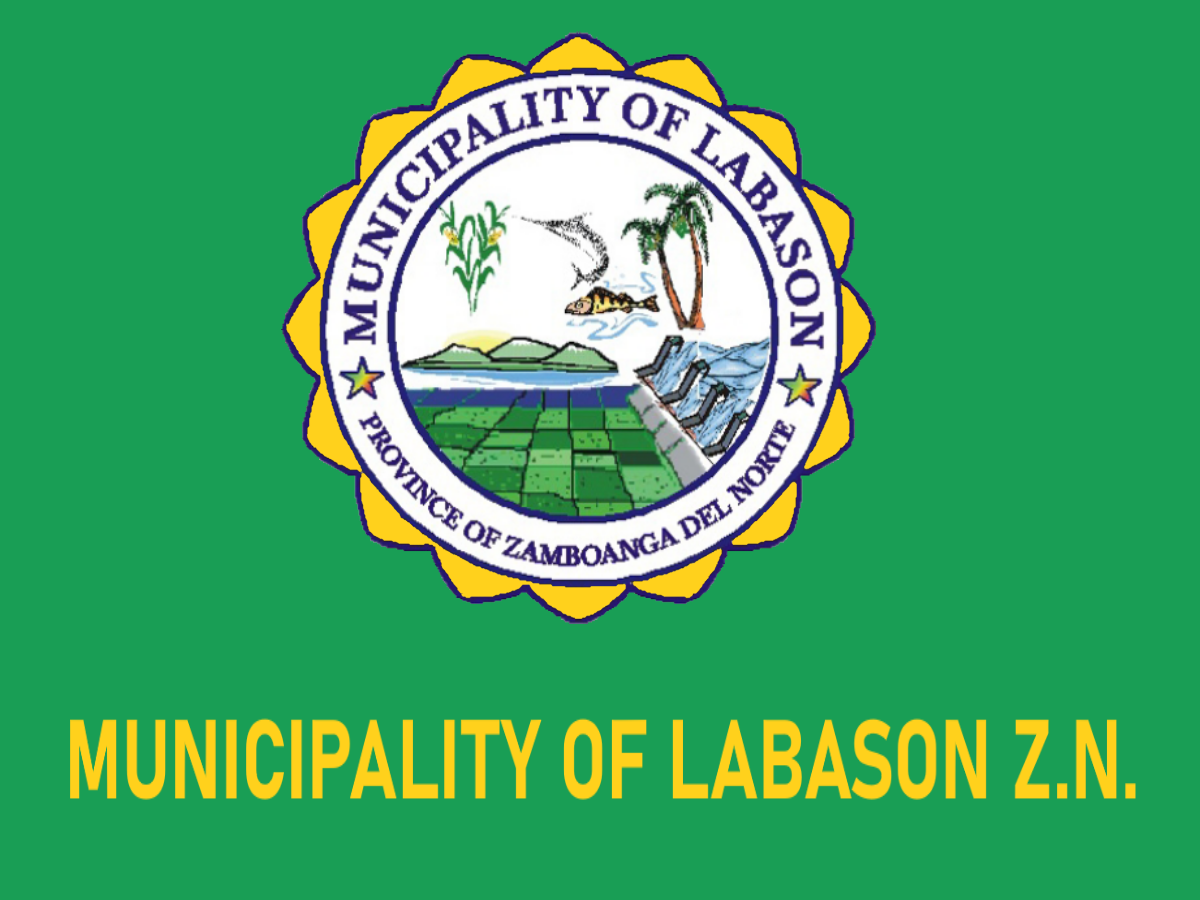
- Flag Seal
- Nickname: The Town of White Beaches
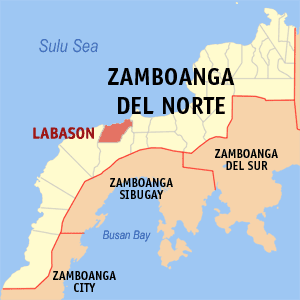
- Map of Zamboanga del Norte with Labason highlighted
- Interactive map of Labason
- Location within the Philippines
- Coordinates: 8°03′54″N 122°31′29″E
- Country: Philippines
- Region: Zamboanga Peninsula
- Province: Zamboanga del Norte
- District: 3rd district
- Founded: August 12, 1947
- Barangays: 20 (see Barangays)

Government
  - Type: Sangguniang Bayan
  - Mayor: Jelster Ed T. Quimbo (Lakas)
  - Vice Mayor: Virgilio J. Go (Lakas)
  - Representative: Adrian Michael A. Amatong (Liberal)
  - Municipal Council: Members: Pearl Annabelle B. Cabading; Eddie T. Quimbo; Elmer B. Digamon; Carmelito A. Buagas; Celestina F. Ybarley; Agapito O. Balili; Narcissus P. Villamil; Joenar D. Laput
  - Electorate: 33,125 voters (2025)

Area
  - Total: 169.58 km^{2} (65.48 sq mi)
- Elevation: 10.9 m (36 ft)
- Highest elevation: 669 m (2,195 ft)
- Lowest elevation: 0 m (0 ft)

Population (2024 census)
  - Total: 44,615
  - Density: 263.09/km^{2} (681.40/sq mi)
  - Households: 9,417

Economy
  - Income class: 2nd municipal income class
  - Poverty incidence: 47.65% (2023)
  - Revenue: ₱ 218.3 million (2024)
  - Assets: ₱ 880.7 million (2024)
  - Expenditure: ₱ 8.909 million (2024)
  - Liabilities: ₱ 124.4 million (2024)

Service provider
  - Electricity: Zamboanga del Norte Electric Cooperative (ZANECO)
  - Water: Labason Water District (LabWD)
- Time zone: UTC+8 (PST)
- ZIP code: 7119
- PSGC: 0907205000
- IDD : area code: +63 (0)65
- Native languages: Subanon; Cebuano; Chavacano; Tagalog
- Website: www.labason.gov.ph

Labason, officially the Municipality of Labason (Cebuano: Lungsod sa Labason; Subanen: Benwa Labason; Chavacano: Municipalidad de Labason; Tagalog: Bayan ng Labason), is a municipality in the province of Zamboanga del Norte, Philippines. According to the 2024 census, it has a population of 44,615 people.

Labason's commercial buildings have improved over the past years.

Murcielagos Island is within the municipal jurisdiction of Labason.

== Etymology ==
The name “Labason” before it came to be had a number of names. Several versions regarding its derivation were gathered, but the most widely known among them is that Labason is from the word “Lab-as”, a Visayan term which means “Fresh Fish”. This place was known for its abundance of fresh fish and it is till even up to now. Early traders called it “Lab-asan”.

== History ==
The original inhabitants of this place and other sitios were Subanons who lived a nomadic life. Later, Muslim missionaries claimed them as their subjects.

Economic and social conditions of the native were improved when Labason was made a Municipal District. The people taught and encouraged to plant crops, raised all sorts of agricultural products and domesticated farm animals.

In accordance with the Code of Mindanao and Sulu, on July 10, 1916, this place was transformed into a municipal district, making Panganuran the seat of government under Zamboanga. The extent of its jurisdiction was from Baliguian to Banigan. Due to the increase in population and other factors favorable to development that then existed, the seat of government was transferred from Panganuran to Labason.

Mandag Kawan, a Subano, was appointed as the first municipal district president with Don Juan Moro as the vice president. Later Don Juan Moro also became the first district president when Labason became the seat of government and then followed by District President Hatib Layling, a Muslim with Bagti Sangkayan as vice president.

Gil Sanchez, Sr. and Nemesio Fortich were the first Christian president and vice president respectively. They served their district from 1934 to 1937.

When Sindangan was created into a municipality, Labason became one of its barrios. Several years later, the socio-economic condition of Labason has improved and the people felt the need to be independent from Sindangan. Such wish was granted in 1948 where it became the first municipality to be carved out from its mother town.

By virtue of Executive Order (EO) No. 79 issued by President Manuel Roxas on August 12, 1947, the municipality of Labason was organized, separated from Sindangan. The municipality contains the barrios of Labason, designated as the seat of government, and La Libertad. It is the tenth municipality of the old Zamboanga province.

The municipality was inaugurated on January 24, 1948 (twenty-three days after the supposed effectivity) and the said order was the legal basis for the creation of new barrios, and the municipality's original: Dansalan, Kipit (Quipit; formerly a sitio of then-barrio Labason under the municipality of Sindangan) and Patawag. They are among the five barangays, of the municipality's twenty, created from its mother barrio, Labason.

In 1959, the sitios of Bacong, Gabong, Pitawe and Banga-an were constituted into the barrio of Pitawe. In 1979, by virtue of Batas Pambansa Blg. 19, ten barangays in the western part of the municipality, including Pitawe, were separated to create the municipality of Gutalac.

== Geography ==
=== Barangays ===
Labason is politically subdivided into 20 barangays. Each barangay consists of puroks while some have sitios.

- Antonino (Poblacion)
- Balas
- Bobongan
- Dansalan
- Gabu
- Gil Sanchez
- Imelda
- Immaculada
- Kipit
- La Union
- Lapatan
- Lawagan
- Lawigan
- Lopoc (Poblacion)
- Malintuboan
- New Salvacion
- Osukan
- Patawag
- San Isidro
- Ubay

=== Climate ===
Climate data for Labason, Zamboanga del Norte
Month	Jan	Feb	Mar	Apr	May	Jun	Jul	Aug	Sep	Oct	Nov	Dec	Year
Mean daily maximum °C (°F)	30 (86)	30 (86)	30 (86)	31 (88)	30 (86)	29 (84)	29 (84)	29 (84)	29 (84)	29 (84)	29 (84)	29 (84)	30 (85)
Mean daily minimum °C (°F)	23 (73)	23 (73)	23 (73)	24 (75)	25 (77)	25 (77)	24 (75)	24 (75)	25 (77)	25 (77)	24 (75)	23 (73)	24 (75)
Average precipitation mm (inches)	96 (3.8)	79 (3.1)	117 (4.6)	127 (5.0)	239 (9.4)	301 (11.9)	286 (11.3)	283 (11.1)	255 (10.0)	272 (10.7)	188 (7.4)	115 (4.5)	2,358 (92.8)
Average rainy days	17.3	16.0	19.7	21.6	29.0	29.0	29.7	29.1	28.5	28.9	25.3	20.0	294.1
Source: Meteoblue

== Demographics ==
Population census of Labason
Year	Pop.	±% p.a.
1939	5,745	—
1948	8,633	+4.63%
1960	14,204	+4.24%
1970	23,999	+5.38%
1975	32,879	+6.52%
1980	36,047	+1.86%
1990	24,994	−3.60%
1995	28,515	+2.50%
2000	33,528	+3.53%
2007	40,420	+2.61%
2010	40,375	−0.04%
2015	41,357	+0.46%
2020	43,934	+1.28%
2024	44,615	+0.37%
Source: Philippine Statistics Authority

== Economy ==
Poverty incidence of Labason (%)

Source: Philippine Statistics Authority
