= Gutalac =

Municipality in Zamboanga del Norte, Philippines

- Municipality
- Municipality of Gutalac
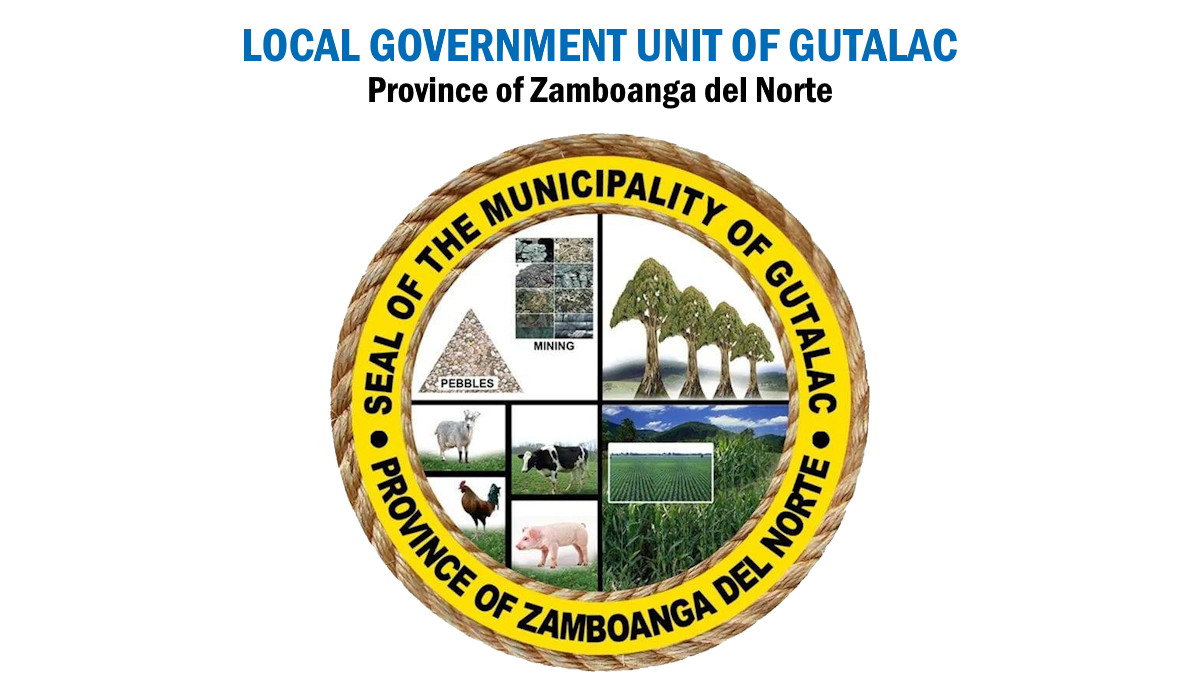
- Flag Seal

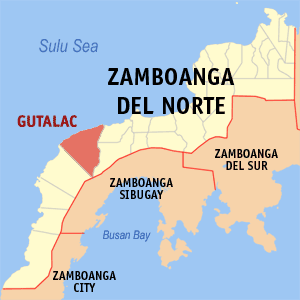
- Map of Zamboanga del Norte with Gutalac highlighted
- Interactive map of Gutalac
- Location within the Philippines
- Coordinates: 7°58′51″N 122°24′21″E
- Country: Philippines
- Region: Zamboanga Peninsula
- Province: Zamboanga del Norte
- District: 3rd district
- Founded: 1979
- Barangays: 33 (see Barangays)

Government
  - Type: Sangguniang Bayan
  - Mayor: Eddie Justin T. Quimbo (Lakas)
  - Vice Mayor: Aljohn M. Garzon (Lakas)
  - Representative: Adrian Michael A. Amatong (Liberal)
  - Municipal Council: Members: Arnold C. Dagodog; Onesimo L. Coma, Jr.; Cherie May L. Enero; Christine Monique V. Howa; Gina M. Garzon; Manuel M. Gato; Floro J. Serda, Jr; Wilfredo J. Landong
  - Electorate: 27,304 voters (2025)

Area
  - Total: 492.86 km^{2} (190.29 sq mi)
- Elevation: 130 m (430 ft)
- Highest elevation: 333 m (1,093 ft)
- Lowest elevation: 16 m (52 ft)

Population (2024 census)
  - Total: 37,512
  - Density: 76.111/km^{2} (197.13/sq mi)
  - Households: 9,109

Economy
  - Income class: 1st municipal income class
  - Poverty incidence: 43.39% (2023)
  - Revenue: ₱ 310.8 million (2024)
  - Assets: ₱ 735.4 million (2024)
  - Expenditure: ₱ 262.8 million (2024)
  - Liabilities: ₱ 309 million (2024)

Service provider
  - Electricity: Zamboanga del Norte Electric Cooperative (ZANECO)
- Time zone: UTC+8 (PST)
- ZIP code: 7108
- PSGC: 0907223000
- IDD : area code: +63 (0)65
- Native languages: Subanon; Cebuano; Chavacano; Tagalog
- Website: gutalac.zamboangadelnorte.com

Gutalac, officially the Municipality of Gutalac (Cebuano: Lungsod sa Gutalac; Subanen: Benwa Gutalac; Chavacano: Municipalidad de Gutalac; Tagalog: Bayan ng Gutalac), is a municipality in the province of Zamboanga del Norte, Philippines. According to the 2024 census, it has a population of 37,512 people.

== History ==
Records show that the territories comprising the municipality was part of the former municipality of Panganuran, which was created through Executive Order No. 116 signed by President Diosdado Macapagal on October 1, 1964 upon separation of nine "barrios and sitios" of Labason. The seat of government was designated at then Barrio Gutalac. However, its creation, among others, was declared void ab initio by the Supreme Court in its decision dated December 24, 1965.

By virtue of Batas Pambansa Blg. 19 issued on March 6, 1979, the municipality of Gutalac was organized upon separation of ten barangays in the western part of Labason, with Barangay Gutalac the seat of government. A plebiscite was held on April 17. It was officially created on December 22.

== Geography ==
=== Barangays ===
Gutalac is politically subdivided into 33 barangays. Each barangay consists of puroks while some have sitios.

- Bacong
- Bagong Silang
- Banganon
- Bayanihan
- Buenavista
- Canupong
- Cocob
- Datagan
- Imelda
- Immaculada Concepcion
- La Libertad
- Loay
- Lower Lux
- Lux
- Malian
- Mamawan
- Map
- Matunoy
- New Dapitan
- Panganuran
- Pitawe
- Pitogo
- Poblacion (Gutalac)
- Salvador
- San Isidro
- San Juan
- San Roque
- San Vicente
- Santo Niño
- Sas
- Sibalic
- Tipan
- Upper Gutalac

=== Climate ===
Climate data for Gutalac, Zamboanga del Norte
Month	Jan	Feb	Mar	Apr	May	Jun	Jul	Aug	Sep	Oct	Nov	Dec	Year
Mean daily maximum °C (°F)	29 (84)	29 (84)	30 (86)	30 (86)	29 (84)	28 (82)	28 (82)	28 (82)	28 (82)	28 (82)	28 (82)	29 (84)	29 (83)
Mean daily minimum °C (°F)	22 (72)	22 (72)	23 (73)	24 (75)	24 (75)	24 (75)	23 (73)	23 (73)	24 (75)	24 (75)	23 (73)	23 (73)	23 (74)
Average precipitation mm (inches)	98 (3.9)	78 (3.1)	116 (4.6)	115 (4.5)	222 (8.7)	281 (11.1)	272 (10.7)	282 (11.1)	237 (9.3)	258 (10.2)	180 (7.1)	108 (4.3)	2,247 (88.6)
Average rainy days	19.6	18.6	21.8	22.9	29.0	28.6	28.7	28.3	27.0	28.6	25.9	22.1	301.1
Source: Meteoblue

=== Famous Landmark ===
Manungos Hill is visited due to its overlooking view of the area.

== Demographics ==
Population census of Gutalac
Year	Pop.	±% p.a.
1980	10,405	—
1990	17,589	+5.39%
1995	25,022	+6.83%
2000	28,215	+2.61%
2007	29,883	+0.80%
2010	32,153	+2.70%
2015	34,654	+1.44%
2020	36,090	+0.86%
2024	37,512	+0.93%
Source: Philippine Statistics Authority

== Economy ==
Poverty incidence of Gutalac (%)

Source: Philippine Statistics Authority

=== Industry ===
Gutalac is home to the Gutalac Nickel Project of Florjenmar Mining and Development Corporation, the first and only large-scale mining company in the municipality.

=== Transportation ===
Rural Transit Mindanao, Inc. and Alga Bus Transport, Inc. service Gutalacnons going to Dipolog City, Ipil and Zamboanga City.

== Government ==
Mayors of the
Municipality of Gutalac
Mariano D. Candelaria, 1979-1986. 1988-1998
Eulalio Salcedo, 1986
Egbert Calumba, 1986-1987
Godofredo Dinapo, 1987-1988
Pet Angeli R. Carloto-Josue, 1998-2007
Angel M. Carloto, 2007-2010
Mariano C. Candelaria, Jr., 2010-2013
Onesimo L. Coma, Jr., 2013-2022
Eddie Justin T. Quimbo, 2022-present

Gutalac's local government structure is composed of one mayor, one vice mayor and eight councilors, named as Sangguniang Bayan members, all elected through popular vote. Three ex officio members are added to the Sangguniang Bayan with one representing Gutalac's 33 Barangay Captains being the Association of Barangay Councils (ABC) President, and one representing Gutalac's 33 Barangay Youth Council Presidents being the Sangunniang Kabataan (SK) Federation President. Each official, with the exemption of the ABC and SK Presidents, is elected publicly to a 3-year term and can be re-elected up to 3 terms in succession.

== Schools ==
There are 33 public elementary, three (3) basic high and one (1) senior high school in Gutalac.

=== Elementary Schools ===
==== Gutalac I ====
- Banganon ES
- Canuto Enerio ES
- Datagan ES
- Gutalac CS
- La Libertad ES
- Lower Lux ES
- Lux ES
- Matunoy PS
- Panganuran ES
- Pitogo ES
- Rosalina M. Carloto Mem. ES
- San Isidro ES
- San Juan ES
- San Roque ES
- San Vicente ES
- Sibalic ES

==== Gutalac II ====
- Bacong ES
- Bagong Silang ES
- Bayanihan ES
- Buenavista ES
- Canupong PS
- Cocob ES
- Gacsod ES
- Immaculada Concepcion ES
- Malian PS
- Mamawan ES

=== Basic High School ===
- Gutalac National High School
- Gutalac National High School- Canuto Enerio Ext.
- Gutalac National High School - Mamawan Annex

=== Senior High School ===
- Riverside Community School (General Academic Strand)
