= Kalawit =

Municipality in Zamboanga del Norte, Philippines

- Municipality
- Municipality of Kalawit
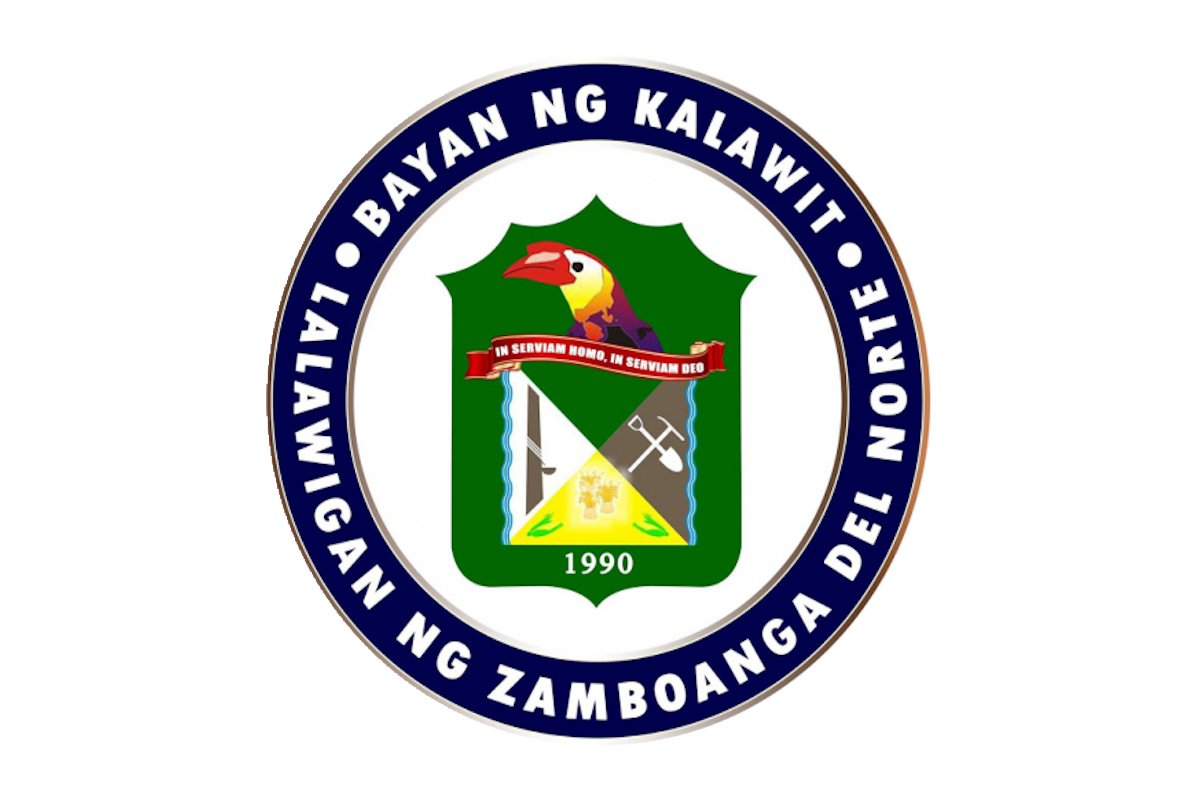
- Flag Seal
- Nickname: Carabao Capital of Mindanao
- Motto(s): In Serviam Homo, In Serviam Deo
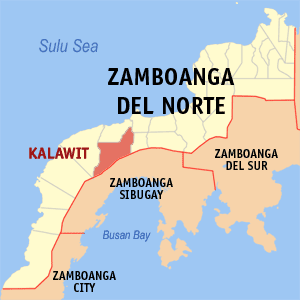
- Map of Zamboanga del Norte with Kalawit highlighted
- Interactive map of Kalawit
- Location within the Philippines
- Coordinates: 7°54′29″N 122°31′25″E
- Country: Philippines
- Region: Zamboanga Peninsula
- Province: Zamboanga del Norte
- District: 3rd district
- Barangays: 14 (see Barangays)

Government
  - Type: Sangguniang Bayan
  - Mayor: Arcel C. Antojado (Lakas)
  - Vice Mayor: Rey Y. Bihag (Lakas)
  - Representative: Adrian Michael A. Amatong (Liberal)
  - Municipal Council: Members: Edwin P. Dumajel; Richel A. Lañojan; Camilo C. Banao; Marlon O. Maata; George S. Lugsanay; Juvelyn S. Tan; Litley Vearl R. Pingkian; Junrey A. Laurencio
  - Electorate: 17,127 voters (2025)

Area
  - Total: 217.89 km^{2} (84.13 sq mi)
- Elevation: 133 m (436 ft)
- Highest elevation: 378 m (1,240 ft)
- Lowest elevation: 93 m (305 ft)

Population (2024 census)
  - Total: 23,381
  - Density: 107.31/km^{2} (277.92/sq mi)
  - Households: 5,763

Economy
  - Income class: 3rd municipal income class
  - Poverty incidence: 49.58% (2023)
  - Revenue: ₱ 163.8 million (2024)
  - Assets: ₱ 322.2 million (2024)
  - Expenditure: ₱ 89.09 million (2024)
  - Liabilities: ₱ 30.72 million (2024)

Service provider
  - Electricity: • Zamboanga del Norte Electric Cooperative (ZANECO)(northern area) • Zamboanga del Sur 2 Electric Cooperative (ZAMSURECO 2)(southern area)
- Time zone: UTC+8 (PST)
- ZIP code: 7124
- PSGC: 0907227000
- IDD : area code: +63 (0)65
- Native languages: Subanon; Cebuano; Chavacano; Tagalog
- Website: lgukalawit.gov.ph

Kalawit, officially the Municipality of Kalawit (Cebuano: Lungsod sa Kalawit; Subanen: Benwa Kalawit; Chavacano: Municipalidad de Kalawit; Tagalog: Bayan ng Kalawit), is a municipality in the province of Zamboanga del Norte, Philippines. According to the 2024 census, it has a population of 23,381 people.

It was created by virtue of Republic Act No. 6851 on February 10, 1990.

== Etymology ==
The town's name is a portmanteau of the words kalaw, the localized name for the rufous hornbill (Buceros hydrocorax) which inhabited the virgin areas of the place, and awit to which the hornbill provides a unique sound in song.

== Geography ==
=== Barangays ===
Kalawit is politically subdivided into 14 barangays. Each barangay consists of puroks while some have sitios.

- Batayan
- Botong
- Concepcion
- Daniel Maing (Dominolog)
- Fatima (Lacsutan)
- Gatas
- Kalawit (Poblacion)
- Marcelo
- New Calamba
- Palalian
- Paraiso
- Pianon
- San Jose
- Tugop

=== Climate ===
Climate data for Kalawit, Zamboanga del Norte
Month	Jan	Feb	Mar	Apr	May	Jun	Jul	Aug	Sep	Oct	Nov	Dec	Year
Mean daily maximum °C (°F)	29 (84)	29 (84)	30 (86)	30 (86)	29 (84)	29 (84)	28 (82)	28 (82)	29 (84)	28 (82)	29 (84)	29 (84)	29 (84)
Mean daily minimum °C (°F)	22 (72)	22 (72)	23 (73)	24 (75)	24 (75)	24 (75)	24 (75)	24 (75)	24 (75)	24 (75)	24 (75)	23 (73)	24 (74)
Average precipitation mm (inches)	96 (3.8)	79 (3.1)	117 (4.6)	127 (5.0)	239 (9.4)	301 (11.9)	286 (11.3)	283 (11.1)	255 (10.0)	272 (10.7)	188 (7.4)	115 (4.5)	2,358 (92.8)
Average rainy days	17.3	16.0	19.7	21.6	29.0	29.0	29.7	29.1	28.5	28.9	25.3	20.0	294.1
Source: Meteoblue

== Demographics ==
Population census of Kalawit
Year	Pop.	±% p.a.
1990	12,340	—
1995	17,352	+6.60%
2000	21,372	+4.57%
2007	21,758	+0.25%
2010	22,157	+0.66%
2015	23,633	+1.24%
2020	23,812	+0.16%
2024	23,381	−0.44%
Source: Philippine Statistics Authority

== Economy ==
Poverty incidence of Kalawit (%)

Source: Philippine Statistics Authority
