= Ian Amatong =

Filipino politician from the province of Zamboanga del Norte

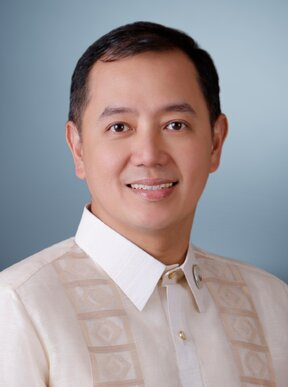
- Official portrait, 2025

Member of the Philippine House of Representatives from Zamboanga del Norte’s 3rd district
- Incumbent
- Assumed office June 30, 2022
- Preceded by: Isagani Amatong

Personal details
- Born: Adrian Michael Alto Amatong; April 20, 1978 (age 48) Dipolog, Zamboanga del Norte, Philippines
- Party: Liberal (2021–present)
- Education: University of the Philippines Los Baños (BA)

Adrian Michael Alto Amatong (born April 20, 1978), known as Ian Amatong, is a Filipino publisher and politician who has served as the representative for Zamboanga del Norte's third district since 2022.

== Early life ==
Amatong was born on April 20, 1978, the second of three children of Isagani Amatong and Anita Alto.

== Career ==
=== Publishing career ===
Amatong served as publisher and managing editor of the Mindanao Observer, a community newspaper owned by the Amatong family. Apart from this, he also served as one of the trustees for Mindanao of the Philippine Press Institute, a position he held since 2017.

=== Political career ===
Amatong's early political career started when he first ran for vice governor of Zamboanga del Norte in the 2007 local elections, but lost. He ran for a seat in the Zamboanga del Norte Provincial Board for the second legislative district, but lost likewise. After the election of his father Isagani as representative of the province's third legislative district, Amatong served as his chief-of-staff prior to his participation in the 2022 elections.

In 2022 Amatong ran for a seat for Zamboanga del Norte's third legislative district in the Philippine House of Representatives, to succeed his father. However, prior to election day, news was spread that Amatong supposedly announced his withdrawal from the congressional race, to which he vehemently denied rumors.

He won in this election against former representative Cesar Jalosjos and two other candidates.

House of Representatives of the Philippines
| Preceded by Isagani Amatong | Member of the House of Representatives from Zamboanga del Norte's 3rd district 2022-present | Incumbent |
