= 2025 Philippine local elections in the Zamboanga Peninsula =

- May 12, 2025
- Gubernatorial elections
- 4 provincial governors and 1 city mayor
Party	Seats	+/–
Lakas	3	+3
Nacionalista	1	0
PFP	1	+1
This lists parties that won seats. See the complete results below.
- Vice gubernatorial elections
- 4 provincial vice governors and 1 city vice mayor
Party	Seats	+/–
Lakas	2	+2
AZAP	1	New
Nacionalista	1	0
PFP	1	New
This lists parties that won seats. See the complete results below.
- Provincial Board elections
- 40 provincial board members and 16 city councilors
Party	Seats	+/–
Lakas	30	+23
PFP	9	+9
AZAP	6	+4
Nacionalista	4	0
Liberal	2	New
UNA	2	−3
Akbayan	1	New
Independent	2	+1
This lists parties that won seats. See the complete results below.

The 2025 Philippine local elections in the Zamboanga Peninsula were held on May 12, 2025.

== Summary ==
=== Governors ===
Province/city	Incumbent	Incumbent's party	Winner	Winner's party	Winning margin
Sulu	Abdusakur Mahail Tan	Lakas	Abdusakur Tan II	Lakas	92.56%
Zamboanga City (HUC)	John Dalipe	Lakas	Khymer Adan Olaso	Nacionalista	13.18%
Zamboanga del Norte	Rosalina Jalosjos	PFP	Darel Uy	Lakas	23.29%
Zamboanga del Sur	Victor Yu	PFP	Divina Grace Yu	Lakas	12.14%
Zamboanga Sibugay	Dulce Ann Hofer	PFP	Dulce Ann Hofer	PFP	23.92%

=== Vice governors ===
Province/city	Incumbent	Incumbent's party	Winner	Winner's party	Winning margin
Sulu	Abdusakur Tan II	Lakas	Abdusakur Mahail Tan	Lakas	93.52%
Zamboanga City (HUC)	Pinpin Pareja	Lakas	Beng Climaco	AZAP	28.04%
Zamboanga del Norte	Julius Napigquit	Lakas	Julius Napigquit	Lakas	28.02%
Zamboanga del Sur	Roseller Ariosa	PFP	Roseller Ariosa	PFP	25.28%
Zamboanga Sibugay	Rey Andre Olegario	Nacionalista	Ric-ric Olegario	Nacionalista	16.46%

=== Provincial boards ===
Province/city	Seats	Party control		Composition
Province/city	Seats	Previous	Result	Composition
Sulu	10 elected 3 ex-officio	PDP–Laban	Lakas	Lakas (10)
Zamboanga City (HUC)	16 elected 3 ex-officio	No majority	No majority	Lakas (6); AZAP (6); Nacionalista (2); Independent (2)
Zamboanga del Norte	10 elected 3 ex-officio	PDP–Laban	Lakas	Lakas (8); Liberal (2)
Zamboanga del Sur	10 elected 3 ex-officio	No majority	No majority	PFP (4); Lakas (4); UNA (2)
Zamboanga Sibugay	10 elected 3 ex-officio	No majority	No majority	PFP (5); Lakas (2); Nacionalista (2); Akbayan (1)

== Sulu ==
=== Governor ===
Incumbent Governor Abdusakur Mahail Tan of Lakas–CMD ran for vice governor. He was previously affiliated with PDP–Laban.

Lakas–CMD nominated Tan's son, Sulu vice governor Abdusakur Tan II, who won the election against Abdulwahid Sahidulla (Kilusang Bagong Lipunan).

Candidate	Party	Votes	%
Abdusakur Tan II	Lakas–CMD	362,986	96.28
Abdulwahid Sahidulla	Kilusang Bagong Lipunan	14,043	3.72
Total		377,029	100.00
Valid votes		377,029	95.30
Invalid/blank votes		18,575	4.70
Total votes		395,604	100.00
Registered voters/turnout		464,393	85.19
Lakas hold			
Source: Commission on Elections

=== Vice Governor ===
Incumbent Vice Governor Abdusakur Tan II of Lakas–CMD is running for governor of Sulu. He was previously affiliated with PDP–Laban.

Lakas–CMD nominated Tan's father, Sulu governor Abdusakur Mahail Tan, who won the election against Siyang Loong (Kilusang Bagong Lipunan).

Candidate	Party	Votes	%
Abdusakur Mahail Tan	Lakas–CMD	360,980	96.76
Siyang Loong	Kilusang Bagong Lipunan	12,080	3.24
Total		373,060	100.00
Valid votes		373,060	94.30
Invalid/blank votes		22,544	5.70
Total votes		395,604	100.00
Registered voters/turnout		464,393	85.19
Lakas hold			
Source: Commission on Elections

=== Provincial Board ===
The Sulu Provincial Board is composed of 13 board members, 10 of whom are elected.

Lakas–CMD won 10 seats, gaining a majority in the provincial board.

Party	Votes	%	Seats	+/–
Lakas–CMD	1,426,583	93.55	10	New
Kilusang Bagong Lipunan	98,296	6.45	0	New
Total	1,524,879	100.00	10	0
Total votes	395,604	–		
Registered voters/turnout	464,393	85.19		
Source: Commission on Elections

==== 1st district ====
Sulu's 1st provincial district consists of the same area as Sulu's 1st legislative district. Five board members are elected from this provincial district.

10 candidates were included in the ballot.

Candidate	Party	Votes	%
Lovely Izquierdo (incumbent)	Lakas–CMD	167,271	19.88
Malcon Tulawie	Lakas–CMD	165,786	19.71
Al-Minzhen Suhuri (incumbent)	Lakas–CMD	165,268	19.65
Nurshida Karanain (incumbent)	Lakas–CMD	161,300	19.17
Rayhana Taib	Lakas–CMD	151,661	18.03
Percival Tulawie	Kilusang Bagong Lipunan	8,380	1.00
Markazar Tandih	Kilusang Bagong Lipunan	5,985	0.71
Karlmarx Marrack	Kilusang Bagong Lipunan	5,833	0.69
Faizal Jul	Kilusang Bagong Lipunan	5,362	0.64
Hajir Idjirani	Kilusang Bagong Lipunan	4,384	0.52
Total		841,230	100.00
Total votes		223,061	–
Registered voters/turnout		262,367	85.02
Source: Commission on Elections

==== 2nd district ====
Sulu's 2nd provincial district consists of the same area as Sulu's 2nd legislative district. Five board members are elected from this provincial district.

Nine candidates were included in the ballot.

Candidate	Party	Votes	%
Sherhan Najar	Lakas–CMD	137,135	20.06
Alnur Arbison	Lakas–CMD	132,027	19.31
Alganarham Adam	Lakas–CMD	128,822	18.84
Abduradzmezer Burahan (incumbent)	Lakas–CMD	118,837	17.38
Radzmahal Sitin	Lakas–CMD	98,476	14.40
Nurwina Sahidulla (incumbent)	Kilusang Bagong Lipunan	37,453	5.48
Nurlita Talib	Kilusang Bagong Lipunan	16,523	2.42
William Basaluddin	Kilusang Bagong Lipunan	7,616	1.11
Seng Hussien	Kilusang Bagong Lipunan	6,760	0.99
Total		683,649	100.00
Total votes		172,543	–
Registered voters/turnout		202,026	85.41
Source: Commission on Elections

== Zamboanga City ==
=== Mayor ===
Incumbent Mayor John Dalipe of Lakas–CMD ran for the House of Representatives in Zamboanga City's 2nd legislative district. He was previously affiliated with the People's Reform Party.

Lakas–CMD nominated Dalipe's brother, representative Mannix Dalipe, who was defeated by representative Khymer Adan Olaso of the Nacionalista Party. Three other candidates ran for mayor.

On April 22, 2025, Orlando San Luis Negrete, an independent candidate, was found dead inside his home in Barangay Tumaga.

Candidate	Party	Votes	%
Khymer Adan Olaso	Nacionalista Party	169,345	47.49
Mannix Dalipe	Lakas–CMD	122,336	34.31
Pete Natividad	Independent	62,035	17.40
Dennier Ibbah	Independent	1,544	0.43
Orlando Negrete	Independent	1,326	0.37
Total		356,586	100.00
Valid votes		356,586	95.75
Invalid/blank votes		15,847	4.25
Total votes		372,433	100.00
Registered voters/turnout		483,058	77.10
Nacionalista gain from Lakas			
Source: Commission on Elections

=== Vice Mayor ===
Incumbent Pinpin Pareja of Lakas–CMD ran for the House of Representatives in Zamboanga City's 1st legislative district. She was previously affiliated with Partido Prosperidad y Amor Para na Zamboanga.

Lakas–CMD nominated city councilor Vino Guingona, who was defeated by former Zamboanga City mayor Beng Climaco of the Adelante Zamboanga Party. Sophia Taup (Independent) also ran for mayor.

Candidate	Party	Votes	%
Beng Climaco	Adelante Zamboanga Party	216,261	62.88
Vino Guingona	Lakas–CMD	119,826	34.84
Sophia Taup	Independent	7,857	2.28
Total		343,944	100.00
Valid votes		343,944	92.35
Invalid/blank votes		28,489	7.65
Total votes		372,433	100.00
Registered voters/turnout		483,058	77.10
AZAP gain from Lakas			
Source: Commission on Elections

=== City Council ===
The Zamboanga City Council is composed of 19 councilors, 16 of whom are elected.

Lakas–CMD tied with the Adelante Zamboanga Party at six seats each.

Party	Votes	%	Seats	+/–
Lakas–CMD	834,555	38.14	6	+5
Adelante Zamboanga Party	685,654	31.33	6	+4
Nacionalista Party	212,469	9.71	2	New
Partido Federal ng Pilipinas	20,525	0.94	0	0
Katipunan ng Kamalayang Kayumanggi	5,347	0.24	0	New
Independent	429,822	19.64	2	+2
Total	2,188,372	100.00	16	0
Total votes	372,433	–		
Registered voters/turnout	483,058	77.10		
Source: Commission on Elections

==== 1st district ====
Zamboanga City's 1st councilor district consists of the same area as Zamboanga City's 1st legislative district. Eight councilors are elected from this councilor district.

20 candidates were included in the ballot.

Candidate	Party	Votes	%
Mel Sadain	Nacionalista Party	98,028	9.80
Lit-Lit Macrohon (incumbent)	Independent	86,807	8.68
Dan Vicente (incumbent)	Adelante Zamboanga Party	77,338	7.73
Joel Esteban (incumbent)	Adelante Zamboanga Party	65,215	6.52
King Omaga (incumbent)	Lakas–CMD	62,311	6.23
Vladimir Jimenez	Nacionalista Party	62,371	6.24
Bong Atilano	Lakas–CMD	59,804	5.98
Divino Gracia Ramillano	Adelante Zamboanga Party	55,015	5.50
Jawo Jimenez	Lakas–CMD	53,697	5.37
Mike Cinco	Nacionalista Party	52,070	5.21
Boday Cabato	Lakas–CMD	48,165	4.82
Joey Santos (incumbent)	Lakas–CMD	44,489	4.45
Charlie Mariano (incumbent)	Lakas–CMD	44,322	4.43
Jackie Julian	Adelante Zamboanga Party	42,203	4.22
Gerky Valesco (incumbent)	Lakas–CMD	39,108	3.91
Poloy Olvinar	Lakas–CMD	36,339	3.63
Ruiz delos Santos	Independent	24,741	2.47
Ben Asdali	Partido Federal ng Pilipinas	20,525	2.05
Matthew Hosseini	Independent	15,317	1.53
Benji Diones	Independent	12,073	1.21
Total		999,938	100.00
Total votes		170,926	–
Registered voters/turnout		224,316	76.20
Source: Commission on Elections

==== 2nd district ====
Zamboanga City's 2nd councilor district consists of the same area as Zamboanga City's 2nd legislative district. Eight councilors are elected from this councilor district.

29 candidates were included in the ballot.

Candidate	Party	Votes	%
James Siason (incumbent)	Lakas–CMD	80,740	6.79
BG Guingona	Adelante Zamboanga Party	79,778	6.71
Jihan Edding (incumbent)	Lakas–CMD	77,059	6.48
Kim Villaflores	Lakas–CMD	66,062	5.56
Junnie Navarro	Lakas–CMD	58,253	4.90
Hannah Nuño	Adelante Zamboanga Party	57,718	4.86
Fred Atilano (incumbent)	Adelante Zamboanga Party	56,343	4.74
Rey Bayoging	Independent	55,027	4.63
Mary Joy Olaso	Adelante Zamboanga Party	53,186	4.48
Albert Castillo	Adelante Zamboanga Party	53,088	4.47
Cesar Iturralde	Adelante Zamboanga Party	51,972	4.37
Mike Alavar	Independent	50,610	4.26
Kim Elago	Independent	50,562	4.25
Eddie Saavedra (incumbent)	Adelante Zamboanga Party	49,522	4.17
Hecky Perez	Lakas–CMD	48,534	4.08
Bong Simbajon	Adelante Zamboanga Party	44,276	3.73
Banjung Aliangan	Lakas–CMD	42,633	3.59
VP Elago (incumbent)	Lakas–CMD	40,048	3.37
Chard Pajarito	Lakas–CMD	32,991	2.78
Al Warid Adjail	Independent	25,378	2.14
Ibs Turabin	Independent	24,847	2.09
Sonyboy Jalani	Independent	21,070	1.77
Jon Perez	Independent	20,018	1.68
Floyd Dizon	Independent	11,062	0.93
Rawda Nasaluddin	Independent	10,422	0.88
Nur-Aisa Awis	Independent	9,737	0.82
Armando Bucoy	Independent	6,509	0.55
Daniel Mendoza	Independent	5,642	0.47
Jesse Toribio	Katipunan ng Kamalayang Kayumanggi	5,347	0.45
Total		1,188,434	100.00
Total votes		201,507	–
Registered voters/turnout		258,742	77.88
Source: Commission on Elections

== Zamboanga del Norte ==
=== Governor ===
Incumbent Governor Rosalina Jalosjos of the Partido Federal ng Pilipinas (PFP) ran for mayor of Dipolog. She was previously affiliated with the Nacionalista Party.

The PFP nominated Jalosjos' son, Dapitan mayor Bullet Jalosjos, who was defeated by Dipolog mayor Darel Uy of Lakas–CMD. Javier Obnimaga (Independent) also ran for governor.

Candidate	Party	Votes	%
Darel Uy	Lakas–CMD	366,165	61.22
Bullet Jalosjos	Partido Federal ng Pilipinas	226,863	37.93
Javier Obnimaga	Independent	5,094	0.85
Total		598,122	100.00
Valid votes		598,122	91.29
Invalid/blank votes		57,064	8.71
Total votes		655,186	100.00
Registered voters/turnout		780,540	83.94
Lakas gain from PFP			
Source: Commission on Elections

=== Vice Governor ===
Incumbent Vice Governor Julius Napigquit of Lakas–CMD ran for a second term. He was previously affiliated with PDP–Laban.

Napigquit won re-election against former Dapitan administrator Wilberth Magallanes (Partido Federal ng Pilipinas).

Candidate	Party	Votes	%
Julius Napigquit (incumbent)	Lakas–CMD	348,789	64.01
Wilberth Magallanes	Partido Federal ng Pilipinas	196,106	35.99
Total		544,895	100.00
Valid votes		544,895	83.17
Invalid/blank votes		110,291	16.83
Total votes		655,186	100.00
Registered voters/turnout		780,540	83.94
Lakas hold			
Source: Commission on Elections

=== Provincial Board ===
The Zamboanga del Norte Provincial Board is composed of 13 board members, 10 of whom are elected.

Lakas–CMD won eight seats, winning a majority in the provincial board.

Party	Votes	%	Seats	+/–
Lakas–CMD	869,321	52.21	8	New
Partido Federal ng Pilipinas	461,422	27.71	0	New
Liberal Party	201,572	12.11	2	New
Nacionalista Party	126,478	7.60	0	–1
Independent	6,397	0.38	0	0
Total	1,665,190	100.00	10	0
Total votes	655,186	–		
Registered voters/turnout	780,540	83.94		
Source: Commission on Elections

==== 1st district ====
Zamboanga del Norte's 1st provincial district consists of the same area as Zamboanga del Norte's 1st legislative district. Two board members are elected from this provincial district.

Five candidates were included in the ballot.

Candidate	Party	Votes	%
Dario Mandantes	Lakas–CMD	80,557	29.28
Jimboy Chan	Lakas–CMD	77,296	28.09
Bing Balisado	Partido Federal ng Pilipinas	61,603	22.39
Mark Gerald Magsalay	Partido Federal ng Pilipinas	53,535	19.46
Wilfredo Jamolod	Independent	2,156	0.78
Total		275,147	100.00
Total votes		170,462	–
Registered voters/turnout		189,224	90.08
Source: Commission on Elections

==== 2nd district ====
Zamboanga del Norte's 2nd provincial district consists of the same area as Zamboanga del Norte's 2nd legislative district. Four board members are elected from this provincial district.

Nine candidates were included in the ballot.

Candidate	Party	Votes	%
Dante Bagarinao (incumbent)	Lakas–CMD	126,526	16.53
Peter Co (incumbent)	Lakas–CMD	121,843	15.92
Jojo Documento (incumbent)	Lakas–CMD	120,345	15.72
Chady Yebes	Lakas–CMD	118,084	15.43
Beverly Labadlabad	Partido Federal ng Pilipinas	87,027	11.37
Jasmin Pinsoy-Lagutin (incumbent)	Partido Federal ng Pilipinas	66,325	8.66
Ricky Mejorada	Partido Federal ng Pilipinas	61,406	8.02
Clyde Naong	Partido Federal ng Pilipinas	59,699	7.80
Noel Bandala	Independent	4,241	0.55
Total		765,496	100.00
Total votes		251,430	–
Registered voters/turnout		309,959	81.12
Source: Commission on Elections

==== 3rd district ====
Zamboanga del Norte's 3rd provincial district consists of the same area as Zamboanga del Norte's 3rd legislative district. Four board members are elected from this provincial district.

Seven candidates were included in the ballot.

Candidate	Party	Votes	%
Venus Uy	Lakas–CMD	113,661	18.20
Kay Marie Bolando (incumbent)	Lakas–CMD	111,009	17.77
Leo Mejorada (incumbent)	Liberal Party	102,774	16.46
JR Brillantes (incumbent)	Liberal Party	98,798	15.82
Boy Soriano	Nacionalista Party	74,398	11.91
Conkee Buctuan (incumbent)	Partido Federal ng Pilipinas	71,827	11.50
Ivan Patrick Ang	Nacionalista Party	52,080	8.34
Total		624,547	100.00
Total votes		233,294	–
Registered voters/turnout		281,357	82.92
Source: Commission on Elections

== Zamboanga del Sur ==
=== Governor ===
Incumbent Governor Victor Yu of the Partido Federal ng Pilipinas ran for mayor of Pagadian. He was previously affiliated with PDP–Laban.

Yu endorsed his wife, representative Divina Grace Yu (Lakas–CMD), who won the election against Dumalinao mayor Sweet Cerilles (Nationalist People's Coalition).

Candidate	Party	Votes	%
Divina Grace Yu	Lakas–CMD	320,389	56.07
Sweet Cerilles	Nationalist People's Coalition	251,035	43.93
Total		571,424	100.00
Valid votes		571,424	94.77
Invalid/blank votes		31,559	5.23
Total votes		602,983	100.00
Registered voters/turnout		712,955	84.58
Lakas gain from PFP			
Source: Commission on Elections

=== Vice Governor ===
Incumbent Vice Governor Roseller Ariosa of the Partido Federal ng Pilipinas ran for a third term. He was previously affiliated with PDP–Laban.

Ariosa won re-election against provincial board member Julu Dacal (Nationalist People's Coalition).

Candidate	Party	Votes	%
Roseller Ariosa (incumbent)	Partido Federal ng Pilipinas	321,985	62.64
Julu Dacal	Nationalist People's Coalition	191,999	37.36
Total		513,984	100.00
Valid votes		513,984	85.24
Invalid/blank votes		88,999	14.76
Total votes		602,983	100.00
Registered voters/turnout		712,955	84.58
PFP hold			
Source: Commission on Elections

=== Provincial Board ===
The Zamboanga del Sur Provincial Board is composed of 13 board members, 10 of whom are elected.

The Partido Federal ng Pilipinas tied with Lakas–CMD at four seats each.

Party	Votes	%	Seats	+/–
Nationalist People's Coalition	873,720	38.95	0	0
Partido Federal ng Pilipinas	538,031	23.98	4	+4
Lakas–CMD	517,163	23.05	4	+4
United Nationalist Alliance	296,767	13.23	2	0
Independent	17,694	0.79	0	–1
Total	2,243,375	100.00	10	0
Total votes	602,983	–		
Registered voters/turnout	712,955	84.58		
Source: Commission on Elections

==== 1st district ====
Zamboanga del Sur's 1st provincial district consists of the same area as Zamboanga del Sur's 1st legislative district. Five board members are elected from this provincial district.

11 candidates were included in the ballot.

Candidate	Party	Votes	%
Roger Saniel (incumbent)	United Nationalist Alliance	186,319	14.07
Michelle Espina	Partido Federal ng Pilipinas	167,677	12.66
Jun Ebarle (incumbent)	Partido Federal ng Pilipinas	164,756	12.44
Almando Sanoria	Lakas–CMD	161,302	12.18
Francisvic Villamero (incumbent)	Lakas–CMD	152,525	11.52
Jun Bajamunde	Nationalist People's Coalition	106,008	8.01
Mario Cerilles	Nationalist People's Coalition	103,771	7.84
Teng Marcaban	Nationalist People's Coalition	91,833	6.93
Kenken Uy	Nationalist People's Coalition	86,477	6.53
Mylo Quinto	Nationalist People's Coalition	85,843	6.48
Marilou Fuentes	Independent	17,694	1.34
Total		1,324,205	100.00
Total votes		364,196	–
Registered voters/turnout		429,807	84.73
Source: Commission on Elections

==== 2nd district ====
Zamboanga del Sur's 2nd provincial district consists of the same area as Zamboanga del Sur's 2nd legislative district. Five board members are elected from this provincial district.

10 candidates were included in the ballot.

Candidate	Party	Votes	%
John Regala (incumbent)	United Nationalist Alliance	110,448	12.02
Loloy Poloyapoy (incumbent)	Partido Federal ng Pilipinas	103,919	11.31
Dang Mariano (incumbent)	Lakas–CMD	102,204	11.12
Nanding dela Cruz (incumbent)	Partido Federal ng Pilipinas	101,679	11.06
Bebie Vidad (incumbent)	Lakas–CMD	101,132	11.00
Nonoy Ocapan	Nationalist People's Coalition	85,391	9.29
Jun Enerio	Nationalist People's Coalition	80,502	8.76
Mary Ann Cartalla	Nationalist People's Coalition	79,682	8.67
Greg Dayondon	Nationalist People's Coalition	78,107	8.50
Arnold Flores	Nationalist People's Coalition	76,106	8.28
Total		919,170	100.00
Total votes		238,787	–
Registered voters/turnout		283,148	84.33
Source: Commission on Elections

== Zamboanga Sibugay ==
=== Governor ===
Incumbent Governor Dulce Ann Hofer of the Partido Federal ng Pilipinas ran for a second term. She was previously affiliated with PDP–Laban.

Hofer won re-election against provincial board member Yvonne Palma (Lakas–CMD).

Candidate	Party	Votes	%
Dulce Ann Hofer (incumbent)	Partido Federal ng Pilipinas	211,433	61.96
Yvonne Palma	Lakas–CMD	129,783	38.04
Total		341,216	100.00
Valid votes		341,216	95.32
Invalid/blank votes		16,759	4.68
Total votes		357,975	100.00
Registered voters/turnout		428,422	83.56
PFP hold			
Source: Commission on Elections

=== Vice Governor ===
Incumbent Vice Governor Rey Andre Olegario of the Nacionalista Party retired.

The Nacionalista Party nominated Olegario's son, provincial board member Ric-ric Olegario, who won the election against two other candidates.

Candidate	Party	Votes	%
Ric-ric Olegario	Nacionalista Party	175,301	56.23
Chanti Olegario-Caperig	Lakas–CMD	123,978	39.77
Ren delos Reyes	Independent	12,453	3.99
Total		311,732	100.00
Valid votes		311,732	87.08
Invalid/blank votes		46,243	12.92
Total votes		357,975	100.00
Registered voters/turnout		428,422	83.56
Lakas hold			
Source: Commission on Elections

=== Provincial Board ===
The Zamboanga Sibugay Provincial Board is composed of 13 board members, 10 of whom are elected.

The Partido Federal ng Pilipinas won five seats, becoming the largest party in the provincial board.

Party	Votes	%	Seats	+/–
Lakas–CMD	557,512	43.09	2	–4
Partido Federal ng Pilipinas	427,135	33.01	5	New
Nacionalista Party	169,695	13.11	2	–1
Akbayan	73,329	5.67	1	New
Nationalist People's Coalition	66,240	5.12	0	New
Total	1,293,911	100.00	10	0
Total votes	357,975	–		
Registered voters/turnout	428,422	83.56		
Source: Commission on Elections

==== 1st district ====
Zamboanga Sibugay's 1st provincial district consists of the same area as Zamboanga Sibugay's 1st legislative district. Five board members are elected from this provincial district.

10 candidates were included in the ballot.

Candidate	Party	Votes	%
Jung-jung Yanga (incumbent)	Partido Federal ng Pilipinas	73,232	12.40
Jinky Mendoza	Partido Federal ng Pilipinas	71,336	12.08
Boyet Cabilao Yambao	Nacionalista Party	69,610	11.78
Ralph Hofer delos Santos	Partido Federal ng Pilipinas	65,219	11.04
Roger Lu	Partido Federal ng Pilipinas	61,032	10.33
Jessie Lagas (incumbent)	Lakas–CMD	57,559	9.74
Katrina Ann Palma	Lakas–CMD	56,323	9.53
Gary Buendia	Lakas–CMD	49,530	8.38
Love Silva	Lakas–CMD	45,183	7.65
Mercy Conturno	Lakas–CMD	41,690	7.06
Total		590,714	100.00
Total votes		151,458	–
Registered voters/turnout		179,359	84.44
Source: Commission on Elections

==== 2nd district ====
Zamboanga Sibugay's 2nd provincial district consists of the same area as Zamboanga Sibugay's 2nd legislative district. Five board members are elected from this provincial district.

10 candidates were included in the ballot.

Candidate	Party	Votes	%
Glenn Sabijon	Nacionalista Party	100,085	14.23
Pava Hofer	Partido Federal ng Pilipinas	99,535	14.15
Vic Javier	Lakas–CMD	89,231	12.69
Win Alibutdan	Akbayan	73,329	10.43
Nat-nat Eudela	Lakas–CMD	71,330	10.14
Pia Schuck	Nationalist People's Coalition	66,240	9.42
Raco Olegario	Lakas–CMD	58,723	8.35
Dantoy Oporto	Partido Federal ng Pilipinas	56,781	8.07
Nonoy Castillo	Lakas–CMD	56,201	7.99
Bob Chiong	Lakas–CMD	31,742	4.51
Total		703,197	100.00
Total votes		206,517	–
Registered voters/turnout		249,063	82.92
Source: Commission on Elections

== Election-related incidents ==
COMELEC designated 50% of the region's municipalities and cities as areas of concern.

On December 19, 2024, a reelectionist councilor was shot dead in Piñan, Zamboanga del Norte. On December 21, the provincial election supervisor of Sulu survived an ambush that killed his brother in Zamboanga City.

On May 7, the testing of voting machines at a polling station in Alicia, Zamboanga Sibugay was interrupted following a shootout between soldiers and unidentified gunmen that left one person dead. On May 10, a crowd crush at a reported payout for poll watchers in Zamboanga City left two people dead.

On polling day, one person was killed in clashes between rival political groups in Dinas, Zamboanga del Sur.
