= Jalosjos =

Jalosjos is a Filipino surname. Notable people with the surname include:

- Bullet Jalosjos (born 1979), Filipino businessman and politician
- Jon-jon Jalosjos (born 1971), Filipino businessman and politician
- Lana Jalosjos, Filipino politician, singer, and TV host
- Romeo Jalosjos Sr. (1940–2026), Filipino businessman, politician, and television producer
- Rommel Jalosjos (born 1973), Filipino businessman and politician
- Rosalina Jalosjos (born 1947), Filipino politician
