= 2013 Philippine House of Representatives elections in the Zamboanga Peninsula =

Philippine House of Representatives elections in the Zamboanga Peninsula, 2013
- May 13, 2013

9 seats of Zamboanga Peninsula in the House of Representatives
	First party	Second party
Party	Liberal	Nacionalista
Seats won	3	2
	Third party	Fourth party
Party	NUP	LDP
Seats won	2	1
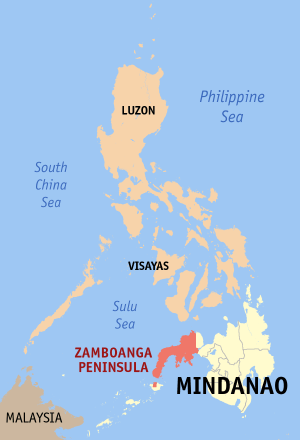
- Location of the Zamboanga Peninsula within the country.

Elections were held in Zamboanga Peninsula for seats in the House of Representatives of the Philippines on May 13, 2013.

The candidate with the most votes won that district's seat for the 16th Congress of the Philippines.

In Isabela, Basilan, although a part of this region, the voters elect their representative via Basilan's legislative district. Isabela is politically within Basilan despite being in a separate regions.

== Summary ==
Party	Popular vote	%	Swing	Seats won	Change
Liberal				4	
Nacionalista				2	
LDP				1	
NPC				1	
AZAP				0	
DPP				0	
NUP				0	
LM				0	
PMP				0	
UNA				0	
Independent				1	
Valid votes				9	
Invalid votes					
Turnout					
Registered voters					

== Zamboanga City ==
=== 1st District ===
Incumbent Maria Isabelle Climaco Salazar did not run for re-election; she ran for the mayorship instead. Incumbent Mayor Celso Lobregat was her party's nominee under the coalition of LDP-LP-AZAP.

The UNA-ZTZ coalition fielded former Monsignor Crisanto dela Cruz for the post. Dela Cruz previously run for the mayorship in 2007 and for the vice-mayorship in 2010. This was the second time where Dela Cruz and Mayor Lobregat went against each other; the previous time was in the 2007 mayoral elections.

2013 Philippine House of Representatives election at Zamboanga City's 1st district
Party	Candidate	Votes	%	±%
LDP	Celso Lobregat	42,826		
UNA	Crisanto Dela Cruz	32,234		
Independent	Cesar Climaco, Jr.			
PMP	Chrisler Cabarrubias			
Independent	Abdurahman Tagayan			
Margin of victory				
Rejected ballots				
Turnout				
LDP gain from Liberal		Swing		

=== 2nd District ===
Incumbent Erico Basilio Fabian was term limited and ran for the mayorship instead. He then formed a local coalition known as Fuerza Zamboanga, yielding District II Councilor Lilia Nuño to replace him.

The AZAP coalition nominated Mayor Lobregat's brother, Jose Lobregat.

The ZTZ coalition recruited former City Vice-Mayor Mannix Dalipe.

2013 Philippine House of Representatives election at Zamboanga City's 2nd district
Party	Candidate	Votes	%	±%
Independent	Lilia Nuño	33,475		
AZAP	Jose Lobregat	27,912		
UNA	Manuel Jose Dalipe	25,242		
Independent	Abelardo Climaco			
LM	Samuel Enesando			
Margin of victory				
Rejected ballots				
Turnout				
Independent gain from Nacionalista		Swing		

== Zamboanga del Norte ==
=== 1st District ===
Seth Frederick Jalosjos was the incumbent.

2013 Philippine House of Representatives election at Zamboanga del Norte's 1st district
Party	Candidate	Votes	%	±%
Nacionalista	Seth Frederick Jalosjos			
Liberal	Vicente Edgar Balisado			
Margin of victory				
Rejected ballots				
Turnout				
Nacionalista hold		Swing		

=== 2nd District ===
Rosendo Labadlabad was the incumbent. He faced incumbent governor Rolando Yebes.

2013 Philippine House of Representatives election at Zamboanga del Norte's 2nd district
Party	Candidate	Votes	%	±%
Liberal	Rosendo Labadlabad			
NUP	Rolando Yebes			
Margin of victory				
Rejected ballots				
Turnout				
Liberal hold		Swing		

=== 3rd District ===
Incumbent Cesar Jalosjos was term-limited, and Johanna Jalosjos-Parreño was the party's nominee. Former Zamboanga del Norte Governor Isagani S. Amatong ran against Jalosjos-Parreño.

2013 Philippine House of Representatives election at Zamboanga del Norte's 3rd district
Party	Candidate	Votes	%	±%
Liberal	Isagani S. Amatong			
Nacionalista	Johanna J. Parreño			
Margin of victory				
Rejected ballots				
Turnout				
Liberal gain from Nacionalista		Swing		

== Zamboanga del Sur ==
=== 1st District ===
Victor Yu was the incumbent.

2013 Philippine House of Representatives election at Zamboanga del Sur's 1st district
Party	Candidate	Votes	%	±%
NPC	Victor Yu	72,593		
Liberal	Samuel Co	50,026		
Margin of victory				
Rejected ballots				
Turnout				
NPC hold		Swing		

=== 2nd District ===
Aurora Cerilles was the incumbent.

2013 Philippine House of Representatives election at Zamboanga del Sur's 2nd district
Party	Candidate	Votes	%	±%
NPC	Aurora Cerilles	33,020		
Nacionalista	Marjorie "Cat" Jalosjos	19,374		
Independent	Rogelio Carbiera	370		
Margin of victory				
Rejected ballots				
Turnout				
NPC hold		Swing		

== Zamboanga Sibugay ==
=== 1st District ===
Incumbent Jonathan Cabilao Yambao did not run; his mother, former representative Belma Cabilao was the party's nominee.

2013 Philippine House of Representatives election at Zamboanga Sibugay's 1st district
Party	Candidate	Votes	%	±%
Nacionalista	Belma Cabilao			
Liberal	Wilter Palma II			
DPP	Sarah Karim			
PMP	Reynaldo Tecechian			
Margin of victory				
Rejected ballots				
Turnout				
Nacionalista hold		Swing		

=== 2nd District ===
Romeo Jalosjos Jr. was the incumbent.

2013 Philippine House of Representatives election at Zamboanga Sibugay's 2nd district
Party	Candidate	Votes	%	±%
Liberal	Dulce Ann Hofer			
Nacionalista	Romeo Jalosjos, Jr.			
Margin of victory				
Rejected ballots				
Turnout				
Liberal gain from Nacionalista		Swing		
