= 2022 Philippine local elections in the Zamboanga Peninsula =

- May 9, 2022
- Gubernatorial elections
- 3 provincial governors and 1 city mayor
| Party | Seats | +/– |
|---|---|---|
| PDP–Laban | 2 | −1 |
| Nacionalista | 1 | +1 |
| PRP | 1 | New |
This lists parties that won seats. See the complete results below.
- Vice gubernatorial elections
- 3 provincial vice governors and 1 city vice mayor
| Party | Seats | +/– |
|---|---|---|
| PDP–Laban | 2 | +1 |
| Nacionalista | 1 | 0 |
| PAZ | 1 | New |
This lists parties that won seats. See the complete results below.
- Provincial Board elections
- 30 provincial board members and 16 city councilors
| Party | Seats | +/– |
|---|---|---|
| PDP–Laban | 13 | −5 |
| Lakas | 7 | +6 |
| LDP | 7 | +4 |
| UNA | 5 | +2 |
| Nacionalista | 4 | −1 |
| PAZ | 3 | +1 |
| AZAP | 2 | +1 |
| PDDS | 2 | +2 |
| PPP | 1 | New |
| PRP | 1 | New |
| Independent | 1 | −3 |
This lists parties that won seats. See the complete results below.

The 2022 Philippine local elections in Zamboanga Peninsula were held on May 9, 2022.

== Summary ==
=== Governors ===
| Province/city | Incumbent | Incumbent's party | Winner | Winner's party | Winning margin |
|---|---|---|---|---|---|
| Zamboanga City (HUC) | Beng Climaco | PAZ | John Dalipe | PRP | 11.52% |
| Zamboanga del Norte | Roberto Uy | PDP–Laban | Rosalina Jalosjos | Nacionalista | 1.96% |
| Zamboanga del Sur | Victor Yu | PDP–Laban | Victor Yu | PDP–Laban | 26.05% |
| Zamboanga Sibugay | Wilter Palma | Lakas | Dulce Ann Hofer | PDP–Laban | 7.94% |

=== Vice governors ===
| Province/city | Incumbent | Incumbent's party | Winner | Winner's party | Winning margin |
|---|---|---|---|---|---|
| Zamboanga City (HUC) | Meng Agan | UNA | Pinpin Pareja | PAZ | 1.64% |
| Zamboanga del Norte | Senen Angeles | PDP–Laban | Julius Napigquit | PDP–Laban | 2.75% |
| Zamboanga del Sur | Roseller Ariosa | PDP–Laban | Roseller Ariosa | PDP–Laban | 14.79% |
| Zamboanga Sibugay | Rey Andre Olegario | Nacionalista | Rey Andre Olegario | Nacionalista | 24.08% |

=== Provincial boards ===
| Province/city | Seats | Party control | | Composition |
| Province/city | Seats | Previous | Result | Composition |
|---|---|---|---|---|
| Zamboanga City (HUC) | 16 elected 3 ex-officio | No majority | No majority | LDP (6); PAZ (3); UNA (3); AZAP (2); Lakas (1); PRP (1) |
| Zamboanga del Norte | 10 elected 3 ex-officio | PDP–Laban | PDP–Laban | PDP–Laban (9); Nacionalista (1) |
| Zamboanga del Sur | 10 elected 3 ex-officio | PDP–Laban | No majority | PDP–Laban (4); UNA (2); PDDS (2); PPP (1); Independent (1) |
| Zamboanga Sibugay | 10 elected 3 ex-officio | No majority | No majority | Lakas (6); Nacionalista (3); LDP (1) |

== Zamboanga City ==
=== Mayor ===
Term-limited incumbent Mayor Beng Climaco of the Partido Prosperidad y Amor Para na Zamboanga ran for the House of Representatives in Zamboanga City's 1st legislative district. She was previously affiliated with the Liberal Party.

Climaco endorsed representative Jawo Jimenez of the Nationalist People's Coalition, who was defeated by city councilor John Dalipe of the People's Reform Party. Former representative Celso Lobregat (Laban ng Demokratikong Pilipino), Zamboanga City vice mayor Meng Agan (United Nationalist Alliance) and four other candidates also ran for mayor.

| Candidate | Party | Votes | % |
|---|---|---|---|
| John Dalipe | People's Reform Party | 130,940 | 40.36 |
| Celso Lobregat | Laban ng Demokratikong Pilipino | 93,574 | 28.84 |
| Jawo Jimenez | Nationalist People's Coalition | 57,024 | 17.58 |
| Meng Agan | United Nationalist Alliance | 32,187 | 9.92 |
| Cesar Climaco | Independent | 5,873 | 1.81 |
| Abubakar Barahama | Partido Federal ng Pilipinas | 1,960 | 0.60 |
| Karim Ismail | Independent | 1,894 | 0.58 |
| Ephraim Ekong | Independent | 963 | 0.30 |
| Total | | 324,415 | 100.00 |
| Total votes | | 344,671 | – |
| Registered voters/turnout | | 445,240 | 77.41 |
| PRP gain from PAZ | | | |
Source: Commission on Elections

=== Vice Mayor ===
Incumbent Vice Mayor Meng Agan of the United Nationalist Alliance (UNA) ran for mayor of Zamboanga City.

UNA nominated city councilor Bong Atilano, who was defeated by city councilor Pinpin Pareja of the Partido Prosperidad y Amor Para na Zamboanga. City councilor BG Guingona Laban ng Demokratikong Pilipino) and two other candidates also ran for vice mayor.

| Candidate | Party | Votes | % |
|---|---|---|---|
| Pinpin Pareja | Partido Prosperidad y Amor Para na Zamboanga | 98,270 | 32.19 |
| BG Guingona | Laban ng Demokratikong Pilipino | 93,277 | 30.55 |
| Mel Sadain | Lakas–CMD | 84,363 | 27.63 |
| Bong Atilano | United Nationalist Alliance | 26,432 | 8.66 |
| Jul Julmunier | Independent | 2,983 | 0.98 |
| Total | | 305,325 | 100.00 |
| Total votes | | 344,671 | – |
| Registered voters/turnout | | 445,240 | 77.41 |
| PAZ gain from the UNA | | | |
Source: Commission on Elections

=== City Council ===
The Zamboanga City Council is composed of 19 councilors, 16 of whom are elected.

Laban ng Demokratikong Pilipino won six seats, becoming the largest party in the city council.

| Party | Votes | % | Seats | +/– |
|---|---|---|---|---|
| Laban ng Demokratikong Pilipino | 422,991 | 21.03 | 6 | –3 |
| Partido Prosperidad y Amor Para na Zamboanga | 372,267 | 18.51 | 3 | +1 |
| Lakas–CMD | 237,537 | 11.81 | 1 | 0 |
| Adelante Zamboanga Party | 235,561 | 11.71 | 2 | +1 |
| United Nationalist Alliance | 207,227 | 10.30 | 3 | +1 |
| People's Reform Party | 149,864 | 7.45 | 1 | New |
| National Unity Party | 110,263 | 5.48 | 0 | New |
| Partido Federal ng Pilipinas | 55,089 | 2.74 | 0 | –1 |
| PROMDI | 6,766 | 0.34 | 0 | New |
| Independent | 213,582 | 10.62 | 0 | 0 |
| Total | 2,011,147 | 100.00 | 16 | 0 |
| Total votes | 344,671 | – | | |
| Registered voters/turnout | 445,240 | 77.41 | | |

==== 1st district ====
Zamboanga City's 1st councilor district consists of the same area as Zamboanga City's 1st legislative district. Eight councilors are elected from this councilor district.

49 candidates were included in the ballot.

| Candidate | Party | Votes | % |
|---|---|---|---|
| Lit-lit Macrohon (incumbent) | Laban ng Demokratikong Pilipino | 67,505 | 6.89 |
| King Omaga (incumbent) | People's Reform Party | 62,154 | 6.35 |
| Joey Santos | Lakas–CMD | 51,096 | 5.22 |
| Boday Cabato | Laban ng Demokratikong Pilipino | 48,001 | 4.90 |
| Dan Vicente | Laban ng Demokratikong Pilipino | 47,627 | 4.86 |
| Charlie Mariano | United Nationalist Alliance | 44,727 | 4.57 |
| Gerky Valesco (incumbent) | Laban ng Demokratikong Pilipino | 43,464 | 4.44 |
| Joel Esteban | Partido Prosperidad y Amor Para na Zamboanga | 36,929 | 3.77 |
| Al Urao | Lakas–CMD | 33,942 | 3.47 |
| Gian Enriquez | Partido Prosperidad y Amor Para na Zamboanga | 31,820 | 3.25 |
| Rodel Agbulos | Adelante Zamboanga Party | 31,186 | 3.18 |
| Mike Cinco | National Unity Party | 29,348 | 3.00 |
| Pilarica Ledesma | Adelante Zamboanga Party | 28,171 | 2.88 |
| Marlon Torres | Lakas–CMD | 27,734 | 2.83 |
| Los Angeles | Partido Prosperidad y Amor Para na Zamboanga | 27,704 | 2.83 |
| Hardy Bayot | National Unity Party | 27,551 | 2.81 |
| Selina Espiritusanto | Partido Prosperidad y Amor Para na Zamboanga | 23,633 | 2.41 |
| Abdulwakil Kasim | Adelante Zamboanga Party | 22,524 | 2.30 |
| Lyn dela Peña | Independent | 22,338 | 2.28 |
| Al Alhabshi | Partido Prosperidad y Amor Para na Zamboanga | 22,100 | 2.26 |
| Quirico Duterte Jr. | Independent | 21,724 | 2.22 |
| Romy Bagongon | Lakas–CMD | 19,865 | 2.03 |
| Rey Modillas | People's Reform Party | 18,983 | 1.94 |
| Pepi Climaco | Independent | 18,914 | 1.93 |
| Marj Santa Teresa | Partido Prosperidad y Amor Para na Zamboanga | 17,772 | 1.81 |
| Nico Wee | People's Reform Party | 15,814 | 1.61 |
| Bendigong Asdali | Partido Federal ng Pilipinas | 13,716 | 1.40 |
| Hanina Alrefai | Partido Federal ng Pilipinas | 12,719 | 1.30 |
| Nursoud Abing | United Nationalist Alliance | 11,475 | 1.17 |
| Nurmina Jalani | Independent | 10,824 | 1.11 |
| Nel Hadjirani | Independent | 10,242 | 1.05 |
| Prody Alipuddin | Independent | 7,821 | 0.80 |
| Jerson Monteverde | Partido Federal ng Pilipinas | 7,817 | 0.80 |
| Sai Cagang | United Nationalist Alliance | 7,566 | 0.77 |
| Nelson Bautista | PROMDI | 6,766 | 0.69 |
| Jim Uddin | Independent | 6,092 | 0.62 |
| Jack Omar | Independent | 5,893 | 0.60 |
| Aldz Caluang | Independent | 4,757 | 0.49 |
| Bheeverly Estrella | Independent | 4,072 | 0.42 |
| Kiko Bazan | Independent | 3,924 | 0.40 |
| Rolando Tan | Independent | 3,609 | 0.37 |
| Krizzia May Fajardo | Independent | 3,436 | 0.35 |
| Ritchell Gregorio | Independent | 3,277 | 0.33 |
| Jams Rajam | Independent | 2,713 | 0.28 |
| April Joy Iwayan | Independent | 2,442 | 0.25 |
| Alcos Salido | Independent | 2,236 | 0.23 |
| Carl Comprendio | Independent | 2,159 | 0.22 |
| Resa Mae Ecot | Independent | 1,814 | 0.19 |
| Erwoodjave Nura | Independent | 1,518 | 0.15 |
| Total | | 979,514 | 100.00 |
| Total votes | | 164,444 | – |
| Registered voters/turnout | | 214,276 | 76.74 |
Source: Commission on Elections

==== 2nd district ====
Zamboanga City's 2nd councilor district consists of the same area as Zamboanga City's 2nd legislative district. Eight councilors are elected from this councilor district.

43 candidates were included in the ballot.

| Candidate | Party | Votes | % |
|---|---|---|---|
| Vino Guingona | Adelante Zamboanga Party | 73,929 | 7.17 |
| James Siason | Partido Prosperidad y Amor Para na Zamboanga | 61,953 | 6.01 |
| Lilibeth Nuño | Laban ng Demokratikong Pilipino | 60,534 | 5.87 |
| VP Elago (incumbent) | Adelante Zamboanga Party | 54,796 | 5.31 |
| Jimmy Villaflores (incumbent) | United Nationalist Alliance | 52,391 | 5.08 |
| Fred Atilano | Laban ng Demokratikong Pilipino | 52,224 | 5.06 |
| Jihan Edding (incumbent) | United Nationalist Alliance | 44,318 | 4.30 |
| Eddie Saavedra | Partido Prosperidad y Amor Para na Zamboanga | 39,218 | 3.80 |
| Hecky Perez | National Unity Party | 38,594 | 3.74 |
| Bong Simbajon | Laban ng Demokratikong Pilipino | 37,487 | 3.63 |
| Elong Natividad | Partido Prosperidad y Amor Para na Zamboanga | 36,276 | 3.52 |
| Richard Mariano | Laban ng Demokratikong Pilipino | 33,641 | 3.26 |
| Vita Agan | United Nationalist Alliance | 33,490 | 3.25 |
| Shaun Alavar | Laban ng Demokratikong Pilipino | 32,508 | 3.15 |
| Attang Mohammad Nur | Lakas–CMD | 30,097 | 2.92 |
| Tutu Candido | Lakas–CMD | 28,973 | 2.81 |
| Walmart Atilano | People's Reform Party | 28,929 | 2.80 |
| Cary Pioc | Adelante Zamboanga Party | 24,995 | 2.42 |
| Richard Pajarito | People's Reform Party | 23,984 | 2.32 |
| Joel Sanson | Lakas–CMD | 23,948 | 2.32 |
| Banjung Aliangan | Lakas–CMD | 21,882 | 2.12 |
| Jung Jung Macrohon | Partido Prosperidad y Amor Para na Zamboanga | 18,613 | 1.80 |
| Sonyboy Jalani | Partido Prosperidad y Amor Para na Zamboanga | 18,403 | 1.78 |
| Rose Iturralde | Independent | 18,290 | 1.77 |
| Marissa Aizon | National Unity Party | 14,770 | 1.43 |
| Percival Miravite | Partido Prosperidad y Amor Para na Zamboanga | 14,032 | 1.36 |
| Ibno Turabin | United Nationalist Alliance | 13,260 | 1.29 |
| Muhammad Amil | Independent | 12,376 | 1.20 |
| Philip Abuy | Partido Prosperidad y Amor Para na Zamboanga | 12,088 | 1.17 |
| Tiffany Joy Cabanlit | Partido Prosperidad y Amor Para na Zamboanga | 11,686 | 1.13 |
| Abubakar Jayari | Partido Federal ng Pilipinas | 7,329 | 0.71 |
| Ed Alvarez | Independent | 6,743 | 0.65 |
| Mhur Hadjirani | Independent | 6,443 | 0.62 |
| Sonny Boy Hussein | Partido Federal ng Pilipinas | 6,146 | 0.60 |
| Sirhan Hajul | Independent | 5,896 | 0.57 |
| Otoh Araji | Independent | 5,385 | 0.52 |
| Sammy Talib | Independent | 4,828 | 0.47 |
| Jesse Toribio | Independent | 4,603 | 0.45 |
| Teody Gomez | Partido Federal ng Pilipinas | 4,475 | 0.43 |
| Abdulfattah Kangal | Independent | 4,015 | 0.39 |
| Jane Alibasa | Independent | 3,099 | 0.30 |
| Naimz Idris | Partido Federal ng Pilipinas | 2,887 | 0.28 |
| Nursahaya Akin | Independent | 2,099 | 0.20 |
| Total | | 1,031,633 | 100.00 |
| Total votes | | 180,227 | – |
| Registered voters/turnout | | 230,964 | 78.03 |
Source: Commission on Elections

== Zamboanga del Norte ==
=== Governor ===
Term-limited incumbent Governor Roberto Uy of PDP–Laban ran for mayor of Dapitan.

PDP–Laban nominated former Dipolog mayor Belen Tang-Uy, who was defeated by Dapitan mayor Rosalina Jalosjos of the Nacionalista Party. Four other candidates also ran for governor.

| Candidate | Party | Votes | % |
|---|---|---|---|
| Rosalina Jalosjos | Nacionalista Party | 256,885 | 49.94 |
| Belen Tang-Uy | PDP–Laban | 246,785 | 47.98 |
| Eddie Sumalpong | Independent | 3,602 | 0.70 |
| Jun Cabigon | Independent | 2,952 | 0.57 |
| Bong Nueva | Partido Pederal ng Maharlika | 2,677 | 0.52 |
| Reynaldo Diputado | Independent | 1,478 | 0.29 |
| Total | | 514,379 | 100.00 |
| Total votes | | 608,377 | – |
| Registered voters/turnout | | 738,543 | 82.38 |
| Nacionalista gain from PDP–Laban | | | |
Source: Commission on Elections

=== Vice Governor ===
Term-limited incumbent Vice Governor Senen Angeles of PDP–Laban ran for vice mayor of Dipolog.

PDP–Laban nominated provincial board member Julius Napigquit, who won the election against former Zamboanga del Norte governor Lando Yebes (Nacionalista Party) and two other candidates.

| Candidate | Party | Votes | % |
|---|---|---|---|
| Julius Napigquit | PDP–Laban | 240,824 | 50.14 |
| Lando Yebes | Nacionalista Party | 227,594 | 47.39 |
| Michael Lumantao | Partido Pederal ng Maharlika | 6,425 | 1.34 |
| Dodoy Bala | Independent | 5,462 | 1.14 |
| Total | | 480,305 | 100.00 |
| Total votes | | 608,377 | – |
| Registered voters/turnout | | 738,543 | 82.38 |
| PDP–Laban hold | | | |
Source: Commission on Elections

=== Provincial Board ===
The Zamboanga del Norte Provincial Board is composed of 13 board members, 10 of whom are elected.

PDP–Laban won nine seats, maintaining its majority in the provincial board.

| Party | Votes | % | Seats | +/– |
|---|---|---|---|---|
| PDP–Laban | 847,395 | 62.42 | 9 | +2 |
| Nacionalista Party | 436,941 | 32.18 | 1 | –1 |
| Aggrupation of Parties for Prosperity | 61,310 | 4.52 | 0 | 0 |
| Partido Pederal ng Maharlika | 8,443 | 0.62 | 0 | New |
| Independent | 3,551 | 0.26 | 0 | 0 |
| Total | 1,357,640 | 100.00 | 10 | 0 |
| Total votes | 608,377 | – | | |
| Registered voters/turnout | 738,543 | 82.38 | | |

==== 1st district ====
Zamboanga del Norte's 1st provincial district consists of the same area as Zamboanga del Norte's 1st legislative district. Two board members are elected from this provincial district.

Four candidates were included in the ballot.

| Candidate | Party | Votes | % |
|---|---|---|---|
| Angel Jalosjos Carreon | Nacionalista Party | 67,947 | 28.26 |
| Jing Chan (incumbent) | PDP–Laban | 60,873 | 25.32 |
| Pete Zamora | PDP–Laban | 56,035 | 23.31 |
| Joy Olvis | Nacionalista Party | 55,552 | 23.11 |
| Total | | 240,407 | 100.00 |
| Total votes | | 157,923 | – |
| Registered voters/turnout | | 180,551 | 87.47 |
Source: Commission on Elections

==== 2nd district ====
Zamboanga del Norte's 2nd provincial district consists of the same area as Zamboanga del Norte's 2nd legislative district. Four board members are elected from this provincial district.

10 candidates were included in the ballot.

| Candidate | Party | Votes | % |
|---|---|---|---|
| Jasmin Pinsoy-Lagutin | PDP–Laban | 101,105 | 17.85 |
| Peter Co | PDP–Laban | 99,748 | 17.61 |
| Dante Bagarinao | PDP–Laban | 92,303 | 16.29 |
| Jojo Documento | PDP–Laban | 81,099 | 14.32 |
| Ed Yebes | Nacionalista Party | 61,798 | 10.91 |
| Nick Carbonel | Aggrupation of Parties for Prosperity | 61,310 | 10.82 |
| Raymond Acopiado | Nacionalista Party | 31,682 | 5.59 |
| Alex Gunao | Nacionalista Party | 29,516 | 5.21 |
| Jojo Porlas | Partido Pederal ng Maharlika | 4,386 | 0.77 |
| Noel Bandala | Independent | 3,551 | 0.63 |
| Total | | 566,498 | 100.00 |
| Total votes | | 234,036 | – |
| Registered voters/turnout | | 290,985 | 80.43 |
Source: Commission on Elections

==== 3rd district ====
Zamboanga del Norte's 3rd provincial district consists of the same area as Zamboanga del Norte's 3rd legislative district. Four board members are elected from this provincial district.

Nine candidates were included in the ballot.

| Candidate | Party | Votes | % |
|---|---|---|---|
| Kay Marie Bolando | PDP–Laban | 95,367 | 17.32 |
| Leo Mejorada | PDP–Laban | 92,761 | 16.84 |
| Conkee Buctuan | PDP–Laban | 89,213 | 16.20 |
| JR Brillantes | PDP–Laban | 78,891 | 14.32 |
| Boy Soriano (incumbent) | Nacionalista Party | 63,612 | 11.55 |
| Jojo Magallanes | Nacionalista Party | 53,561 | 9.73 |
| Cocoy Galon | Nacionalista Party | 43,626 | 7.92 |
| Jerry Mercado | Nacionalista Party | 29,647 | 5.38 |
| Argie Antigo | Partido Pederal ng Maharlika | 4,057 | 0.74 |
| Total | | 550,735 | 100.00 |
| Total votes | | 216,418 | – |
| Registered voters/turnout | | 267,007 | 81.05 |
Source: Commission on Elections

== Zamboanga del Sur ==
=== Governor ===
Incumbent Governor Victor Yu of PDP–Laban ran for a second term.

Yu won re-election against former Dumingag mayor Jun Pacalioga (People's Reform Party), former representative Aurora E. Cerilles (Nacionalista Party) and two other candidates.

| Candidate | Party | Votes | % |
|---|---|---|---|
| Victor Yu (incumbent) | PDP–Laban | 291,227 | 55.44 |
| Jun Pacalioga | People's Reform Party | 154,389 | 29.39 |
| Aurora E. Cerilles | Nacionalista Party | 69,234 | 13.18 |
| Shaira Yu Gustaham | Aksyon Demokratiko | 9,274 | 1.77 |
| Alex delos Santos | Independent | 1,148 | 0.22 |
| Total | | 525,272 | 100.00 |
| Total votes | | 585,072 | – |
| Registered voters/turnout | | 693,085 | 84.42 |
| PDP–Laban hold | | | |
Source: Commission on Elections

=== Vice Governor ===
Incumbent Vice Governor Roseller Ariosa of PDP–Laban ran for a second term. He was previously affiliated with the United Nationalist Alliance.

Ariosa won re-election against Ilang-ilang Co (People's Reform Party) and former Dumalinao mayor Ace Cerilles (Nacionalista Party).

| Candidate | Party | Votes | % |
|---|---|---|---|
| Roseller Ariosa (incumbent) | PDP–Laban | 241,920 | 49.91 |
| Ilang-ilang Co | People's Reform Party | 170,229 | 35.12 |
| Ace Cerilles | Nacionalista Party | 72,570 | 14.97 |
| Total | | 484,719 | 100.00 |
| Total votes | | 585,072 | – |
| Registered voters/turnout | | 693,085 | 84.42 |
| PDP–Laban hold | | | |
Source: Commission on Elections

=== Provincial Board ===
The Zamboanga del Sur Provincial Board is composed of 13 board members, 10 of whom are elected.

PDP–Laban remained as the largest party in the provincial board with four seats, but lost its majority.

| Party | Votes | % | Seats | +/– |
|---|---|---|---|---|
| PDP–Laban | 444,815 | 21.83 | 4 | –4 |
| Lakas–CMD | 264,429 | 12.98 | 0 | New |
| United Nationalist Alliance | 240,446 | 11.80 | 2 | +1 |
| Partido Federal ng Pilipinas | 210,530 | 10.33 | 0 | 0 |
| Pederalismo ng Dugong Dakilang Samahan | 205,817 | 10.10 | 2 | New |
| Partido Pilipino sa Pagbabago | 193,465 | 9.50 | 1 | New |
| Nationalist People's Coalition | 132,170 | 6.49 | 0 | 0 |
| Nacionalista Party | 116,300 | 5.71 | 0 | 0 |
| People's Reform Party | 102,208 | 5.02 | 0 | New |
| Independent | 127,306 | 6.25 | 1 | +1 |
| Total | 2,037,486 | 100.00 | 10 | 0 |
| Total votes | 585,072 | – | | |
| Registered voters/turnout | 693,085 | 84.42 | | |

==== 1st district ====
Zamboanga del Sur's 1st provincial district consists of the same area as Zamboanga del Sur's 1st legislative district. Five board members are elected from this provincial district.

16 candidates were included in the ballot.

| Candidate | Party | Votes | % |
|---|---|---|---|
| Julu Dacal (incumbent) | PDP–Laban | 158,915 | 13.33 |
| Roger Saniel (incumbent) | United Nationalist Alliance | 147,940 | 12.41 |
| Mapi Obaob | Pederalismo ng Dugong Dakilang Samahan | 132,410 | 11.11 |
| Francisvic Villamero (incumbent) | PDP–Laban | 118,902 | 9.98 |
| Jun Ebarle | Independent | 111,528 | 9.36 |
| Almando Sanoria (incumbent) | Partido Pilipino sa Pagbabago | 109,705 | 9.20 |
| Eric Bersales | Partido Federal ng Pilipinas | 96,106 | 8.06 |
| Rose Bolataolo | Lakas–CMD | 94,894 | 7.96 |
| Noli Garcia | Partido Federal ng Pilipinas | 81,282 | 6.82 |
| Jovy Mendoza | Partido Federal ng Pilipinas | 33,142 | 2.78 |
| Django Durano | Nacionalista Party | 26,045 | 2.19 |
| Mario Cerilles | Nationalist People's Coalition | 22,471 | 1.89 |
| Mylo Quinto | Nationalist People's Coalition | 16,697 | 1.40 |
| Dondon Rodrigo | Nationalist People's Coalition | 15,381 | 1.29 |
| Marilou Fuentes | Independent | 13,295 | 1.12 |
| Sultan Radsac Bago | Nationalist People's Coalition | 13,262 | 1.11 |
| Total | | 1,191,975 | 100.00 |
| Total votes | | 353,711 | – |
| Registered voters/turnout | | 415,735 | 85.08 |
Source: Commission on Elections

==== 2nd district ====
Zamboanga del Sur's 2nd provincial district consists of the same area as Zamboanga del Sur's 2nd legislative district. Five board members are elected from this provincial district.

16 candidates were included in the ballot.

| Candidate | Party | Votes | % |
|---|---|---|---|
| John Regala (incumbent) | United Nationalist Alliance | 92,506 | 10.94 |
| Dang Mariano (incumbent) | PDP–Laban | 85,570 | 10.12 |
| Loloy Poloyapoy (incumbent) | Partido Pilipino sa Pagbabago | 83,760 | 9.91 |
| Bebie Vidad (incumbent) | PDP–Laban | 81,428 | 9.63 |
| Nanding dela Cruz | Pederalismo ng Dugong Dakilang Samahan | 73,407 | 8.68 |
| Kurt Cajeta | Lakas–CMD | 61,539 | 7.28 |
| Ricky Chavez | Lakas–CMD | 59,096 | 6.99 |
| Dodong Pintac | People's Reform Party | 55,643 | 6.58 |
| Pastor Anlap | Lakas–CMD | 48,900 | 5.78 |
| Onan Dacula | People's Reform Party | 46,565 | 5.51 |
| Miguelito Ocapan | Nationalist People's Coalition | 36,172 | 4.28 |
| Danilo Dalid | Nacionalista Party | 32,622 | 3.86 |
| Jun Enerio | Nacionalista Party | 28,929 | 3.42 |
| Juneth Lanzaderas | Nacionalista Party | 28,704 | 3.39 |
| Edgar Montero | Nationalist People's Coalition | 28,187 | 3.33 |
| Elmer Rocha | Independent | 2,483 | 0.29 |
| Total | | 845,511 | 100.00 |
| Total votes | | 231,361 | – |
| Registered voters/turnout | | 277,350 | 83.42 |
Source: Commission on Elections

== Zamboanga Sibugay ==
=== Governor ===
Term-limited incumbent Governor Wilter Palma of Lakas–CMD ran for the House of Representatives in Zamboanga Sibugay's 1st legislative district. He was previously affiliated with PDP–Laban.

Lakas–CMD nominated Palma's son, representative Wilter Palma II, who was defeated by representative Dulce Ann Hofer of PDP–Laban. Two other candidates also ran for governor.

| Candidate | Party | Votes | % |
|---|---|---|---|
| Dulce Ann Hofer | PDP–Laban | 168,373 | 53.80 |
| Wilter Palma II | Lakas–CMD | 143,539 | 45.86 |
| Jose Policarpio Jr. | Independent | 763 | 0.24 |
| Peping Tu | Independent | 309 | 0.10 |
| Total | | 312,984 | 100.00 |
| Total votes | | 339,351 | – |
| Registered voters/turnout | | 422,062 | 80.40 |
| PDP–Laban gain from Lakas | | | |
Source: Commission on Elections

=== Vice Governor ===
Incumbent Vice Governor Rey Andre Olegario of the Nacionalista Party ran for a second term.

Olegario won re-election against Zamboanga Sibugay Liga ng mga Barangay president Jerry Lagas (Lakas–CMD).

| Candidate | Party | Votes | % |
|---|---|---|---|
| Rey Andre Olegario (incumbent) | Nacionalista Party | 166,977 | 62.04 |
| Jerry Lagas | Lakas–CMD | 102,160 | 37.96 |
| Total | | 269,137 | 100.00 |
| Total votes | | 339,351 | – |
| Registered voters/turnout | | 422,062 | 80.40 |
| Nacionalista hold | | | |
Source: Commission on Elections

=== Provincial Board ===
The Zamboanga Sibugay Provincial Board is composed of 13 board members, 10 of whom are elected.

The Lakas–CMD won six seats, becoming the largest party in the provincial board.

| Party | Votes | % | Seats | +/– |
|---|---|---|---|---|
| Lakas–CMD | 569,037 | 47.02 | 6 | New |
| Nacionalista Party | 295,303 | 24.40 | 3 | 0 |
| Partido Pilipino sa Pagbabago | 143,999 | 11.90 | 0 | New |
| Aksyon Demokratiko | 68,396 | 5.65 | 0 | New |
| PDP–Laban | 62,888 | 5.20 | 0 | 0 |
| Laban ng Demokratikong Pilipino | 57,026 | 4.71 | 1 | New |
| PROMDI | 12,047 | 1.00 | 0 | New |
| Independent | 1,562 | 0.13 | 0 | –4 |
| Total | 1,210,258 | 100.00 | 10 | 0 |
| Total votes | 339,351 | – | | |
| Registered voters/turnout | 422,062 | 80.40 | | |

==== 1st district ====
Zamboanga Sibugay's 1st provincial district consists of the same area as Zamboanga Sibugay's 1st legislative district. Five board members are elected from this provincial district.

10 candidates were included in the ballot.

| Candidate | Party | Votes | % |
|---|---|---|---|
| Yvonne Palma (incumbent) | Lakas–CMD | 61,300 | 11.57 |
| Allan Escamillan (incumbent) | Lakas–CMD | 59,991 | 11.33 |
| Jessie Lagas (incumbent) | Lakas–CMD | 59,776 | 11.28 |
| Jung-jung Yanga | Lakas–CMD | 58,964 | 11.13 |
| Marlo Bancoro | Laban ng Demokratikong Pilipino | 57,026 | 10.77 |
| Tata Castor-Tan | Partido Pilipino sa Pagbabago | 53,443 | 10.09 |
| Boyet Cabilao Yambao (incumbent) | Nacionalista Party | 51,961 | 9.81 |
| Cresencio Jore (incumbent) | Lakas–CMD | 49,490 | 9.34 |
| Bobby Musa | Partido Pilipino sa Pagbabago | 45,271 | 8.55 |
| Roger Lu | Partido Pilipino sa Pagbabago | 32,493 | 6.13 |
| Total | | 529,715 | 100.00 |
| Total votes | | 144,095 | – |
| Registered voters/turnout | | 176,027 | 81.86 |
Source: Commission on Elections

==== 2nd district ====
Zamboanga Sibugay's 2nd provincial district consists of the same area as Zamboanga Sibugay's 2nd legislative district. Five board members are elected from this provincial district.

14 candidates were included in the ballot.

| Candidate | Party | Votes | % |
|---|---|---|---|
| Ric-ric Olegario (incumbent) | Nacionalista Party | 87,514 | 12.86 |
| Bella Javier (incumbent) | Lakas–CMD | 84,793 | 12.46 |
| Jet Acosta | Nacionalista Party | 84,623 | 12.43 |
| Chennie delos Reyes | Nacionalista Party | 71,205 | 10.46 |
| Mec Rillera (incumbent) | Lakas–CMD | 70,398 | 10.34 |
| Glenn Sabijon | Aksyon Demokratiko | 68,396 | 10.05 |
| Rashida Loong | PDP–Laban | 62,888 | 9.24 |
| Ronnie Castillo | Lakas–CMD | 61,004 | 8.96 |
| Joel Ebol | Lakas–CMD | 39,164 | 5.75 |
| Wilborne Danda | Lakas–CMD | 24,157 | 3.55 |
| Gerald Al Mendoza | PROMDI | 12,047 | 1.77 |
| Glen Tubilan | Partido Pilipino sa Pagbabago | 8,086 | 1.19 |
| Bonifacio Ellevera | Partido Pilipino sa Pagbabago | 4,706 | 0.69 |
| Leo Taras | Independent | 1,562 | 0.23 |
| Total | | 680,543 | 100.00 |
| Total votes | | 195,256 | – |
| Registered voters/turnout | | 246,035 | 79.36 |
Source: Commission on Elections
