= Mayor of Dipolog =

Local chief executive of the city of Dipolog, Philippines

Mayor of Dipolog Mayor sa Dakbayan sa Dipolog
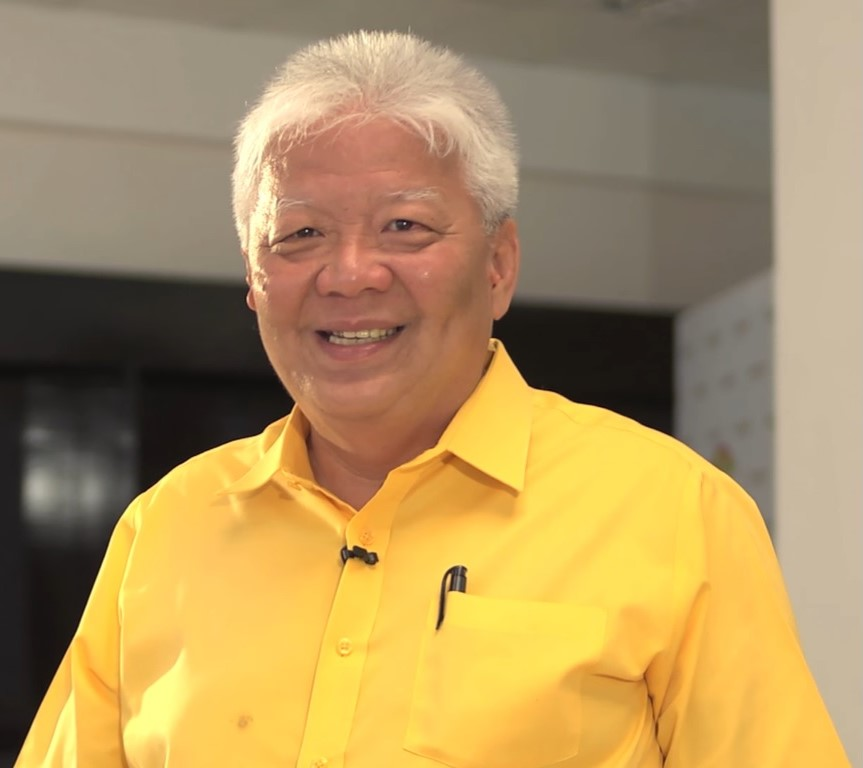
- Incumbent; Roberto "Berto" Y. Uy since June 30, 2025
- Style: The Honorable
- Seat: Dipolog City Hall, Central
- Appointer: Elected via popular vote
- Term length: 3 years, not eligible for re-election immediately after three consecutive terms
- Inaugural holder: Pascual T. Martinez (as a Municipality); Felicisimo L. Herrera (as a Chartered City)
- Formation: July 1, 1913 (as a Municipality); January 1, 1970 (as a Chartered City)
- Succession: Vice Mayor then highest ranking Sangguniang Panlungsod member
- Deputy: Vice Mayor

The mayor of Dipolog (Filipino: Punong Lungsod ng Dipolog, Cebuano: Mayor sa Dakbayan sa Dipolog) is the head of the executive branch of the government of Dipolog, Zamboanga del Norte, Philippines. The mayor holds office at the Dipolog City Hall.

Like all local government heads in the Philippines, the mayor is elected via popular vote, and may not be elected for a fourth consecutive term (although the former mayor may return to office after an interval of one term). In case of death, resignation or incapacity, the vice mayor becomes the mayor.

The mayor of Dipolog holds office at the Dipolog City Hall.

== History ==
Dipolog's history as a government unit is believed to have been established in 1834 when the Spanish Philippine government organized a civil government in the former Province of Misamis. The following capitans were appointed:

- Don Domingo Ruiz,
- Martino Belarmino,
- Francisco Magallanes,
- Victorio Gobune,
- someone with the surname of Toribio,
- Venancio Narvaez,
- Francisco Orbita,
- Bautista Narvaez,
- Martencio Yebes, and
- Sabino Bengua.

For another time, capitan was substituted to gobernadorcillo. The following men who had served the town as such were:

- Andres Velasco,
- Juan Abendano,
- Juan Baez,
- Andres Yebanes,
- Martillano Barrios,
- Pedro Ruiz,
- Pablo Narvaez,
- Tiburcio Sorronda,
- Matias Velasco,
- Marcelino Zorilla,
- Cirilo Sorronda,
- Gabina Orbita,
- Santos Yebanes, and
- Bonifacio Posadas.

Around January 1889, the Gobernadorcillo position is reverted to capitan before the occurrence of the Philippine Independence of 1898. The following were appointed to the position:

- Martin Fernandez,
- Tomas Narvacan,
- Eustaquio Cajocon,
- Simplicio Lacaya,
- Basilio Tabiliran,
- Maximiano Ruiz, and
- Bruno Ordinaria.

In 1900, the capitan designation was renamed presidente local, and then renamed again to municipal president from 1901 to the time Dipolog was reverted to a barrio of Dapitan in March 1904. The following served that position:

- Martin Fernandez,
- Diosdado Mercado,
- Gaudencio Zorilla, and
- Isidro Patangan (Municipal President, 1901 - March 1904).

In 1912, the Governor of the Department of Mindanao and Sulu, General John "Black Jack" Pershing granted the petition to separate Dipolog from Dapitan (which Dipolog was a barrio of since it was reverted to such in 1904), and reorganize as a municipality again. As Dipolog was made a municipality in 1913, Municipal President of Dapitan Pascual Tan Martinez, a citizen of Dipolog, was appointed as the Municipal President.

Republic Act No. 5520, the Charter of the City of Dipolog, was signed by Philippine President Ferdinand Marcos on June 23, 1969, and Dipolog became a city on January 1, 1970. Felicisimo Herrera, who was Municipal Mayor since 1963, became City Mayor on the day of its cityhood.

== Functions and duties ==
The Local Government Code of 1991 outlines the functions and duties of the city mayor as follows:

- Exercise general supervision and control over all programs, projects, services, and activities of the city government;
- Enforce all laws and ordinances relative to the governance of the city and in the exercise of the appropriate corporate powers provided for under Section 22 of the Code, implement all approved policies, programs, projects, services and activities of the city;
- Initiate and maximize the generation of resources and revenues, and apply the same to the implementation of development plans, program objectives and priorities as provided for under Section 18 of the Code, particularly those resources and revenues programmed for agro-industrial development and countryside growth and progress;
- Ensure the delivery of basic services and the provision of adequate facilities as provided for under Section 17 of the Code;
- Exercise such other powers and perform such other duties and functions as may be prescribed by law or ordinance.

== List ==
№	Image	Name	Term Began	Term Ended	Notes	Ref.
Appointed as Mayor of the Municipality of Dipolog
1		Pascual T. Martinez (Pascual Tan Martinez)	1913	1921	Appointed as Municipal President of Dapitan since 1910 prior to Dipolog's reestablishment.	
2		Paciano J. Ortega (Paciano Jarmin Ortega)	1922		Served in an ad interim position. Previously served as a municipal councilor in the first special local election, and then as municipal vice president in 1913.	
3		Gaudencio B. Bendijo (Gaudencio Borreos Bendijo)	1922		Served for only three months.	
4		Isabelo Z. Echavez (Isabelo Zorilla Echavez)	1922	1925	Served in an ad interim position.	
5		Geronimo Gonzales (Geronimo Adraincem Gonzales)	1926	1927		
6		Felipe B. Lacaya (Felipe Belarmino Lacaya)	1928		Served in an ad interim position.	
7		Fermin D. Kagatan (Fermin Darcera Kagatan)	1929	1930		
8		Gerino Z. Lailay (Gerino Zorilla Lailay)	1930	1935		
Elected as Mayor of the Municipality of Dipolog
(8)		Gerino Z. Lailay (Gerino Zorilla Lailay)	1936	1937		
9		Vicente Calibo (Vicente Acain Calibo)	1938	1946		
(7)		Fermin D. Kagatan (Fermin Darcera Kagatan)	1946	1955	Elected for a non-consecutive term.	
10		Pastor R. Bajamunde (Pastor Ranillo Bajamunde)	1956	1959		
11		Virginio B. Lacaya (Virginio Barbaso Lacaya)	1960	1963		
12		Felicisimo L. Herrera (Felicisimo Lao Herrera)	1963	1969	Last elected Municipal Mayor prior to cityhood.	
Mayor of the City of Dipolog
(12)		Felicisimo L. Herrera (Felicisimo Lao Herrera)	January 1970	May 1978	First City Mayor following cityhood.	
13		Roseller "Matoy" L. Barinaga (Roseller Lara Barinaga)	May 1978	April 1986	Previously served as vice mayor prior to becoming mayor.	
14		Dario B. Lacaya (Dario Barbaso Lacaya)	April 21, 1986	December 2, 1987	Served in an officer in charge (OIC) capacity.	
15		Luis C. Paloma (Luis Caindoy Paloma)	December 3, 1987	January 7, 1988	Served in an officer in charge (OIC) capacity. Previously served as vice mayor at an earlier time.	
16		Pascual B. Bajamunde (Pascual Binal Bajamunde)	January 8, 1988	February 1, 1988	Served in an officer in charge (OIC) capacity.	
(13)		Roseller "Matoy" L. Barinaga (Roseller Lara Barinaga)	February 2, 1988	March 27, 1998	Resigned to run for congressman of Zamboanga del Norte's 2nd congressional district, which includes Dipolog.	
17		Edelburgo "Bebs" L. Cheng (Edelburgo Lim Cheng)	March 27, 1998	June 30, 1998	Served in an acting capacity. Cheng was vice mayor from 1995 when he assumed as acting mayor after Mayor Barinaga's resignation, only to be re-elected as vice mayor in 1998.	
18		Roberto "Berto" Y. Uy (Roberto Yu Uy)	June 30, 1998	June 30, 2007	Previously served as officer in charge (OIC) Barangay Captain of Barangay Central for an unspecified period.	
19		Evelyn "Belen" T. Uy (Evelyn Tang Uy)	June 30, 2007	June 30, 2016	Served as First Lady of Dipolog during the tenure of Mayor Roberto Uy (1998 - 2007).	
20		Darel Dexter T. Uy (Darel Dexter Tang Uy)	June 30, 2016	June 30, 2025	Elected in 2016, 2019, and 2022.	
(18)		Roberto "Berto" Y. Uy (Roberto Yu Uy)	June 30, 2025	Present; Term expires June 30, 2028	Elected for a non-consecutive mandate in 2025, he previously served as Governor of Zamboanga del Norte (2013-2022) since his first mayorship.	

== Vice mayor of Dipolog ==
The Vice Mayor is the second-highest official of the city. The vice mayor is elected via popular vote; although most mayoral candidates have running mates, the vice mayor is elected separately from the mayor. This can result in the mayor and the vice mayor coming from different political parties.

The Vice Mayor is the presiding officer of the Dipolog City Council, although they can only vote as the tiebreaker. When a mayor is removed from office, the vice mayor becomes the mayor until the scheduled next election.

Senen O. Angeles (2004–2013, 2022–present) is the currently the vice mayor; he once served as City Councilor (2001–2004) and was Zamboanga del Norte Vice Governor (2013–2022).

== Post-mayoral life ==
After leaving office, a number of mayors have held various public positions and have made an effort to remain in the limelight.

- Virginio B. Lacaya became Governor of Zamboanga del Norte from 1967 until his retirement from politics in 1980.
- Roseller L. Barinaga became Congressman of the 2nd District of Zamboanga del Norte from 1998 until 2007. He ran for Mayor of Dipolog in 2007, 2nd District Congressman in 2010, and City Councilor in 2013 but was lost in those respective positions. He was then appointed as Undersecretary for Mindanao of the National Anti-Poverty Commission until his resignation to run for 2nd District Board Member of Zamboanga del Norte for the 2019 local elections to which he lost. He ran for and won as Dipolog councilor in the 2022 and 2025 local elections.
- Roberto Y. Uy ran for Governor of Zamboanga del Norte in 2007, but was defeated by incumbent Governor Rolando E. Yebes. He briefly retired from politics, until he successfully ran for, won as, and served as Governor of Zamboanga del Norte from 2013 to 2022.
- Evelyn T. Uy, after her tenure as City Mayor in 2016, made her run for City Mayor of Dapitan, Dipolog's neighboring city, in the 2019 local elections, but was defeated by incumbent Mayor Rosalina G. Jalosjos. She then made her run for Governor of Zamboanga del Norte facing Jalosjos again, but was defeated. She ran again for and successfully won as City mayor of Dapitan in the 2025 local elections.
- Darel Dexter T. Uy, after serving as Mayor of Dipolog from 2016 to 2025, he ran for Governor of Zamboanga del Norte in the 2025 local elections, where he faced Dapitan City Mayor Bullet Jalosjos. Uy won the gubernatorial race with 357,636 votes, defeating Jalosjos who garnered 220,084 votes, as of June 30, 2025.

== See also ==
- 2019 Zamboanga del Norte local elections
- Local government in the Philippines
