= Isagani Amatong =

Filipino politician from Zamboanga del Norte

Isagani S. Amatong

Member of the Philippine House of Representatives from Zamboanga del Norte's 3rd congressional district
- In office June 30, 2013 – June 30, 2022
- Preceded by: Cesar G. Jalosjos
- Succeeded by: Adrian Michael A. Amatong

Governor of Zamboanga del Norte
- In office June 30, 1998 – June 30, 2004
- Vice Governor: Concordio R. Adriatico (1998–2001); Eduardito S. Pacatang (2001–04)
- Preceded by: Roldan B. Dalman
- Succeeded by: Rolando E. Yebes
- In office March 26, 1986 – June 30, 1995
- Vice Governor: Concordio R. Adriatico (1986–88); Roldan B. Dalman (1988–92); Eduardito S. Pacatang (1992–95)
- Preceded by: Alberto Ubay
- Succeeded by: Roldan B. Dalman

Member of Dipolog City Council
- In office 1984–1986

Personal details
- Born: Isagani Sybico Amatong; October 19, 1940 (age 86) Dipolog, Zamboanga Province, Philippine Commonwealth
- Party: Liberal (2009–present)
- Other political affiliations: Lakas (until 2009)
- Relations: Juanita Amatong (sister-in-law); Jacobo Amatong (brother); Prospero Amatong (brother); Rommel Amatong (nephew)
- Education: University of the Philippines Diliman; Andres Bonifacio College
- Occupation: Lawyer, politician
- Nickname(s): Gani; Tatay Gani

Isagani Sybico Amatong (born October 19, 1940) is a Filipino politician from the province of Zamboanga del Norte. He last served as Congressman in the House of Representatives of the Philippines representing the 3rd legislative district of Zamboanga del Norte.

== Early years ==
Isagani Sybico Amatong was born in Dipolog, Province of Zamboanga, on October 19, 1940, to Amando Borja Amatong and Felicidad Mabanag Sybico who were founders of Andres Bonifacio College. He graduated elementary from Miputak Elementary School, and finished her secondary education at Andres Bonifacio College as a valedictorian. He obtained his pre-medicine from University of the Philippines Manila in 1960; earned his Bachelor of Arts in Economics and Master of Business Administration from University of the Philippines Diliman in 1964 and 1970 respectively. In 1970, he earned his Bachelor of Laws degree from Andres Bonifacio College, and then became a full-fledged lawyer the same year. He also finished his Master of Laws in UP Diliman.

== Career ==
Prior to his entry into politics, Amatong was a law associate. He also worked as a management consultant, a financial comptroller and trustee in Andres Bonifacio College, and founder-publisher for the Mindanao Observer.

In 1984, he was appointed as City Councilor of Dipolog after the death of his brother, Jacobo Amatong. He would then be appointed by former President Corazon Aquino to serve as Officer-in-Charge Governor of Zamboanga del Norte from 1986, until being elected as such in 1988 and 1992. After leaving the provincial capitol in 1995, he ran again for, won and served as Governor from 1998 to 2004. From there, he briefly retired from politics.

Amatong made his run for Governor in 2010 but was defeated. In 2013, he ran for Congressman of the 3rd District of Zamboanga del Norte and won. He would later on run for and win re-election bids in 2016 and 2019.

=== House of Representatives ===
In the 18th Congress, he is currently the minority leader of the House Committee on Accounts, and a member of the House Committees on Appropriations, Agriculture and Food, and Basic Education and Culture.

== Notable works ==
In 2017, Amatong introduced House Bill No. 5040 in the House of Representatives seeking to carve out a new province from Zamboanga del Norte. The proposed Zamboanga Hermosa province was to consist of 12 municipalities and 2 legislative districts that make up the 3rd legislative district of Zamboanga del Norte: Baliguian, Godod, Gutalac, Kalawit, Labason, Leon B. Postigo, Liloy (its proposed capital), Salug, Sibuco, Siocon, Sirawai, and Tampilisan. However, the bill ultimately did not pass the 16th congress.

In 2020, House Bill No. 4226 which Congressman Amatong authored in 2019 was approved by the House Committee on Basic Education. HB No. 4226 seeks to convert Siocon National High School in the far-flung municipality of Siocon into Siocon Science High School. This measured would be passed in to law as Republic Act No. 11629, and was signed by President Rodrigo Duterte in December 2021.

== Recognitions ==
In 2014, Amatong was one of the awardees of the UPAA Distinguished Awardees by the University of the Philippines Alumni Association for his role in Good Governance.

== Electoral history ==
2019 Philippine House of Representatives election in the Third District of Zamboanga del Norte
Party	Candidate	Votes	%
Liberal	Isagani S. Amatong (incumbent)	91,319	
Nacionalista	Norbideiri "Bong" Edding	68,418	
Total votes			
Liberal hold			

2010 Zamboanga del Norte gubernatorial election
Party	Candidate	Votes	%
Lakas–Kampi	Rolando Yebes (incumbent)	216,004	57.00
Liberal	Isagani S. Amatong	148,192	39.11
PDSP	Carlito Feras	9,354	2.47
Independent	Franklin Ubay	3,134	0.83
Independent	Bernardo Arboiz, Jr.	1,303	0.34
Independent	Rogelio Gumanas	936	0.25
Total votes		432,494	100.00

== Personal life ==
Amatong is married to Anita Alto Amatong, and have three children together including Adrian Michael.

== See also ==
- List of Philippine House committees
- Politics of the Philippines
- Congress of the Philippines
- Outline of the Philippines

Political offices
Preceded by Alberto Ubay	Governor of Zamboanga del Norte (first stint); 1986–1995	Succeeded by Roldan Dalman
Preceded by Roldan Dalman	Governor of Zamboanga del Norte (second stint); 1998–2004	Succeeded by Rolando Yebes
House of Representatives of the Philippines
Preceded by Cesar Jalosjos	Member of the House of Representatives from Zamboanga del Norte's 3rd district 2013–2022	Succeeded by Ian Amatong
