= Darel Uy =

11th Governor Zamboanga del Norte

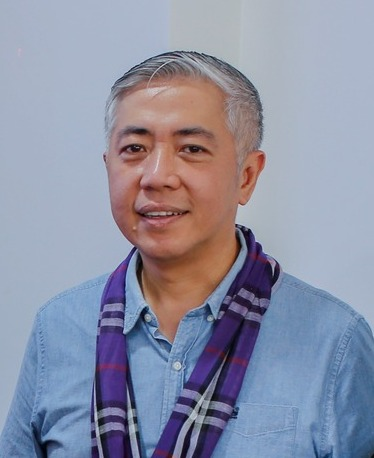
- Uy in 2025

11th Governor of Zamboanga del Norte
- Incumbent
- Assumed office June 30, 2025
- Vice Governor: Julius C. Napigquit
- Preceded by: Rosalina G. Jalosjos

20th Mayor of Dipolog
- In office June 30, 2016 – June 30, 2025
- Vice Mayor: Horacio Velasco (2016–2022); Senen O. Angeles (2022–2025)
- Preceded by: Evelyn T. Uy
- Succeeded by: Roberto Uy

Personal details
- Born: Darel Dexter Tang Uy; August 1, 1979 (age 47) Quezon City, Philippines
- Party: Lakas (2023–present)
- Other political affiliations: Liberal (2016–2018); PDP–Laban (2018–2023)
- Spouse: Vanessa Yu
- Relations: Roberto Uy (father); Pinpin Uy (brother)
- Children: 4
- Occupation: Politician

Darel Dexter Tang Uy (born August 1, 1979), is a Filipino politician who is the 11th Governor of Zamboanga del Norte, having been elected to the office in the 2025 Philippine local elections. Uy previously served as the 20th Mayor of Dipolog from 2016 until 2025, stepping down from the position upon assuming office as governor of Zamboanga del Norte on June 30, 2025.

== Political career ==
=== Mayor of Dipolog City (2016-2025) ===
Uy was elected Mayor of Dipolog City in 2016. He was subsequently re-elected for two more terms before he ran for the gubernatorial race in the 2025 local elections which he won.

=== Governor of Zamboanga del Norte (since 2025) ===
Uy was elected as the 11th Governor of Zamboanga del Norte in the 2025 Philippine local elections. He assumed office on June 30, 2025, taking on the responsibilities of managing Zamboanga del Norte and implementing local programs and policies.

=== Controversy ===
In 2024, two employees of the Zamboanga del Norte provincial government filed cases before the Office of the Ombudsman against Uy and his father, then former governor Berto Uy, accusing them of graft over the donation of P925.58 million worth of equipment belonging to the provincial government to local governments.

== Electoral history ==
Electoral history of Darel Uy
Year	Office	Party	Votes received				Result
Year	Office	Party	Total	%	P.	Swing	Result
2016	Mayor of Dipolog	Liberal	34,432	62.73%	1st	—N/a	Won
2019	Mayor of Dipolog	PDP-Laban	34,060	53.38%	1st	—N/a	Won
2022	Mayor of Dipolog	PDP-Laban	34,067	50.75%	1st	—N/a	Won
2025	Governor of Zamboanga del Norte	Lakas	366,165	61.22%	1st	—N/a	Won

Political offices
Preceded by Evelyn T. Uy	Mayor of Dipolog; 2016-2025	Succeeded by Roberto Y. Uy
Preceded by Rosalina G. Jalosjos	Governor of Zamboanga del Norte; 2025-present	Incumbent
