= Roberto Uy =

Filipino politician from the province of Zamboanga del Norte

The Honorable Roberto Y. Uy
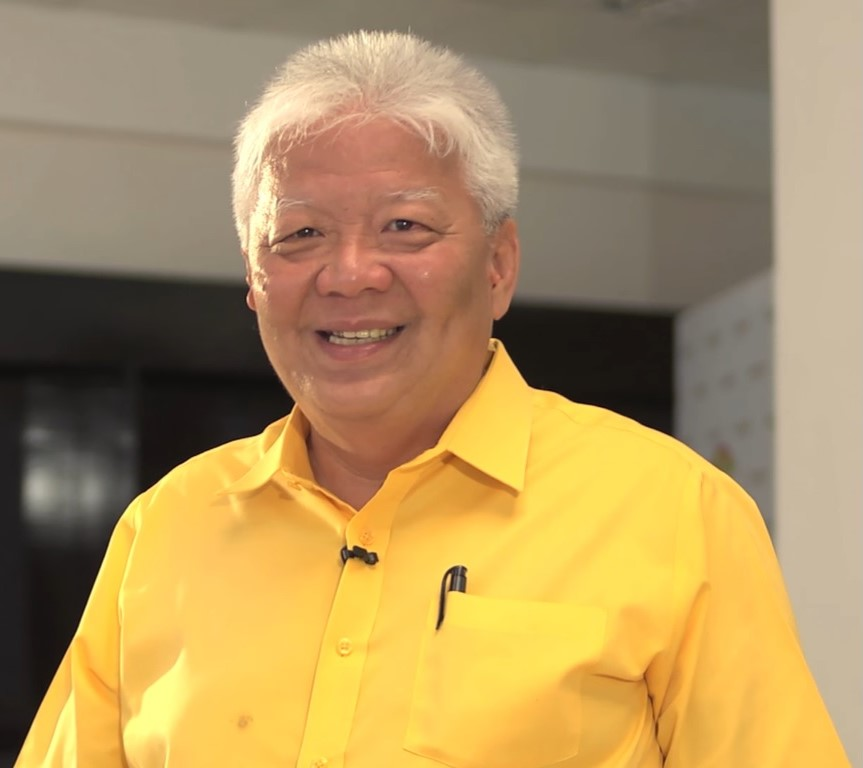
- Uy in 2016

18th Mayor of Dipolog
- Incumbent
- Assumed office June 30, 2025
- Vice Mayor: Senen O. Angeles
- Preceded by: Darel Dexter T. Uy
- In office June 30, 1998 – June 30, 2007
- Vice Mayor: Edelburgo L. Cheng (1998–2004); Senen O. Angeles (2004–2007)
- Preceded by: Edelburgo L. Cheng
- Succeeded by: Evelyn T. Uy

9th Governor of Zamboanga del Norte
- In office June 30, 2013 – June 30, 2022
- Vice Governor: Senen O. Angeles
- Preceded by: Rolando E. Yebes
- Succeeded by: Rosalina G. Jalosjos

Personal details
- Born: Roberto Yu Uy; December 28, 1952 (age 73) Mapang, Rizal, Zamboanga del Norte, Philippines
- Party: Lakas–CMD (1998-2009; 2023–present)
- Other political affiliations: PDP–Laban (2018–2023); Liberal (2009–2018)
- Education: Adamson University; Chiang Kai Shek College
- Occupation: Businessman politician
- Nickname: Berto

Roberto Yu Uy, also known as Berto Uy (born December 28, 1952) is a Filipino businessman of Chinese ancestral descent, and a politician from the province of Zamboanga del Norte in the Philippines. He previously served as a Governor of Zamboanga del Norte and is currently serving as the Mayor of Dipolog for a second time since he first served from 1998 to 2007.

== Early life and career ==
Uy was born on December 28, 1952, in Mapang, Rizal, Zamboanga del Norte. He is the fifth of seven siblings of Isaias Uy and Francisca Yu. His parents are businesspeople who paved the way in boosting Dipolog's local business scene. He took up his elementary education at Dipolog Chinese School (now Dipolog Community School), then he took up his secondary studies at Chiang Kai Shek College in Manila. He took up a Bachelor of Science in Mechanical Engineering at Adamson University.

Prior to politics, he worked with his father in managing their family businesses, which include a hotel and pension house, a fast food restaurant, a hardware store, and trading of copra.

== Political career ==
Uy started in politics when he served as Officer in Charge-Barangay Captain of Barangay Central, an urban barangay of Dipolog.

=== Mayor of Dipolog ===
Thereafter, Uy was elected and sworn as Mayor of Dipolog from 1998 to 2007. As he was term-limited and barred from running for a fourth term, Uy ran for Governor of Zamboanga del Norte in 2007 but was defeated by then-Governor Rolando E. Yebes. Uy briefly retired from politics and returned to his business endeavors.

=== Governor of Zamboanga del Norte ===
In 2013, Uy made his return to politics after being elected as Governor of Zamboanga del Norte in 2013, defeating 3rd legislative district Representative Cesar Jalosjos, and in 2016 against former Governor Yebes.

In 2019, another candidate for governor ran under the name "Roberto Escobido Uy", which is similar to Uy's name, and used the same nickname. The Commission on Elections declared the candidacy of "Roberto Escobido Uy" as nuisance, making the incumbent governor the legitimate candidate to participate. The decision was affirmed by the Supreme Court of the Philippines months after the election. Uy won the 2019 election against 1st legislative district Representative Bullet Jalosjos and "Escobido Uy," securing a third and final term in office.

== Controversies ==
=== Corruption charges ===
In 2016, Uy and two other provincial officials were sued by the City Government of Dapitan over the alleged illegal extraction or quarrying of sand and gravel in Dapitan's remote Barangay Aseniero, conducted by the Provincial Engineering Office since 2014. In 2024, two employees of the Zamboanga del Norte provincial government filed cases before the Office of the Ombudsman against Uy and his son, Dipolog mayor Darel Dexter Uy, accusing them of graft over the donation of P925.58 million worth of equipment belonging to the provincial government to local governments.

=== Suspension ===
Sometime after being reelected in the 2016 local election, Uy was suspended by the Office of the Ombudsman for three months for simple misconduct. The Ombudsman found Uy guilty of simple misconduct for the termination of 6 Provincial Government employees, hired under the administration of former Governor Rolando Yebes, since assuming office in 2013.

=== Illegal drug connections ===
In a privilege speech made in the House of Representatives on September 21, 2016, Rep. Seth Frederick "Bullet" Jalosjos of Zamboanga del Norte's 1st District linked Uy and the police to the drug trade in the province. Uy, who at the time was facing suspension for simple misconduct by the Ombudsman, denied the claims made, and challenged Jalosjos to a debate which led to a congressional hearing right after.

== Electoral history ==
Electoral history of Roberto Uy
Year	Office	Party	Votes received				Result
Year	Office	Party	Total	%	P.	Swing	Result
1998	Mayor of Dipolog		—N/a	—N/a	1st	—N/a	Won
2001	Mayor of Dipolog		—N/a	—N/a	1st	—N/a	Won
2004	Mayor of Dipolog		—N/a	—N/a	1st	—N/a	Won
2007	Governor of Zamboanga del Norte	Lakas	135,933	39.34	1st	—N/a	Lost
2013	Governor of Zamboanga del Norte	Liberal	98,477	55.72	1st	—N/a	Won
2016	Governor of Zamboanga del Norte	Liberal	241,690	58.98	1st	—N/a	Won
2019	Governor of Zamboanga del Norte	PDP-Laban	219,412	46.91	1st	—N/a	Won
2022	Mayor of Dapitan	PDP-Laban	16118	46.27	2nd	—N/a	Lost
2025	Mayor of Dipolog	Lakas	46,756	59.76	1st	—N/a	Won

== Personal life ==
He is married to Evelyn Tang Uy who also served as mayor of Dipolog (2007–2016) & now mayor of Dapitan (2025–present), and had 7 children together, including Roberto Uy Jr. or "Pin-Pin" who was mayor of Polanco (2013–2016) and Congressman of the 1st District of Zamboanga del Norte (2023–present), and Darel Dexter who served as mayor of Dipolog (2016–2025) & now governor of Zamboanga del Norte (2025–present). Both Pinpin and Darel were businessmen working in their family's businesses prior to joining politics.

Uy is a devout Christian and occasionally preaches at sunday services at his Church.

Political offices
Preceded by Edelburgo L. Cheng	Mayor of Dipolog (first stint); 1998–2007	Succeeded by Evelyn T. Uy
Preceded by Rolando E. Yebes	Governor of Zamboanga del Norte; 2013–2022	Succeeded by Rosalina G. Jalosjos
Preceded by Darel Dexter T. Uy	Mayor of Dipolog (second stint); 2025-present	Incumbent
