= Lana Jalosjos =

Filipina singer, TV host, and politician

Mayor of Baliangao, Misamis Occidental
- In office June 30, 2010 – June 30, 2013
- Preceded by: Agne V. Yap Sr.
- Succeeded by: Agne V. Yap Sr.

Personal details
- Born: Svetlana Pal Jalosjos Philippines
- Party: Liberal (2012–present)
- Other political affiliations: Lakas–CMD (2009–2012)
- Spouse: Jonathan de Leon
- Parent(s): Romeo Jalosjos Sr. Lourna Pal
- Relatives: Romeo Jalosjos Jr. (half-brother); Bullet Jalosjos (brother)
- Occupation: Singer, host, politician

Svetlana Pal Jalosjos-de Leon (professionally known as Lana Jalosjos) is a Filipina singer, politician, and former TV host of the longest afternoon running variety show Eat Bulaga!, aired on GMA Network.

== Family ==
She is the daughter of Romeo G. Jalosjos, a former Congressman of Zamboanga del Norte, and a sister of Bullet Jalosjos, who previously served as Board member and congressman of Zamboanga del Norte. She stayed at the Dakak Beach Resort in Dapitan while managing the singing competition and variety show called G-Idol in Dapitan from 2008 to 2009.

== Political career ==
Jalosjos-de Leon ran for and won as mayor of Baliangao, Misamis Occidental in the 2010 local elections, defeating incumbent mayor Agne V. Yap. She ran for re-election in 2013 facing Yap again but was defeated.

== Filmography ==
- Eat Bulaga! - host (2004–2006)
- G-Idol - host (2008–2009)
