= Rosalina Jalosjos =

Filipino politician (1947–2026)

The Honorable Rosalina Jalosjos
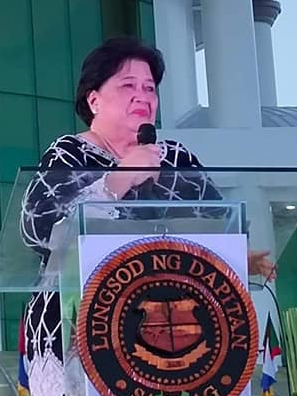
- Jalosjos giving a speech in Dapitan, 2022

10th Governor of Zamboanga del Norte
- In office June 30, 2022 – June 30, 2025
- Vice Governor: Julius C. Napigquit
- Preceded by: Roberto Uy
- Succeeded by: Darel Dexter T. Uy

10th Mayor of Dapitan
- In office June 30, 2013 – June 30, 2022
- Vice Mayor: Ruben Cad (2013–2019); Jimmy Patrick Israel Chan (2019–2022)
- Preceded by: Agapito Cardino
- Succeeded by: Bullet Jalosjos

Member of the Dapitan City Council
- In office June 30, 2010 – June 30, 2013

Personal details
- Born: Rosalina Garcia Jalosjos; May 1, 1947 Isabela City, Basilan, Philippines
- Died: August 13, 2026 (aged 79) (Note: An obituary for Rosalina Jalosjos listed her death as August 13, 2026, while Philippine news sources listed her death as August 14, 2026.) Houston, Texas, U.S.
- Party: PFP (2024–2026); APP (local party; 2009–2026)
- Other political affiliations: Nacionalista (2012–2024); Lakas (2009–2012)
- Relations: Romeo Jalosjos Sr. (brother); Bullet Jalosjos (nephew); Romeo Jalosjos Jr. (nephew); Rommel Jalosjos (nephew); Lana Jalosjos (niece); Angel Jalosjos Carreon (niece)
- Occupation: Politician
- Nickname: Nene

Rosalina Garcia Jalosjos (May 1, 1947 – August 13, 2026), known locally as Nene Jalosjos, was a Filipino politician from the province of Zamboanga del Norte. She served as the 10th Governor of Zamboanga del Norte from 2022 to 2025.

== Political career ==
Jalosjos first started her political career when she was elected as member of the Dapitan City Council from 2010 to 2013.

She would go on to run for mayor of Dapitan, and won against Agapito Cardino (who only assumed office in January 2013 after the Commission on Elections nullified her brother then-Mayor Dominador Jalosjos Jr.'s 2010 victory) in 2013, 2016, and in a hotly contested 2019 election against former Dipolog City mayor Evelyn Uy where disqualification cases were filed by the Jalosjos camp to question Uy's residency requirement.

As her term as mayor was to end, she made her run as governor of Zamboanga del Norte where she faced Evelyn Uy again and four other candidates in the 2022 elections. From there, she went on to win the gubernatorial race, and take over the reins from the Uy family since the Jalosjos family's political defeat by the Uy family in 2013.

In the 2025 local elections, she ran for mayor of Dipolog City facing Roberto Uy, but was defeated.

== Personal life and death ==
Jalosjos was the sister of businessman and former Zamboanga del Norte First District congressman Romeo Jalosjos Sr., who was removed from Congress in 2002 following his conviction for raping a child, businessman and former Third District congressman Cesar Jalosjos, former First District congresswoman and Piñan mayor Cecilia "Cely" Jalosjos-Carreon, former Dapitan mayor Dominador "Jun" Jalosjos Jr., and former Zamboanga del Norte First District board member Anabel "Bebing" Jalosjos-Garcia.

Former Dapitan mayor Bullet Jalosjos, former representative Romeo Jalosjos Jr., incumbent First District board member Angel Jalosjos Carreon, former Baliangao, Misamis Occidental mayor Svetlana Jalosjos-de Leon, and former Zamboanga Sibugay governor Rommel Jalosjos are her nephews.

Jalosjos was married to American-born David Johnson and had three children together. She died on August 13, 2026 while on hospice care in Houston, Texas (August 14 in the Philippines), at the age of 79, 12 days after the death of her brother Romeo. Her remains were brought from Houston to Dapitan City on September 29, 2026, with her body being sent to Zamboanga City on October 2, 2026 for her burial there two days later.

== Notes ==
Political offices
Preceded by Agapito J. Cardino	Mayor of Dapitan; 2013–2022	Succeeded by Seth Frederick P. Jalosjos
Preceded by Roberto Y. Uy	Governor of Zamboanga del Norte; 2022–2025	Succeeded by Darel Dexter T. Uy
