= Governor of Zamboanga del Norte =

Local chief executive

- Gobernador sa Probinsya sa Zamboanga del Norte (in Cebuano)
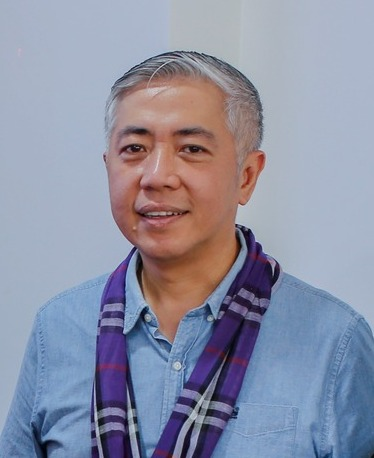
- Incumbent; Darel Dexter T. Uy since June 30, 2025
- Style: Honorable Governor
- Residence: Zamboanga del Norte Provincial Capitol, Dipolog
- Term length: 3 years, not eligible for re-election immediately after three consecutive terms
- Inaugural holder: Felipe B. Azcuna
- Formation: 1952
- Website: Province of Zamboanga del Norte Official Website

The governor of Zamboanga del Norte is the local chief executive of the Philippine province of Zamboanga del Norte. The governor holds office at the Zamboanga del Norte Provincial Capitol. Like all local government heads in the Philippines, the governor is elected via popular vote, and may not be elected for a fourth consecutive term (although the former governor may return to office after an interval of one term). In case of death, resignation or incapacity, the vice governor becomes the governor.

== History ==
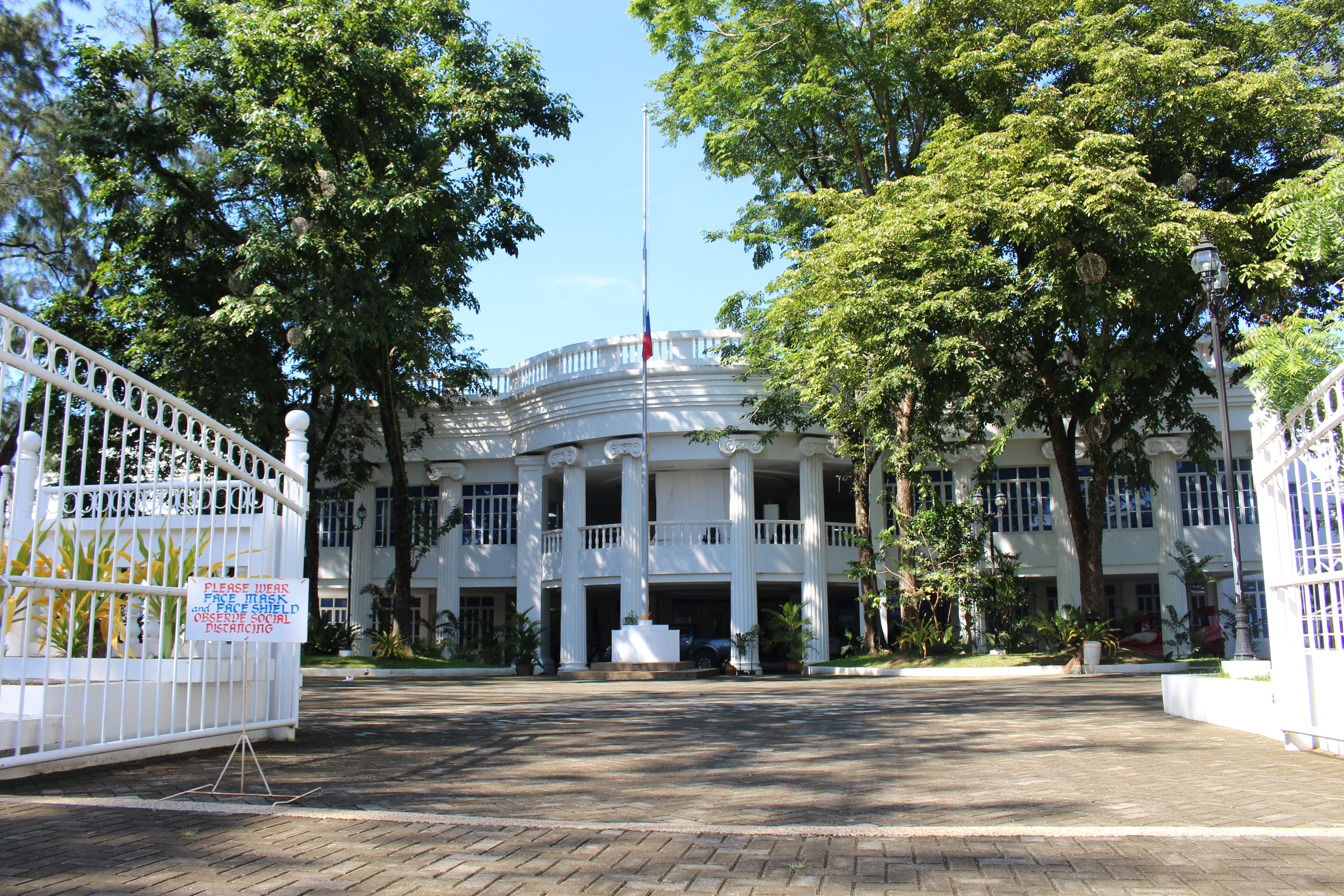
The governor of Zamboanga del Norte holds office at the Zamboanga del Norte Provincial Capitol.

Prior to 1952, present-day Zamboanga del Norte was governed by appointed or elected governors under the historical Moro Province (1903-1914) and Province of Zamboanga (1914-1952).

== List ==
№	Governor	Portrait	Term	Notes	Place of Origin	Ref.
1	Felipe B. Azcuna		1952–1955	Azcuna was governor of Zamboanga (1940–1941; 1948–December 30, 1949) before becoming the first Governor of Zamboanga del Norte.	Katipunan	
2	Guadalupe "Guading" C. Adaza (Guadalupe Carreon Adaza)		1955	Adaza previously served as board member until she was appointed by President Ramon Magsaysay to replace suspended Governor Felipe Azcuna.	Dapitan	
3	Romulo G. Garrovillo (Romulo Garganera Garrovillo)		1955–1959	Garrovillo served as member of the Provincial Board before becoming governor.	San Carlos, Negros Occidental; Dipolog	
(2)	Guadalupe "Guading" C. Adaza (Guadalupe Carreon Adaza)		1959–1963	Adaza was elected vice-governor but was promoted to governor when Governor-elect Alberto Ubay chose to continue his service in the Philippine House of Representatives	Dapitan	
(1)	Felipe B. Azcuna		1963–1967	Re-elected governor for a non-consecutive mandate in 1963.	Katipunan	
4	Virginio B. Lacaya (Virginio Barbaso Lacaya)		1967–1980	Lacaya was a former Mayor of then Municipality of Dipolog before becoming governor. He retired from politics in 1980.	Polanco; Dipolog	
5	Alberto Ubay (Alberto Quilantang Ubay)		1980–1986	Ubay previously served in the Philippine House of Representatives before elected governor.	Merida, Leyte	
6	Isagani "Gani" S. Amatong (Isagani Sybico Amatong)		1986–1995	Amatong was serving as City Councilor of Dipolog since 1984 before being appointed Officer-In-Charge Governor of Zamboanga del Norte after the 1986 People Power Revolution.	Dipolog	
7	Roldan "Brogs" B. Dalman (Roldan Bilog Dalman)		1995–1998	Dalman was a bar topnotcher and served as vice-governor before being elected governor.	Katipunan	
(6)	Isagani "Gani" S. Amatong (Isagani Sybico Amatong)		1998–2004	Amatong was re-elected for a non-consecutive mandate in 1998.	Dipolog	
8	Rolando "Lando" E. Yebes (Rolando Enriquez Yebes)		2004–2013	Yebes was a former Bureau of Customs District Collector before entering politics in 2004.	Dipolog	
9	Roberto "Berto" Y. Uy (Roberto Yu Uy)		2013–2022	Uy served as Mayor of Dipolog (1998–2007) before being elected Provincial Governor. In 2025, he ran again for mayor and won.	Rizal; Dipolog	
10	Rosalina "Nene" G. Jalosjos (Rosalina Garcia Jalosjos)		2022–2025	Jalosjos served as member of the Dapitan City Council (2010-2013), and as Dapitan city mayor (2013-2022) prior to the governorship.	Dapitan	
11	Darel Dexter T. Uy (Darel Dexter Tang Uy)		2025-Present	Uy served as Mayor of Dipolog (2016-2025) prior to the governorship.	Dipolog	

== See also ==
- 2019 Zamboanga del Norte local elections
