= Bullet Jalosjos =

Filipino politician (born 1979)

The Honourable Bullet Jalosjos
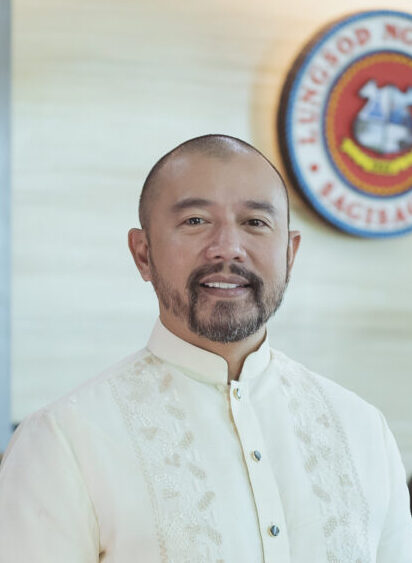
- Official portrait, 2022

11th Mayor of Dapitan
- In office June 30, 2022 – June 30, 2025
- Vice Mayor: Alfredo Sy
- Preceded by: Rosalina Jalosjos
- Succeeded by: Evelyn T. Uy

Member of the House of Representatives from Zamboanga del Norte's 1st district
- In office June 30, 2010 – June 30, 2019
- Preceded by: Cecilia G. Jalosjos-Carreon
- Succeeded by: Romeo Jalosjos Jr.

Member of the Zamboanga del Norte Provincial Board from the 1st district
- In office June 30, 2007 – June 30, 2010

Personal details
- Born: Seth Frederick Pal Jalosjos; September 11, 1979 (age 47)
- Party: PFP (2024–present); APP (local party; 2009–present)
- Other political affiliations: Nacionalista (2012–2024); Lakas (2008–2012); KAMPI (2007–2008)
- Relations: Lana Jalosjos (sister)
- Parent(s): Romeo Jalosjos Sr. Lourna Pal
- Occupation: Businessman; Politician
- Nickname: Bullet

Seth Frederick Pal Jalosjos (born September 11, 1979), known as Bullet Jalosjos, is a Filipino businessman and politician from the province of Zamboanga del Norte, who served as 11th mayor of Dapitan from 2022 to 2025.

== Family and personal life ==
He is the son of former First District Congressman Romeo G. Jalosjos, the half-brother of Congressman Romeo "Jonjon" Jalosjos Jr., the brother of TV host (and former mayor of Baliangao, Misamis Occidental) Svetlana "Lana" Jalosjos-de Leon, and a nephew of Rosalina Jalosjos.

Outside of political life, he is a drummer, a sports enthusiast, a farmer, and a businessman. He was once romantically linked to former actress and model Nancy Castiglione and also has a longtime friendship with fellow Nacionalista Party politicians and an executives of AMBS' All TV Mark Villar.

== Business career ==
Apart from other business ventures within his family, Jalosjos also serves as Chief Financial Officer of Television and Production Exponents (TAPE) Inc., the former producer of the longest-running noontime variety show Eat Bulaga!, and its successor, Tahanang Pinakamasaya.

== Politics ==
Since belonging to a local political family, he made his political entry when he ran for Board Member of Zamboanga del Norte's First District in 2007. In 2010, he ran for and won as Congressman of the same district. He ran for reelection in 2013 and 2016, and won. In the 2019 local elections, he ran for governor of Zamboanga del Norte, but was defeated.

In the 2022 local elections, Jalosjos won as Mayor of Dapitan against former Dipolog Mayor and former Zamboanga Del Norte Governor Roberto Uy.

In the 2025 local elections, Jalosjos ran again for governor of Zamboanga del Norte, but was defeated by Darel Dexter T. Uy.

== Incidents and controversies ==
=== Incidents ===
On April 26, 2016, Jalosjos and his party mates were having a campaign in Barangay Poblacion, La Libertad, Zamboanga del Norte when gunshots were fired. Jalosjos, who was on his reelection bid that year, survived the assassination attempt with his party.

=== 2019 illegal detention case ===
Jalosjos and his cousin were accused of kidnapping and illegal detention of Milagros Ceriales and Rosita Jalosjos in 2019 after it was alleged that the victims were detained against their will at Dakak Park and Beach Resort, which is owned by the Jalosjos family. He was issued an arrest warrant on that matter, but his camp filed for a motion asking for "immediate deferment or recall of the warrant".

== Electoral history ==
=== 2025 ===
2025 Zamboanga del Norte gubernatorial election
Party	Candidate	Votes	%
Lakas	Darel Dexter Uy	366,165	61.22%
PFP	Seth Frederick "Bullet" Jalosjos	226,863	37.93%
Independent	Javier Obnimaga	5,094	0.85%
Total votes		598,122	100.00%
Lakas gain from PFP			

=== 2022 ===
2022 Dapitan mayoralty election
Party	Candidate	Votes	%
Nacionalista	Seth Frederick "Bullet" Jalosjos	18,718	
PDP–Laban	Roberto "Berto Semento" Uy	16,118	
Total votes			

=== 2019 ===
2019 Zamboanga del Norte gubernatorial election
Party	Candidate	Votes	%
PDP–Laban	Roberto "Berto" Uy (incumbent)	219,412	46.91%
Nacionalista	Seth Frederick "Bullet" Jalosjos	216,517	46.29%
Independent	Roberto "Berto" Escobido Uy	23,231	4.97%
PFP	Artemio "Tim" Adaza	4,050	0.87%
Independent	Eduardo "Ed" Sumalpong	1,996	0.43%
WPP	Nestor Dapar	1,301	0.28%
Independent	Eufracio "Dodoy" Bala, Sr.	1,190	0.25%
Total votes		467,697	100%

=== 2010 ===
2010 Philippine House of Representatives election at Zamboanga del Norte's 1st district
Party	Candidate	Votes	%
Lakas–Kampi	Seth Frederick "Bullet" Jalosjos	74,946	81.12
Liberal	Lex Adasa	17,444	18.88
Valid ballots		92,320	89.07
Invalid or blank votes		11,334	10.93
Total votes		103,724	100.00
Lakas–Kampi hold			

Political offices
House of Representatives of the Philippines
Preceded by Cecilia G. Jalosjos-Carreon	Representative, 1st District of Zamboanga del Norte; 2010-2019	Succeeded by Romeo M. Jalosjos, Jr.
