= 2019 Zamboanga del Norte local elections =

Part of the 2019 Philippine general election

2019 Zamboanga del Norte gubernatorial election
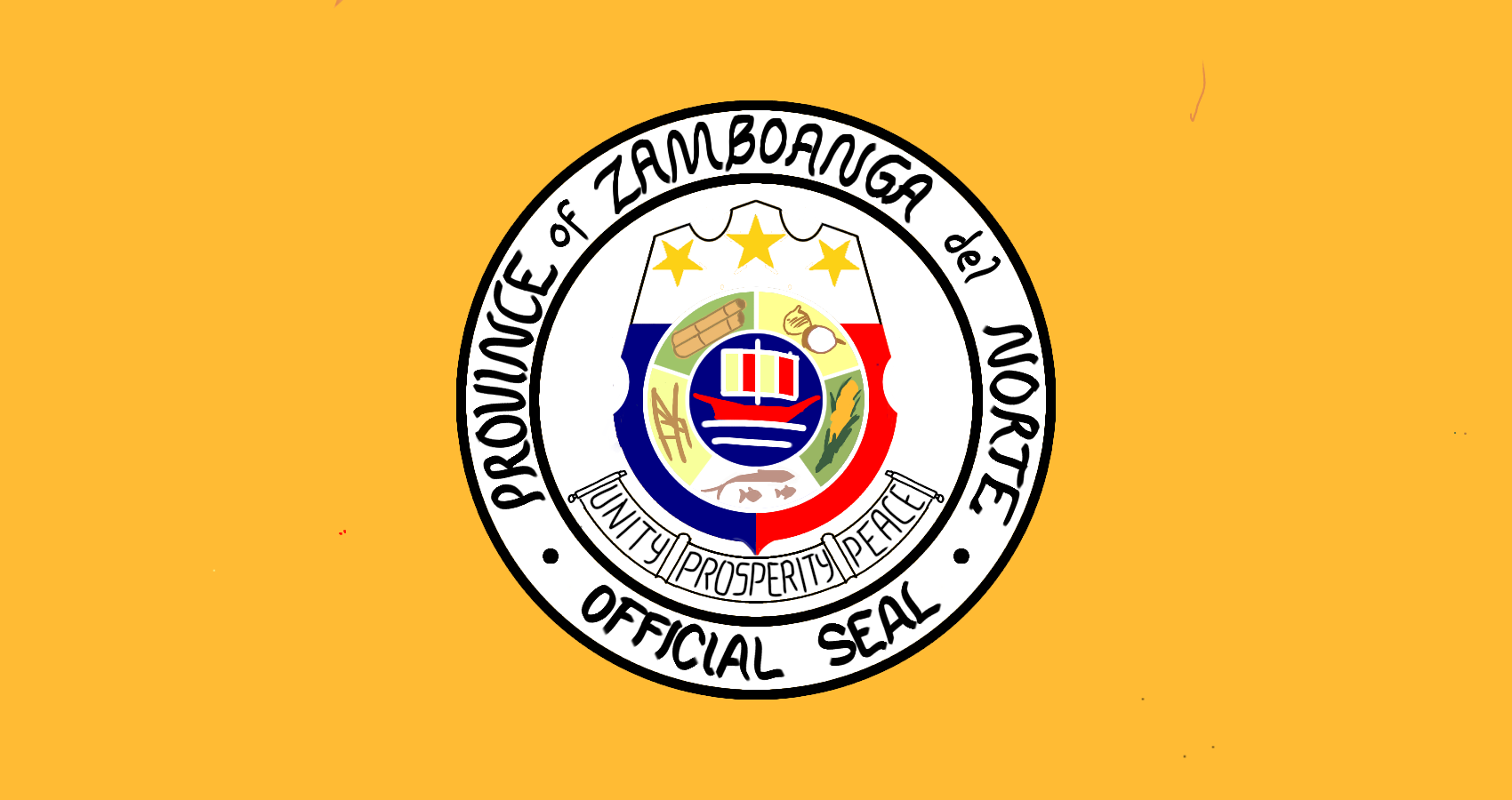
- May 13, 2019
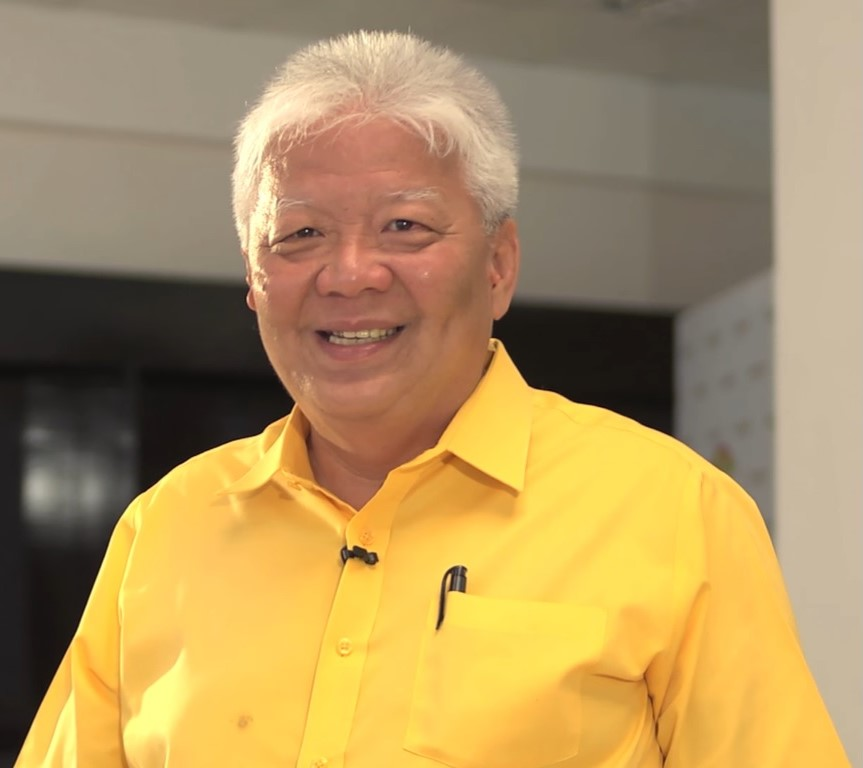

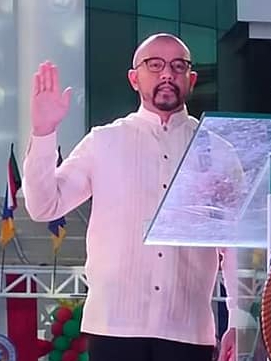
Nominee	Roberto Uy	Bullet Jalosjos
Party	PDP–Laban	Nacionalista
Running mate	Senen Angeles	Britz Hamoy
Popular vote	219,412	216,517
Percentage	46.91%	46.29%
Governor before election
Roberto Uy
Liberal
Elected Governor
Roberto Uy
PDP–Laban

Local elections were held in the province of Zamboanga del Norte of the Philippines, on May 13, 2019 as part of the 2019 general election. Voters selected candidates for all local positions: a municipal and city mayor, vice mayor and councilors, as well as members of the Sangguniang Panlalawigan, the governor, vice governor and representatives for the three districts of Zamboanga del Norte.

== Provincial elections ==
All incumbents are expressed in italics.

=== Governor ===
Incumbent Governor Berto Uy is running for re-election. A candidate for governor by the name of Roberto Escobido Uy participated and entered in the race. On April 4, 2019, the Commission on Elections issued a resolution making Escobido Uy as a nuisance candidate because it bears the same name and same nickname "Berto" in order to confuse the voters. On November 26, 2020, the Supreme Court of the Philippines upheld COMELEC's decision on disqualifying Escobido Uy.

Zamboanga del Norte gubernatorial election
Party	Candidate	Votes	%
PDP–Laban	Roberto "Berto" Uy	219,412	46.91%
Nacionalista	Seth Frederick "Bullet" Jalosjos	216,517	46.29%
Independent	Roberto "Berto" Escobido Uy	23,231	4.97%
PFP	Artemio "Tim" Adaza	4,050	0.87%
Independent	Eduardo "Ed" Sumalpong	1,996	0.43%
WPP	Nestor Dapar	1,301	0.28%
Independent	Eufracio "Dodoy" Bala, Sr.	1,190	0.25%
Total votes		467,697	100%
PDP–Laban hold			

=== Vice governor ===
Incumbent Vice-Governor Senen Angeles is running for re-election.

Zamboanga del Norte vice-gubernatorial election
Party	Candidate	Votes	%
PDP–Laban	Senen Angeles	229,661	56.13
Nacionalista	Peter Dominic "Britz" Adaza Hamoy	163,439	39.94
PFP	Rey "Doc" Acis	8,163	1.99
Independent	Emmanuel "Jun" Cabigon I	7,919	1.94
Total votes		409,182	100
PDP–Laban hold			

== Congressional elections ==
=== 1st District ===
Incumbent Representative Bullet Jalosjos is term-limited and ineligible for re-election; his party nominated Romeo Jalosjos Jr. for the position. His opponent is Pinpin Uy, son of incumbent governor Berto Uy and former mayor of Polanco, Zamboanga del Norte.

2019 Philippine House of Representatives election in the First District of Zamboanga del Norte
Party	Candidate	Votes	%
Nacionalista	Romeo "Jonjon" Jalosjos, Jr.	64,282	
PDP–Laban	Roberto "Pinpin" Uy, Jr.	57,937	
Total votes			
Nacionalista hold			

=== 2nd District ===
Incumbent Representative Glona Labadlabad is running for re-election.

2019 Philippine House of Representatives election in the Second District of Zamboanga del Norte
Party	Candidate	Votes	%
PDP–Laban	Glona Labadlabad	105,319	
Nacionalista	Flora Villarosa	88,638	
Total votes			
PDP–Laban hold			

=== 3rd District ===
Incumbent Representative Gani Amatong is running for re-election.

2019 Philippine House of Representatives election in the Third District of Zamboanga del Norte
Party	Candidate	Votes	%
Liberal	Isagani "Gani" Amatong	91,319	
Nacionalista	Norbideiri "Bong" Edding	68,418	
Total votes			
Liberal hold			

== Provincial board elections ==
Party	Votes	%	Seats
Partido Demokratiko Pilipino-Lakas ng Bayan	726,235	56.40	7
Nacionalista Party	351,156	27.27	2
Nationalist People's Coalition	137,745	10.70	1
Aggrupation of Parties for Progress	39,008	3.03	0
Partido Federal ng Pilipinas	20,367	1.58	0
Independent	13,064	1.01	0
Ex officio seats			3
Total	1,287,575	100.00	13

=== 1st District ===
- City: Dapitan
- Municipalities: La Libertad, Mutia, Piñan, Polanco, Rizal, Sergio Osmeña Sr., Sibutad

Incumbent Board Member Anabel "Bebing" Jalosjos is eligible for re-election but opted to run for mayor of Sibutad.

2019 Provincial Board Election in 1st District of Zamboanga del Norte
Party	Candidate	Votes	%
Nacionalista	Patri "Jing" Chan	56,180	
NPC	Anacleto "Boy" Olvis, Jr.	47,830	
PDP–Laban	Dante Bagarinao (Note: He is a substitute candidate for candidate Edgar "Nonoy" Hibaya.)	46,516	
PDP–Laban	Joven "Ben" Zamora	39,059	
Independent	Ermedio "Edd Meds" Dangcalan	1,624	
Independent	Nenito "Nitoy" Paluray	1,191	
Total votes		192,400	

=== 2nd District ===
- City: Dipolog
- Municipalities: Jose Dalman, Katipunan, Manukan, President Manuel A. Roxas, Siayan, Sindangan

2019 Provincial Board Election in 2nd District of Zamboanga del Norte
Party	Candidate	Votes	%
PDP–Laban	Julius Napigquit	87,443	
PDP–Laban	Crisologo "Logoy" Decierdo	84,248	
PDP–Laban	Romulo "Muling" Soliva	83,866	
PDP–Laban	Ronillo "Boy" Lee	80,775	
Nacionalista	Roseller "Matoy" Barinaga (Note: Prior to his entry into the race, there were two Nacionalista candidates who were initially registered with COMELEC as candidates, Jose Moreno "Boboy" Narvaez and Maximo Velasco Jr. Either of those candidates withdrew their candidacy and either gave way for former NAPC Undersecretary Barinaga.)	71,145	
Nacionalista	Celestine "Nick" Carbonel	61,349	
Nacionalista	Roberto "Bert" Pinsoy	60,486	
NPC	Mary Jane "Jane" Leopoldo	48,076	
PFP	Eduardo "Ed" Yebes	20,367	
Total votes		597,755	100

=== 3rd District ===
- Municipalities: Bacungan, Baliguian, Godod, Gutalac, Kalawit, Labason, Liloy, Salug, Sibuco, Siocon, Sirawai, Tampilisan

Incumbent Board Member Angel Carloto is eligible for re-election but opted not to participate. Conkee Buctuan is his party's nominee.

2019 Provincial Board Election in 3rd District of Zamboanga del Norte
Party	Candidate	Votes	%
PDP–Laban	Venus Uy	88,265	
PDP–Laban	Luzviminda "Bebe" Torrino	79,992	
PDP–Laban	Ruth Brillantes	78,870	
Nacionalista	Constantino "Boy" Soriano, Jr.	62,129	
PDP–Laban	Franco Angelo "Conkee" Buctuan	57,201	
NPC	Kislin Joy Comonsad	41,839	
Nacionalista	Jeffrey Lim	39,867	
APP	Ireneo "Jun" Balucan	39,008	
Independent	Ednu-Sajar "Jar" Hambali	10,249	
Total votes			

== City and municipal elections ==
=== 1st District ===
==== Dapitan ====
Incumbent Mayor Rosalina "Nene" Jalosjos-Johnson is running for re-election, and incumbent Vice Mayor Ruben Cad opted not to participate. Incumbent Councilor Jimboy Chan is the party's nominee for Vice Mayor. Jalosjos's opponent is former Mayor of Dipolog Evelyn Uy. Uy's candidacy was questioned over her residency and the Dapitan election registration board disqualified her, but the Regional Trial Court in Dipolog upheld her candidacy and ruled that she should be included in the list of candidates.

Dapitan mayoralty election
Party	Candidate	Votes	%
APP	Rosalina "Nene" Jalosjos-Johnson	26,407	56.17%
PDP–Laban	Evelyn "Belen" Uy	20,602	43.83%
Total votes		47,009	100%

Dapitan vice mayoralty election
Party	Candidate	Votes	%
Nacionalista	Jimmy Patrick Israel "Jimboy" Chan	26,471	59.64%
PDP–Laban	Jeneth "Inday" Napigquit-Baje	17,915	40.36%
Total votes		44,386	100%

Dapitan City Council clection
Party	Candidate	Votes	%
APP	Dug Christopher "Popoy" Mah	23,556	
Nacionalista	Javert Greg "Bembem" Hamoy	23,338	
APP	Amalou "Ams" Tumapon-Monroyo	23,058	
Nacionalista	Angelica Jalosjos Carreon	22,753	
APP	Adora Recamara	21,965	
APP	Alexander "Bong" Estacio	21,720	
Nacionalista	Gabriel Cad	21,595	
Nacionalista	Ronie "Pareng Hope" Jarapan	21,513	
Nacionalista	Divine Patilano	19,827	
PDP–Laban	Jezebel "Bing" Balisado (Note: She is a substitute candidate for Lilian Asuncion Dalman.)	18,927	
PDP–Laban	Tom Sagario	18,015	
PDP–Laban	Sean "Dodoy" Acaylar (Note: He is a substitute candidate for Andrew "Andy" Castillo.)	17,824	
PDP–Laban	December Gay "Embic" Carreon	17,239	
APP	Clemencio Mercado	17,015	
PDP–Laban	Eleuterio "Jun" Galleposo	16,198	
PDP–Laban	Alroe Cardino (Note: He is a substitute candidate for Mery Cris "Mayet" Cardino.)	16,171	
PDP–Laban	Valentino Suarez	15,510	
PDP–Laban	Dennis Tan	14,765	
PDP–Laban	Ruel Nadela	14,574	
PDP–Laban	Lenie Atis	13,921	
Independent	Julet "Jet" Jalosjos	9,571	
Total votes		389,055	

==== La Libertad ====
La Libertad Mayoralty Election
Party	Candidate	Votes	%
PDP–Laban	Romeo Mejias	3,247	
APP	Nido Aldojesa	1,330	
Total votes			

La Libertad Vice Mayoralty Election
Party	Candidate	Votes	%
PDP–Laban	Alvin Zamora	2,707	
Nacionalista	Julie Ramo	1,505	
Total votes			

==== Mutia ====
Incumbent Mayor Arthur Tenorio is term-limited, and opted to run for Vice Mayor. His wife, incumbent Councilor Melba Tenorio, was fielded as their Mayoral candidate.

Mutia Mayoralty Election
Party	Candidate	Votes	%
PDP–Laban	Lorrymir Adasa (Note: He is a substitute candidate for Bernadette Adasa.)	3,492	
APP	Melba Tenorio	3,265	
Total votes			
PDP–Laban gain from APP			

Mutia Vice Mayoralty Election
Party	Candidate	Votes	%
Nacionalista	Arthur Tenorio (Note: He is a substitute candidate for Miguel Gudmalin.)	3,418	
PDP–Laban	Jenito Bohol	3,251	
Total votes			

==== Piñan ====
Incumbent Vice Mayor Louida Belangoy opted to run for mayor. Her party fielded incumbent Councilor Deogracias "Junjun" Cimafranca for Vice Mayor.

Piñan Mayoralty Election
Party	Candidate	Votes	%
APP	Cecilia "Cely" Jalosjos-Carreon	5,820	
PDP–Laban	Louida "Loids" Belangoy	5,114	
Total votes			

Piñan Vice Mayoralty Election
Party	Candidate	Votes	%
PDP–Laban	Deogracias "Junjun" Cimafranca	5,445	
Nacionalista	Ricardo "Carding" Sabandal	4,918	
Total votes			

==== Polanco ====
Incumbent Sangguniang Bayan members Patty Triambulo and Dario Mandantes, who were both eligible for re-election, opted to run for Municipal Mayor and Vice Mayor respectively.

Polanco Mayoralty Election
Party	Candidate	Votes	%
APP	Evan Hope "Boyet" Olvis	13,139	
PDP–Laban	Pamela "Patty" Triambulo	7,649	
PFP	Wenifredo Jimenez	108	
Total votes			

Polanco Vice Mayoralty Election
Party	Candidate	Votes	%
Nacionalista	Alfredo "Fred" Bait-it	10,710	
PDP–Laban	Dario Mandantes	8,900	
Total votes			

==== Rizal ====
Rizal Mayoralty Election
Party	Candidate	Votes	%
APP	Fiona Marie Manigsaca	6,111	
PDP–Laban	Corazon Bermudo	2,794	
Total votes			

Rizal Vice Mayoralty Election
Party	Candidate	Votes	%
Nacionalista	Roseller "Riel" Manigsaca	5,083	
PDP–Laban	Jose Salac	3,685	
Total votes			

==== Sergio Osmeña Sr. ====
Sergio Osmeña Sr. Mayoralty Election
Party	Candidate	Votes	%
APP	Augustines Magsalay	10,204	
PDP–Laban	Fortunato "Jun-jun" Paundog	5,219	
Total votes			

Sergio Osmeña Sr. Vice Mayoralty Election
Party	Candidate	Votes	%
PDP–Laban	Ariel Bendijo	8,262	
Nacionalista	Roger Chua	6,106	
Total votes			

==== Sibutad ====
Sibutad Mayoralty Election
Party	Candidate	Votes	%
PDP–Laban	Eufracio Caidic	5,335	
APP	Anabel "Bebing" Jalosjos-Garcia	4,608	
Total votes			

Sibutad Vice Mayoralty Election
Party	Candidate	Votes	%
PDP–Laban	Genaro "Naring" Obnimaga	5,180	
Nacionalista	Roger Dizon	4,107	
Total votes			

=== 2nd District ===
==== Dipolog ====
Incumbent Mayor Darel Dexter Uy is running for re-election. His opponents were former Provincial Governor Lando Yebes, and perennial candidate Clyde Naong.

Dipolog mayoralty election
Party	Candidate	Votes	%
PDP–Laban	Darel Dexter Uy	34,060	
Nacionalista	Rolando "Lando" Yebes	27,432	
Independent	Clyde Naong	2,310	
Total votes			

Dipolog vice mayoralty election
Party	Candidate	Votes	%
PDP–Laban	Horacio Velasco	33,432	
Nacionalista	Francis "Bebie" Olvis	25,462	
Total votes			

Dipolog City Council election
Party	Candidate	Votes	%
PDP–Laban	Jasmin Pinsoy	36,420	
PDP–Laban	James Cyril "Toytoy" Ruiz III	35,109	
PDP–Laban	Roger Asprer	33,463	
PDP–Laban	Raul Barbaso	31,910	
PDP–Laban	James Verduguez	31,049	
PDP–Laban	Eduardo "Eddie" Baron	30,039	
PDP–Laban	Peter Co	29,371	
PDP–Laban	Marilou Calibo	29,288	
PDP–Laban	Praxides "Praxy" Rubia (Note: He is a substitute candidate for Trinidad Rubia.)	29,071	
PDP–Laban	Maynard "Bebe" Baes	26,699	
APP	Edionar "Loloy/Mr. Kasayuran" Zamoras	23,912	
APP	Ivan Patrick Ang	21,890	
Nacionalista	Phil Adams "Piloy" Briones	21,121	
APP	Daniel "Dodong" Bagarinao, Jr.	20,264	
Nacionalista	Benjie Maligro	19,990	
Nacionalista	Carlito "Bong" Ortega	18,786	
APP	Paul Clark Gudmalin	18,382	
Nacionalista	Cesar Bala	17,722	
Nacionalista	Alejandro Gunao	16,773	
APP	Jean "Dra. Jean" Sarmiento	15,067	
Nacionalista	Joseph Lester "Joepats" Patay	6,077	
Independent	Danilo "Danny Boy" Torres	1,560	
Independent	Rydell Muscosa	1,244	
Total votes		515,207	100%

==== Jose Dalman (Ponot) ====
Jose Dalman Mayoralty Election
Party	Candidate	Votes	%
PDP–Laban	Rachel "Inday" Ferrater	8,407	
Nacionalista	Russel Adaza	4,063	
APP	Rommel "Nonoy" Felicia	1,428	
Independent	Javier Labadlabad	68	
Total votes			

Jose Dalman Vice Mayoralty Election
Party	Candidate	Votes	%
PDP–Laban	Edwin Dalam	7,919	
Independent	Darwin Asaali	3,052	
Independent	Jose Voltaire "Moyen" Piñero	1,490	
Independent	Felmor "Amor" Beldad	120	
Total votes			

==== Katipunan ====
Katipunan Mayoralty Election
Party	Candidate	Votes	%
APP	Patchito "Patchi" Eguia	13,316	
PDP–Laban	Willie James Wong	7,622	
Total votes			

Katipunan Vice Mayoralty Election
Party	Candidate	Votes	%
Nacionalista	Crisostomo "Cris" Eguia, Jr.	12,952	
PDP–Laban	Teresita "Tessie" Matildo	7,198	
Total votes			

==== Manukan ====
Manukan Mayoralty Election
Party	Candidate	Votes	%
PDP–Laban	Eugene Caballero	13,951	
APP	Manuel "Maning" Urquiaga	1,421	
Independent	Arnold Camillus Fabella	270	
Total votes			

Manukan Vice Mayoralty Election
Party	Candidate	Votes	%
PDP–Laban	Enriquita Winters	11,737	
Nacionalista	Jeffrey "Anjing" Villarin	1,998	
Independent	Reynaldo "Bobong" Mondol	257	
Total votes			

==== President Manuel A. Roxas ====
Incumbent Vice Mayor Leonor Alberto is term-limited and opted to run for Sangguniang Bayan member. Alberto's party fielded incumbent SB member Ismael "Junior" Rengquijo as vice mayoral candidate.

President Manuel A. Roxas Mayoralty Election
Party	Candidate	Votes	%
PDP–Laban	Jan Hendrik Vallecer	10,240	
Nacionalista	Rolando "Jun-jun" Yebes, Jr.	7,405	
Independent	Arlene Villaester	276	
Total votes			

President Manuel A. Roxas Vice Mayoralty Election
Party	Candidate	Votes	%
PDP–Laban	Ismael "Junior" Rengquijo	9,769	
APP	Rumar Legara	6,653	
Independent	Alejandro "Andoy" Moro	227	
Total votes			

==== Siayan ====
Incumbent Mayor Flora Villarosa, who was on her third and final term as mayor, was suspended by the Provincial Board for grave misconduct and abuse of authority because of her murder allegations. Vice Mayor Daisy Limbang was to serve as mayor, but this caused a commotion between Villarosa and Limbang with their respective allies all along. Being ineligible for re-election, Villarosa opted to run for 2nd District Representative, and her party fielded Josecor Gepolongca to run for mayor against Vice Mayor Limbang.

Siayan Mayoralty Election
Party	Candidate	Votes	%
Nacionalista	Josecor Gepolongca	9,568	
PDP–Laban	Daisy Limbang	5,855	
Total votes			
Nacionalista gain from PDP–Laban			

Siayan Vice Mayoralty Election
Party	Candidate	Votes	%
APP	Primitivo "Dondon" Castillo	8,157	
PDP–Laban	Wilfredo "Nonoywas" Siasico	6,193	
Total votes			

==== Sindangan ====
Incumbent Mayor Nilo Florentino "Boy" Sy is term-limited and ineligible for re-election, and run for Vice Mayor; former Representative Dodoy Labadlabad is chosen as the party's nominee. His opponents are former Armed Forces Chief of Staff Gen. Alexander Yano, and Ritche "Bong" Macias.

Sindangan Mayoralty Election
Party	Candidate	Votes	%
PDP–Laban	Rosendo "Dodoy" Labadlabad	27,767	
APP	Alexander Yano	17,413	
NPC	Ritche "Bong" Macias	2,788	
Independent	Lourdes Ranas	98	
Total votes			

Sindangan Vice Mayoralty Election
Party	Candidate	Votes	%
PDP–Laban	Nilo Florentino "Boy" Sy	23,039	
Nacionalista	Aurelio "Tata" Monteclaro	15,899	
NPC	Uldarico "Ricky" Mejorada II	3,273	
Independent	Jocelyn "Joy" Gutual	2,189	
Independent	Orlando Mertalla	383	
Total votes			

=== 3rd District ===
==== Baliguian ====
Baliguian Mayoralty Election
Party	Candidate	Votes	%
PDP–Laban	Albina "Obing" Esmali	5,236	
Nacionalista	Cresencio Suson	5,175	
Total votes			

Baliguian Vice Mayoralty Election
Party	Candidate	Votes	%
PDP–Laban	Gani Esmali	5,425	
APP	Sakili Barang	4,328	
Total votes			

==== Godod ====
Godod Mayoralty Election
Party	Candidate	Votes	%
PDP–Laban	Abel "Toto" Matildo	5,469	
Nacionalista	Rolando Te	3,180	
Total votes			

Godod Vice Mayoralty Election
Party	Candidate	Votes	%
PDP–Laban	Ferdinand "Banoy" Caboverde	5,641	
APP	Urias "Boyet" Mangan	2,613	
Total votes			

==== Gutalac ====
Gutalac Mayoralty Election
Party	Candidate	Votes	%
PDP–Laban	Onesimo "Jun" Coma	10,198	
Nacionalista	Mariano "Nonoy" Candelaria	6,652	
Independent	Bernie Atis	368	
Total votes			

Gutalac Vice Mayoralty Election
Party	Candidate	Votes	%
PDP–Laban	Joel Tendero	9,767	
APP	Herminio Jamandron	4,712	
Independent	Enrique Abria	1,495	
Total votes			

==== Kalawit ====
Kalawit Mayoralty Election
Party	Candidate	Votes	%
PDP–Laban	Salvador "Jun" Antojado	6,684	
Nacionalista	Eugenio Baliling	3,867	
Independent	Crisostomo Garate, Jr.	509	
Total votes			

Kalawit Vice Mayoralty Election
Party	Candidate	Votes	%
PDP–Laban	Merly Masugbo	6,069	
APP	George Lugsanay	4,159	
Total votes			

==== Labason ====
Incumbent Vice Mayor Riza Melicor opted to run for Mayor.

Labason Mayoralty Election
Party	Candidate	Votes	%
PDP–Laban	Eddie "Ed" Quimbo	12,198	
Nacionalista	Riza Melicor	8,768	
Total votes			

Labason Vice Mayoralty Election
Party	Candidate	Votes	%
PDP–Laban	Virgilio "Tony Yap" Go	13,136	
APP	Catherine "Cathy" Balais	6,874	
Total votes			

==== Leon B. Postigo (Bacungan) ====
Leon B. Postigo Mayoralty Election
Party	Candidate	Votes	%
PDP–Laban	Hermogenes "Remie" Cordova	6,784	
APP	William Anadeo	5,672	
Independent	Edgardo Quinto	99	
Total votes			

Leon B. Postigo Vice Mayoralty Election
Party	Candidate	Votes	%
PDP–Laban	Aidaroz "Daroz" Hambali	6,254	
Nacionalista	Loreto "Rito" Absin	5,170	
Independent	Jumrathia "Jum" Aragon	145	
Total votes			

==== Liloy ====
Mayor Felixberto "Dodong" Bolando, who was elected mayor in 2016, died in 2018, and Vice Mayor Roberto "Jun" Uy (no relation to incumbent governor Berto Uy) took Bolando's place as Mayor of Liloy.

Liloy Mayoralty Election
Party	Candidate	Votes	%
PDP–Laban	Roberto "Jun" Uy	14,220	
Nacionalista	Jaime "Shobing" Lim	8,530	
Total votes			

Liloy Vice Mayoralty Election
Party	Candidate	Votes	%
PDP–Laban	John Momar Insong	8,123	
Independent	Feliciano "Fely" Bolando	7,792	
APP	Sabino Gallo Jr.	6,559	
Total votes			
PDP–Laban hold			

==== Salug ====
Incumbent Mayor Jeffrey Lim is term-limited and opted to run for Provincial Board Member. His party fielded Jehan Lim as their mayoralty candidate.

Salug Mayoralty Election
Party	Candidate	Votes	%
PDP–Laban	Melodie Tolin	8,198	
Nacionalista	Jehan Lim	7,981	
Total votes			

Salug Vice Mayoralty Election
Party	Candidate	Votes	%
APP	William "Mabuhay" Maribojoc	9,707	
PDP–Laban	Sergio Bihag	5,606	
Total votes			
PDP–Laban hold			

==== Sibuco ====
Incumbent Mayor Norbideiri "Bong" Edding opted to run for Third District Representative.

Sibuco Mayoralty Election
Party	Candidate	Votes	%
PDP–Laban	Joel Ventura	8,224	
Nacionalista	Nurunniam "Lil" Edding	8,079	
Independent	Norhida Hajal	228	
Total votes			

Sibuco Vice Mayoralty Election
Party	Candidate	Votes	%
Nacionalista	Laurel Mahamod	7,614	
Liberal	Lood Alipon	6,539	
PDP–Laban	Asmad Badlis	1,145	
PDDS	Hairi Diga	196	
Total votes			

==== Siocon ====
Siocon Mayoralty Election
Party	Candidate	Votes	%
PDP–Laban	Julius Lobrigas	9,008	
Nacionalista	Ceasar Soriano	8,778	
Independent	Arola Kiran	2,389	
Independent	Sajid Sappari	64	
Total votes			

Siocon Vice Mayoralty Election
Party	Candidate	Votes	%
APP	Karon Esmali	8,961	
PDP–Laban	Nathaniel Usin	7,253	
Independent	Jefferson Arabi	2,257	
Total votes			

==== Sirawai ====
Sirawai Mayoralty Election
Party	Candidate	Votes	%
PDP–Laban	Gamar Janihim	11,439	
Independent	Romeo Cariño	2,695	
Nacionalista	Atiya Abang	479	
Total votes			

Sirawai Vice Mayoralty Election
Party	Candidate	Votes	%
APP	Pulman "Pahambong" Darquez	8,193	
PDP–Laban	Jaime Felizarta	3,005	
Independent	Mustafa Maing	2,480	
Total votes			

==== Tampilisan ====
Tampilisan Mayoralty Election
Party	Candidate	Votes	%
PDP–Laban	Angeles "Bobong" Carloto II	6,532	
Nacionalista	Alson Chan	5,432	
Total votes			

Tampilisan Vice Mayoralty Election
Party	Candidate	Votes	%
PDP–Laban	Generico "Boboy" Jauculan	6,698	
APP	Rhyan Petrose Albino	4,364	
Total votes			
