= Malang (disambiguation) =

Malang is a city in East Java, Indonesia.

Malang may also refer to:

== Places ==
- Malang Regency, a regency in East Java
- Deh-e Malang, village in Sistan and Baluchestan, Iran
- Malang Plain, Malang, Indonesia
- Malang Shahwala, village in Punjab, India
- Ziarat-e Malang, village in Iran
- Malang State University, Malang, Indonesia
- Malang railway station, Malang, Indonesia
- Malang gad, place in Bombay, India; it's also known as Shree Malang gad

== People ==
- Malang (painter) (1928–2017), Filipino cartoonist, illustrator, and fine arts painter
- Malang Diedhiou (born 1973), Senegalese association football referee
- Sher Malang, Afghan politician
- Malang Sarr (born 1999), French professional footballer

== Entertainment ==
- "Malang" (song), a 2013 Hindi song by Pritam feat. Siddharth Mahadevan and Shilpa Rao
- Malang (film), an Indian Hindi-language romantic thriller film

== Other uses ==
- Malang language (disambiguation)

== See also ==
- Malanga (disambiguation)
