= Zamboanga Sibugay Provincial Board =

Legislative body of the province of Zamboanga Sibugay, Philippines

Zamboanga Sibugay Provincial Board Sangguniang Panlalawigan ng Zamboanga Sibugay

Type
- Type: Unicameral
- Term limits: 3 terms (9 years)

Leadership
- Presiding Officer: Richard D. Olegario, Nacionalista since June 30, 2025

Structure
- Seats: 13 board members 1 ex officio presiding officer
- Political groups: PFP (6) Lakas-CMD (2) Nacionalista (2) Non partisan (2) Akbayan (1)
- Length of term: 3 years
- Authority: Local Government Code of the Philippines

Elections
- Voting system: Multiple non-transferable vote (regular members); Indirect election (ex officio members)
- Last election: May 12, 2025
- Next election: November 1, 2026

Meeting place
- Zamboanga Sibugay Provincial Capitol, Ipil

The Zamboanga Sibugay Provincial Board is the Sangguniang Panlalawigan (provincial legislature) of the Philippine province of Zamboanga Sibugay.

The members are elected via plurality-at-large voting: the province is divided into two districts, each having five seats. A voter votes up to five names, with the top five candidates per district being elected. The vice governor is the ex officio presiding officer, and only votes to break ties. The vice governor is elected via the plurality voting system province-wide.

The districts used in appropriation of members is coextensive with the legislative districts of Zamboanga Sibugay.

Aside from the regular members, the board also includes the provincial federation presidents of the Liga ng mga Barangay (ABC, from its old name "Association of Barangay Captains"), the Sangguniang Kabataan (SK, youth councils) and the Philippine Councilors League (PCL).

== Apportionment ==
Elections	Seats per district		Ex officio seats	Total seats
Elections	1st	2nd	Ex officio seats	Total seats
2010–present	5	5	3	13

== List of members ==
=== Current members ===
These are the members after the 2025 elections

- Vice Governor: Richard D. Olegario (Nacionalista)

Seat	Board member	Party	Start of term	End of term
1st district	Pepito S. Yanga, Jr.	PFP	June 30, 2022	June 30, 2028
1st district	June Vita F. Mendoza	PFP	June 30, 2025	June 30, 2028
1st district	Jonathan C. Yambao	Nacionalista	June 30, 2025	June 30, 2028
1st district	Ralph H. de los Santos	PFP	June 30, 2025	June 30, 2028
1st district	Roger P. Lu	PFP	June 30, 2025	June 30, 2028
2nd district	Glenn C. Sabijon	Nacionalista	June 30, 2025	June 30, 2028
2nd district	George Pavlo S. Hofer	PFP	June 30, 2025	June 30, 2028
2nd district	Eufemio D. Javier, Jr.	Lakas	June 30, 2025	June 30, 2028
2nd district	Eldwin M. Alibutdan	Akbayan	June 30, 2025	June 30, 2028
2nd district	Nath Anthony R. Eudela	Lakas	June 30, 2025	June 30, 2028
ABC	Abdulmukim B. Musa	Nonpartisan	November 30, 2023	November 30, 2026
PCL	Sharif Mazin A. Hasim	PFP	September 9, 2025	June 30, 2028
SK	Hersheymae L. Senarlo	Nonpartisan	November 30, 2023	November 30, 2026

== Past members ==
=== Vice Governors ===
Election year	Name	Party	Ref.
2001	Eugenio L. Famor	LAMMP/NPC	
2004	Eric A. Cabarios	Lakas	
2007	Rey Andre C. Olegario	Lakas	
2010	Rey Andre C. Olegario	Nacionalista	
2013	Rey Andre C. Olegario	Nacionalista	
2016	Eldwin M. Alibutdan	Liberal	
2019	Rey Andre C. Olegario	Nacionalista	
2022	Rey Andre C. Olegario	Nacionalista	
2025	Richard D. Olegario	Nacionalista	

=== 1st district ===
Election year	Member (party)	Member (party)	Member (party)	Member (party)	Member (party)	Ref.
2001	Eric A. Cabarios (Lakas-NUCD-UMDP)	Felizardo V. Cataluña, Jr. (Lakas-NUCD-UMDP)	Olimpio V. Mañalac, Jr. (Lakas-NUCD-UMDP)	George C. Castillo (Lakas-NUCD-UMDP)	Ma. Bella C. Javier (KAMPI)	
2004	Ma. Bella C. Javier (Lakas)	Eldwin M. Alibutdan (PMP)	Richard B. Rambuyong (PMP)	George C. Castillo (Lakas)	Felizardo V. Cataluña, Jr. (Lakas)	
2013	Jonathan C. Yambao (Nacionalista)	Editha O. Calonge (Nacionalista)	Marie Yvonne V. Palma (Liberal)	Lesliejoy V. Jore (Nacionalista)	Abdusahid A. Ahiron (Nacionalista)	
2016	Eric Y. Palma (Liberal)	Editha O. Calonge (Nacionalista)	Allan B. Escamillan (Liberal)	Lesliejoy V. Jore (Nacionalista)	Abdusahid A. Ahiron (Nacionalista)	
2019	Jonathan C. Yambao (Nacionalista)	Marie Yvonne V. Palma (Independent)	Allan B. Escamillan (Independent)	Jessie R. Lagas (Independent)	Cresencio S. Jore (Independent)	
2022	Pepito S. Yanga, Jr. (Lakas)	Allan B. Escamillan (Lakas)	Marie Yvonne V. Palma (Lakas)	Jessie R. Lagas (Lakas)	Marlo Bancoro (LDP)	
2025	Pepito S. Yanga, Jr. (PFP)	June Vita F. Mendoza (PFP)	Jonathan C. Yambao (Nacionalista)	Ralph Hector H. De Los Santos (PFP)	Roger P. Lu (PFP)	

=== 2nd district ===
Election year	Member (party)	Member (party)	Member (party)	Member (party)	Member (party)	Ref.
2001	Ignacio C. Baya (Lakas-NUCD-UMDP)	Cresencio S. Jore (NPC)	Leonardo R. Lagas (NPC)	Edgar C. Gonzales (KAMPI)	Ares A. Modapil (NPC)	
2004	Lycel B. Castor (PMP)	Cresencio S. Jore (Lakas)	Jonathan C. Yambao (Lakas)	Juanito B. Gonzales (PMP)	Lalaine T. Capotulan (Lakas)	
2013	Eric A. Cabarios (Nacionalista)	Eufemio D. Javier, Jr. (Nacionalista)	Mujahid "Jed" C. Jajurie (Nacionalista)	Joel D. Ebol (Nacionalista)	George C. Castillo (Independent)	
2016	Richard D. Olegario (Nacionalista)	Eufemio D. Javier, Jr. (Nacionalista)	Mujahid "Jed" C. Jajurie (Nacionalista)	Ma. Esperanza Corazon R. Rillera (Nacionalista)	George C. Castillo (Independent)	
2019	Richard D. Olegario (Nacionalista)	Mujahid "Jed" C. Jajurie (Nacionalista)	Bella Javier (APP)	Ma. Esperanza Corazon R. Rillera (APP)	George C. Castillo (APP)	
2022	Richard D. Olegario (Nacionalista)	Jet M. Acosta (Nacionalista)	Bella Javier (Lakas)	Ma. Esperanza Corazon R. Rillera (Lakas)	Chennie B. Delos Reyes (Nacionalista)	
2025	Glenn C. Sabijon (Nacionalista)	George Pavlo S. Hofer (PFP)	Eufemio D. Javier, Jr. (Lakas)	Eldwin M. Alibutdan (Akbayan)	Nath Anthony R. Eudela (Lakas)	

=== Liga ng mga Barangay President ===
These members represent a group of elected Barangay captains from the 16 ABC councils of Zamboanga Sibugay.

Election year	Member	Municipality/City	Ref.
2013	Jerry R. Lagas	Buug	
2018	Jerry R. Lagas	Buug	
2023	Abdulmukim B. Musa	Alicia	
