= Malanga =

Malanga may refer to:

== Biology ==
=== Botany ===
- Xanthosoma, a tropical and sub-tropical edible or ornamental plant, or its starchy bulbotubers
- Eddoe (Colocasia esculenta antiquorum), a tropical vegetable closely related to taro

=== Zoology ===
- Erebus ephesperis, also known as Erebus malanga, a moth species
- Eilema triplaiola, also known as Ilema malanga, a moth species

== Film ==
- Malanga (film), 1986 Pakistani film

== Music ==
- Malanga (Colombian band), Colombian rock band
- Malanga (Venezuelan band), Venezuelan pop rock or Venezuelan rock band

== People ==
- Malanga (dancer) (1885–1927), Cuban rumba dancer born José Rosario Oviedo
- Christian Malanga (1983–2024), Congolese politician
- Gerard Malanga (born 1943), American poet and filmmaker
- Steven Malanga, American journalist

== Places ==
- Malanga, neighbourhood in Maputo, Mozambique
- Malanga, ancient name of Kanchipuram, India
- Char Malanga, village in Bangladesh
- Malangas, Zamboanga Sibugay, a town in the Philippines
- Malangas Coal Reservation

== See also ==
- Malagan, ceremony in Papua New Guinea
- Malang (disambiguation)
