= 2022 Zamboanga del Norte local elections =

Part of the 2022 Philippine general election

2022 Zamboanga del Norte gubernatorial election
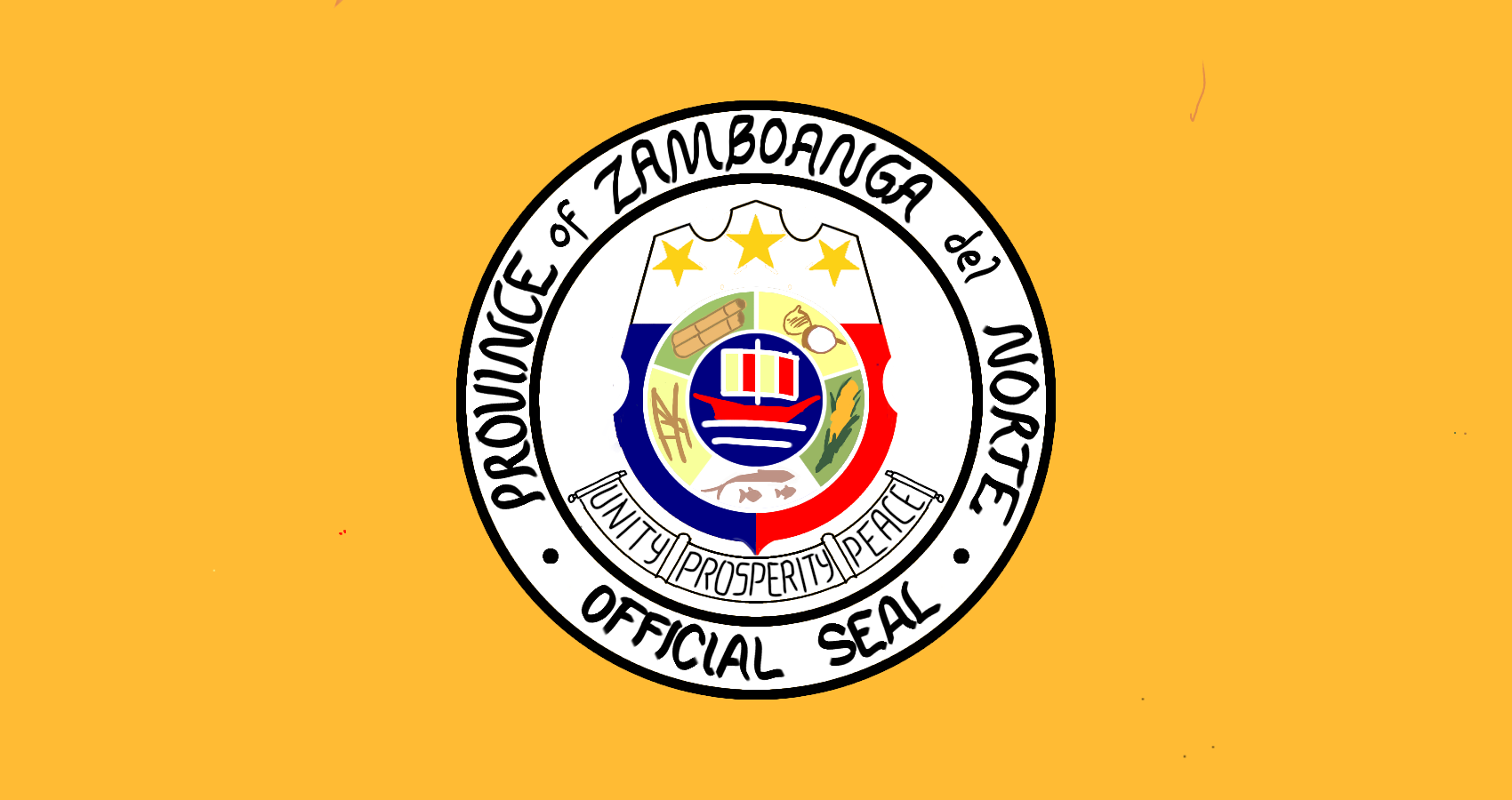
- May 9, 2022
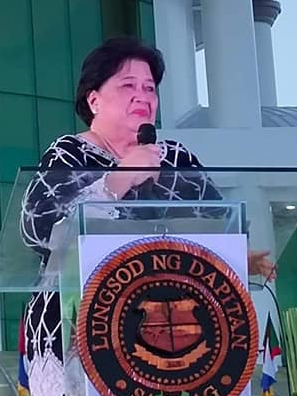
		PDPLBN
Nominee	Rosalina Jalosjos	Evelyn Uy
Party	Nacionalista	PDP–Laban
Running mate	Lando Yebes	Julius Napigquit
Popular vote	249,956	237,530
Percentage	50.27	47.78
Governor before election
Roberto Uy
PDP–Laban
Elected Governor
Rosalina Jalosjos
Nacionalista

Local elections were held in the province of Zamboanga del Norte of the Philippines, on May 9, 2022 as part of the 2022 general election. Voters will select candidates for all local positions: a municipal and city mayor, vice mayor and councilors, as well as members of the Sangguniang Panlalawigan, the governor, vice governor and representatives for the three districts of Zamboanga del Norte.

== Background ==
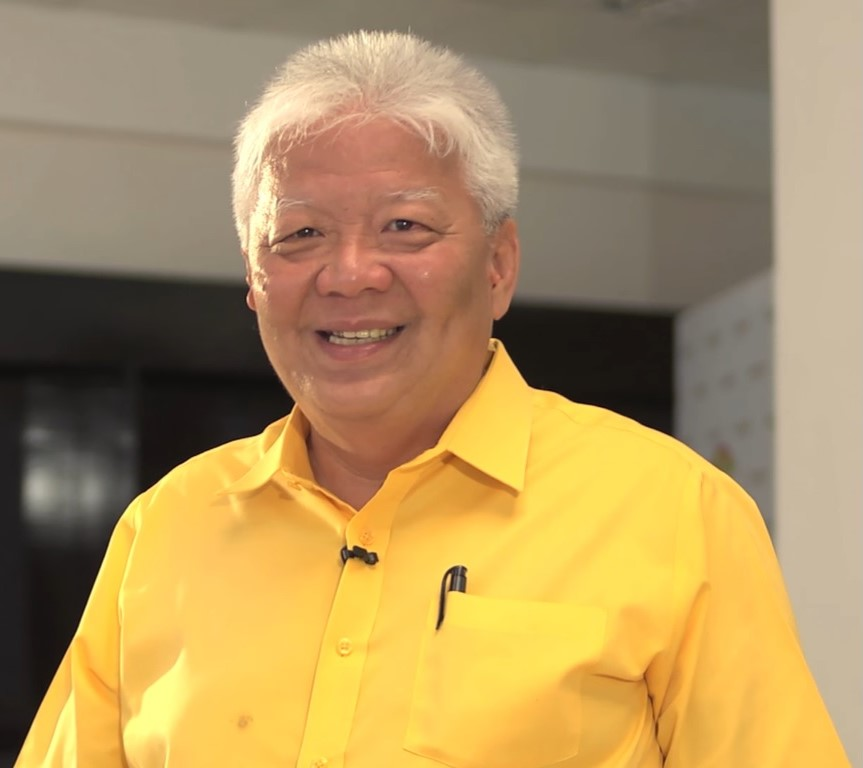
Incumbent governor Berto Uy, first elected in 2013, is term limited.

Incumbent governor Roberto Uy is term-limited, and is prohibited from running for a fourth consecutive term. Uy opted to run for city mayor of Dapitan, and his party nominated Evelyn Uy for the position. Evelyn Uy's opponent is Rosalina "Nene" Jalosjos, incumbent and last-termer city mayor of Dapitan, whom she dueled in the 2019 mayoralty.

== Opinion polling ==
Gubernatorial elections
Fieldwork date(s)	Pollster	Sample size	MoE	Cabigon Ind.	Diputado Ind.	Jalosjos NP	Nueva PPM	Sumalpong Ind.	Uy PDPLBN	Others	Und./ Ref.	None
Jan 22-30	RP-MDF	1,200	±3.0%	—	—	80	-	—	57	—	25	—
Apr 1–5	RP-MDF	1,200	±3.0%	—	—	85	-	—	68	—	75	—

Mayoralty elections - Dapitan
Fieldwork date(s)	Pollster	Sample size	MoE	Jalosjos NP	Uy PDPLBN	Others	Und./ Ref.	None
Apr 1–5	RP-MDF	1,200	±3.0%	44	54	—	2	—

Mayoralty elections - Dipolog
Fieldwork date(s)	Pollster	Sample size	MoE	Eddai Ind.	Jalosjos NP	Naong Ind.	Uy PDPLBN	Others	Und./ Ref.	None
Jan 22-30	RP-MDF	1,200	±3.0%	-	17	-	73	—	10	—
Apr 1–5	RP-MDF	1,200	±3.0%	-	20	7	70	—	3	—

== Provincial elections ==
=== Governor ===
Zamboanga del Norte gubernatorial election
Party	Candidate	Votes	%
Nacionalista	Rosalina "Nene" Jalosjos	249,956	50.27
PDP–Laban	Evelyn "Belen" Uy	237,530	47.78
Independent	Eduardo "Eddie" Sumalpong	3,206	0.64
Independent	Emmanuel "Jun" Cabigon I	2,755	0.55
PPM	Emmanuel "Bong" Nueva	2,356	0.47
Independent	Reynaldo Diputado	1,377	0.28
Total votes		497,180	100.00

=== Vice governor ===
Incumbent vice governor Senen Angeles is term-limited, and is prohibited from running for a fourth consecutive term. Angeles opted to run for city vice mayor of Dipolog, and his party nominated incumbent 2nd District board member Julius Napigquit for the position.

Zamboanga del Norte vice gubernatorial election
Party	Candidate	Votes	%
PDP–Laban	Julius Napigquit	232,754	50.10
Nacionalista	Rolando "Lando" Yebes	221,267	47.63
PPM	Michael Lumantao	5,547	1.19
Independent	Eufracio "Dodoy" Bala, Sr.	5,025	1.08
Total votes		464,593	100.00

=== Provincial board ===
Party	Votes	%	Seats
Partido Demokratiko Pilipino-Lakas ng Bayan	813,442	62.25	9
Nacionalista Party	420,636	32.19	1
Aggrupation of Parties for Prosperity	61,310	4.69	–
Partido Pederal ng Maharlika	7,719	0.59	–
Independent	3,551	0.27	–
Ex officio seats			3
Total	1,306,658	100.00	13

==== 1st District ====
Incumbent Anacleto "Boy" Olvis Jr. did not run for reelection, while incumbent Patri "Jing" Chan is running for reelection for a third mandate. Vying for a seat for the district include incumbent Dapitan councilor Angelica Jalosjos Carreon, former board member Jose Joy Olvis, and Dapitan-based lawyer Pete Zamora.

2022 Provincial Board Election in 1st District in Zamboanga del Norte
Party	Candidate	Votes	%
Nacionalista	Angelica Jalosjos Carreon	67,947	11.60
PDP–Laban	Patri "Jing" Chan (incumbent)	60,873	10.39
PDP–Laban	Pete "Atty. Pete" Zamora	56,035	9.57
Nacionalista	Jose Joy Olvis	55,552	9.48
Total votes		240,407	100.00

==== 2nd District ====
Incumbents Julius Napigquit, Crisologo "Logoy" Decierdo, Romulo "Muling" Soliva, and Ronillo "Boy" Lee are all ineligible for reelection. Napigquit opted to run for vice governor, while Soliva opted to run for city councilor of Dipolog. Vying for a seat for the district are term-limited Dipolog councilors Peter Co and Jasmin Pinsoy-Lagutin, former city councilor Dante Bagarinao, former Roxas municipal mayor Ed Yebes, and radio broadcasters Raymond Acopiado and Nick Carbonel. Bagarinao, who ran for board member in the 1st district in the 2019 local elections, is making his run for the position in this district.

2022 Provincial Board Election in 2nd District in Zamboanga del Norte
Party	Candidate	Votes	%
PDP–Laban	Jasmin Pinsoy-Lagutin	101,105	17.26
PDP–Laban	Peter Co	99,748	17.03
PDP–Laban	Dante Bagarinao (Note: He is a substitute candidate for Rosebeth Turno.)	92,303	15.76
PDP–Laban	Michael "Jojo" Documento Jr.	81,099	13.85
Nacionalista	Eduardo "Ed" Yebes	61,798	10.55
APP	Celestine "Nick" Carbonel	61,310	10.47
Nacionalista	Vincent Raymond Acopiado	31,682	5.41
Nacionalista	Alejandro "Alex" Gunao	29,516	5.04
PPM	Joyrey "Jojo" Porlas	4,386	0.75
Independent	Noel Bandala	3,551	0.61
Total votes		566,498	100.00

==== 3rd District ====
Incumbents Venus Uy, Luzviminda "Bebe" Torrino, and Ruth Brillantes are ineligible for reelection, but incumbent Constantino "Boy" Soriano Jr. is running for reelection. Venus Uy opted to run for Sangguniang Bayan member of Liloy. Vying for seats for the district include incumbent Liloy Sangguniang Bayan members Kay Marie Bolando and Leo Nicanor Mejorada, and former Dapitan administrator Wilberth "Jojo" Magallanes. Conkee Buctuan, who previously made a run for this position in 2019, is making his second attempt for the position.

2022 Provincial Board Election in 3rd District in Zamboanga del Norte
Party	Candidate	Votes	%
PDP–Laban	Kay Marie Bolando	86,956	14.85
PDP–Laban	Leo Nicanor "Atty. Leo" Mejorada	83,957	14.33
PDP–Laban	Franco Angelo "Conkee" Buctuan	80,081	13.67
PDP–Laban	Jeff Raymund "JR" Brillantes	71,285	12.17
Nacionalista	Constantino "Boy" Soriano Jr. (incumbent)	57,802	9.87
Nacionalista	Wilberth "Jojo" Magallanes	49,404	8.43
Nacionalista	Shane "Cocoy" Galon	40,438	6.90
Nacionalista	Cerelino "Jerry" Mercado	26,497	4.52
PPM	Argie Antigo	3,333	0.57
Total votes		499,753	100.00

== Congressional elections ==
Incumbents Romeo Jalosjos Jr. of the 1st district and Glona Labadlabad of the 2nd district are running for reelection; fellow incumbent Isagani Amatong of the 3rd district, an ally of the Uys, is term-limited and ineligible for re-election. Amatong's party, the Liberal Party, nominated Ian Amatong for the position. Challenging the younger Amatong is former 3rd district representative Cesar Jalosjos.

=== 1st District ===
2022 Philippine House of Representatives election in the First District of Zamboanga del Norte
Party	Candidate	Votes	%
PDP–Laban	Roberto "Pinpin" Uy Jr.	69,591	
Nacionalista	Romeo "Jonjon" Jalosjos Jr. (incumbent)	69,109	
NUP	Federico "Kuya Jan" Jalosjos (Note: He is a substitute candidate for Lester "Manoy" Ong.)	5,424	
PPM	Richard Amazon	288	
Total votes			

==== Controversy ====
As Uy's votes outnumbered that of Jalosjos and was poised to be the new winner, the Provincial Board of Canvassers (PBOC) did not proclaim Uy as the winning candidate. This comes after then-COMELEC Chairman Saidamen Pangarungan allegedly sent a proclamation suspension order to PBOC chair Verly Adanza through email to halt Uy's proclamation pending a disqualification case filed against Federico "Kuya Jan" Jalosjos, a candidate that bears a similar name to the incumbent congressman. Apart from that, as the majority of the PBOC were to declare Uy as the winning candidate, Pangarungan supposedly called and advised Adanza not to continue with Uy's proclamation. This led to debates between the PBOC and the two opposing camps, especially as Uy's camp complained that the order was "undated, did not contain a notice to parties, and was not released through the COMELEC clerk" according to Rappler. One of Uy's lawyers, James Verduguez, claimed they reached out to Pangarungan for comment, and the elections chief claimed he has "no idea about what (they're) talking about.”

After over a month, the COMELEC proclaimed the incumbent Jalosjos the winning candidate as they added the nuisance "Kuya Jan" Jalosjos's votes to the incumbent's vote count, to garner 74,533 votes making him the legitimate winner of the race. On July 21, 2022, days prior to the opening of the 19th Congress, the Supreme Court of the Philippines issued a status quo ante order removing the incumbent Jalosjos from his seat after the high court granted the Uy camp's plea to halt COMELEC's crediting of "Kuya Jan" Jalosjos's 5,424 votes to the incumbent Jalosjos, and rendering actions done after its May 12 ruling as "unenforceable."

On August 9, 2023, on a 12–2 vote, the Supreme Court ruled in favor of Jalosjos rival, Roberto "Pinpin" Uy Jr. more than a year after the COMELEC proclaimed the former the winning candidate in the May 2022 elections. The two justices who did not agree with the decision written by Associate Justice Mario Lopez were Marvic Leonen and Alfredo Benjamin Caguioa.

=== 2nd District ===
2022 Philippine House of Representatives election in the Second District of Zamboanga del Norte
Party	Candidate	Votes	%
PDP–Laban	Glona Labadlabad (incumbent)	112,616	
Independent	Sonia Cabigon	8,264	
Total votes			
PDP–Laban hold			

=== 3rd District ===
2022 Philippine House of Representatives election in the Third District of Zamboanga del Norte
Party	Candidate	Votes	%
Liberal	Adrian Michael "Ian" Amatong	58,873	
Nacionalista	Cesar Jalosjos	46,062	
PROMDI	Joventino "Ben" Diamante	14,826	
Independent	Moises Aballe Jr.	802	
Total votes			

== City and municipal elections ==
=== 1st district ===
==== Dapitan ====
Incumbent mayor Rosalina Jalosjos is ineligible for reelection, and opted to run for governor. Her party nominated former 1st district representative Bullet Jalosjos as their nominee. Ruel Nadela of the National Unity Party filed his candidacy for mayor, but was either removed or withdrawn from the list of candidates for an undisclosed reason.

Dapitan mayoralty election
Party	Candidate	Votes	%
Nacionalista	Seth Frederick "Bullet" Jalosjos	18,718	
PDP–Laban	Roberto "Berto Semento" Uy	16,118	
Total votes			

Dapitan vice mayoralty election
Party	Candidate	Votes	%
APP	Alfredo "Al" Sy	18,038	
PDP–Laban	Jimmy Patrick Israel "Jimboy" Chan (incumbent)	15,671	
Total votes			

Dapitan City Council election
Party	Candidate	Votes	%
APP	Jezebel "Bing" Balisado (incumbent)	17,939	
APP	Mitzie Dulawan	16,848	
APP	Divine Patilano (incumbent)	16,785	
APP	Modesta "Modess" Hamoy-Malayao	16,681	
Nacionalista	Ronie "Pareng Hope" Jarapan (incumbent)	16,300	
APP	Joseph Ryan Agolong	16,218	
Nacionalista	Noel Sardane	16,017	
Nacionalista	Tarcisio "Tesiong" Bayron	15,910	
PDP–Laban	Javert Greg "Bembem" Hamoy (incumbent)	15,873	
Nacionalista	Claver "Torni Clavs" Pajaren	15,799	
PDP–Laban	Ivor Zamora	15,728	
PDP–Laban	Tom Jerry Sagario	15,562	
APP	Ludivico "Vicoy" Hamoy	15,471	
PDP–Laban	Iolus Edgar "Yulus" Adasa	15,312	
PDP–Laban	Gabriel Cad (incumbent)	15,027	
PDP–Laban	Jeneth "Inday" Napigquit-Baje	14,662	
PDP–Laban	Giovanni "Giovan" Page	14,090	
PDP–Laban	Eleuterio "Engr. Jun" Galleposo Jr.	13,977	
PDP–Laban	Edna "Baby" Abad	13,821	
PDP–Laban	Uldarico "Uldy" Calasang	13,731	
Independent	Lemuel "Doy" Largo	767	
Total votes			

==== La Libertad ====
Incumbent mayor Romeo Mejias is term-limited and prohibited from running for a fourth consecutive term. His party fielded Liza Mejias for the position, with Romeo Mejias himself running for vice mayor.

La Libertad Mayoralty Election
Party	Candidate	Votes	%
PDP–Laban	Liza Mejias	3,277	
Nacionalista	Esterlita "Laling" Aranas	1,143	
Total votes			

La Libertad Vice Mayoralty Election
Party	Candidate	Votes	%
PDP–Laban	Romeo Mejias	3,695	
APP	Maureen Abanilla	577	
Total votes			

==== Mutia ====
Incumbent mayor Lorrymir Adasa is running for re-election, against former Zamboanga del Norte Electric Cooperative general manager Adelmo Laput. Incumbent vice mayor Arthur Tenorio, who is eligible for re-election, initially opted not to run, but had his decision changed.

Mutia Mayoralty Election
Party	Candidate	Votes	%
PDP–Laban	Lorrymir Adasa (incumbent)	4,628	
Nacionalista	Adelmo Laput (Note: He is a substitute candidate for Lorna "Saysay" Sumenday.)	3,293	
Total votes			
PDP–Laban hold			

Mutia Vice Mayoralty Election
Party	Candidate	Votes	%
PDP–Laban	Christian James "Chan-Chan" Kwan	4,676	
APP	Arthur Tenorio (Note: He is a substitute candidate for Vincent Carlo Gudmalin.)	3,116	
Total votes			
PDP–Laban gain from Nacionalista			

==== Piñan (New Piñan) ====
Incumbent Vice Mayor Junjun Cimafranca opted to run for mayor. His party fielded incumbent Councilor Rommel Gudmalin for Vice Mayor.

Piñan Mayoralty Election
Party	Candidate	Votes	%
Nacionalista	Cecilia "Cely" Jalosjos-Carreon (incumbent)	6,075	
PDP–Laban	Deogracias "Junjun" Cimafranca	5,749	
Total votes			

Piñan Vice Mayoralty Election
Party	Candidate	Votes	%
PDP–Laban	Rommel Gudmalin	5,802	
Nacionalista	Ignacio "Kulay" Galan	5,560	
Total votes			

==== Polanco ====
Incumbents mayor Boyet Olvis and vice mayor Fred Bait-it are running for re-election.

Polanco Mayoralty Election
Party	Candidate	Votes	%
APP	Evan Hope "Boyet" Olvis (incumbent)	10,318	
PDP–Laban	Peter Gibson "GB" Regencia	7,638	
Independent	Efren Suicano	47	
Total votes			

Polanco Vice Mayoralty Election
Party	Candidate	Votes	%
Nacionalista	Alfredo "Fred" Bait-it (incumbent)	9,383	
PDP–Laban	Ray Geynill "Gazzi" Samonte	7,835	
Total votes			

==== Rizal ====
Incumbents mayor Fiona Manigsaca and vice mayor Riel Manigsaca are running for re-election.

Rizal Mayoralty Election
Party	Candidate	Votes	%
PDP–Laban	Marissa Manigsaca	5,649	
Nacionalista	Fiona Marie Manigsaca (incumbent)	4,646	
Total votes			
PDP–Laban gain from APP			

Rizal Vice Mayoralty Election
Party	Candidate	Votes	%
PDP–Laban	Jose Salac	5,099	
APP	Roseller "Riel" Manigsaca (incumbent)	4,732	
Total votes			
PDP–Laban gain from Nacionalista			

==== Sergio Osmeña Sr. ====
Incumbent mayor Augustines Magsalay is running for re-election.

Sergio Osmeña Sr. Mayoralty Election
Party	Candidate	Votes	%
Nacionalista	Augustines Magsalay (incumbent)	7,965	
PDP–Laban	Glen Yu	5,690	
Total votes			

Sergio Osmeña Sr. Vice Mayoralty Election
Party	Candidate	Votes	%
APP	Sunny Tiso	7,330	
PDP–Laban	Ruben Andilab	5,658	
Total votes			

==== Sibutad ====
Incumbents mayor Fracio Caidic and vice mayor Naring Obnimaga are running for re-election.

Sibutad Mayoralty Election
Party	Candidate	Votes	%
PDP–Laban	Eufracio "Fracio" Caidic (incumbent)	5,530	
Nacionalista	Romeo "Utol Meo" Jalosjos III	5,424	
PFP	Raymond Ageas	39	
Total votes			
PDP–Laban hold			

Sibutad Vice Mayoralty Election
Party	Candidate	Votes	%
APP	Vicente "Inting" Elumba	5,452	
PDP–Laban	Genaro "Naring" Obnimaga (incumbent)	5,138	
PFP	Rogelio Avenido	29	
Total votes			
APP gain from PDP–Laban			

=== 2nd district ===
==== Dipolog ====
Incumbent mayor Darel Dexter Uy is running for re-election; incumbent vice mayor Horacio Velasco is term-limited and ineligible to run for reelection. Uy's party nominated incumbent vice governor Senen Angeles for city vice mayor. Mayor Uy will face Rommel Jalosjos, businessman and former governor of Zamboanga Sibugay. Lawyer and perennial candidate Clyde Naong, who ran and was defeated in the 2019 mayoralty, is making his second attempt for the position.

Dipolog mayoralty election
Party	Candidate	Votes	%
PDP–Laban	Darel Dexter Uy (incumbent)	34,067	50.75%
Nacionalista	Rommel Jalosjos	31,333	46.68%
PFP	Clyde Naong	1,637	2.44%
Independent	Leonard Eddai	88	0.13%
Total votes		67,125	100%
PDP–Laban hold			

Dipolog vice mayoralty election
Party	Candidate	Votes	%
PDP–Laban	Senen Angeles	33,063	
APP	Edionar "Loloy Kasayuran" Zamoras	25,992	
PFP	Thaddeus Theodore Sorronda	2,838	
Total votes			
PDP–Laban hold			

Dipolog City Council election
Party	Candidate	Votes	%
PDP–Laban	James Cyril "Toytoy" Ruiz III (incumbent)	34,515	
PDP–Laban	Roger Asprer (incumbent)	33,477	
PDP–Laban	Roseller "Matoy" Barinaga	33,222	
PDP–Laban	Jonald "Jojo" Napigquit	32,439	
PDP–Laban	James Verduguez (incumbent)	32,139	
PDP–Laban	Marilou Calibo (incumbent)	31,999	
PDP–Laban	Romulo "Muling" Soliva	29,796	
PDP–Laban	Eduardo "Eddie" Baron (incumbent)	27,501	
PDP–Laban	Praxides "Praxy" Rubia (incumbent)	26,468	
PDP–Laban	Maynard "Bebe" Baes (incumbent)	25,486	
APP	Roberto "Bert" Pinsoy	20,484	
Nacionalista	Carlito "Engr. Bong" Ortega	19,667	
APP	Paul Clark Gudmalin	18,793	
APP	Shiela Velasco (Note: She is a substitute candidate for Edna Villanueva-de Leon.)	16,972	
Nacionalista	Benjie "Kap Benchoi" Maligro	16,908	
Nacionalista	Mike Sanico (Note: He is a substitute candidate for Ronald Agan.)	15,209	
Nacionalista	Philamer Baes	15,182	
APP	Mary Jane Leopoldo (Note: She is a substitute candidate for Chona Pansipansi.)	13,604	
APP	Radel "Radz Radel" Abas	13,466	
Nacionalista	Joven Uy	8,695	
Independent	Aimee Rose Santos	3,138	
PFP	Razul Pango	3,130	
Independent	Ramilo "Ramil" Rodriguez	2,856	
Independent	Rhoebe Christie "RC" Paez	2,800	
Independent	Willard "Willy" Lear	2,408	
Independent	James Carter Realista	2,187	
Independent	Hermelo "Melo" Atayan	1,688	
Total votes			

==== Jose Dalman (Ponot) ====
Mayor Rachel "Inday" Ferrater and Vice Mayor Edwin Dalam, both incumbents elected after the 2019 election, are term-limited and are prohibited from running for a fourth consecutive term. Ferrater's party, PDP-Laban, fielded Allen Ferrater as their candidate for mayor. On the other hand, Dalam is running for mayor under the Nacionalista Party.

Jose Dalman Mayoralty Election
Party	Candidate	Votes	%
PDP–Laban	Allen Ferrater	8,933	
Nacionalista	Edwin Dalam	4,875	
Total votes			

Jose Dalman Vice Mayoralty Election
Party	Candidate	Votes	%
PDP–Laban	Julieta "Juliet" Macapaz	7,953	
Nacionalista	Russell Adaza	4,871	
Independent	Eduardo Rey Labadlabad	574	
Total votes			

==== Katipunan ====
Mayor Patchie Eguia is running for re-election. Incumbent vice mayor Tessie Matildo of PDP-Laban, who replaced then winning vice mayor (in the 2019 election) Crisostomo "Cris" Eguia Jr. after being convicted for unliquidated cash advantages during his time as mayor, is eligible for re-election, but opted to run for SB Member. Her party nominated incumbent SB Members Maiko Wong and Nonie Jumawak as candidates for mayor and vice mayor respectively.

Katipunan Mayoralty Election
Party	Candidate	Votes	%
PDP–Laban	Jose Michael Meiko "Maiko" Wong	11,145	
PFP	Patchito "Patchie" Eguia (incumbent)	8,838	
Nacionalista	Crisostomo "Dondon" Eguia III	4,380	
Total votes			
PDP–Laban gain from APP			

Katipunan Vice Mayoralty Election
Party	Candidate	Votes	%
PDP–Laban	Antonio "Nonie" Jumawak	11,983	
Nacionalista	Paul John Reinante	10,308	
Total votes			
PDP–Laban hold			

==== Manukan ====
Incumbents mayor Eugene Caballero and vice mayor Enriquita Winters are running for re-election.

Manukan Mayoralty Election
Party	Candidate	Votes	%
PDP–Laban	Eugene Caballero (incumbent)	15,751	
Independent	Arnold Camillus Fabella	784	
Total votes			
PDP–Laban hold			

Manukan Vice Mayoralty Election
Party	Candidate	Votes	%
PDP–Laban	Enriquita Winters (incumbent)	14,519	
Independent	Catalino Hisula	613	
Total votes			
PDP–Laban hold			

==== Pres. Manuel A. Roxas ====
Incumbent mayor Jan Hendrick Vallecer is term-limited and ineligible for re-election. His party nominated incumbent vice mayor Junior Rengquijo as their mayoralty candidate.

Pres. Manuel A. Roxas Mayoralty Election
Party	Candidate	Votes	%
PDP–Laban	Ismael "Junior" Rengquijo	6,244	
PFP	Leonides "Dodoy" Parilla	4,662	
PROMDI	Rheden Pialago	69	
Independent	Carlito "Carling" Feras	49	
Total votes			

Pres. Manuel A. Roxas Vice Mayoralty Election
Party	Candidate	Votes	%
Nacionalista	Rolando "Jun Jun" Yebes	4,962	
PDP–Laban	Josephine "Mam Jo" Vallecer	4,393	
PFP	Emma Cabiara (Note: She is a substitute candidate for Pablito "Nonoy" Tubang.)	1,055	
Independent	Socrates Sonyber "Imong" Feras	81	
Total votes			

==== Siayan ====
Incumbent mayor Josecor Gepolongca is eligible for re-election, but opted to run for vice mayor. His party nominated former mayor Flora Villarosa for mayor.

Siayan Mayoralty Election
Party	Candidate	Votes	%
PDP–Laban	Alberto "Ali" Bongcawel	11,123	
PFP	Flora Villarosa	8,275	
Total votes			
PDP–Laban gain from Nacionalista			

Siayan Vice Mayoralty Election
Party	Candidate	Votes	%
PFP	Josecor Gepolongca	9,232	
PDP–Laban	Nelma Adaza-Ochotorena	8,764	
Independent	Regie Bandivas	146	
Total votes			
PFP gain from APP			

==== Sindangan ====
Incumbents mayor Dodoy Labadlabad and vice mayor Boy Sy are running for re-election.

Sindangan Mayoralty Election
Party	Candidate	Votes	%
PDP–Laban	Rosendo "Dodoy" Labadlabad (incumbent)	32,098	
PFP	Leoncio "Bebot" Orilloza Jr.	6,424	
Total votes			

Sindangan Vice Mayoralty Election
Party	Candidate	Votes	%
PDP–Laban	Nilo Florentino "Boy" Sy (incumbent)	31,207	
PFP	Ronil Yu	2,604	
Total votes			

=== 3rd district ===
==== Baliguian ====
Incumbent Mayor Albina "Obing" Esmali opted not to run for re-election. Vice Mayor Gani Esmali, who was re-elected for the position after the 2019 election, died in an ambush in Siocon on January 11, 2020. With this, top ranking SB Member Dulcisimo Bontia Jr. took over Vice Mayor Esmali's place in succession.

Baliguian Mayoralty Election
Party	Candidate	Votes	%
PDP–Laban	Cresencio Suson	3,780	
Nacionalista	Gani "Junior" Esmali, Jr.	3,594	
Total votes			
Nacionalista gain from PDP–Laban			

Baliguian Vice Mayoralty Election
Party	Candidate	Votes	%
APP	Vivian Chiong	2,866	
Independent	Dulcisimo "Dondon" Bontia Jr. (incumbent)	2,213	
PDP–Laban	Harieto "Tong" Dacup	1,976	
Independent	Arola Kiran	47	
Total votes			
APP gain from PDP–Laban			

==== Godod ====
Incumbent mayor Toto Matildo is running unopposed; incumbent vice mayor Ferdinand "Banoy" Caboverde is running for SB Member, and incumbent SB Member Samuel "Lolong" Labad is running to take his place without opposition.

Godod Mayoralty Election
Party	Candidate	Votes	%
PDP–Laban	Abel "Toto" Matildo (incumbent)	6,931	
Total votes			
PDP–Laban hold			

Godod Vice Mayoralty Election
Party	Candidate	Votes	%
PDP–Laban	Samuel Labad	6,225	
Total votes			
PDP–Laban hold			

==== Gutalac ====
Mayor Onesimo "Jun" Coma and Vice Mayor Joel Tendero, both incumbents elected after the 2019 election, are term-limited and are prohibited from running for a fourth consecutive term. Coma's party, PDP-Laban, fielded Justin Quimbo as their candidate for mayor with Coma himself running for vice mayor. On the other hand, Tendero is running for mayor under PROMDI.

Gutalac Mayoralty Election
Party	Candidate	Votes	%
PDP–Laban	Eddie Justin Quimbo	8,786	
Nacionalista	Mariano "Nonoy" Candelaria Jr.	5,811	
PROMDI	Joel "Yulan" Tendero	1,549	
PPM	Bernie Atis	69	
Total votes			

Gutalac Vice Mayoralty Election
Party	Candidate	Votes	%
PDP–Laban	Onesimo "Jun" Coma	7,554	
APP	Marrianne Jafen Candelaria	7,151	
PROMDI	Gonzalo "Sally" Tendero	577	
PPM	Romualdo "Maldo" Gimang (Note: He is a substitute candidate for Rolito Lapinig.)	136	
Total votes			

==== Kalawit ====
Incumbents mayor Jun Antojado and vice mayor Merly Masugbo are running for re-election.

Kalawit Mayoralty Election
Party	Candidate	Votes	%
PDP–Laban	Salvador "Jun" Antojado (incumbent)	7,161	
Nacionalista	Rey Bihag	3,974	
Total votes			

Kalawit Vice Mayoralty Election
Party	Candidate	Votes	%
PDP–Laban	Merly Masugbo (incumbent)	7,056	
APP	Crisostomo "Jun" Garate, Jr.	3,080	
Total votes			

==== Labason ====
Mayor Eddie Quimbo, who was re-elected after the 2019 election, is term-limited and prohibited from running for a fourth consecutive term. Quimbo's party, PDP-Laban, fielded Jed Quimbo as their candidate for mayor with incumbent vice mayor Virgilio "Tony Yap" Go running for re-election.

Labason Mayoralty Election
Party	Candidate	Votes	%
PDP–Laban	Jelster Ed "Jed" Quimbo	10,070	
Lakas	Ronald Joseph "RJ" Ocaya	7,664	
KBL	Ferdinand "Joffer" Uy	44	
Total votes			

Labason Vice Mayoralty Election
Party	Candidate	Votes	%
PDP–Laban	Virgilio "Tony Yap" Go (incumbent)	10,361	
Nacionalista	Riza Melicor	6,249	
Total votes			

==== Leon B. Postigo (Bacungan) ====
Mayor Hermogenes "Remie" Cordova, who was re-elected as mayor after the 2019 local elections, died in 2020, and Vice Mayor Aidaroz Hambali took over Cordova's place as Mayor of Leon B. Postigo in succession.

Leon B. Postigo Mayoralty Election
Party	Candidate	Votes	%
Nacionalista	Runie "Bobbyjam" Jamora	4,670	
PDP–Laban	Aidaroz "Daroz" Hambali (incumbent)	2,956	
Total votes			

Leon B. Postigo Vice Mayoralty Election
Party	Candidate	Votes	%
PDP–Laban	Rodrigo "Nonoy" Acaylar	3,390	
Nacionalista	Annie Rose Elumba	2,563	
APP	Ednu-Sajar "Esah" Hambali	1,355	
Total votes			

==== Liloy ====
Incumbents mayor Jun Uy and vice mayor John Momar Insong are running for re-election, with the former running for re-election unopposed.

Liloy Mayoralty Election
Party	Candidate	Votes	%
PDP–Laban	Roberto "Jun" Uy Jr. (incumbent)		
Total votes			

Liloy Vice Mayoralty Election
Party	Candidate	Votes	%
Nacionalista	Mervyn "Kap Benben" Caperida		
PDP–Laban	John Momar Insong (incumbent)		
Total votes			

==== Salug ====
Incumbent vice mayor William Maribojoc is term-limited, and opted to run for mayor.

Salug Mayoralty Election
Party	Candidate	Votes	%
Nacionalista	William "Mabuhay" Maribojoc	5,282	
PDP–Laban	Melodie Tolin (incumbent)	4,832	
Total votes			

Salug Vice Mayoralty Election
Party	Candidate	Votes	%
PDP–Laban	Saul Maraon	5,021	
APP	Jeffrey Lim	4,721	
Total votes			

==== Sibuco ====
Sibuco Mayoralty Election
Party	Candidate	Votes	%
Nacionalista	Norbideiri "Bong" Edding		
PDP–Laban	Joel Ventura (incumbent)		
Total votes			

Sibuco Vice Mayoralty Election
Party	Candidate	Votes	%
PDP–Laban	Lood Alipon		
Nacionalista	Abdulsalam "Salam" Dambong		
PFP	Harol Pia		
Total votes			

==== Siocon ====
Incumbent mayor Julius Lobrigas is term-limited and prohibited from running for a fourth term. His party fielded Jinky Lobrigas as candidate for mayor, with Julius Lobrigas himself running for vice mayor. Incumbent vice mayor Karon Esmali is eligible, and is running for re-election as vice mayor.

Siocon Mayoralty Election
Party	Candidate	Votes	%
Nacionalista	Ceasar Soriano	8,071	
PDP–Laban	Agnes "Jinky" Lobrigas	6,929	
PROMDI	Iftikhar "Teng Arabi" Pawaki	5,353	
Total votes			

Siocon Vice Mayoralty Election
Party	Candidate	Votes	%
PDP–Laban	Julius Lobrigas	8,091	
APP	Karon Esmali (incumbent)	7,049	
PROMDI	Ailene Arabi	4,443	
Total votes			

==== Sirawai ====
Sirawai Mayoralty Election
Party	Candidate	Votes	%
PDP–Laban	Aljazar Janihim	10,753	
Nacionalista	Amador Ontong	2,893	
Total votes			

Sirawai Vice Mayoralty Election
Party	Candidate	Votes	%
PDP–Laban	Pulman "Pahambong" Darquez (incumbent)	9,864	
APP	Nolidia Inding	3,340	
Total votes			

==== Tampilisan ====
Tampilisan Mayoralty Election
Party	Candidate	Votes	%
PDP–Laban	Norabeth "Bading" Carloto	5,915	
Nacionalista	John Michael Jalosjos	5,062	
Total votes			

Tampilisan Vice Mayoralty Election
Party	Candidate	Votes	%
PDP–Laban	Generico "Boboy" Jauculan (incumbent)	6,094	
Total votes			
PDP–Laban hold			
