= Lake Wood (Philippines) =

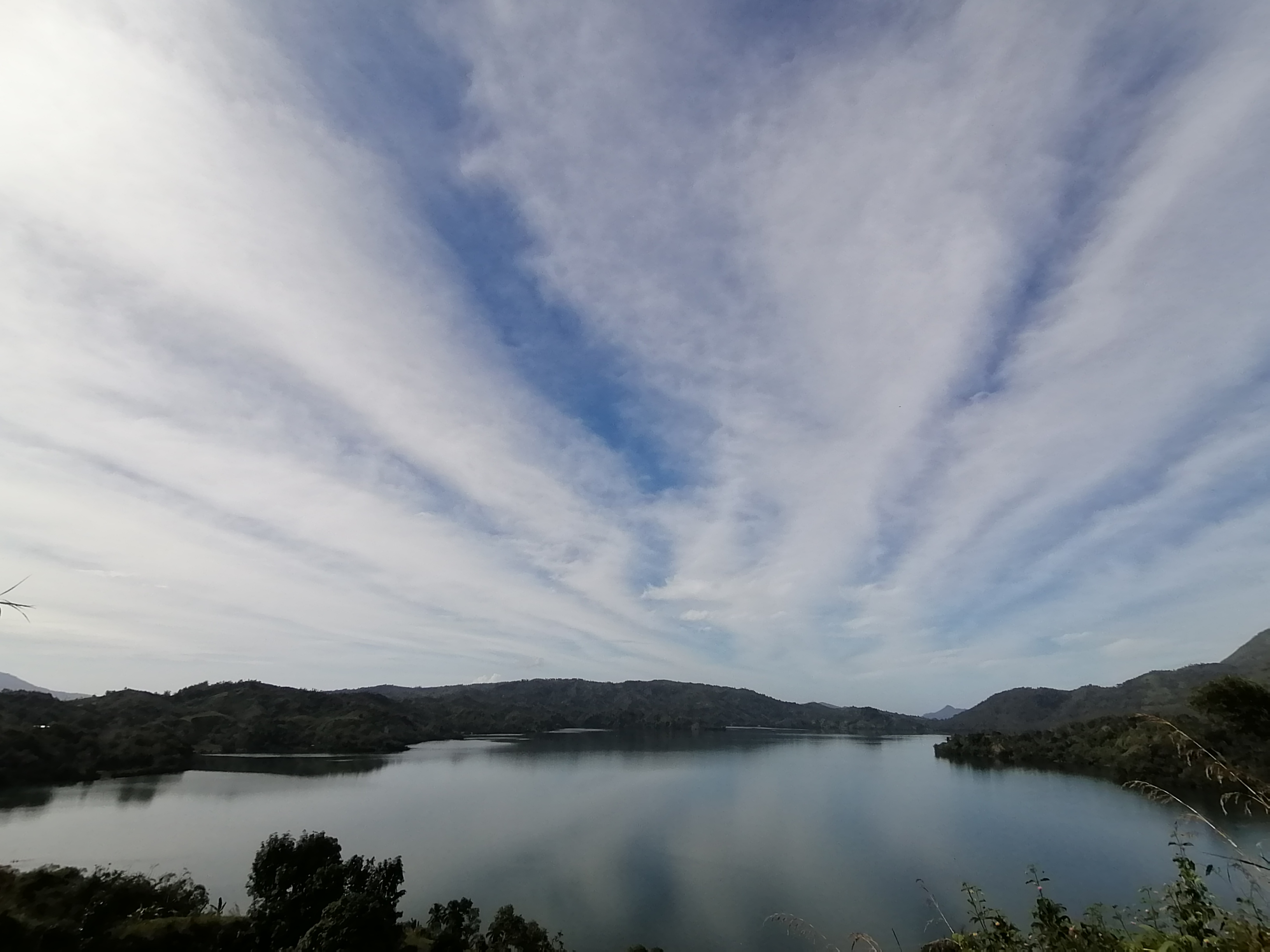
- Lake Wood in 2019

- Location in Mindanao Location IN the Philippines
- Location: Zamboanga Peninsula, Mindanao
- Coordinates: 7°50′48″N 123°9′55″E
- Type: Lake
- Primary inflows: Rainfall and groundwater
- Primary outflows: Biswangan River
- Surface area: 7.38 km^{2} (2.85 sq mi)
- Max. depth: 85 m (278.87 ft)
- Surface elevation: 320 m (1,049.87 ft)
- Settlements: Lakewood; Kumalarang

Lake Wood (Subanen: Danaw) is a large lake located in the province of Zamboanga del Sur in Mindanao, Philippines. The lake is the largest in the province, and is situated at the foot of Mt. Serongan. On its shores are the municipalities of Lakewood and Kumalarang.

== History ==
The lake was originally called Danaw (which is still being used by the Subanen tribe), and is part of the Subanen's ancestral domain. In 1904, in an expedition from Misamis to Dumanquilas Bay, Captain Cornelius C. Smith of the 14th Cavalry Regiment of the United States Army found Lake Danaw and proceeded to report it to the American Administration. Captain Smith then renamed the lake as Lake Leonard Wood, after the Governor-General of the time, Governor Leonard Wood. Over time, the lake's name changed to Lake Wood.

== Physical characteristics ==
Lake Wood has a surface area of 7.38 km^{2} (2.85 sq mi) and a maximum depth of 85 m (278.87 ft). The lake's elevation is lower on the southeast side.

The lake is fed by rainfall and groundwater. On the southeast side is the Biswangan River, the lake's only outlet, which flows into Dumanquilas Bay.

== Biodiversity ==
Because of the limited information about Lake Wood, not much is known about the flora and fauna of the lake. There is only one known species of endemic fish that resides in the lake, that is the Rasbora philippina, locally known as Porang.

Aside from fauna, several species of aquatic vegetation also grow in the lake:

- Hydrilla verticillata
- Pontederia crassipes
- Ipomoea aquatica (kangkóng)
- Nypa fruticans (nipa palm)
- Nymphaea

== Legends ==
The lake is said by residents to be inhabited by a giant, man-eating, fish-like creature called the "Busiso" which is attracted by a certain Subanen chant. This has led to a superstition against singing while sailing along the lake.
