= Buug =

Municipality in Zamboanga Sibugay, Philippines

- Municipality
- Municipality of Buug
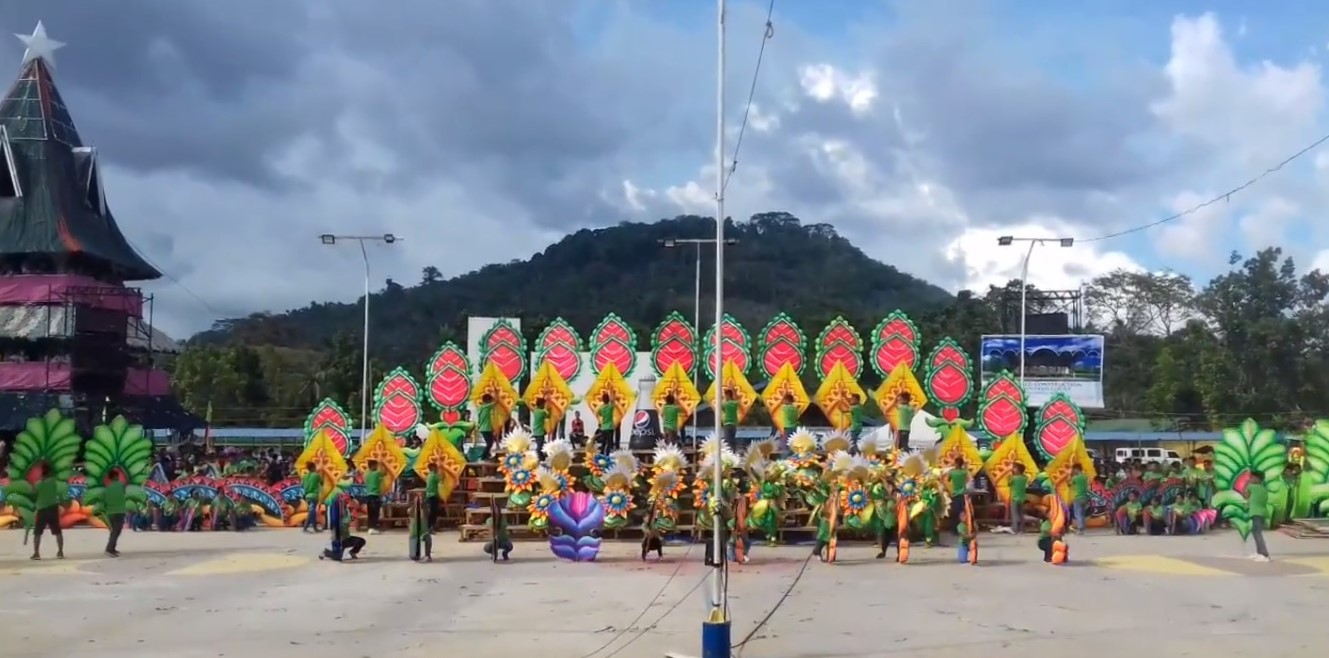
- A street dance performance during the Bog Festival

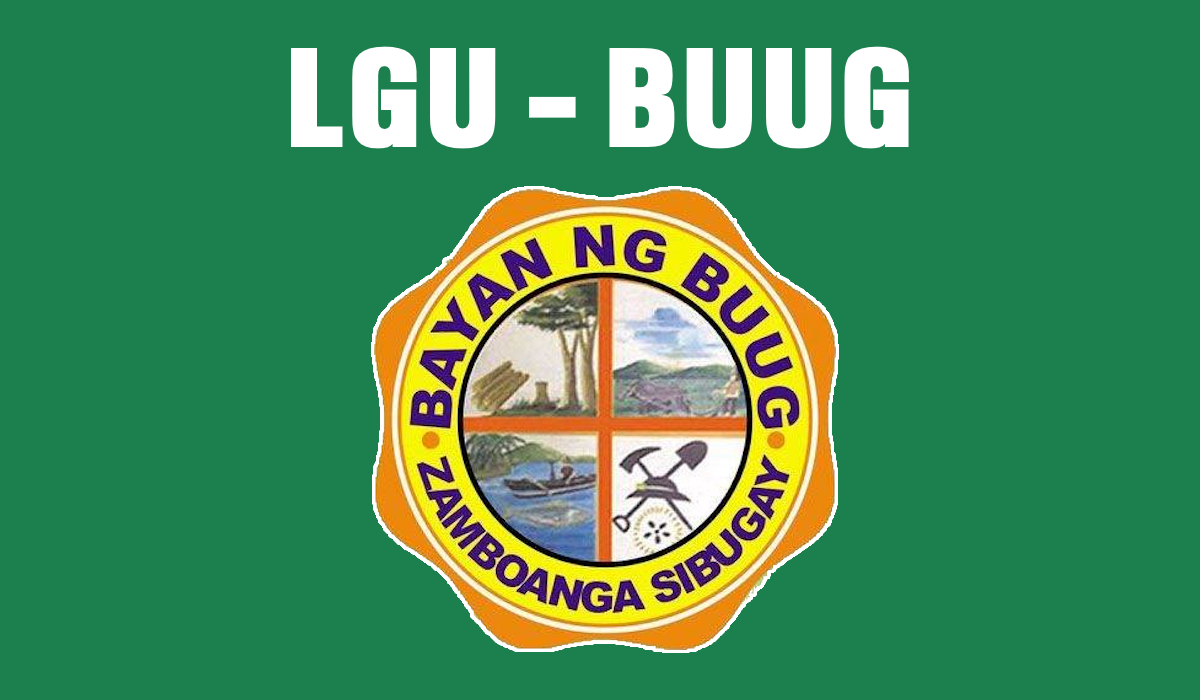
- Flag Seal

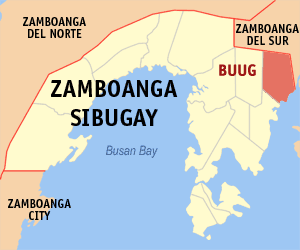
- Map of Zamboanga Sibugay with Buug highlighted
- Interactive map of Buug
- Location within the Philippines
- Coordinates: 7°43′43″N 123°03′39″E
- Country: Philippines
- Region: Zamboanga Peninsula
- Province: Zamboanga Sibugay
- District: 1st district
- Founded: February 2, 1960
- Barangays: 27 (see Barangays)

Government
  - Type: Sangguniang Bayan
  - Mayor: Dionesia B. Lagas
  - Vice Mayor: Jonam R. Lagas
  - Representative: Marlo Bancoro
  - Municipal Council: Members: Marvin Jessie G. Gako; Sherwin Quintero; Romeo Cerbo; Freida C. Curiba; Abdul S. Dimasagka; Julio S. Alcantara; Eduardo Emorecha; Renator Banagan
  - Electorate: 24,616 voters (2025)

Area
  - Total: 134.06 km^{2} (51.76 sq mi)
- Elevation: 174 m (571 ft)
- Highest elevation: 551 m (1,808 ft)
- Lowest elevation: 0 m (0 ft)

Population (2024 census)
  - Total: 38,730
  - Density: 288.9/km^{2} (748.2/sq mi)
  - Households: 9,019

Economy
  - Income class: 2nd municipal income class
  - Poverty incidence: 19.84% (2023)
  - Revenue: ₱ 232 million (2024)
  - Assets: ₱ 862.9 million (2024)
  - Expenditure: ₱ 127.6 million (2024)
  - Liabilities: ₱ 174.4 million (2024)

Service provider
  - Electricity: Zamboanga del Sur 2 Electric Cooperative (ZAMSURECO 2)
- Time zone: UTC+8 (PST)
- ZIP code: 7009
- PSGC: 0908302000
- IDD : area code: +63 (0)62
- Native languages: Subanon; Cebuano; Chavacano; Tagalog
- Website: www.buugsibugay.gov.ph

Buug, officially the Municipality of Buug (Cebuano: Lungsod sa Buug; Chavacano: Municipalidad de Buug; Maguindanaon: Inged nu Buug; Tagalog: Bayan ng Buug), is a municipality in the province of Zamboanga Sibugay, Philippines. According to the 2024 census, it has a population of 38,730 people.

== Etymology ==
The name Buug was derived from the word bog, a Subanen word for secondary forest which is the same as the Cebuano-Visayan term buog. Accordingly, a group of Subanens stumbled upon this bog that was endowed with a stream and sufficient supply of water while they were moving from one place to another in search of a safe place to start a living away from marauders who were in search for slaves and things to loot. From then on people began to refer to the bog as Buug.

== History ==
Buug grew into a thriving community through the initiative of the timuays, the Subanen chieftains, who held leadership of the community. A school was opened which drew in the first trickle of Subanon, Cebuano, and other Visayan settlers. When the Samar Mining Company (SAMICO) opened the Sibuguey project in 1957 at Bobuan (now part of the municipality of Bayog), the next group of settlers flooded in. More people came when the Pagadian-Zamboanga National Highway reached Buug in 1958. The highway is part of the Pan-Philippine Highway (also known as the Maharlika Highway and AH26).

Buug was originally a barangay of the municipality of Margosatubig and became a baranggay of Malangas when the former was divided in 1951. It became a municipality through Executive Order No. 380 issued by President Carlos P. Garcia on February 2, 1960. Instrumental in the formation of the Municipality of Buug was the persistence of Mr. Quirino M. Gonzales, a fisherman who also was a councilor of Malangas and a native of Merida, Leyte. He is also a distant relative of then Senator Neptali Gonzales. Gonzales became the first appointed mayor and was called the "Father of Buug". After being proclaimed as a municipality, flocks of settlers established residence and trade in the place.

== Geography ==
Buug is located in the central Zamboanga Peninsula, on the island of Mindanao. It has a pentagon-like shape bounded on the south by Dumanquilas Bay, Bayog on the north, Kumalarang on the east, Diplahan on the west, and Malangas on south-west. The distance from Manila to Buug is approximately 790 kilometres (490 mi). It is five hours away from Zamboanga City by bus, one hour and 45 minutes bus drive from the Ipil, and 57 kilometres (35 mi) away from Pagadian, or 45 minutes of travel by bus.

=== Climate ===
Climate data for Buug, Zamboanga Sibugay
Month	Jan	Feb	Mar	Apr	May	Jun	Jul	Aug	Sep	Oct	Nov	Dec	Year
Mean daily maximum °C (°F)	30 (86)	30 (86)	31 (88)	31 (88)	29 (84)	28 (82)	28 (82)	28 (82)	28 (82)	28 (82)	29 (84)	29 (84)	29 (84)
Mean daily minimum °C (°F)	20 (68)	20 (68)	21 (70)	22 (72)	23 (73)	23 (73)	23 (73)	23 (73)	23 (73)	23 (73)	22 (72)	21 (70)	22 (72)
Average precipitation mm (inches)	22 (0.9)	18 (0.7)	23 (0.9)	24 (0.9)	67 (2.6)	120 (4.7)	132 (5.2)	156 (6.1)	119 (4.7)	124 (4.9)	54 (2.1)	24 (0.9)	883 (34.6)
Average rainy days	9.4	9.1	11.5	11.9	20.1	22.5	22.4	23.2	21.5	22.2	15.7	11.5	201
Source: Meteoblue (Use with caution: this is modeled/calculated data, not measured locally.)

It has an average temperature of 26 °C (79 °F) and has an average elevation of 200 metres (660 ft) above sea level. It is away from the typhoon belt and enjoying a Type IV climate, i.e. rainfall is more or less evenly distributed throughout the year.

=== Barangays ===
Buug is politically subdivided into 27 barangays. Each barangay consists of puroks while some have sitios.

- Agutayan
- Bagong Borbon
- Basalem
- Bawang
- Bliss
- Bulaan
- Compostela
- Danlugan
- Datu Panas
- Del Monte
- Guintuloan
- Guitom
- Guminta
- Labrador
- Lantawan
- Mabuhay
- Maganay
- Manlin
- Muyo
- Pamintayan
- Pling
- Poblacion
- Pulog
- San Jose
- Talairan
- Talamimi
- Villacastor (Galit)

== Demographics ==
Population census of Buug

Year	Pop.	±% p.a.
1970	22,858	—
1975	25,724	+2.40%
1980	19,648	−5.24%
1990	32,815	+5.26%
1995	34,175	+0.76%
2000	33,623	−0.35%

Year	Pop.	±% p.a.
2007	34,289	+0.27%
2010	35,969	+1.76%
2015	36,634	+0.35%
2020	38,425	+1.01%
2024	38,730	+0.19%

Source: Philippine Statistics Authority

== Economy ==
Poverty incidence of Buug (%)

Source: Philippine Statistics Authority

Credit institutions and commercial businesses have multiplied. Appliance centers and merchandisers with main branches in big cities have invested in the area. Cottage industries have also sprouted. Buug's economy is based on two sectors categorized by the local government:

1. Agriculture which consists of farming, livestock & poultry, and fisheries.
2. Service Activities such as trade/commerce & industry, finance, personal and community service.

== Government ==
=== Local government ===
The local executive council is administered by a mayor. The legislative council is headed by a vice mayor with ten municipal councilors as members, eight of which are elected, plus the representative of Sangguniang Kabataan and the president of the Association of Barangay Captains (ABC).

=== Elected officials ===
Buug Municipal Council (2025 - 2028)
Position	Name	Party
Congressman	Marlo C. Bancoro	PFP
Mayor	Dionesia B. Lagas	Lakas
Vice Mayor	Jonam R. Lagas	Lakas
Councilors	Abdulrhads A. Dimasagka	Independent
Councilors	William Christopher N. Chua	PFP
Councilors	Marvin Jessie G. Gako	Lakas
Councilors	Sherwin R. Quintero	Lakas
Councilors	Ernita "Allen" A. Paderanga	PFP
Councilors	Rey Christian "Kuku" P. Famor	PFP
Councilors	Romeo L. Cerbeo	Lakas
Councilors	Freida C. Curiba	Lakas

== Education ==
Buug offers a range of educational options, from primary to tertiary levels, catering to diverse fields of study.

=== Tertiary Education ===
- Mindanao State University–Zamboanga Sibugay (MSU-Zamboanga Sibugay): A public university offering a wide range of courses in agriculture, education, fisheries, liberal arts, information technology, hospitality, environmental science, and more. MSU-Zamboanga Sibugay also houses a high school which serves as a laboratory school for its College of Education.
- St. John College of Buug Foundation, Inc.: This private college is the only institution in Buug to offer courses in criminology and business administration.

=== Secondary Education ===
- St. Paul School of Buug: A private Catholic school run by the Sisters of St. Paul of Chartres. Established in 1966, it offers Grade School, Junior High School, and Senior High School education.
- Public High Schools:
  - Buug National High School
  - Del Monte National High School
  - Talairan National High School
  - Basalem National High School
  - Villacastor National High School
- Other High Schools: Additional secondary education options include:
  - The high school department of Mindanao State University-Zamboanga Sibugay
  - The senior high school program at St. John College of Buug Foundation, Inc.
  - The senior high school program at Internacional Colegio de Tecnologia-ICT Main Campus

=== Technical and Vocational Education ===
- Internacional Colegio de Tecnologia-ICT Main Campus: Founded in 2008, this private technical school offers various technical courses and is the only school in Region 9 to offer a cable television installation program.
- Buug National High School- Buug National High School offers TVL programs for senior high school students; Home Economics [Cookery and BPP], ICT [CSS], and Industrial Arts [EIM and Automotive]
- Del Monte National High School- Del Monte offers TVL programs for senior high school students; Home Economics [BPP]
