= Dumanquilas Bay =

- Dumanguilas Bay
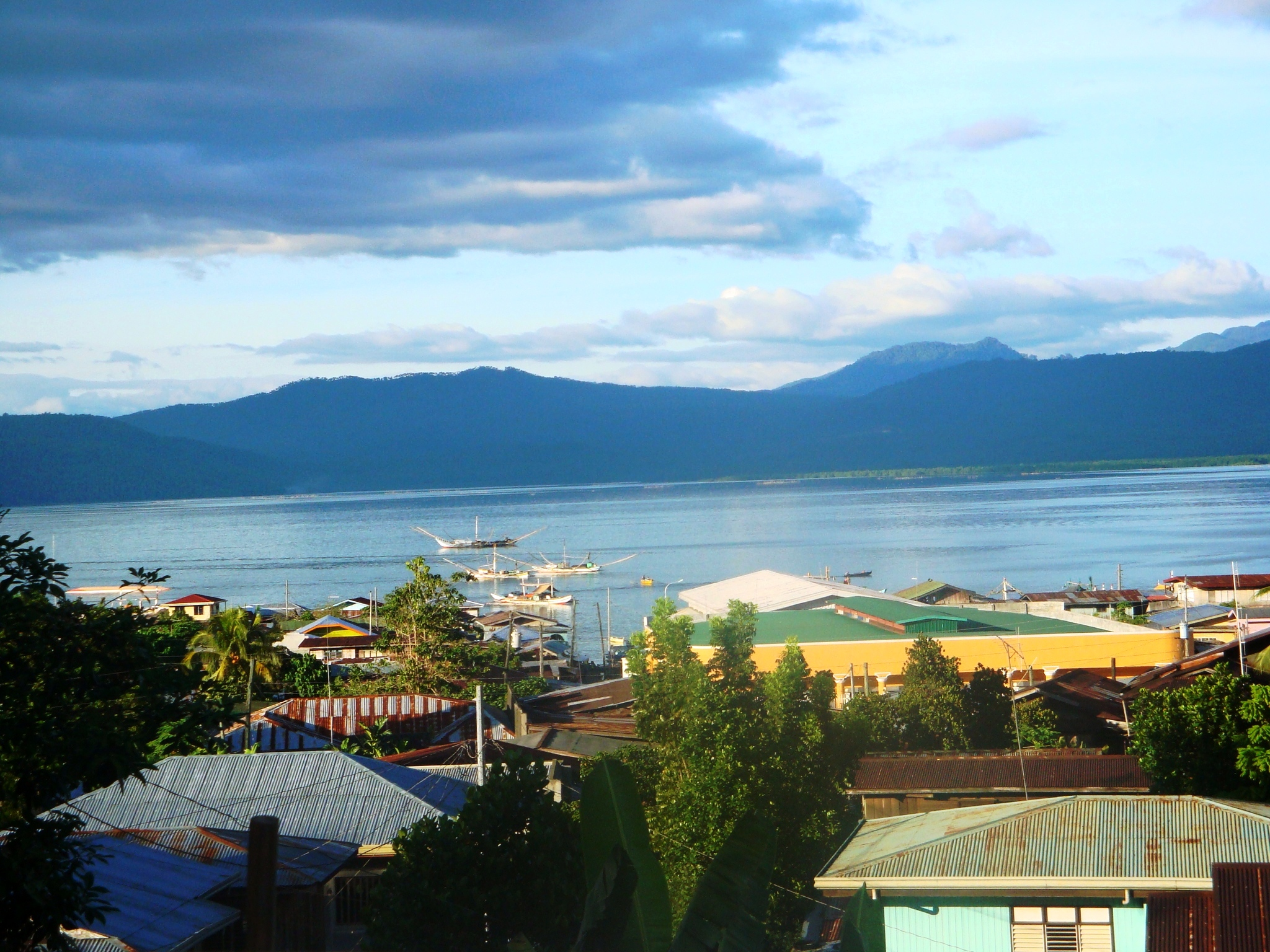

- Location within the Philippines Dumanquilas Bay (Philippines)
- Location: Zamboanga Peninsula, Mindanao, Philippines
- Coordinates: 7°40′22″N 123°05′46″E
- Type: bay
- Part of: Moro Gulf
- Islands: Igat Island + 12 smaller islands
- Settlements: Alicia; Buug; Kumalarang; Lapuyan; Malangas; Margosatubig; Vincenzo Sagun

Dumanquilas Bay (alternatively spelled Dumanguilas Bay) is an arm of the Moro Gulf on the southern side of the Zamboanga Peninsula in western Mindanao island in the Philippines. It is shared between the provinces of Zamboanga del Sur on the eastern and northern shore, and Zamboanga Sibugay on the western shore. An irregularly shaped peninsula extending to Flecha Point separates it from Pagadian Bay to the east, while to the west, the bay connects with Sibuguey Bay through Canalizo Strait which separates Olutanga island from the mainland of Zamboanga. Politically, it is divided between the Zamboanga del Sur municipalities of Margosatubig, Vincenzo Sagun, Lapuyan and Kumalarang, and the Zamboangay Sibugay municipalities of Buug, Malangas and Alicia.

The bay is the location of the Malangas Wharf, the shipping point for the Malangas Coal Reservation. It is known for its extensive mangrove shorelines and rich coral and fish diversity. It has been declared a marine protected area known as the Dumanquilas Bay Protected Landscape and Seascape in 1999.

== Geography ==
Dumanquilas Bay covers an area of about 26,000 hectares (64,000 acres) with depths of between 12 and 120 feet (3.7 and 36.6 m). It is about 18 kilometres (11 mi) wide at its entrance between Lapat Point, the easternmost point of Olutanga Island, and Dumanquilas Point in Vincenzo Sagun, and extends some 23 kilometres (14 mi) inland.

The bay contains several small islands, the largest of which is Igat Island located on its eastern side in Margosatubig municipality which forms the western border of a small inlet called Igat Bay. Near the entrance to the bay, three small islands collectively known as Cherif Islands rise to a height of between 100 and 200 metres (330 and 660 ft) above sea level and divides the channel into two passages. At the head of the bay in Kumalarang municipality are two small islands known as Fatima Islands. On the Zamboanga Sibugay side are Muda, Dacula and Paya islands. Other islands include Cabo, Putili, Dayana and Triton Island, on the eastern side in Vincenzo Sagun.

Dumanquilas Bay receives inflow from several rivers and streams including Lapuyan River, Kumal River and Muduing River. It faces threats from illegal fishing and mangrove depletion.
