= Dapitan City Council =

Legislative body of the city of Dapitan, Philippines

Dapitan City Council Konseho sa Dakbayan sa Dapitan Sangguniang Panlungsod ng Dapitan
- 28th City Council of Dapitan
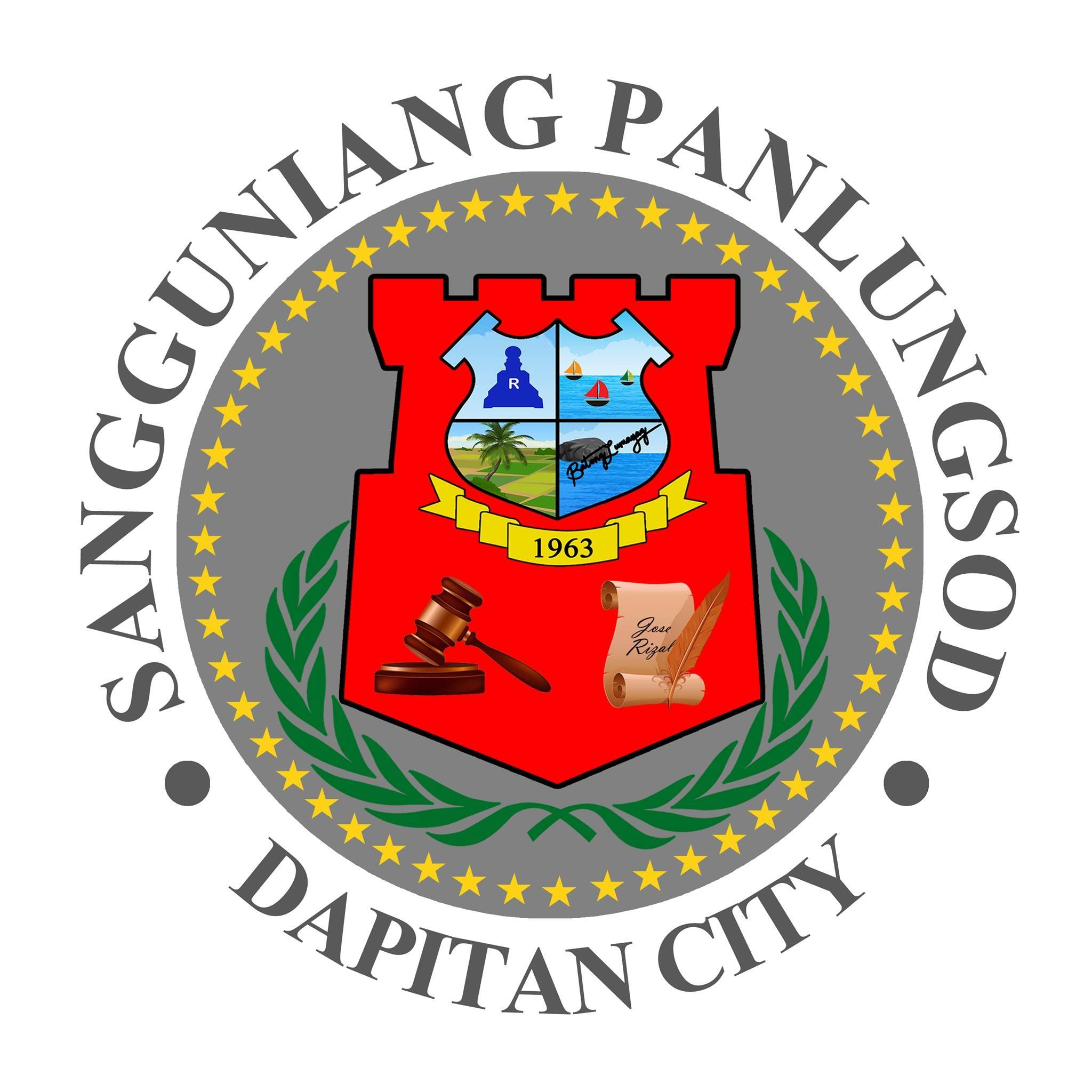

Type
- Type: Unicameral
- Term limits: 3 terms (9 years)

Leadership
- Presiding Officer: Gabriel M. Cad, Lakas since 30 June 2025
- Presiding Officer pro tempore: Raul B. Carreon, Lakas since 30 June 2025
- Floor Leader: Jeneth C. Napigquit-Baje, Lakas since 30 June 2025

Structure
- Seats: 10 councilors; 2 ex officio members; 1 ex officio presiding officer
- Political groups: Lakas (11) Nonpartisan (2)
- Length of term: 3 years
- Authority: Dapitan City Charter; Local Government Code of the Philippines

Elections
- Voting system: Plurality-at-large voting (10 seats); Indirect elections (2 seats)
- Last election: May 12, 2025
- Next election: May 15, 2028

Meeting place
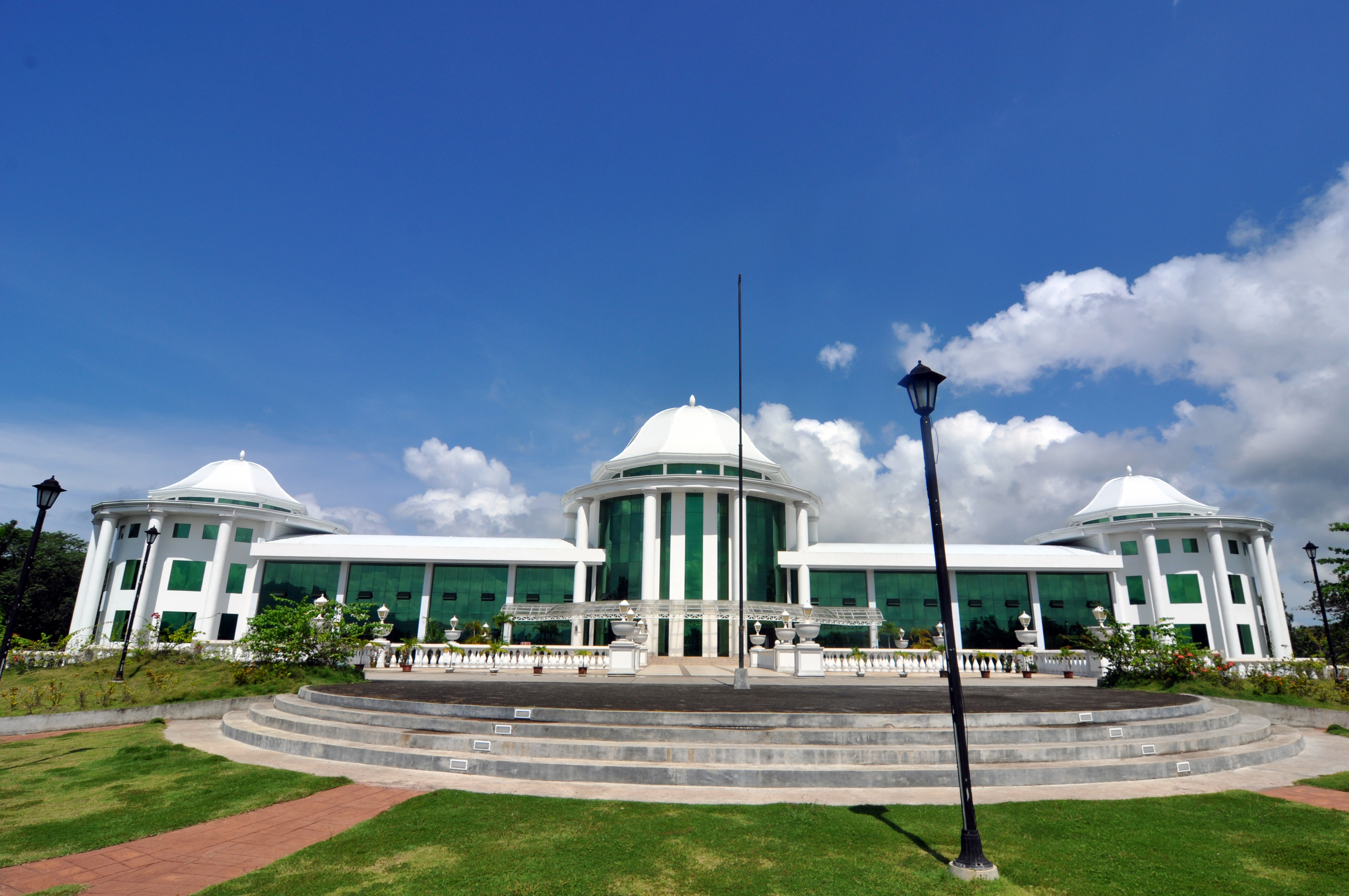
- SP Session Hall, New Government Center, National Highway corner Sunset Boulevard, Lawaan, Dawo, Dapitan

The Dapitan City Council (Filipino: Sangguniang Panlungsod ng Dapitan) is Dapitan's Sangguniang Panlungsod or legislative body. The council has 13 members which are composed of ten councilors, one ex officio member elected from the ranks of barangay (neighborhood) chairmen, one ex officio member elected from the ranks of Sangguniang Kabataan (youth council) chairmen and one presiding officer. The Vice-mayor of the city is the presiding officer of the council, who is elected citywide.

The council is responsible for creating laws and ordinances under the city's jurisdiction. The mayor can veto proposed bills, but the council can override it with a two-thirds supermajority.

The council meets at the SP Session Hall inside Dapitan Government Center for their regular sessions.

== Powers, duties and functions ==
The Sangguniang Panlungsod, as the legislative body of the city, is mandated by the Local Government Code of 1991 to:

- Enact ordinances;
- Approve resolutions;
- Appropriate funds for the general welfare of the city and its inhabitants; and
- Ensure the proper exercise of the corporate powers of the city as provided for under Section 22 of the Local Government Code.

Furthermore, the following duties and functions are relegated to the Sangguniang Panlungsod:

- Approve ordinances and pass resolutions necessary for an efficient and effective city government;
- Generate and maximize the use of resources and revenues for the development plans, program objectives and priorities of the city as provided for under section 18 of the Local Government Code of 1991, with particular attention to agro-industrial development and citywide growth and progress;
- Enact ordinances granting franchises and authorizing the issuance of permits or licenses, upon such conditions and for such purposes intended to promote the general welfare of the inhabitants of the city but subject to the provisions of Book II of the Local Government Code of 1991;
- Regulate activities relative to the use of land, buildings, and structures within the city in order to promote the general welfare of its inhabitants;
- Approve ordinances which shall ensure the efficient and effective delivery of the basic services and facilities as provided for under Section 17 of the Local Government Code; and
- Exercise such other powers and perform such other duties and functions as may be prescribed by law or ordinance.

== Membership ==
Each of Dapitan's councilor elects ten members of the council. In plurality-at-large voting, a voter may vote for up to ten candidates and the candidates with the ten highest numbers of votes are elected. Barangay and SK chairs throughout the city each elect a representative to the council, for a total of 12 councilors. City-council elections are synchronized with other elections in the country, which have been held on the second Monday of May every third year since 1992.

2025 - 2028 membership

These are the members after the 2025 local elections and 2023 barangay and SK elections:

Position	Name	Party
Presiding Officer	Gabriel M. Cad	Lakas
City; Councilors	Raul B. Carreon	Lakas
City; Councilors	Alexandra Judith P. Meily	Lakas
City; Councilors	Ian Francis J. Adasa	Lakas
City; Councilors	Jeneth C. Napigquit-Baje	Lakas
City; Councilors	John D. Empeynado	Lakas
City; Councilors	Bienvenido T. Dini-ay	Lakas
City; Councilors	Dennis A. Tan	Lakas
City; Councilors	Jonathan C. Cadiente	Lakas
City; Councilors	Erasmo J. Bayron	Lakas
City; Councilors	Ruel S. Nadela	Lakas
ABC President	Hamilcar Tacbaya (Banonong)	Nonpartisan
SK Federation President	Lyza G. Salazar (Taguilon)	Nonpartisan
IPMR President	Rey C. Aguilar, Jr.	Nonpartisan

== Officers ==
Position	Officer
Presiding officer	Vice Mayor Gabriel M. Cad
Presiding officer pro tempore	Councilor Raul B. Carreon
Floor leader	Councilor Jeneth C. Napigquit-Baje
1st assistant floor leader	Councilor Alexandra Judith P. Meily
2nd assistant floor leader	Councilor Ian Francis J. Adasa

== Former councils ==
2022-2025 Membership
Position	Name	Party
Presiding Officer	Alfredo A. Sy	APP
City; Councilors	Jezebel A. Balisado	APP
City; Councilors	Divine G. Patilano	APP
City; Councilors	Mitzie A. Dulawan	APP
City; Councilors	Modesta H. Malayao	APP
City; Councilors	Ronie M. Jarapan	Nacionalista
City; Councilors	Joseph Ryan A. Agolong	APP
City; Councilors	Noel B. Sardane	Nacionalista
City; Councilors	Claver A. Pajaren	Nacionalista
City; Councilors	Ludivico E. Hamoy	APP
City; Councilors	Chembeelyn A. Balucan (Note: Balucan took over from Tarcisio G. Bayron, ranked 8th in the 2022 elections, who died on June 2, 2022 before assuming the post.)	Nacionalista
ABC President	Hamilcar Tacbaya (Banonong)	Nonpartisan
SK Federation President	Lyza G. Salazar (Taguilon)	Nonpartisan

2019-2022 Membership
Position	Name	Party
Presiding Officer	Jimmy Patrick Israel B. Chan (Note: Elected in 2019 under the Nacionalista Party/Aggrupation of Parties for Progress alliance.)	PDP–Laban
City; Councilors	Dug Christopher B. Mah	APP
City; Councilors	Javert Greg G. Hamoy	PDP–Laban
City; Councilors	Amalou R. Tumapon - Monroyo	APP
City; Councilors	Angelica J. Carreon	Nacionalista
City; Councilors	Adora H. Recamara	APP
City; Councilors	Alexander E. Estacio	APP
City; Councilors	Gabriel M. Cad	PDP–Laban
City; Councilors	Ronie M. Jarapan	Nacionalista
City; Councilors	Divine G. Patilano	Nacionalista
City; Councilors	Jezebel A. Balisado	PDP–Laban
ABC President	Felix P. Tacbaya (Masidlakon)	Nonpartisan
SK Federation President	Mary Ann C. Rendon (Taguilon)	Nonpartisan

2016-2019 Membership
Position	Name	Party
Presiding Officer	Ruben E. Cad	Nacionalista
City; Councilors	Jimmy Patrick Israel B. Chan	Nacionalista
City; Councilors	Alemarlou B. Dagpin	UNA
City; Councilors	Edna C. Abad	Nacionalista
City; Councilors	Adora H. Recamara	Nacionalista
City; Councilors	Noel B. Sardane	Nacionalista
City; Councilors	Dug Christopher B. Mah	Independent
City; Councilors	Jasmin Z. Hamoy	Nacionalista
City; Councilors	Alexander E. Estacio	Nacionalista
City; Councilors	Amalou R. Tumapon-Monroyo	Nacionalista
City; Councilors	Roque T. Sapalleda	Nacionalista

2013-2016 Membership
Position	Name	Party
Presiding Officer	Ruben E. Cad	UNA
City; Councilors	Jimmy Patrick Israel B. Chan	UNA
City; Councilors	Edna C. Abad	UNA
City; Councilors	Adora H. Recamara	UNA
City; Councilors	Alemarlou B. Dagpin	UNA
City; Councilors	Uldarico D. Calasang	UNA
City; Councilors	Noel B. Sardane	UNA
City; Councilors	Hermilo R. Hamak	UNA
City; Councilors	Alexander E. Estacio	UNA
City; Councilors	Amalou R. Tumapon	UNA
City; Councilors	Dug Christopher B. Mah	UNA

2010-2013 Membership
Position	Name	Party
Presiding Officer	Patri B. Chan	Lakas–Kampi
City; Councilors	Ruben E. Cad	Lakas–Kampi
City; Councilors	Apple Marie A. Agolong	Lakas–Kampi
City; Councilors	Joven H. Zamora	Lakas–Kampi
City; Councilors	Randy B. Cabasag	Nacionalista
City; Councilors	Efren Q. Jamolod	Nacionalista
City; Councilors	Noel B. Sardane	Lakas–Kampi
City; Councilors	Wendelin D. Dini-ay	Lakas–Kampi
City; Councilors	Cresencio N. Palpagan Jr.	Lakas–Kampi
City; Councilors	Mercy A. Fernandez	Lakas–Kampi
City; Councilors	Rosalina G. Jalosjos-Johnson	Lakas–Kampi

2007-2010 Membership
Position	Name	Party
Presiding Officer	Patri B. Chan	KAMPI
City; Councilors	Pete T. Zamora	KAMPI
City; Councilors	Randy B. Cabasag	KAMPI
City; Councilors	Apple Marie A. Agolong	KAMPI
City; Councilors	Ruben E. Cad	KAMPI
City; Councilors	Hermogenes S. Balisado	KAMPI
City; Councilors	Efren Q. Jamolod	KAMPI
City; Councilors	Artemio A. Nielo	KAMPI
City; Councilors	Emilio Adaza Jacinto	KAMPI
City; Councilors	Arnulfo L. Cadano	KAMPI
City; Councilors	Visitacion T. Olario	KAMPI

2004-2007 Membership
Position	Name	Party
Presiding Officer	Patri B. Chan	PMP
City; Councilors	Pete T. Zamora	PDSP
City; Councilors	Hermogenes S. Balisado	PDSP
City; Councilors	Randy Cabasag	PDSP
City; Councilors	Apple Marie A. Agolong	PDSP
City; Councilors	Visitacion T. Olario	PDSP
City; Councilors	Alexander C. Yorong	PDSP
City; Councilors	Artemio A. Nielo	PDSP
City; Councilors	Emilio Adaza Jacinto	PDSP
City; Councilors	Efren Q. Jamolod	PDSP
City; Councilors	Arnulfo L. Cadano	PDSP
ABC President	Rene B. Galleposo, Sr.	Nonpartisan
SK Federation President	Lee C. Abad	Nonpartisan

2001-2004 Membership
Position	Name	Party
Presiding Officer	Alfredo A. Sy	Lakas
City; Councilors	Patri B. Chan	PDSP
City; Councilors	Beda A. Carreon	PDSP
City; Councilors	Alexander C. Yorong	PMP
City; Councilors	Crisostomo C. Empeynado	LDP
City; Councilors	Artemio A. Nielo	PDSP
City; Councilors	Hermogenes S. Balisado	LDP
City; Councilors	Arnulfo L. Cadano	PDSP
City; Councilors	Sean A. Acaylar	Lakas
City; Councilors	Nemesio L. Etcubañas	Lakas
City; Councilors	Visitacion T. Olario	Lakas
ABC President	Rene B. Galleposo, Sr.	Nonpartisan
SK Federation President	Lee C. Abad	Nonpartisan

1998-2001 Membership
Position	Name
Presiding Officer	Alfredo A. Sy
City; Councilors	Lernito J. Abila
City; Councilors	Ricardo S. Inding
City; Councilors	Beda A. Carreon
City; Councilors	Gugma S. Chiong
City; Councilors	Martin J. Cinco
City; Councilors	Ian Francis J. Adaza
City; Councilors	Joven H. Zamora
City; Councilors	Patri B. Chan
City; Councilors	Alexander C. Yorong
City; Councilors	Agapito J. Cardino
ABC President	Pio T. Galleposo
SK Federation President	Frenalyn C. Jamolod

== See also ==
- Dapitan
- 2019 Zamboanga del Norte local elections
