= Marlo Bancoro =

Filipino politician (born 1974)

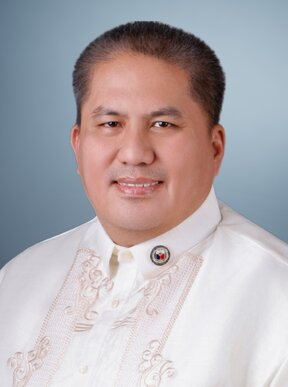
- Official portrait, 2025

Member of the Philippine House of Representatives from Zamboanga Sibugay's 1st district
- Incumbent
- Assumed office June 30, 2025
- Preceded by: WIlter Palma

Member of the Zamboanga Sibugay Provincial Board from the 1st district
- In office June 30, 2022 – June 30, 2025

Personal details
- Born: Marlo Cantancio Bancoro; September 25, 1974 (age 51) Malangas, Zamboanga del Sur (now Zamboanga Sibugay), Philippines
- Party: PFP (since 2024)
- Other political affiliations: LDP (2021–2024)
- Spouse: Ritzi A. Bancoro
- Education: Misamis University
- Occupation: Politician, lawyer, businessman
- Nickname: Atty. Marlo

Marlo Cantancio Bancoro (born September 25, 1974) is a Filipino politician, lawyer, and businessman from the province of Zamboanga Sibugay in the Philippines. He is currently serving as the incumbent Representative for Zamboanga Sibugay's 1st congressional district since 2025. He previously served as a member of the Zamboanga Sibugay Provincial Board from the same district from 2022 to 2025.

== Early life ==
Bancoro was born on September 25, 1974 in Malangas, Zamboanga del Norte (now Zamboanga Sibugay).

== Political career ==
=== Board member (2022 - 2025) ===
Bancoro ran for Sangguniang Panlalawigan of Zamboanga Sibugay's 1st congressional district during the 2022 elections under Laban ng Demokratikong Pilipino, he placed in 5th place and gained a seat.

=== House of Representatives (2025 - present) ===
Bancoro ran for the House of Representatives during the 2025 elections under Partido Federal ng Pilipinas and defeated incumbent representative and former Governor of Zamboanga Sibugay, Wilter Palma of Lakas–CMD. Bancoro supported House Speaker Martin Romualdez and became part of the Majority Bloc.

== Electoral history ==
Electoral history of Marlo Bancoro
Year	Office	Party	Votes received				Result
Year	Office	Party	Total	%	P.	Swing	Result
2022	Board Member (Zamboanga Sibugay)	LDP	57,026	10.77%	5th	—N/a	Won
2025	Representative (Zamboanga Sibugay-1st)	PFP	81,915	55.98%	1st	—N/a	Won

== Personal life ==
Bancoro's wife is Doctor. Ritzi A. Bancoro.
