= Deh-e Malang =

Deh-e Malang ده ملنگ
- Village
- Location within Iran
- Coordinates: 31°09′27″N 61°43′51″E
- Country: Iran
- Province: Sistan and Baluchestan
- County: Hirmand
- Bakhsh: Central
- Rural District: Margan

Population (2006)
  - Total: 236
- Time zone: UTC+3:30 (IRST)

Deh-e Malang (Persian: ده ملنگ; also known as Malang-e Ḩasan) is a village in Margan Rural District, in the Central District of Hirmand County, Sistan and Baluchestan Province, Iran. At the 2006 census, its population was 236, in 51 families.
