= Malang language =

Malang may refer to:

- Maleng language, a Vietic language of Laos and Vietnam
- Dusun Malang language, a language spoken by the Dusun people of Borneo
