= Margosatubig =

Municipality in Zamboanga del Sur, Philippines

Margosatubig Margos
- Municipality
- Municipality of Margosatubig
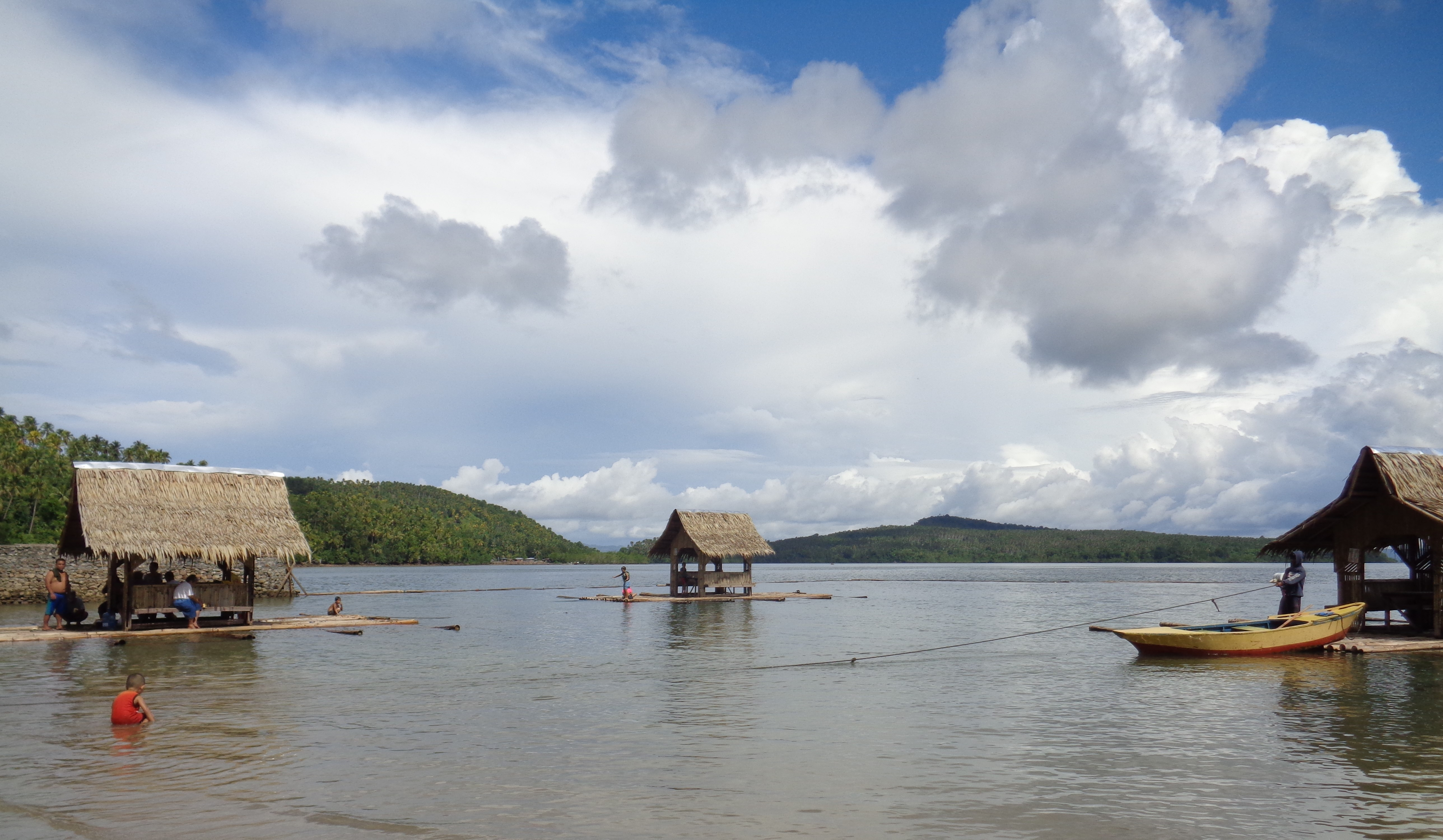
- Rodolfo's Beach Resort with Igat Island

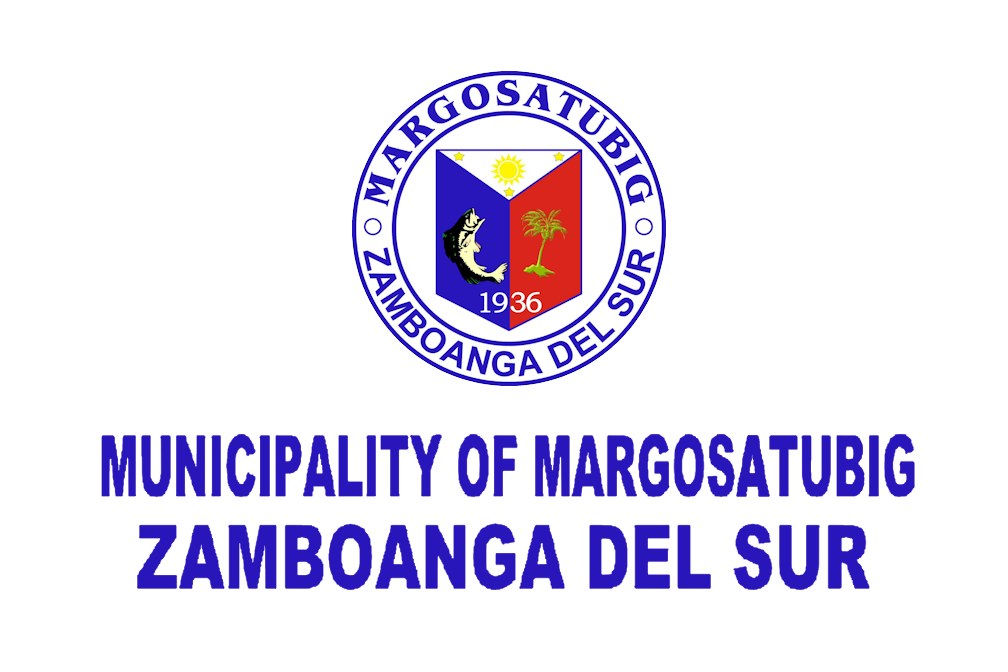
- Flag Seal

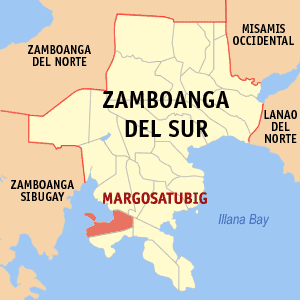
- Map of Zamboanga del Sur with Margosatubig highlighted
- Interactive map of Margosatubig
- Location within the Philippines
- Coordinates: 7°34′42″N 123°09′57″E
- Country: Philippines
- Region: Zamboanga Peninsula
- Province: Zamboanga del Sur
- District: 2nd district
- Founded: December 23, 1936
- Barangays: 17 (see Barangays)

Government
  - Type: Sangguniang Bayan
  - Mayor: Alejandro E. Agua III
  - Vice Mayor: Roldan T. Aluyen
  - Representative: Leonardo L. Babasa Jr.
  - Municipal Council: Members: Edwin A. Leong; Rodentor B. Saavedra; Jonaire C. Andujar; Ricky C. Golez; Roldan T. Aluyen; Ruby S. Albaracin; Ian Kevin D. Cortez; Celso A. Oliveros
  - Electorate: 22,207 voters (2025)

Area
  - Total: 111.69 km^{2} (43.12 sq mi)
- Elevation: 105 m (344 ft)
- Highest elevation: 421 m (1,381 ft)
- Lowest elevation: 0 m (0 ft)

Population (2024 census)
  - Total: 36,025
  - Density: 322.54/km^{2} (835.39/sq mi)
  - Households: 8,611

Economy
  - Income class: 2nd municipal income class
  - Poverty incidence: 34.69% (2023)
  - Revenue: ₱ 186.6 million (2024)
  - Assets: ₱ 869.7 million (2024)
  - Expenditure: ₱ 81.53 million (2024)
  - Liabilities: ₱ 323.8 million (2024)

Service provider
  - Electricity: Zamboanga del Sur 1 Electric Cooperative (ZAMSURECO 1)
- Time zone: UTC+8 (PST)
- ZIP code: 7035
- PSGC: 0907317000
- IDD : area code: +63 (0)62
- Native languages: Subanon; Cebuano; Chavacano; Tagalog; Maguindanaon
- Website: www.margosatubig.gov.ph

Margosatubig, officially the Municipality of Margosatubig (Cebuano: Lungsod sa Margosatubig; Subanen: Benwa Margosatubig; Maguindanaon: Inged nu Margusatubig, Jawi: ايڠد نو مرݢوستوبݢ; Chavacano: Municipalidad de Margosatubig; Tagalog: Bayan ng Margosatubig), is a municipality in the province of Zamboanga del Sur, Philippines. According to the 2024 census, it has a population of 36,025 people.

== History ==
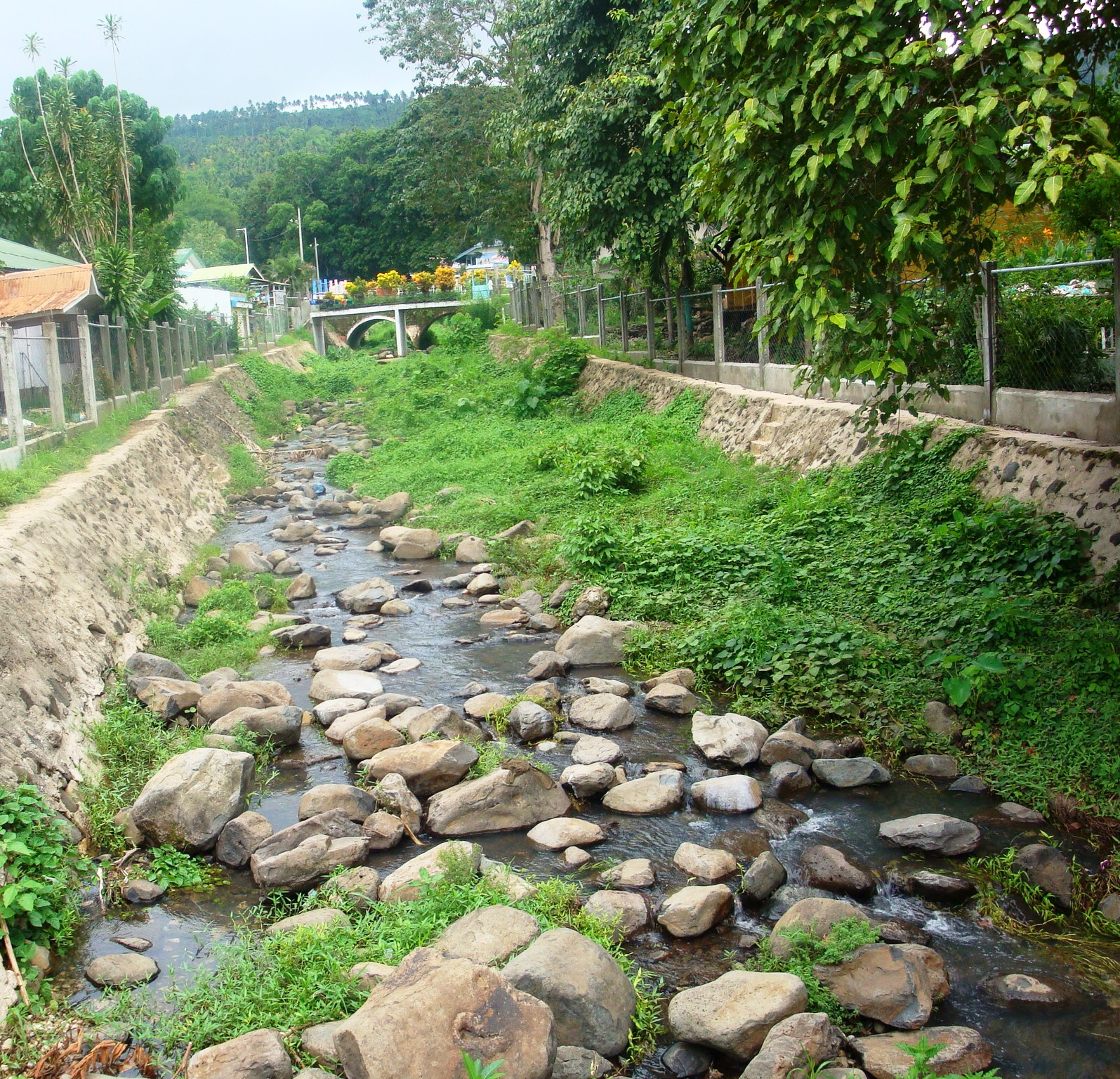
Center River of Margosatubig

The Subanens were believed to be the first people to have settled in this land, right near the swift flowing river that now traverse the Margosatubig Pilot School and Guiwan district. “Malagus Tubig” was the original name of the town, which was taken after the swift river current that kept changing its course towards the mouth of Dumanquilas Bay. In the 16th century, the Spaniards arrived and found that its bay is a natural refuge from bad weather for their ships. Soon it became their choice settlement changing Malagus Tubig (Marugusaig) to its present name Margosatubig. They built a huge stone fort on top of a hill that served as their bastion against Moro pirates who used to raid the settlements along the Dumanquillas Bay and its vicinity. The fort was known as Cotta Heights. In 1963, it was demolished and is now the site of Pax High School. The Spaniards reigned for years and left as their heritage most evidently, the Chavacano dialect. Suffice it to say that more than a hundred years ago, Margosatubig already existed as a settlement of migrants and natives in the 20th century.

From 1917 to 1936, Margosatubig stayed as a municipal district of Zamboanga City. During the Commonwealth Government and by virtue Executive Order No. 17 dated December 23, 1936 signed by President Manuel L. Quezon, Margosatubig finally became a regular and distinct municipality with eight original barrios. It can be said that Margosatubig is the oldest town in Zamboanga del Sur; older even than the undivided Province of Zamboanga.

In 1950, the barrios of Punta Flecha, Pitogo, Qugbay, Balong-balong, Libertad and Dumanguilas were transferred to the newly created town of Dimataling

In 1951, through issuances from President Elpidio Quirino, twenty barrios were organized into separate municipality of Malangas; while ten more were also separated for the creation of Alicia.

The territory was further reduced when, through Batas Pambansa Blg. 173 of 1982, thirteen barangays were separated to create the municipality of Vincenzo Sagun.

Margosatubig, in spite of being a pioneer town, still remained isolated and reachable only by sea craft. In 1976, it was finally opened to the rest of Zamboanga del Sur by an asphalt road connecting it to Pagadian. This was facilitated by the Zamboanga del Sur Development Project undertaken by the Philippine-Australian Development Assistance Programme (PADAP), and its Electrification by ZAMSURECO-1 followed in 1979.

== Geography ==
=== Climate ===
Climate data for Margosatubig, Zamboanga del Sur
Month	Jan	Feb	Mar	Apr	May	Jun	Jul	Aug	Sep	Oct	Nov	Dec	Year
Mean daily maximum °C (°F)	31 (88)	31 (88)	32 (90)	32 (90)	31 (88)	30 (86)	29 (84)	29 (84)	29 (84)	29 (84)	30 (86)	31 (88)	30 (87)
Mean daily minimum °C (°F)	21 (70)	21 (70)	22 (72)	23 (73)	24 (75)	24 (75)	24 (75)	24 (75)	24 (75)	24 (75)	23 (73)	22 (72)	23 (73)
Average precipitation mm (inches)	22 (0.9)	18 (0.7)	23 (0.9)	24 (0.9)	67 (2.6)	120 (4.7)	132 (5.2)	156 (6.1)	119 (4.7)	124 (4.9)	54 (2.1)	24 (0.9)	883 (34.6)
Average rainy days	9.4	9.1	11.5	11.9	20.1	22.5	22.4	23.2	21.5	22.2	15.7	11.5	201
Source: Meteoblue

=== Barangays ===
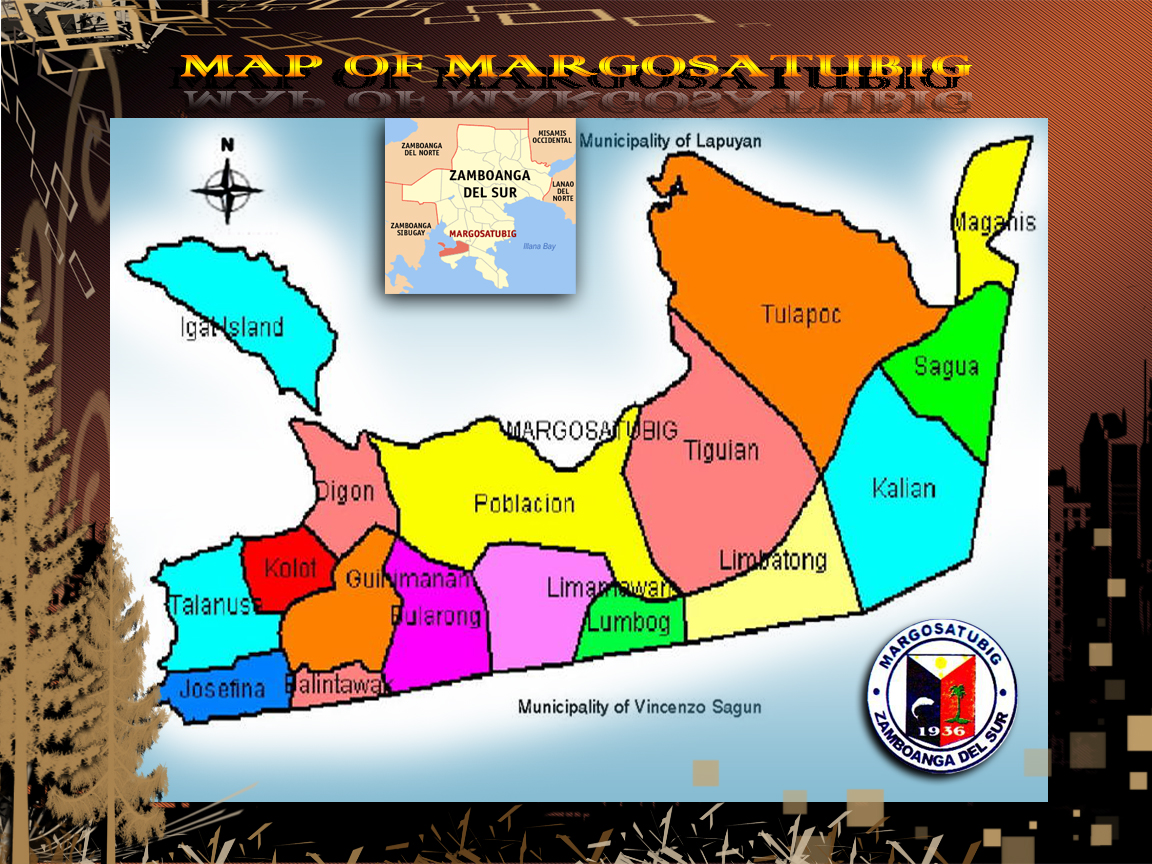
Map of Margosatubig

Margosatubig is politically subdivided into 17 barangays. Each barangay consists of puroks while some have sitios.

- Balintawak
- Bularong
- Digon
- Guinimanan
- Igat Island
- Josefina
- Kalian
- San Roque (Kolot)
- Limamawan
- Limbatong
- Lumbog
- Magahis
- Poblacion
- Sagua
- Talanusa
- Tiguian
- Tulapok

== Demographics ==
Population census of Margosatubig
Year	Pop.	±% p.a.
1918	7,598	—
1939	23,536	+5.53%
1948	28,587	+2.18%
1960	25,052	−1.09%
1970	34,413	+3.22%
1975	32,309	−1.26%
1980	37,781	+3.18%
1990	28,747	−2.70%
1995	29,597	+0.55%
2000	34,461	+3.32%
2007	34,939	+0.19%
2010	35,596	+0.68%
2015	37,873	+1.19%
2020	38,660	+0.43%
2024	36,025	−1.68%
Source: Philippine Statistics Authority

== Economy ==
Poverty incidence of Margosatubig (%)

Source: Philippine Statistics Authority

== Education ==
=== Schools ===
- Margosatubig Regional Pilot School
- Pax High School
