= Malang Shahwala =

- village
- Location in Punjab, India Malang Shahwala (India)
- Coordinates: 31.062909°N 75.0757157°E
- Country: India
- State: Punjab
- District: Firozpur
- Tehsil: Zira
- Elevation: 210 m (690 ft)

Population (2011)
  - Total: 331
- Time zone: UTC+5:30 (IST)
- 2011 census code: 34249

Malang Shahwala is a village in the Firozpur district of Punjab, India. It is located in the Zira tehsil.

== Demographics ==
According to the 2011 census of India, Malang Shahwala had 62 households. The effective literacy rate (i.e. the literacy rate of population older than 6 years) was 67.8%.

Demographics (2011 Census)
	Total	Male	Female
Population	331	178	153
Children aged below 6 years	36	27	9
Scheduled caste	30	15	15
Scheduled tribe	0	0	0
Literates	200	108	92
Workers (all)	99	92	7
Main workers (total)	98	92	6
Main workers: Cultivators	71	70	1
Main workers: Agricultural labourers	11	8	3
Main workers: Household industry workers	0	0	0
Main workers: Other	16	14	2
Marginal workers (total)	1	0	1
Marginal workers: Cultivators	1	0	1
Marginal workers: Agricultural labourers	0	0	0
Marginal workers: Household industry workers	0	0	0
Marginal workers: Others	0	0	0
Non-workers	232	86	146
