= Ziarat-e Malang =

Ziarat-e Malang زيارت ملنگ
- Village
- Location within Iran
- Coordinates: 27°46′29″N 58°21′18″E
- Country: Iran
- Province: Kerman
- County: Rudbar-e Jonubi
- Bakhsh: Jazmurian
- Rural District: Jazmurian

Population (2006)
  - Total: 225
- Time zone: UTC+3:30 (IRST)

Ziarat-e Malang (Persian: زيارت ملنگ, also Romanized as Zīārat-e Malang) is a village in Jazmurian Rural District, Jazmurian District, Rudbar-e Jonubi County, Kerman Province, Iran. At the 2006 census, its population was 225, in 49 families.
