= Malangas =

Municipality in Zamboanga Sibugay, Philippines

- Municipality
- Municipality of Malangas
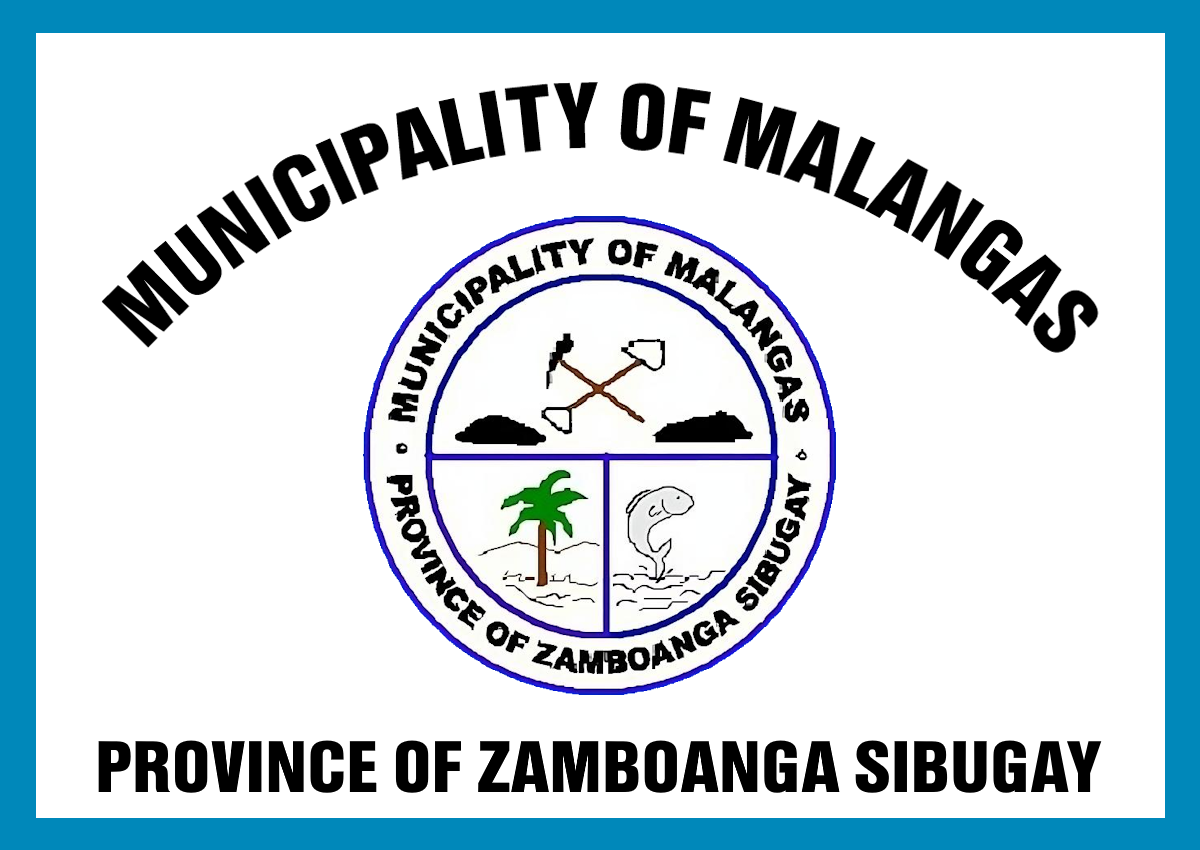
- Flag Seal

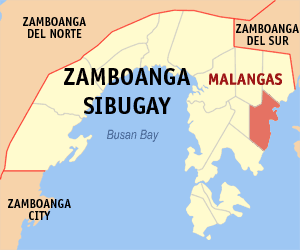
- Map of Zamboanga Sibugay with Malangas highlighted
- Interactive map of Malangas
- Location within the Philippines
- Coordinates: 7°37′54″N 123°01′56″E
- Country: Philippines
- Region: Zamboanga Peninsula
- Province: Zamboanga Sibugay
- District: 1st district
- Founded: July 23, 1951
- Barangays: (see Barangays)

Government
  - Type: Sangguniang Bayan
  - Mayor: Anna Florence C. Yambao
  - Vice Mayor: Marcelo M. Baquial Jr.
  - Representative: Marlo Bancoro
  - Municipal Council: Members: Loreto G. Banquiao; Melba L. Arnuza; Eduardo N. Cuizon; Ronelio G. Luceño; Rogelio C. Evalaroza; Alonto A. Datukali; Arlene C. Saavedra; Carnain P. Tampipi
  - Electorate: 22,123 voters (2025)

Area
  - Total: 235.53 km^{2} (90.94 sq mi)
- Elevation: 47 m (154 ft)
- Highest elevation: 296 m (971 ft)
- Lowest elevation: −2 m (−6.6 ft)

Population (2024 census)
  - Total: 33,194
  - Density: 140.93/km^{2} (365.02/sq mi)
  - Households: 7,971

Economy
  - Income class: 1st municipal income class
  - Poverty incidence: 17.47% (2023)
  - Revenue: ₱ 235.6 million (2024)
  - Assets: ₱ 942.9 million (2024)
  - Expenditure: ₱ 92.98 million (2024)
  - Liabilities: ₱ 275.4 million (2024)

Service provider
  - Electricity: Zamboanga del Sur 2 Electric Cooperative (ZAMSURECO 2)
- Time zone: UTC+8 (PST)
- ZIP code: 7038
- PSGC: 0908308000
- IDD : area code: +63 (0)62
- Native languages: Subanon; Cebuano; Chavacano; Tagalog; Maguindanaon
- Website: www.malangassibugay.gov.ph

Malangas, officially the Municipality of Malangas (Cebuano: Lungsod sa Malangas; Filipino (Tagalog): Bayan ng Malangas; Maguindanaon: Inged nu Malangas, Jawi: ايڠد نو ملاڠس); Zamboangueño/Chavacano: Municipio de Malangas, is a municipality in the province of Zamboanga Sibugay, Philippines. According to the 2024 census, it has a population of 33,194 people.

The municipality is generally rolling near the shorelines and mountainous in the hinterland with some patches of flat land located within the mangroves near the shorelines. It borders Buug to the north-east; Diplahan to the north-west; Imelda to the west; Margosatubig, Zamboanga del Sur, to the east; and Alicia to the south.

Malangas is the site of coal mining in Western Mindanao area, operated by the Philippine National Oil Company - Exploration Corporation. The coalmine is one of the largest in the country. Its town center nests in a harbor in Dumanquilas Bay, boasts of its twin ports, one for coal, the other for passengers.

== Etymology ==
The name Malangas got its name from a sitio later named Malangas Gamay, probably of Spanish origin. Though the exact origin of “Malangas” is unclear, the word itself might have Spanish origins, probably taken from the word “Malanga” which means “Taro” (Colocasia Esculenta to Botanists) in English (“Taro” is called “Gabi” in Filipino), as the natives of Malangas might have been planting this crops during the time when the Spaniards paid them a visit.

== History ==
The municipality was created through Republic Act No. 654, issued on June 16, 1951, during the leadership of President Elpidio Quirino, upon separation of twenty barrios from Margosatubig in the old province of Zamboanga.

After the partition of Zamboanga, Malangas became part of Zamboanga del Sur, and its territory was later reduced. In 1956, six barrios and sitios, along with parts of Kabasalan, were separated to establish Siay.

In 1977, Imelda was created, constituting seven barangays, including Sta. Fe which would be the seat of government in the newly-created municipality, detached from Malangas, along with parts of Siay and Alicia.

== Geography ==
The town is Located on the south-eastern tip of Zamboanga Sibugay province. It is bounded on the east by Dumanquilas Bay and south by the Celebes Sea. The total distance from Manila to Malangas, Philippines is 492 miles (792 km). This is equivalent to 792 kilometers or 428 nautical miles (793 km). It is two and a half hours away from Pagadian city, 45 minutes drive from the Provincial capital, and 133 kilometers away from the city of Zamboanga.

Malangas also includes the island of Muyong, having endowed with white sand beaches, and other of uninhabited islands near the shorelines. Mainland area are steeply sloping terrain of hills and mountains. Due to its topography and elevation the town does not experience flooding.

=== Climate ===
Climate data for Malangas, Zamboanga Sibugay
Month	Jan	Feb	Mar	Apr	May	Jun	Jul	Aug	Sep	Oct	Nov	Dec	Year
Mean daily maximum °C (°F)	31 (88)	31 (88)	31 (88)	31 (88)	30 (86)	29 (84)	29 (84)	29 (84)	29 (84)	29 (84)	30 (86)	30 (86)	30 (86)
Mean daily minimum °C (°F)	23 (73)	23 (73)	23 (73)	24 (75)	25 (77)	25 (77)	24 (75)	24 (75)	24 (75)	24 (75)	24 (75)	23 (73)	24 (75)
Average precipitation mm (inches)	61 (2.4)	55 (2.2)	75 (3.0)	81 (3.2)	145 (5.7)	189 (7.4)	189 (7.4)	197 (7.8)	162 (6.4)	181 (7.1)	115 (4.5)	70 (2.8)	1,520 (59.9)
Average rainy days	16.4	15.7	19.1	21.5	26.9	27.1	26.4	25.0	24.2	26.8	23.5	18.7	271.3
Source: Meteoblue

The Municipality of Malangas enjoys a location that is free from the typhoon belt area. March to May is hot and dry, with temperature at 32 to 34 °C (90 to 93 °F), while in June to October is rainy, and November to February is cool, with temperatures ranging from 22 to 28 °C (72 to 82 °F). Average humidity year round is 77%.

=== Barangays ===
Malangas is politically subdivided into 25 barangays. Each barangay consists of puroks while some have sitios.

- Bacao
- Basakbawang
- Bontong
- Camanga
- Candiis
- Catituan
- Dansulao
- Del Pilar
- Guilawa
- Kigay
- La Dicha
- Lipacan
- Logpond
- Malongon
- Molom
- Mabini
- Overland
- Palalian
- Payag
- Poblacion
- Rebocon
- San Vicente
- Sinusayan
- Tackling
- Tigabon

== Demographics ==
Population census of Malangas
Year	Pop.	±% p.a.
1960	24,733	—
1970	31,394	+2.41%
1975	29,305	−1.37%
1980	20,190	−7.18%
1990	28,957	+3.67%
1995	28,916	−0.03%
2000	29,770	+0.63%
2007	29,834	+0.03%
2010	31,243	+1.69%
2015	33,380	+1.27%
2020	32,022	−0.87%
2024	33,194	+0.87%
Source: Philippine Statistics Authority

The indigenous people of the area now known as Malangas were the Malangeneous.

The large majority of the population of Malangas is Roman Catholic (87%). Other religions represented are Protestant (3%), and Islam (10%).

=== Language ===
The Main language of Malangas is Bisaya. Locals can also speak well in Tagalog and English. English is widely used in education and understood. Other languages of the Philippines are also spoken, mostly between family members, relatives, or neighbors belonging to the same ethnic group. Among these languages, the most spoken include Chavacano languages, Maguindanaon, Tausug and the Subanen.

== Economy ==
Poverty incidence of Malangas (%)

Source: Philippine Statistics Authority

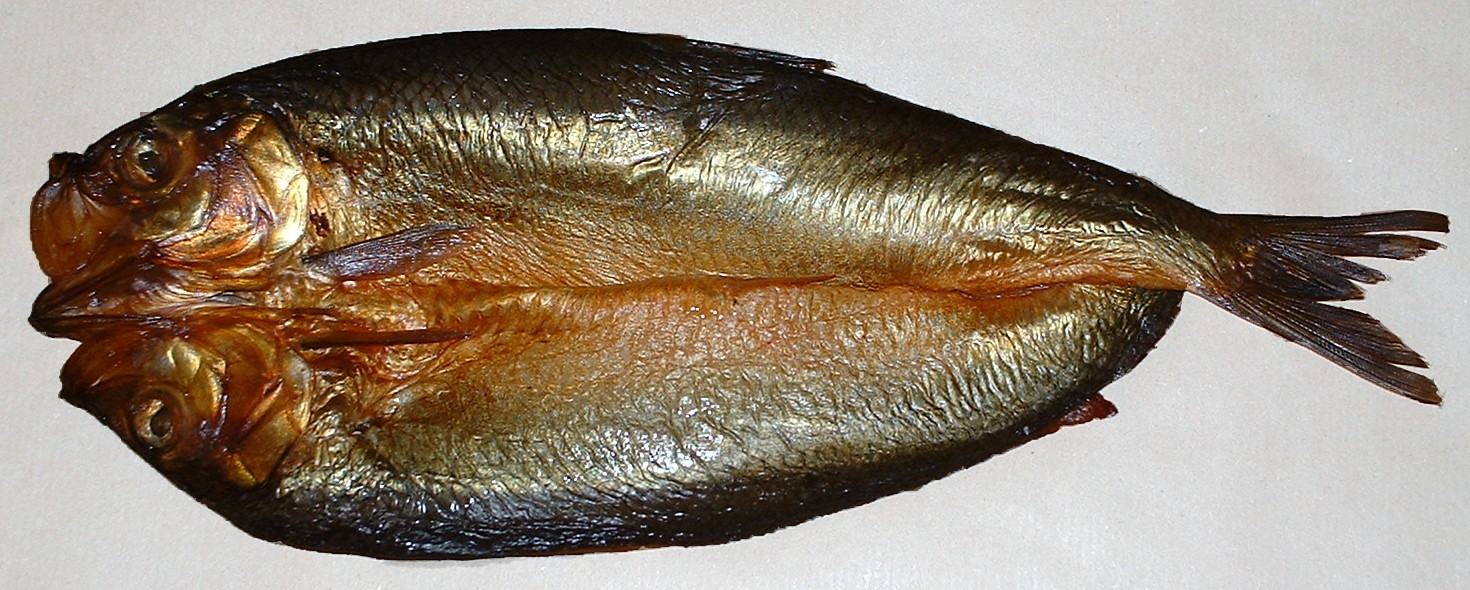
"Pinikas na isda" a variety of dried fish are common in the poblacion market

Coal mining has been in operation in Malangas since the early 1930s, which strengthens the local economy as well as that of the entire province Zamboanga Sibugay. In 1938, the Malangas Coal Reservation was established. Although the scale of the present operations is relatively modest, the production is of considerable national significance. There are relatively large deposits of coal and this estimates to contain nearly 10 million tons of coal (according to Frederick L. Wernstedt, Joseph Earle Spencer) some of which is of coking quality - a small quantity to be sure, but one that gains added significance in light of the general overall shortage of mineral fuels in the Philippines. The present production of Malangas coal is being shipped to the Iligan Industrial area.

The rest of Malangas is still heavily dependent on agriculture and aquaculture, while in the coastal areas there is also commercial fishing.

Manufacturing:

- Rice and Corn Milling
- Coffee Milling

=== Coal mining ===
There are Philippine coals which are of such quality that they can be used by current users without the need for any coal preparation or blending with imported coals. Among these are the coal deposits being mined in Malangas. The PNOC (Philippine National Oil Company) and the TMC its Taiwanese partner operates coal within the Malangas Coal Reservation. It also operates a large-scale coal mine known as the Integrated Little Baguio (ILB) colliery, which is currently the largest semi-mechanized underground coal mine in the country.

In the year 1994, a worst tragedy happened when a huge methane gas explosion ripped through a coal mine tunnel in Malangas town, killing more than 100 people. The blast set off a fireball, which swept through nine kilometers of mines, and setting off other explosives which had been stockpiled inside the tunnel. Ten years later, six miners were killed when a coal tunnel collapsed in Diplahan town.

News about the coal mine in Malangas has been rumored that PNOC-EC may sell mine to San Miguel Corp. According to the news, the Philippine National Oil Company - Exploration Corp. (PNOC-EC) is in talks with diversified conglomerate San Miguel Corp. to sell a coal mine in Mindanao and this is probably in Zamboanga Peninsula where Malangas is located. For 2009, total coal production in Malangas amounted to 91,440 metric tons, a decrease from the 2008 output of 110, 549 metric tons due to major repair and rehabilitation “conducted immediately upon takeover of the mines.” Today, Mining operators are still operating in the coal reservation of the town.

== Tourism ==
Malangas is endowed with several islets that are ideal for resort development. One of these is Isla Muyong, comparable to Buluan island of Ipil. One characteristic that they have in common is their white sand beaches. Others are also sprawled in some of the town's coastline.

The most notable beach in Malangas is the Municipal Government owned beach resort, located in Bunker, the site of the town's coal port. Many people who live in the nearby towns like it because of the proximity of the place.

== Government ==
=== Local government ===
The local council is administered by the mayor, with the assistance of the vice mayor. There is only one representative Sangguniang Kabataan (Youth Council) and Association of Barangay Captains (ABC).

Malangas has been administered by elected and appointed officials since July 23, 1951, with a strong Mayor-council government.

=== Congress representation ===
Malangas belongs to the 1st District of Zamboanga Sibugay. Currently, it is being represented by Marlo Bancoro in the House of Representatives.

=== Elected officials ===
Malangas Municipal Council (2025 - 2028)
Position	Name	Party
Congressman	Marlo C. Bancoro	PFP
Mayor	Anna Florence "Apple" C. Yambao	NP
Vice Mayor	Marcelo "Tata" M. Baquial Jr.	PFP
Councilors	Melba L. Arnuza	PFP
Councilors	Loreto G. Banquiao	PFP
Councilors	Ronelio "Ronie" G. Luceño	PFP
Councilors	Al-Hussein B. Catubig	PFP
Councilors	Fremer K. Bullecer	PFP
Councilors	Alonto A. Datukali	PFP
Councilors	Danny P. Tampipi	PFP
Councilors	Castor "Loloy" M. Madarimot	PFP

== Infrastructure ==
=== Water Supply ===
One of the major problems in Malangas is the water system. Water resources are also less abundant. Almost 90 percent of the population get its water supply from a nearby barangay. But this is not abundant for the population. This explains the water scarcity in the area. While some barangays receive enough water, others experience constant water deficiency most especially in the poblacion area. Lack of access to water is a larger problem in the population anywhere else in the town center. The water supply only runs hourly within the different districts/purok. There are recent government efforts to improve the management of water resources in Malangas but all had failed. As of now, the government is trying to solve the problem to help get the people a good and fine water system.

== Education ==
Malangas is home to one of the satellite campuses of Western Mindanao State University, the state university in western Mindanao region which is ranked sixth among 68 universities all over the country, according to a survey on the Top Academic Institutions in the Philippines conducted by the Commission on Higher Education. Head office of the university is in Zamboanga City The campus is located at the mountain hill of the town viewing the Dumaguillas Bay and neighboring islets.

== See also ==
- Malangas Coal Reservation
