= Malangas Coal Reservation =

Coal mine in Philippines

COC No. 41 - Malangas or the Malangas Coal Reservation is a Coal Reservation in Zamboanga Sibugay, Philippines exploited by the Philippine National Oil Company - Exploration Corporation (PNOC-EC).

PNOC EC operates Coal Operating Contract (COC) 41 within the Malangas Coal Reservation in Zamboanga Sibugay, straddling portions of the municipalities of Malangas, Diplahan, and Imelda. PNOC EC operates a large-scale coal mine known as the Integrated Little Baguio (ILB) colliery, which is currently the largest semi-mechanized underground coal mine in the country. As holder of the COC, the company also supervises the mining operations of various small-scale coal miners.

For 2008, total coal production in COC 41 amounted to 110.54 thousand tonnes (108,790 long tons; 121,850 short tons). The decrease in coal production from the 2007 output can be attributed to the major repair and rehabilitation activities that were undertaken at the ILB colliery.

Also in 2008, the Phase 1 exploration drilling contract was awarded and a Certificate of Non Coverage was obtained for the Lumbog area. Equipment mobilization, site preparation, drilling and core logging, as well as sampling and laboratory analysis were also completed. Studies on mine feasibility and detailed engineering and design were also started during the year.

PNOC EC also conducted geological investigation, drilling and reserve evaluation in the Shaft 3 area. For the Malongon area, the Company completed reconnaissance mapping, map preparation and preliminary assessment. Data on geology and coal resources were updated, and preliminary exploration activities were started.

== See also ==
- Malangas, Zamboanga Sibugay
