= Aggrupation of Parties for Prosperity =

Political party in the Philippines (e. 2009)

- Leader: Bullet Jalosjos
- Founder: Romeo Jalosjos Sr.
- Founded: 2009; 17 years ago
- Headquarters: Dapitan, Philippines
- Ideology: Regionalism
- National affiliation: UniTeam (2021-2024); HNP (2018–2021); PGP (2016); UNA (2012-2015); Lakas Kampi CMD (2009-2010); Nacionalista (2022-2024); PFP (2024-present)
- House of Representatives: 0 / 3 (Zamboanga del Norte seats only)
- Provincial governors: 0 / 3
- Provincial vice governors: 0 / 3
- Provincial board members: 5 / 30

Aggrupation of Parties for Prosperity, commonly known as APP and formerly known as Aggrupation of Parties for Progress, is a local political party in the region of Zamboanga Peninsula in the Philippines. It is a political party founded by Romeo Jalosjos Sr. as the Alliance of Parties for Progress based in the province of Zamboanga del Norte.

As of 2018, APP is currently allied with Hugpong ng Pagbabago of Sara Duterte. Most of its candidates are allied with different national parties, notably Nacionalista Party and Nationalist People's Coalition.

== Electoral history ==
=== 2013 local elections ===
Cesar Jalosjos, Zamboanga del Norte's 3rd District representative was fielded for the gubernatorial post with Dapitan vice mayor and former mayor Patri "Jing" Chan running for the vice-gubernatorial post. Both Jalosjos and Chan were defeated by former Dipolog City mayor Berto Uy and Dipolog City Vice Mayor Senen Angeles.

Rolando Yebes, a member of this party, was term-limited being Provincial Governor and was fielded for the post of Second District Representative. He was defeated by incumbent Representative Rosendo "Dodoy" Labadlabad.

=== 2016 local elections ===
Rolando Yebes, Zamboanga del Norte's former Provincial Governor was fielded to run and reclaim his gubernatorial post with former 2nd District Board Member Ricky Mejorada running for the vice-gubernatorial post. Both Yebes and Mejorada were defeated by incumbent Governor Berto Uy and Vice Governor Senen Angeles.

=== 2019 local elections ===
In 2018, the party created an alliance with Hugpong ng Pagbabago of Sara Duterte.

Bullet Jalosjos, Zamboanga del Norte's 1st District representative (who is allied with the Nacionalista Party) was fielded for the gubernatorial post with Peter Dominic "Britz" Adaza Hamoy running for the vice-gubernatorial post. Both Jalosjos and Adaza Hamoy were defeated by incumbent Governor Berto Uy and Vice Governor Senen Angeles.

=== 2022 local elections ===
Rosalina Jalosjos, Dapitan's mayor who is a party member and allied with the Nacionalista Party, was fielded for the gubernatorial post with former governor Rolando "Lando" Yebes running for the vice-gubernatorial post. Jalosjos won in the gubernatorial race against former Dipolog City mayor Evelyn Uy, but Yebes was defeated in the vice gubernatorial race.

=== 2025 local elections ===
The APP allied with Partido Federal ng Pilipinas while maintaining their alliance with the Nacionalista Party. Incumbent Dapitan City mayor Bullet Jalosjos ran for the gubernatorial post with Zamboanga del Norte provincial administrator Wilberth "Jojo" Magallanes as their running mate. Still, both were defeated by incumbent Dipolog City mayor Darel Dexter Uy and reelectionist Vice Governor Julius Napigquit. All three of their congressional candidates—Piñan town mayor Cely Jalosjos-Carreon, Jalosjos-ally Aurelio "Tata" Monteclaro, and former 3rd district congressman Cesar Jalosjos—were defeated by incumbent 1st district representative Pinpin Uy, political neophyte Irene "Ate Ai" Labadlabad, and incumbent 3rd district representative Ian Amatong respectively. Incumbent Zamboanga del Norte Governor Rosalina Jalosjos and all but one of her candidates failed to win the local elections in Dipolog, while incumbent Dawo, Dapitan City punong barangay and ex-officio Board Member Sushmita "Maita" Jalosjos and her slate failed to keep their hold in Dapitan.

== Electoral performance ==
=== Governor ===
Election	Candidate	Number of votes	Share of votes	Outcome of election
2013	Cesar Jalosjos	78,029	44.28	Lost
2016	Rolando Yebes	158,010	40.08	Lost
2019	Bullet Jalosjos	216,517	46.29	Lost
2022	Rosalina Jalosjos	249,956	N/A	Won
2025	Bullet Jalosjos	226,863	N/A	Lost

== Notable members ==
- Seth Frederick "Bullet" Jalosjos - Zamboanga del Norte 1st District Representative (2010-2019); city mayor of Dapitan (2022–present)
- Romeo "Jon-jon" Jalosjos, Jr. - Zamboanga del Norte 1st District Representative (2019–2023); Zamboanga Sibugay 2nd District Representative (2010-2013)
- Svetlana "Lana" Jalosjos-de Leon - Baliangao municipal mayor (2010-2013)
- Maria Bella Javier - Zamboanga Sibugay 2nd District Board Member (2019–Present)
- Maria Esperanza Corazon "Mec" Rillera - Zamboanga Sibugay 2nd District Board Member (2016–Present)
- George Castillo - Zamboanga Sibugay 2nd District Board Member (2016–Present)
