= 2025 Zamboanga del Norte local elections =

Part of the 2025 Philippine general election

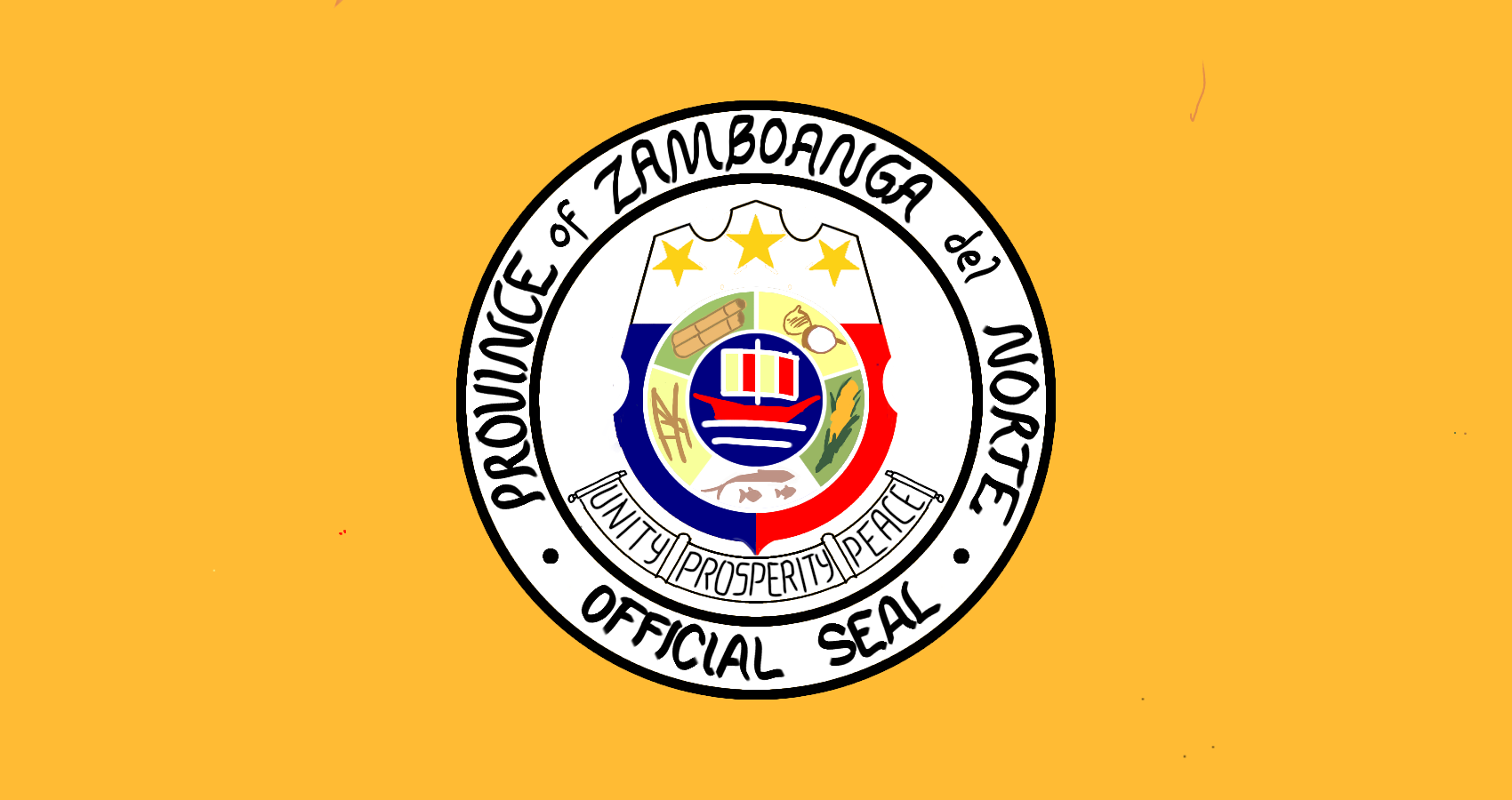
- Gubernatorial election
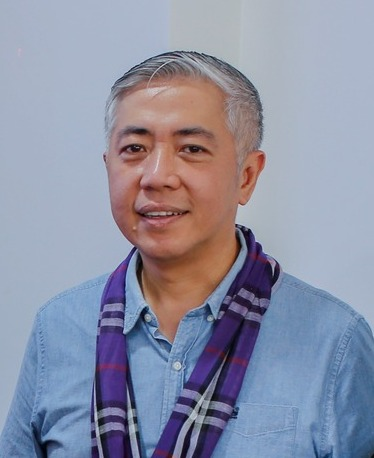

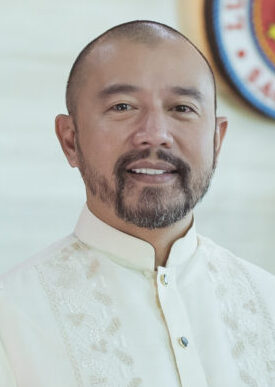
Candidate	Darel Uy	Bullet Jalosjos
Party	Lakas	PFP
Running mate	Julius Napigquit	Gaw Jojo Magallanes
Popular vote	366,165	226,863
Percentage	61.22%	37.39%
Governor before election
Rosalina Jalosjos
PFP
Elected Governor
Darel Uy
Lakas
- Vice gubernatorial election
	Lakas	PFP
Candidate	Julius Napigquit	Wilberth Magallanes
Party	Lakas	PFP
Popular vote	348,789	196,106
Percentage	64.01%	35.99%
Vice Governor before election
Julius Napigquit
Lakas
Elected Vice Governor
Julius Napigquit
Lakas

Local elections were held in the province of Zamboanga del Norte of the Philippines, on May 12, 2025 as part of the 2025 general election. Voters will select candidates for all local positions: a municipal and city mayor, vice mayor and councilors, as well as members of the Sangguniang Panlalawigan, the governor, vice governor and representatives for the three districts of Zamboanga del Norte.

== Background ==
Incumbent governor Rosalina Jalosjos was elected in 2022 with 256,885 votes and 49.94% narrowly defeating her opponent Evelyn Uy, succeeding the latter's husband Roberto Uy. Jalosjos was eligible to run for a second term but ran for the Dipolog mayorship, her party nominated her nephew and incumbent mayor of Dapitan Seth Frederick "Bullet" Jalosjos for the election.

== Provincial elections ==
All incumbents are marked in italics.

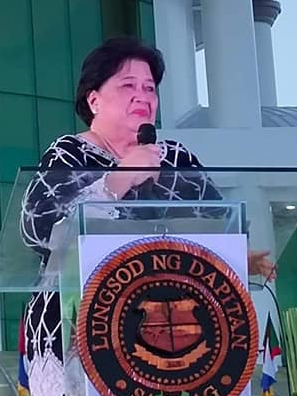
Rosalina Jalosjos (pictured) did not run for re-election

=== Tickets ===
==== Administration coalition ====
Team GWAPO (PFP-Nacionalista-APP)
Position	#	Candidate	Party
Governor	1.	Seth Frederick "Bullet" Jalosjos	PFP
Vice governor	1.	Wilbert "Gaw Jojo" Magallanes	PFP
Representative (1st district)	2.	Cecilia "Cely" Jalosjos Carreon	Nacionalista
Representative (2nd district)	2.	Aurelio "Tata" Monteclaro	Nacionalista
Representative (3rd district)	2.	Cesar Jalosjos	Nacionalista
Board member (1st district)	1.	Jezebel "Bing" Balisado	PFP
Board member (1st district)	4.	Mark Gerald Magsalay	PFP
Board member (2nd district)	5.	Beverly Labadlabad	PFP
Board member (2nd district)	6.	Uldarico "Attorney Ricky" Mejorada, II	PFP
Board member (2nd district)	7.	Clyde Naong	PFP
Board member (2nd district)	8.	Jasmin Pinsoy-Lagutin	PFP
Board member (3rd district)	1.	Ivan Patrick "Attorney Ang" Ang	Nacionalista
Board member (3rd district)	4.	Franco Angelo "Conkee" Buctuan	PFP
Board member (3rd district)	6.	Constantino "Boy" Soriano, Jr.	Nacionalista

==== Primary opposition coalition ====
Team I Lab U (Lakas-Liberal-Kusog Kalambuan)
Position	#	Candidate	Party
Governor	3.	Darel Dexter Uy	Lakas
Vice governor	2.	Julius Napigquit	Lakas
Representative (1st district)	4.	Roberto "Pinpin" Uy, Jr.	Lakas
Representative (2nd district)	1.	Irene "Ate Ai" Labadlabad	Lakas
Representative (3rd district)	1.	Adrian Michael "Ian" Amatong	Liberal
Board member (1st district)	2.	Jimmy Patrick Israel "Jimboy" Chan	Lakas
Board member (1st district)	5.	Dario Mandantes	Lakas
Board member (2nd district)	1.	Dante Bagarinao	Lakas
Board member (2nd district)	3.	Peter "Atornipeter" Co	Lakas
Board member (2nd district)	4.	Michael "Jojo" Documento, II	Lakas
Board member (2nd district)	9.	Richard "Chady" Yebes	Lakas
Board member (3rd district)	2.	Kay Marie Bolando	Lakas
Board member (3rd district)	3.	Jeff Raymund "JR" Brillantes	Liberal
Board member (3rd district)	5.	Leo Nicanor "Atty. Leo" Mejorada	Liberal
Board member (3rd district)	7.	Venus Uy	Lakas

==== Other candidates ====
Candidates not in tickets
Position	#	Candidate	Party
Governor	2.	Javier Obnimaga	Independent
Representative (1st district)	1.	December Gay "Cay" Carreon	Reporma
Representative (1st district)	3.	Federico "Kuya Jan" Jalosjos	NPC
Board member (1st district)	3.	Wilfredo Jamolod	Independent
Board member (2nd district)	2.	Noel Bandala	Independent

=== Governor ===
Incumbent governor Rosalina Jalosjos was elected in 2022 under the Nacionalista Party, she was eligible for re-election to a second term but opted to run for mayor of Dipolog. Partido Federal ng Pilipinas nominated her nephew and incumbent mayor of Dapitan, Bullet Jalosjos. On his second attempt for the governorship since 2019, Jalosjos faced Lakas–CMD's nominee, Darel Dexter Uy, the incumbent mayor of Dipolog and the son of former governor Roberto and Evelyn Uy. The two faced off one other candidate, Javier Obnimaga.

==== Candidates ====
Declared

- Bullet Jalosjos (PFP), incumbent mayor of Dapitan since 2022
- Javier Obnimaga (Independent), Tribal customary lawyer
- Darel Uy (Lakas), incumbent mayor of Dipolog since 2016

Result

2025 Zamboanga del Norte gubernatorial election
Party	Candidate	Votes	%
Lakas	Darel Dexter Uy	366,165	61.22%
PFP	Seth Frederick "Bullet" Jalosjos	226,863	37.93%
Independent	Javier Obnimaga	5,094	0.85%
Total votes		598,122	100.00%
Lakas gain from PFP			

Results per city and municipality
City or municipality	District	Jalosjos PFP		Uy Lakas		Obnimaga Independent		Valid votes		Over-votes		Under-votes		Turnout		Registered voters
City or municipality	District	Total	%	Total	%	Total	%	Total	%	Total	%	Total	%	Total	%	Registered voters
Baliguian	3rd	5,964	57.57	4,208	40.62	188	1.81	10,360	84.00	123	1.00	1,851	15.00	12,334	80.34	15,352
Dapitan City	1st	32,437	47.7	35,391	52.04	173	0.25	68,001	97.60	327	0.47	1,342	1.93	69,670	92.15	75,602
Dipolog City	2nd	31,101	39.53	47,304	60.12	276	0.35	78,681	97.66	519	0.64	1,366	1.70	80,566	82.01	98,238
Godod	3rd	1,472	19.54	5,995	79.58	66	0.88	7,533	70.55	128	1.20	3,017	28.25	10,678	87.12	12,256
Gutalac	3rd	7,326	33.87	14,032	64.87	272	1.26	21,630	90.63	310	1.30	1,927	8.07	23,867	87.41	27,304
Jose Dalman	2nd	4,619	29.60	10,915	69.95	69	0.44	15,603	93.35	260	1.55	852	5.10	16,715	75.00	22,288
Kalawit	3rd	3,705	31.53	7,798	66.37	246	2.09	11,749	82.73	156	1.10	2,296	16.17	14,201	82.92	17,127
Katipunan	2nd	11,750	44.98	14,251	54.56	121	0.46	26,122	93.76	205	0.74	1,533	5.50	27,860	82.03	33,964
La Libertad	1st	1,730	34.38	3,277	65.12	25	0.50	5,032	88.37	32	0.56	630	11.07	5,694	89.85	6,337
Labason	3rd	7,199	31.05	15,652	67.51	335	1.44	23,186	90.74	321	1.26	2,044	8.00	25,551	77.14	33,125
Leon B. Postigo	3rd	7,286	49.31	7,272	49.21	219	1.48	14,777	86.78	262	1.54	1,990	11.68	17,029	84.26	20,210
Liloy	3rd	7,433	30.98	16,352	68.15	208	0.87	23,993	87.22	245	0.89	3,272	11.89	27,510	84.37	32,607
Manukan	2nd	4,448	22.68	15,059	76.79	104	0.53	19,611	92.68	348	1.64	1,202	5.68	21,161	80.33	26,342
Mutia	1st	2,530	30.66	5,691	68.97	31	0.38	8,252	94.08	36	0.41	483	5.51	8,771	87.47	10,028
Piñan	1st	5,866	46.51	6,676	52.93	70	0.56	12,612	95.17	73	0.55	567	4.28	13,252	88.90	14,906
Polanco	1st	10,004	38.72	15,701	60.77	130	0.50	25,835	94.91	177	0.65	1,208	4.44	27,220	87.69	31,040
President Manuel A. Roxas	2nd	7,481	34.98	13,805	64.55	101	0.47	21,387	92.39	246	1.06	1,515	6.55	23,148	81.08	28,550
Rizal	1st	4,277	35.99	7,556	63.58	52	0.44	11,885	92.05	44	0.34	983	7.61	12,912	90.74	14,229
Salug	3rd	6,363	38.06	10,192	60.97	162	0.97	16,717	83.28	178	0.89	3,179	15.83	20,074	85.67	23,433
Sergio Osmeña Sr.	1st	7,979	43.08	10,382	56.05	161	0.87	18,522	88.87	154	0.74	2,166	10.39	20,842	90.05	23,146
Siayan	2nd	5,625	29.34	13,409	69.93	141	0.74	19,175	85.18	212	0.94	3,124	13.88	22,511	80.19	28,072
Sibuco	3rd	9,108	41.48	12,240	55.75	609	2.77	21,957	85.98	324	1.27	3,256	12.75	25,537	77.10	33,122
Sibutad	1st	5,062	43.66	6,464	55.76	67	0.58	11,593	95.41	98	0.80	460	3.79	12,151	87.19	13,936
Sindangan	2nd	16,044	29.03	38,919	70.41	311	0.56	55,274	92.95	558	0.94	3,637	6.11	59,469	82.02	72,505
Siocon	3rd	12,523	57.68	8,553	39.39	635	2.92	21,711	82.60	192	0.73	4,382	16.67	26,285	86.17	30,503
Sirawai	3rd	2,448	18.08	10,954	80.91	137	1.01	13,539	90.96	162	1.09	1,183	7.95	14,884	79.13	18,809
Tampilisan	3rd	5,083	37.98	8,117	60.64	185	1.38	13,385	87.24	194	1.26	1,765	11.50	15,344	87.63	17,509
Zamboanga del Norte	Province	226,863	37.93	366,165	61.22	5,094	0.85	598,122	91.29	5,884	0.90	51,180	7.81	655,186	83.94	780,540

=== Vice governor ===
Incumbent vice governor Julius Napigquit was elected in 2022 under PDP-Laban, Napigquit ran for re-election to a second term under Lakas–CMD. He faced Partido Federal ng Pilipinas's nominee Gaw Jojo Magallanes.

==== Candidates ====
Declared

- Wilberth Magallanes (PFP), government employee
- Julius Napigquit (Lakas), incumbent vice governor since 2022

Result

2025 Zamboanga del Norte vice gubernatorial election
Party	Candidate	Votes	%
Lakas	Julius Napigquit	348,789	64.01%
PFP	Wilberth "Gaw Jojo" Magallanes	196,106	35.99%
Total votes		544,895	100.00%
Lakas hold			

=== Provincial board ===
2025 Zamboanga del Norte Provincial Board election results summary
Party	Votes	%	+/–	Seats	+/–
Lakas-CMD	869,321	52.27	New	8	+8
Partido Federal ng Pilipinas	461,422	27.75	New	–	0
Liberal Party	201,572	12.12	New	2	+2
Nacionalista Party	126,478	7.61	-24.58	–	-1
Independent	4,241	0.26	-0.1	–	0
Ex officio seats				3	–
Total	1,663,034	100.00	–	13	–

==== 1st district ====
Incumbent Patri "Jing" Chan was term limited, while fellow incumbent Angelica Jalosjos Carreon did not run for reelection. 4 candidates are running for the position: Lakas–CMD nominees Dario Mandates and Jimboy Chan are up against Partido Federal ng Pilipinas nominees Bing Balisado and Mark Gerald Magsalay.

===== Candidates =====
Declared

- Bing Balisado (PFP), incumbent city councilor from Dapitan since 2019
- Jimboy Chan (Lakas), former vice mayor of Dapitan
- Mark Gerald Magsalay (PFP), lawyer
- Dario Mandantes (Lakas), lawyer and former Polanco Sangguniang Bayan member

Withdrew / disqualified

- Wilfredo Jamolod (Independent), teacher

Result

2025 Zamboanga del Norte Provincial Board election from the first district
Party	Candidate	Votes	%
Lakas	Dario Mandantes	80,557	29.28%
Lakas	Jimmy Patrick Israel "Jimboy" Chan	77,296	28.09%
PFP	Jezebel "Bing" Balisado	61,603	22.39%
PFP	Mark Gerald Magsalay	53,535	19.46%
Total votes		275,147	100.00%

==== 2nd district ====
Incumbents Dante Bagarinao, Peter Co, Jojo Documento II, and Jasmin Pinsoy-Lagutin ran for re-election to a second term. The four were all elected in 2022 under PDP-Laban. Lakas-CMD's nominees are incumbents Bagarinao, Co, Documento, and businessman Chady Yebes. They faced Partido Federal ng Pilipinas nominees incumbent Pinsoy-Lagutin, businesswoman and talent manager Beverly Labadlabad, and lawyers Ricky Mejorada and Clyde Naong. The only independent candidate is businessman Noel Bandala.

===== Candidates =====
Declared

- Dante Bagarinao (Lakas), incumbent board member since 2022
- Noel Bandala (Independent), businessman
- Peter Co (Lakas), incumbent board member since 2022 and lawyer
- Michael "Jojo" Documento II (Lakas), incumbent board member since 2022
- Beverly Labadlabad (PFP), businesswoman
- Uldarico "Ricky" Mejorada II (PFP), lawyer and former board member
- Clyde Naong (PFP), lawyer and perennial candidate
- Jasmin Pinsoy-Lagutin (PFP), incumbent board member since 2022
- Richard Yebes (Lakas), businessman

Results

2025 Zamboanga del Norte Provincial Board election from the second district
Party	Candidate	Votes	%
Lakas	Dante Bagarinao	126,526	16.53%
Lakas	Peter "Atornipeter" Co	121,843	15.92%
Lakas	Michael "Jojo" Documento II	120,345	15.72%
Lakas	Richard "Chady" Yebes	118,084	15.43%
PFP	Beverly Labadlabad	87,027	11.37%
PFP	Jasmin Pinsoy-Lagutin	66,325	8.66%
PFP	Uldarico "Attorney Ricky" Mejorada II	61,406	8.02%
PFP	Clyde Naong	59,699	7.8%
Independent	Noel Bandala	4,241	0.55%
Total votes		765,496	100.00%

==== 3rd district ====
Incumbents Kay Marie Bolando, Leo Mejorada, JR Brillantes, and Conkee Buctuan ran for re-election to a second term. Lakas-CMD's nominees are businesswoman and incumbent Liloy Sangguniang Bayan member Venus Uy and incumbent Kay Marie Bolando. Liberal's nominees are incumbents lawyer Leo Mejorada and JR Brillantes. Nacionalista's nominees are former board member Boy Soriano Jr. and lawyer Ivan Patrick Ang. Partido Federal ng Pilipinas's only nominee is incumbent Conkee Buctuan.

2025 Zamboanga del Norte Provincial Board election from the third district
Party	Candidate	Votes	%
Lakas	Venus Uy	113,661	18.2%
Lakas	Kay Marie Bolando	111,009	17.77%
Liberal	Leo Nicanor "Atty. Leo" Mejorada	102,774	16.46%
Liberal	Jeff Raymund "JR" Brillantes	98,798	15.82%
Nacionalista	Constantino "Boy" Soriano Jr.	74,398	11.91%
PFP	Franco Angelo "Conkee" Buctuan	71,827	11.5%
Nacionalista	Ivan Patrick "Attorney Ang" Ang	52,080	8.34%
Total votes		624,547	100.00%

== Congressional elections ==
=== 1st district ===
Incumbent representative Pinpin Uy of Lakas–CMD ran for re-election to a second term. Uy faced mayor of Piñan Cely Jalosjos Carreon of Nacionalista and two other candidates.

2025 House of Representatives election from Zamboanga del Norte's 1st congressional district
Party	Candidate	Votes	%
Lakas	Roberto "Pinpin" Uy Jr.	92,806	58.4%
Nacionalista	Cecilia "Cely" Jalosjos Carreon	58,043	36.53%
NPC	Frederico "Kuya Jan" Jalosjos	6,441	4.05%
Reporma	December Gay "Cay" Carreon	1,620	1.02%
Total votes		158,910	100.00%
Lakas hold			

=== 2nd district ===
Incumbent representative Glona Labadlabad of Lakas–CMD was ineligible to run for re-election and was term limited. Her party nominated her daughter Irene Labadlabad. Labadlabad faced Nacionalista's provincial administrator Tata Monteclaro.

2025 House of Representatives election from Zamboanga del Norte's 2nd congressional district
Party	Candidate	Votes	%
Lakas	Irene "Ate Ai" Labadlabad	165,985	72.74%
Nacionalista	Aurelio "Tata" Monteclaro	62,220	27.26%
Total votes		228,205	100.00%
Lakas hold			

=== 3rd district ===
Incumbent representative Ian Amatong of Liberal ran for re-election to a second term. Amatong faced Nacionalista's nominee and former representative Cesar Jalosjos, brother of Romeo Jalosjos Sr. and an uncle to Bullet. Amatong and Jalosjos previously faced off against each other in last election where Amatong won.

2025 House of Representatives election from Zamboanga del Norte's 3rd congressional district
Party	Candidate	Votes	%
Liberal	Adrian Michael "Ian" Amatong	129,731	63.28%
Nacionalista	Cesar Jalosjos	75,271	36.72%
Total votes		205,002	100.00%
Liberal hold			

== City and municipal elections ==
=== 1st district ===
==== City of Dapitan ====
Incumbent mayor Bullet Jalosjos of Partido Federal ng Pilipinas was eligible for re-election to a second term but opted to run for governor, his party nominated his sister, incumbent barangay captain of Dawo, Dapitan City and ex-officio board member Maita Jalosjos. Jalosjos faced former mayor of Dipolog Evelyn Uy of Lakas–CMD. Uy is also the wife of former governor Roberto Uy. In the vice mayoralty race, incumbent Al Sy ran for re-election to a second term.

2025 Dapitan mayoral election
Party	Candidate	Votes	%
Lakas	Evelyn "Belen" Uy	35,662	52.53%
PFP	Sushmita "Maita" Jalosjos	32,222	47.47%
Total votes		67,884	100.00%
Lakas gain from PFP			

2025 Dapitan vice mayoral election
Party	Candidate	Votes	%
Lakas	Gabriel Cad	32,538	50.21%
Nacionalista	Alfredo "Al" Sy	32,269	49.79%
Total votes		64,807	100.00%
Lakas gain from Nacionalista			

2025 Dapitan City Council election
Party	Candidate	Votes	%
Lakas	Raul Carreon	31,352	5.55%
Lakas	Alexandra Judith "Alex Bajamunde" Pajaro	31,308	5.54%
Lakas	Ian Francis "Ayan" Adasa	31,298	5.54%
Lakas	Jeneth Napigquit-Baje	30,821	5.45%
Lakas	John Empeynado	30,273	5.36%
Lakas	Bienvenido Dini-ay	30,230	5.35%
Lakas	Dennis Tan	30,101	5.33%
Lakas	Jonathan Cadiente	29,707	5.26%
Lakas	Erasmo Bayron	29,523	5.22%
Lakas	Ruel Nadela	28,716	5.08%
PFP	Divine Patilano	28,132	4.98%
PFP	Peter Dominic "Britz" Hamoy	28,060	4.97%
Nacionalista	Mitzie Dulawan	28,043	4.96%
Nacionalista	Joseph Ryan Agolong	26,746	4.73%
PFP	Francis Dick Dy	25,966	4.6%
APP	Ronie "Pareng Hope" Jarapan	25,737	4.55%
PFP	Ferod Arlou Den Gonzales	25,318	4.48%
Nacionalista	Claver "Torni Clavs" Pajaren	24,976	4.42%
APP	Modesta "Modess" Hamoy-Malayao	24,912	4.41%
PFP	Nerio Seripa	23,835	4.22%
Total votes		565,054	100.00%

==== La Libertad ====
Having been elected in 2022 under PDP-Laban, incumbents mayor Liza Mejias and vice mayor Romeo Mejias are eligible for reelection but opted to switch places with each other and both run under PFP. Facing the political couple are the tandem of incumbent Sangguniang Bayan member Ricky Cuenca of Lakas-CMD and lawyer Pete Zamora of Reporma as mayor and vice mayor, respectively.

2025 La Libertad mayoral election
Party	Candidate	Votes	%
Lakas	Ricky Cuenca	2,863	52.03%
PFP	Romeo Mejias	2,640	47.97%
Total votes		5,503	100.00%
Lakas gain from Nacionalista			

2025 La Libertad vice mayoral election
Party	Candidate	Votes	%
Reporma	Pete "Atornz" Zamora	2,804	53.53%
Nacionalista	Liza Mejias	2,434	46.47%
Total votes		5,238	100.00%
Reporma gain from PFP			

==== Mutia ====
Incumbents mayor Lorrymir Adasa and vice mayor Chan-Chan Kwan are running for re-election with the latter running unopposed.

Mutia Mayoralty Election
Party	Candidate	Votes	%
Lakas	Lorrymir Adasa	6,118	72.27%
PFP	Christian Roy "Roy" Dulang	2,348	27.73%
Total votes		8,466	100%
Lakas hold			

Mutia Vice Mayoralty Election
Party	Candidate	Votes	%
Lakas	Christian James "Chan-Chan" Kwan	7,304	100%
Total votes		7,304	100%
Lakas hold			

==== Piñan (New Piñan) ====
Incumbent mayor Cely Jalosjos-Carreon is term-limited and opted to reclaim the representative seat for the 1st district, fielding her daughter incumbent board member Angel Jalosjos Carreon of PFP for the mayorship. Incumbent vice mayor Rommel Gudmalin is eligible for reelection, but opted to run for mayor under Lakas-CMD.

Piñan Mayoralty Election
Party	Candidate	Votes	%
Lakas	Rommel "Tata" Gudmalin	6,905	54.07%
PFP	Angelica "Angel" Jalosjos Carreon	5,865	45.93%
Total votes		12,770	100%
Lakas gain from PFP			

Piñan Vice Mayoralty Election
Party	Candidate	Votes	%
Lakas	Benedicto "Joboy" Cainta, II	6,284	50.80%
Nacionalista	Jose Antonio "Yulik" Galan	6,086	49.20%
Total votes		12,370	100%
Lakas gain from Nacionalista			

==== Polanco ====
Incumbents mayor Boyet Olvis and vice mayor Fred Bait-it are term-limited and ineligible for re-election. Boyet Olvis ran for vice mayor under Nacionalista as his group fielded former Zamboanga del Norte vice governor Bebie Olvis of PFP for mayor; Bait-it opted to run for a Sangguniang Bayan seat. The two Olvises faced Lakas's incumbent Sangguniang Bayan member Ying Uy and radio broadcaster Ronald Butuan for mayor and vice mayor, respectively.

Polanco Mayoralty Election
Party	Candidate	Votes	%
Lakas	Shaia Ruth "Ying" Uy	16,636	63.43%
PFP	Francis "Bebie" Olvis	9,591	36.57%
Total votes		26,227	100%
Lakas gain from PFP			

Polanco Vice Mayoralty Election
Party	Candidate	Votes	%
Nacionalista	Evan Hope "Boyet" Olvis	14,748	57.96%
Lakas	Ronald Butuan	10,695	42.04%
Total votes		25,443	100%
Nacionalista hold			

==== Rizal ====
Incumbents mayor Marissa Manigsaca and vice mayor Jose Salac are running for re-election.

Rizal Mayoralty Election
Party	Candidate	Votes	%
Lakas	Marissa Manigsaca	7,230	56.91%
PFP	Rodrigo Bahi-an, Jr.	5,475	43.09%
Total votes		12,705	100%
Lakas hold			

Rizal Vice Mayoralty Election
Party	Candidate	Votes	%
Lakas	Jose "Inday" Salac	7,320	61.08%
Nacionalista	Mark Mah	4,664	38.92%
Total votes		11,984	100%
Lakas hold			

==== Sergio Osmeña Sr. ====
Incumbent mayor Augustines Magsalay, who was reelected to the position in 2022, died on September 1, 2024; then incumbent vice mayor Sunny Tiso became mayor through succession. Tiso ran for vice mayor in this election.

Sergio Osmeña Sr. Mayoralty Election
Party	Candidate	Votes	%
Lakas	Glen Yu	9,186	46.25%
PFP	John Russell "Jojo" Magsalay	5,529	27.84%
Independent	Angelo Mangao	5,146	25.91%
Total votes		19,861	100%
Lakas gain from PFP			

Sergio Osmeña Sr. Vice Mayoralty Election
Party	Candidate	Votes	%
Lakas	Ciddycriz "Bador" Villamin	9,328	48.99%
Nacionalista	Wilbert "Obing" Fuego, Sr.	4,940	25.94%
Independent	Sunny Tiso	4,774	25.07%
Total votes		19,042	100%
Lakas gain from Nacionalista			

==== Sibutad ====
Incumbent mayor Eufracio Caidic is eligible for reelection, but did not run. Incumbent vice mayor Inting Elumba is eligible for reelection, but opted to run for mayor under PFP. Incumbent Sangguniang Bayan members Edilbrando Lagudas and Charnel Jade Batulan are resprectively running as a ticket as mayor for Lakas and vice mayor for the Uy-aligned Kusog Kalambuan.

Sibutad Mayoralty Election
Party	Candidate	Votes	%
Lakas	Edilbrando Lagudas	6,267	52.93%
PFP	Vicente "Amigo-Inting" Elumba	5,573	47.07%
Total votes		11,840	100%
Lakas gain from PFP			

Sibutad Vice Mayoralty Election
Party	Candidate	Votes	%
Kusog Kalambuan	Charnel Jade Batulan	6,350	55.17%
Nacionalista	Romeo "Utol-Meo" Jalosjos III	5,160	44.83%
Total votes		11,510	100%
Kusog Kalambuan gain from Nacionalista			

=== 2nd district ===
==== City of Dipolog ====
Incumbent mayor Darel Dexter Uy is term-limited and ineligible for re-election, opting to run for governor; incumbent vice mayor Senen Angeles is running for reelection. Uy's party nominated former governor Berto Uy for city mayor. The elder Uy faced incumbent Zamboanga del Norte governor Nene Jalosjos and an independent candidate.

In the City Council election, incumbent councilor James Verduguez planned to run for reelection, but had to withdraw his candidacy and, consequently, resign from his post on February 4, 2025 upon his appointment as a city prosecutor for the National Prosecution Service. With this, Verduguez's party Lakas-CMD invited independent candidate Diony Bejer to join their slate as a guest candidate.

Dipolog mayoralty election
Party	Candidate	Votes	%
Lakas	Roberto "Berto" Uy	46,756	59.76%
PFP	Rosalina "Nanay Nene" Jalosjos	31,239	39.93%
Independent	Nestor Ballano	245	0.31%
Total votes		78,240	100%
Lakas hold			

Dipolog vice mayoralty election
Party	Candidate	Votes	%
Lakas	Senen Angeles	44,018	58.23%
Nacionalista	Miles "Atty. Miles" Villanueva-Jalosjos	31,581	41.77%
Total votes		75,599	100%
Lakas hold			

Dipolog City Council election
Party	Candidate	Votes	%
Lakas	Ryan Niel Asprer	44,779	7.46%
Lakas	James Cyril Ruiz III	44,621	7.44%
Lakas	Jonald "Jojo" Napigquit	43,644	7.27%
Lakas	Roseller "Matoy" Barinaga	43,096	7.18%
Lakas	Harrison "Harry Sho" Young	42,864	7.14%
Lakas	Kenny Val "Kenny" Ong	41,214	6.87%
Lakas	Romulo "Muling" Soliva	39,332	6.56%
Lakas	Raul Barbaso	37,680	6.28%
Lakas	Praxides "Praxy" Rubia	35,328	5.89%
PFP	Ofelia "Doc Ofel" Acis	27,029	4.51%
PFP	Carlito "Bong" Ortega	24,690	4.12%
PFP	Joven Uy	23,898	3.98%
PFP	Daniel Bagarinao, Jr.	23,883	3.98%
PFP	Benjie Maligro	22,491	3.75%
Independent	Dionisio "Diony" Bejer	22,077	3.68%
PFP	Godofredo "Bong" Amarille	22,070	3.68%
PFP	Ray "Raymond" Acopiado	22,004	3.67%
PFP	Thaddeus Theodore "Thaddeus" Sorronda	19,976	3.33%
PFP	Razul Pango	19,246	3.21%
Total votes		599,922	100%

==== Jose Dalman (Ponot) ====
Incumbents mayor Allen Ferrater and vice mayor Juliet Macapaz are running for reelection with the former running unopposed.

Jose Dalman Mayoralty Election
Party	Candidate	Votes	%
Lakas	Allen Ferrater	12,617	100%
Total votes		12,617	100%
Lakas hold			

Jose Dalman Vice Mayoralty Election
Party	Candidate	Votes	%
Lakas	Julieta "Juliet" Macapaz	12,230	81.63%
PFP	Rex Moncada	2,753	18.37%
Total votes		14,983	100%
Lakas hold			

==== Katipunan ====
Incumbents mayor Maiko Wong and vice mayor Nonie Jumawak are running for re-election. Former mayor Patchie Eguia is running to take back the mayoralty.

Katipunan Mayoralty Election
Party	Candidate	Votes	%
Lakas	Jose Michael Meiko "Maiko" Wong	14,821	54.67%
PFP	Patchito "Patchie" Eguia	12,289	45.33%
Total votes		27,110	100%
Lakas hold			

Katipunan Vice Mayoralty Election
Party	Candidate	Votes	%
Lakas	Antonio "Nonie" Jumawak	15,262	59.91%
Nacionalista	Paul John "Jongjong" Reinante	10,212	40.09
Total votes		25,474	100%
Lakas hold			

==== Manukan ====
Incumbents mayor Eugene Caballero and vice mayor Enriquita Winters are term-limited and ineligible for re-election. The two incumbents opted to switch places with each other with Winters running unopposed.

Manukan Mayoralty Election
Party	Candidate	Votes	%
Lakas	Enriquita "Ate" Winters	16,416	100%
Total votes		16,416	100%
Lakas hold			

Manukan Vice Mayoralty Election
Party	Candidate	Votes	%
Lakas	Eugene "Gen" Caballero	16,439	89.97%
Independent	Uvynel Antiquina	1,833	10.03%
Total votes		18,272	100%
Lakas hold			

==== Pres. Manuel A. Roxas ====
Incumbents mayor Junior Rengquijo and vice mayor Jun-Jun Yebes, both elected in the previous election from opposing parties, are running for re-election under Lakas-CMD. The former faced erstwhile ally, lawyer and former Roxas mayor Jan Hendrick Vallecer.

Pres. Manuel A. Roxas Mayoralty Election
Party	Candidate	Votes	%
Lakas	Ismael "Junior" Rengquijo, Jr.	14,186	64.69%
PFP	Jan Hendrick "Atty. Jan" Vallecer	7,743	35.31%
Total votes		21,929	100%
Lakas hold			

Pres. Manuel A. Roxas Vice Mayoralty Election
Party	Candidate	Votes	%
Lakas	Rolando "Jun-Jun" Yebes, Jr.	13,454	65.01%
PFP	Leonides "Dodoy" Parilla	7,240	34.99%
Total votes		20,694	100%
Lakas hold			

==== Siayan ====
Incumbent mayor Ali Bongcawel is running for re-election; incumbent vice mayor Josecor Gepolongca is eligible for re-election, but opted to run for mayor. Bongcawel's party, Lakas-CMD, nominated former provincial board member Logoy Decierdo as his vice mayoralty candidate.

Siayan Mayoralty Election
Party	Candidate	Votes	%
Lakas	Alberto "Ali" Bongcawel	14,229	65.60%
PFP	Josecor Gepolongca	7,460	34.40%
Total votes		21,689	100%
Lakas hold			

Siayan Vice Mayoralty Election
Party	Candidate	Votes	%
Lakas	Crisologo "Logoy" Decierdo	12,528	64.53%
APP	Rey Anugon	6,887	35.47%
Total votes		19,415	100%
Lakas gain from APP			

==== Sindangan ====
Incumbent mayor Dodoy Labadlabad, eligible for re-election, did not participate in this election while incumbent vice mayor Boy Sy is running for re-election. It was earlier speculated that mayor Dodoy would switch places with wife, incumbent representative and eventual mayoralty candidate Glona Labadlabad, to reclaim the 2nd district representative position, but decided to field his daughter Irene to run for the said position instead.

Sindangan Mayoralty Election
Party	Candidate	Votes	%
Lakas	Glona Labadlabad	41,801	74.63%
PFP	Marcelo "Tata" Yano	13,993	24.98%
Independent	Angeline "Daday" Ortuoste	217	0.39%
Total votes		56,011	100%
Lakas hold			

Sindangan Vice Mayoralty Election
Party	Candidate	Votes	%
Lakas	Nilo Florentino "Boy" Sy	40,580	77.52%
PFP	Leoncio "Bebot" Orilloza, Jr.	11,765	22.48%
Total votes		52,345	100%
Lakas hold			

=== 3rd district ===
==== Baliguian ====
Incumbents mayor Junior Esmali and vice mayor Vivian Chiong are both running for re-election.

Baliguian Mayoralty Election
Party	Candidate	Votes	%
PFP	Gani "Junior" Esmali, Jr.	7,525	63.26%
Lakas	Sakili Barang	4,371	36.74%
Total votes		11,896	100%
PFP hold			

Baliguian Vice Mayoralty Election
Party	Candidate	Votes	%
Lakas	Cresencio "Sencio" Suson	5,864	50.35%
PFP	Vivian Chiong	5,782	49.65%
Total votes		11,646	100%
Lakas gain from PFP			

==== Godod ====
Incumbent mayor Toto Matildo is ineligible for re-election and opted to run for vice mayor under Nacionalista; incumbent vice mayor Samuel "Lolong" Labad is eligible for re-election but ran for SB Member instead. Matildo's group nominated Matildo Verula of PFP as their mayoral candidate.

Godod Mayoralty Election
Party	Candidate	Votes	%
Lakas	Richie Uy	5,684	56.39%
PFP	Junabelle Grace "Matildo" Verula	4,396	43.61%
Total votes		10,080	100%
Lakas gain from PFP			

Godod Vice Mayoralty Election
Party	Candidate	Votes	%
Lakas	Roldan Molate	5,022	51.10%
Nacionalista	Abel "Toto" Matildo	4,805	48.90%
Total votes		9,827	100%
Lakas gain from Nacionalista			

==== Gutalac ====
Incumbent mayor Justin Quimbo is running for re-election; incumbent vice mayor Onesimo "Jun" Coma, eligible for re-election, opted to run for Sangguniang Bayan member under Quimbo's party Lakas-CMD. Quimbo fielded Aljohn Garzon for the town's open vice mayoralty post.

Gutalac Mayoralty Election
Party	Candidate	Votes	%
Lakas	Eddie Justin Quimbo	16,168	69.82%
PFP	Mariano "Nonoy" Candelaria Jr.	6,989	30.18%
Total votes		23,157	100%
Lakas hold			

Gutalac Vice Mayoralty Election
Party	Candidate	Votes	%
Lakas	Aljohn Garzon	14,880	66.10%
Nacionalista	Marrianne Jafen Candelaria	7,631	33.90%
Total votes		22,511	100%
Lakas hold			

==== Kalawit ====
Incumbents mayor Jun Antojado and vice mayor Merly Masugbo are both term-limited. Antojado's party, Lakas-CMD, fielded his wife Arcel Antojado for the mayoralty, while Masugbo ran against the latter for mayor under PFP.

Kalawit Mayoralty Election
Party	Candidate	Votes	%
Lakas	Arcel Antojado	7,971	58.39%
PFP	Merly Masugbo	5,681	41.61%
Total votes		13,652	100%
Lakas hold			

Kalawit Vice Mayoralty Election
Party	Candidate	Votes	%
Lakas	Rey Bihag	7,090	53.39%
Nacionalista	Joseph "Nonoy" Tan	6,189	46.61%
Total votes		13,279	100%
Lakas hold			

==== Labason ====
Incumbents mayor Jed Quimbo and vice mayor Tony Go are running for re-election. Their primary opponents are PFP's mayoralty candidate JJ Jalosjos, son of former congressman and congressional candidate Cesar Jalosjos, and Nacionalista's vice mayoralty candidate Alfie Roleda, incumbent Sangguniang Bayan member.

Labason Mayoralty Election
Party	Candidate	Votes	%
Lakas	Jelster Ed "Jed" Quimbo	18,070	73.02%
PFP	Jaime Jose "JJ" Jalosjos	6,677	26.98%
Total votes		24,747	100%
Lakas hold			

Labason Vice Mayoralty Election
Party	Candidate	Votes	%
Lakas	Virgilio "Tony Yap" Go	17,217	73.28%
Nacionalista	Alfie Roleda	6,279	26.72%
Total votes		23,496	100%
Lakas hold			

==== Leon B. Postigo (Bacungan) ====
Incumbent mayor Runie Jamora is running for re-election, while incumbent vice mayor Nonoy Acaylar is running for mayor. In the vice mayoralty race, Jamora's party PFP fielded incumbent Sangguniang Bayan member Joy Culanculan, while Acaylar's party Lakas fielded incumbent Sangguniang Bayan member Amo Jr Yu.

Leon B. Postigo Mayoralty Election
Party	Candidate	Votes	%
PFP	Runie Jamora	8,977	55.18%
Lakas	Rodrigo "Nonoy" Acaylar	7,293	44.82%
Total votes		16,270	100%
PFP hold			

Leon B. Postigo Vice Mayoralty Election
Party	Candidate	Votes	%
PFP	Jocelyn "Joy" Culanculan	8,497	57.68%
Lakas	Isidoro "Amo Jr" Yu, Jr.	6,235	42.32%
Total votes		14,732	100%
PFP gain from Lakas			

==== Liloy ====
Incumbents mayor Jun Uy and vice mayor John Momar Insong are running for re-election.

Liloy Mayoralty Election
Party	Candidate	Votes	%
Lakas	Roberto "Jun" Uy Jr.	16,133	60.28%
PFP	Annie Gallo	10,631	39.72%
Total votes		26,764	100%
Lakas hold			

Liloy Vice Mayoralty Election
Party	Candidate	Votes	%
Lakas	John Momar Insong	14,551	56.03%
Nacionalista	Gerry Gallo	11,417	43.97%
Total votes		25,968	100%
Lakas hold			

==== Salug ====
Incumbent mayor William Maribojoc is running for re-election, but incumbent vice mayor Saul Maraon is not participating in the election. Maribojoc's main opponent is former board member Ruth Brillantes of Lakas.

Salug Mayoralty Election
Party	Candidate	Votes	%
Lakas	Ruth "Doc Ruth" Brillantes	9,893	50.82%
PFP	William "Mabuhay" Maribojoc	9,572	49.18%
Total votes		19,465	100%
Lakas gain from PFP			

Salug Vice Mayoralty Election
Party	Candidate	Votes	%
Lakas	Michael Buzon	9,789	51.56%
Nacionalista	Jonathan Balucos	9,196	48.44%
Total votes		18,985	100%
Lakas gain from Nacionalista			

==== Sibuco ====
Incumbent mayor Bong Ventura is running for re-election under Lakas-CMD, while incumbent vice mayor Lood Alipon is running for mayor under PFP. For the open vice mayoralty race, Ventura's Lakas nominated incumbent Sangguniang Bayan member Absar Caril, husband of provincial IPMR representative and ex-officio board member Hadiya Caril, while Alipon's PFP nominated incumbent Sangguniang Bayan member Kenny Perez.

Sibuco Mayoralty Election
Party	Candidate	Votes	%
Lakas	Joel "Bong" Ventura	15,742	63.74%
PFP	Lood Alipon	8,954	36.26%
Total votes		24,696	100%
Lakas hold			

Sibuco Vice Mayoralty Election
Party	Candidate	Votes	%
Lakas	Absar Caril	12,454	50.99%
PFP	Mark Kenwey "Kenny" Perez	11,971	49.01%
Total votes		24,425	100%
Lakas gain from PFP			

==== Siocon ====
Incumbent mayor Ceasar Soriano is running for re-election, while incumbent vice mayor Julius Lobrigas is not participating in the election.

Siocon Mayoralty Election
Party	Candidate	Votes	%
PFP	Ceasar Soriano	13,044	50.95
Lakas	Iftikhar "Teng" Pawaki	11,007	42.99
PDP–Laban	Joshua Baroro	1,550	6.05
Total votes		25,601	100%
PFP hold			

Siocon Vice Mayoralty Election
Party	Candidate	Votes	%
Lakas	Marlyn Duhaylungsod	9,666	39.22%
PFP	Karon Esmali	9,422	38.23%
Independent	Edgar "Atty Ed Pao" Bongalos	3,850	15.62%
PDP–Laban	Jovelito Guardarama	1,707	6.93%
Total votes		24,645	100%
Lakas gain from PFP			

==== Sirawai ====
Incumbents mayor Aljazar Janihim and vice mayor Pahambong Darquez are running for re-election.

Sirawai Mayoralty Election
Party	Candidate	Votes	%
Independent	Aljazar Janihim	13,513	95.05%
PFP	Bhong "Tibong" Dullah	704	4.95%
Total votes		14,217	100%
Independent hold			

Sirawai Vice Mayoralty Election
Party	Candidate	Votes	%
Independent	Pulman "Pahambong" Darquez	12,411	89.59%
PFP	Florencio "Flor" Cariño	1,442	10.41%
Total votes		13,853	100%
Independent hold			

==== Tampilisan ====
Incumbent mayor Bading Carloto is eligible for re-election, but opted to run for vice mayor; incumbent vice mayor Boboy Jauculan is term-limited and opted to run for mayor under PFP. Carloto's party Lakas-CMD fielded her husband, former mayor Bobong Carloto, for the mayoralty.

Tampilisan Mayoralty Election
Party	Candidate	Votes	%
Lakas	Angeles "Bobong" Carloto, II	8,770	59.31%
PFP	Generico "Boboy" Jauculan	6,016	40.69%
Total votes		14,786	100%
Lakas hold			

Tampilisan Vice Mayoralty Election
Party	Candidate	Votes	%
Lakas	Norabeth "Bading" Carloto	8,907	61.85%
Nacionalista	John Michael "JM" Jalosjos	5,495	38.15%
Total votes		14,402	100%
Lakas gain from Nacionalista			
