= 2002 Zamboanga del Norte's 1st congressional district special election =

2002 special election in the Philippines

2002 special election at Zamboanga del Norte's 1st congressional district
- August 26, 2002

Zamboanga del Norte's 1st congressional district Triggered by removal of the incumbent
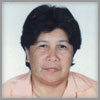

Candidate	Cecilia Jalosjos Carreon	Artemio Adaza, Jr.	Orlando Salatandre
Party	Reporma	Lakas	Independent
Popular vote	64,000	8,404	6,232
Percentage	80.45	10.56	7.83
Representative before election
Romeo Jalosjos Sr.
PDSP
Representative-elect
Cecilia Jalosjos Carreon
Reporma

A special election for Zamboanga del Norte's 1st district seat in the House of Representatives of the Philippines was held on August 26, 2002 to fill the district's vacant seat in the House of Representatives of the Philippines for the remainder of the 12th Congress. The vacancy arose when Romeo Jalosjos Sr., the district's representative, was dropped from the rolls after being convicted with finality for rape of a minor. Jalosjos' sister Cecilia Jalosjos Carreon won the special election convincingly.

== Electoral system ==
The House of Representatives is elected via parallel voting system, with 80% of seats elected from congressional districts, and 20% from the party-list system. Each district sends one representative to the House of Representatives. An election to the seat is via first-past-the-post, in which the candidate with the most votes, whether or not one has a majority, wins the seat.

Based on Republic Act (RA) No. 6645, in order for a special election to take place, the seat must be vacated, the relevant chamber notifies the Commission on Elections (COMELEC) the existence of a vacancy, then the COMELEC schedules the special election. There is a dispute in the procedure as a subsequent law, RA No. 7166, supposedly amended the procedure, bypassing the need for official communication from the relevant chamber of the vacancy. The COMELEC has always waited on official communication from the relevant chamber before scheduling a special election.

Meanwhile, according to RA No. 8295, should only one candidate file to run in the special election, the COMELEC will declare that candidate as the winner and will no longer hold the election.

== District profile ==
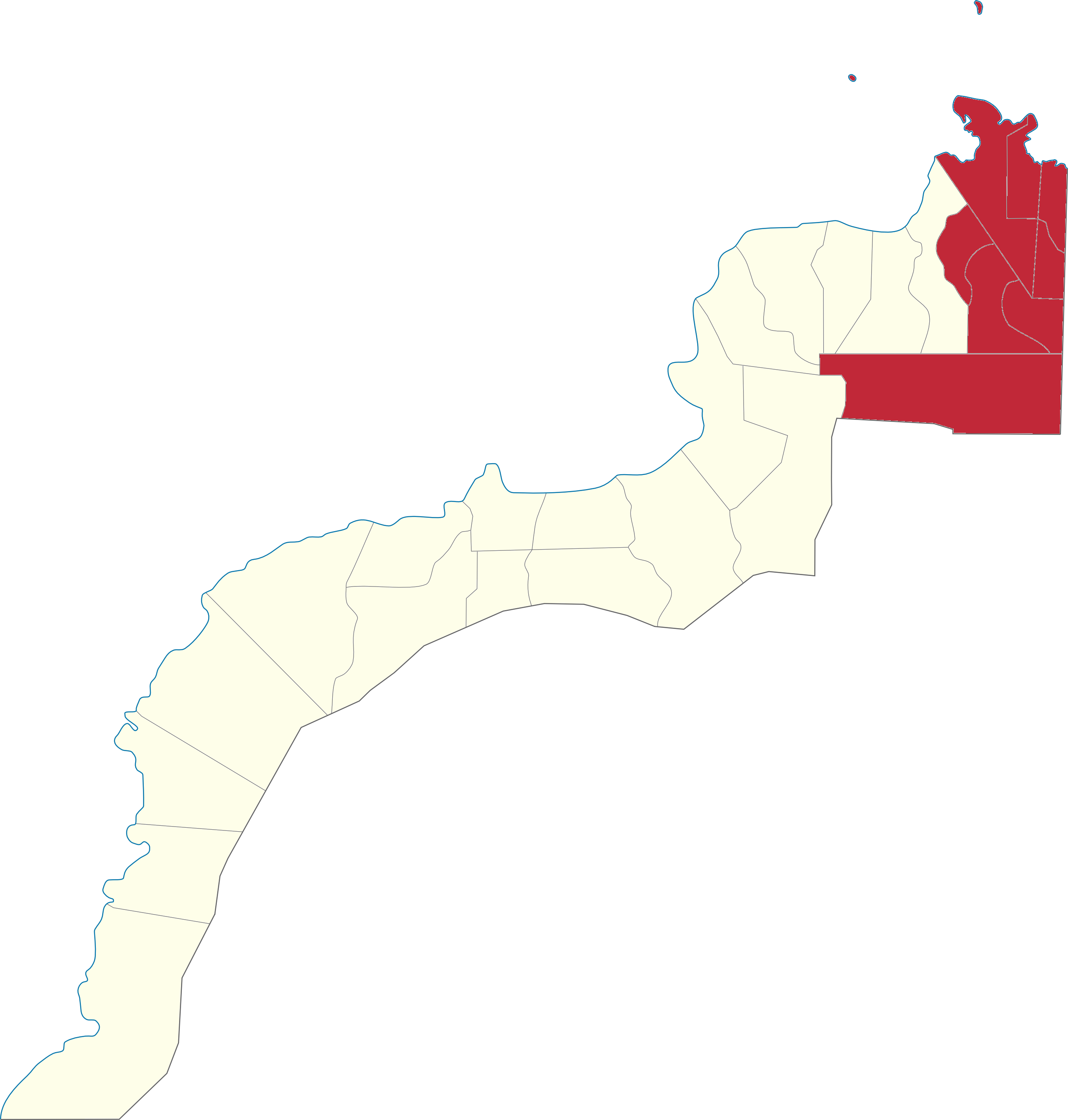
Location of the 1st district in Zamboanga del Norte

Zamboanga del Norte's 1st congressional district is found in the northeastern part of the province, consisting of the city of Dapitan and the municipalities of La Libertad, Mutia, Piñan, Polanco, Rizal, Sergio Osmeña, and Sibutad. Romeo Jalosjos Sr. has held the district since winning in 1995.

== Background ==
The House of Representatives dropped incumbent representative Romeo Jalosjos Sr. from the rolls after his conviction for rape of a minor was rendered final by the Supreme Court on November 15, 2001. Jalosjos, who was accused of rape in 1996, was originally convicted by the Makati Regional Trial Court, and sentenced to two life terms, aside from penalties from six counts of lasciviousness, but still won reelection in 2001. The vacancy caused the House of Representatives to ask the Commission on Elections to call for a special election.

Jalosjos objected to him merely being dropped from the roll of members, demanding to Speaker Jose de Venecia Jr. to expel him outright instead. Jalosjos also said that his sister Cecilia will run in a special election to vindicate him, and blamed ex-president Fidel V. Ramos for his arrest, allegeding Ramos wanted to be president again.

== Candidates ==
Cecilia Jalosjos Carreon, mayor of Piñan and Jalosjos' sister, and a member of the Zamboanga del Norte Provincial Board backed by the Adazas were the rumored candidates for the special election, according to Luzviminda Tancangco, commissioner of the Commission on Elections.

Four candidates filed the paperwork to run for the vacant seat:

1. Cecilia Jalosjos Carreon (Reporma-Lapiang Malaya), mayor of Piñan and Jalosjos' sister
2. Orlando Salatandre Jr. (independent), a former member of the Zamboanga del Norte Provincial Board, and one of the defense counsels of Philippine Benevolent Missionaries Association leader Ruben Ecleo Jr.
3. Archie Adaza (Lakas), son of former Representative Artemio Adaza
4. Elly Pamatong (independent), legal counsel of MNLF chairman Nur Misuari

== Result ==
2002 Zamboanga del Norte's 1st congressional district special election
Candidate	Party	Votes	%
Cecilia Jalosjos-Carreon	Partido para sa Demokratikong Reporma	64,000	80.45
Artemio Adaza Jr.	Lakas–NUCD–UMDP	8,404	10.56
Orlando Salatandre	Independent	6,232	7.83
Elly Pamatong	Independent	918	1.15
Total		79,554	100.00
Majority		55,596	69.88
Partido para sa Demokratikong Reporma gain from Partido Demokratiko Sosyalista ng Pilipinas			

Carreon won via landslide, earning 64,000 votes. She served until the end of her brother's unfinished term in 2004. She was sworn in by President Gloria Macapagal Arroyo on August 29 at Sergio Osmeña, Zamboanga del Norte.

== Aftermath ==
The seat became a stronghold of the Jalosjos family. Carreon was re-elected in the 2004 and 2007 general elections. Romeo's son Bullet won in 2010, and defended the seat two more times until he was term-limited in 2019. Romeo's son and Bullet's brother, Romeo Jr., won in 2019. Romeo Jr. was proclaimed winner in 2022, but vacated the seat later on due to pending disqualification cases against his opponents.

Carreon served as mayor of Piñan, Zamboanga del Norte from 2022 to 2025. Romeo Sr. did not hold any elective positions again following his removal from Congress and died on August 2, 2026.
