= Mutia, Zamboanga del Norte =

Municipality in Zamboanga del Norte, Philippines

Mutia Salvacion
- Municipality
- Municipality of Mutia
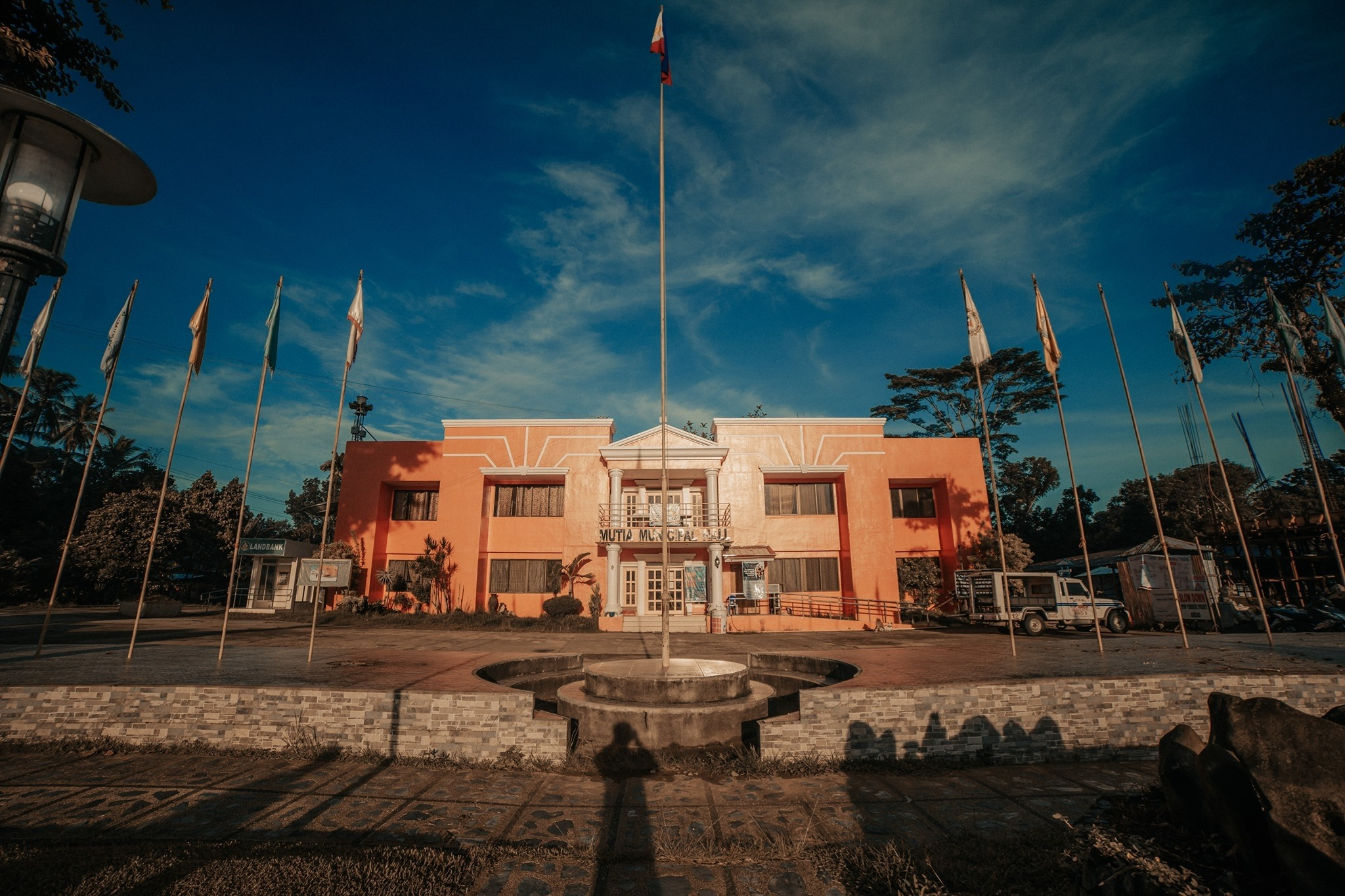
- Municipal hall in 2021

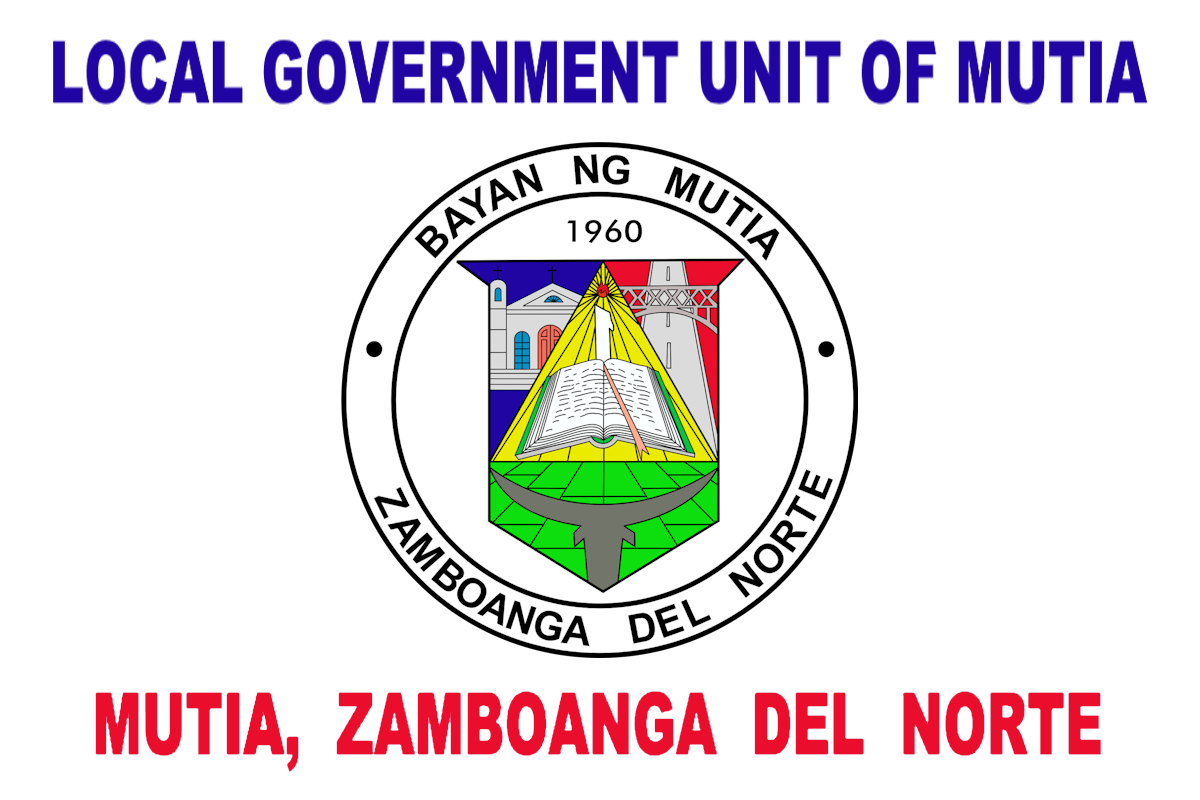
- Flag Seal

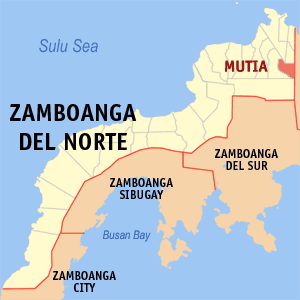
- Map of Zamboanga del Norte with Mutia highlighted
- Interactive map of Mutia
- Location within the Philippines
- Coordinates: 8°25′12″N 123°28′32″E
- Country: Philippines
- Region: Zamboanga Peninsula
- Province: Zamboanga del Norte
- District: 1st district
- Named for: Francisco Mutia
- Barangays: 16 (see Barangays)

Government
  - Type: Sangguniang Bayan
  - Mayor: Lorrymir S. Adasa (Lakas)
  - Vice Mayor: Christian James P. Kwan (Lakas)
  - Representative: Roberto T. Uy Jr. (Lakas)
  - Municipal Council: Members: Radolf Zell L. Adasa; Ivy C. Baguinat; Erneson B. Veradio; Raymond T. Bacatan; Randy Q. Bait-it; Antonio C. Rosal; Jenito M. Bohol; Claudio Y. Co
  - Electorate: 10,028 voters (2025)

Area
  - Total: 73.58 km^{2} (28.41 sq mi)
- Elevation: 191 m (627 ft)
- Highest elevation: 509 m (1,670 ft)
- Lowest elevation: 38 m (125 ft)

Population (2024 census)
  - Total: 12,197
  - Density: 165.8/km^{2} (429.3/sq mi)
  - Households: 3,004

Economy
  - Income class: 4th municipal income class
  - Poverty incidence: 44.73% (2023)
  - Revenue: ₱ 104.6 million (2024)
  - Assets: ₱ 398.4 million (2024)
  - Expenditure: ₱ 55.18 million (2024)
  - Liabilities: ₱ 150.3 million (2024)

Service provider
  - Electricity: Zamboanga del Norte Electric Cooperative (ZANECO)
- Time zone: UTC+8 (PST)
- ZIP code: 7107
- PSGC: 0907208000
- IDD : area code: +63 (0)65
- Native languages: Subanon; Cebuano; Chavacano; Tagalog
- Website: mutia.zamboangadelnorte.com

Mutia, officially the Municipality of Mutia (Cebuano: Lungsod sa Mutia; Subanen: Benwa Mutia; Chavacano: Municipalidad de Mutia; Tagalog: Bayan ng Mutia), is a municipality in the province of Zamboanga del Norte, Philippines. According to the 2024 census, it has a population of 12,197 people.

== History ==
The land now known as Mutia was known as Salvacion, a sitio in barrio Sianib of the undivided municipality of Dipolog. Earlier inhabitants of the place were Subanen who used to live on the mountainous terrains of the area. Subanen families or clans used to dominate the place, chief among them was a man named Sumambog Basilio who once served as their timuay. When the tribes eventually welcomed settlers from the Visayas and eventually introduced Christianity in the area, the land was christened with the name "Salvacion," a Spanish term for salvation, in hopes for bountiful development in the so-called "virgin lands."

When the towns of Polanco and New Piñan (later became simply Piñan in 1960) seceded from Dipolog on August 22, 1951, barrio Sianib became a part of Polanco while sitio Salvacion became a part of New Piñan and was elevated into a barrio. Around this time, a group of residents led by Filemon A. Torres, Sr. staged a campaign for the creation of a new municipality of Salvacion from New Piñan. Support from the then young municipality was positive and New Piñan's government passed a resolution creating the future municipality. Prior to its passage, however, the provincial board of Zamboanga del Norte amended the resolution to rename Salvacion to Mutia in honor of Philippine Constabulary sergeant Francisco Mutia who, along with his companions, led a successful operation in the suppression of the criminal trade of the Torreno brothers in Salvacion, leading to the deaths of Sgt. Mutia and one of the brothers.

Ultimately, on July 22, 1960, upon the recommendation of Zamboanga del Norte's provincial board, President Carlos P. Garcia signed Executive Order No. 402 creating the municipality of Mutia from the newly-renamed municipality of Piñan. From its mother municipality, the barrios and sitios of Salvacion, Tinglan, Buenasuerte, Dilac, New Foundland (now Newland), Pamocloran, Totongan, Tubac, New Casul, and New Siquijor form part of the new municipality, with Filemon A. Torres, Sr. serving as its first town mayor.

== Geography ==
=== Barangays ===
Mutia is politically subdivided into 16 barangays. Each barangay consists of puroks while some have sitios.

- Alvenda
- Buenasuerte
- Diland
- Diolen
- Head Tipan
- New Casul
- New Siquijor
- Newland
- Paso Rio
- Poblacion
- San Miguel
- Santo Tomas
- Tinglan
- Totongon
- Tubac
- Unidos

=== Climate ===
Climate data for Mutia, Zamboanga del Norte
Month	Jan	Feb	Mar	Apr	May	Jun	Jul	Aug	Sep	Oct	Nov	Dec	Year
Mean daily maximum °C (°F)	28 (82)	28 (82)	29 (84)	30 (86)	29 (84)	29 (84)	29 (84)	29 (84)	29 (84)	28 (82)	29 (84)	28 (82)	29 (84)
Mean daily minimum °C (°F)	22 (72)	22 (72)	22 (72)	23 (73)	24 (75)	24 (75)	24 (75)	23 (73)	23 (73)	23 (73)	23 (73)	23 (73)	23 (73)
Average precipitation mm (inches)	104 (4.1)	76 (3.0)	92 (3.6)	97 (3.8)	199 (7.8)	238 (9.4)	195 (7.7)	193 (7.6)	178 (7.0)	212 (8.3)	171 (6.7)	110 (4.3)	1,865 (73.3)
Average rainy days	14.7	12.5	15.8	17.5	27.6	28.5	29.0	27.5	26.9	27.9	23.5	18.2	269.6
Source: Meteoblue

== Demographics ==
Population census of Mutia
Year	Pop.	±% p.a.
1970	6,093	—
1975	6,895	+2.51%
1980	7,976	+2.95%
1990	8,625	+0.79%
1995	8,915	+0.62%
2000	9,806	+2.06%
2007	12,078	+2.92%
2010	11,975	−0.31%
2015	12,675	+1.09%
2020	11,726	−1.62%
2024	12,197	+0.95%
Source: Philippine Statistics Authority

== Economy ==
Poverty incidence of Mutia (%)

Source: Philippine Statistics Authority
