= Zamboanga del Norte's 1st congressional district =

Legislative district of the Philippines

- Constituency for the House of Representatives of the Philippines
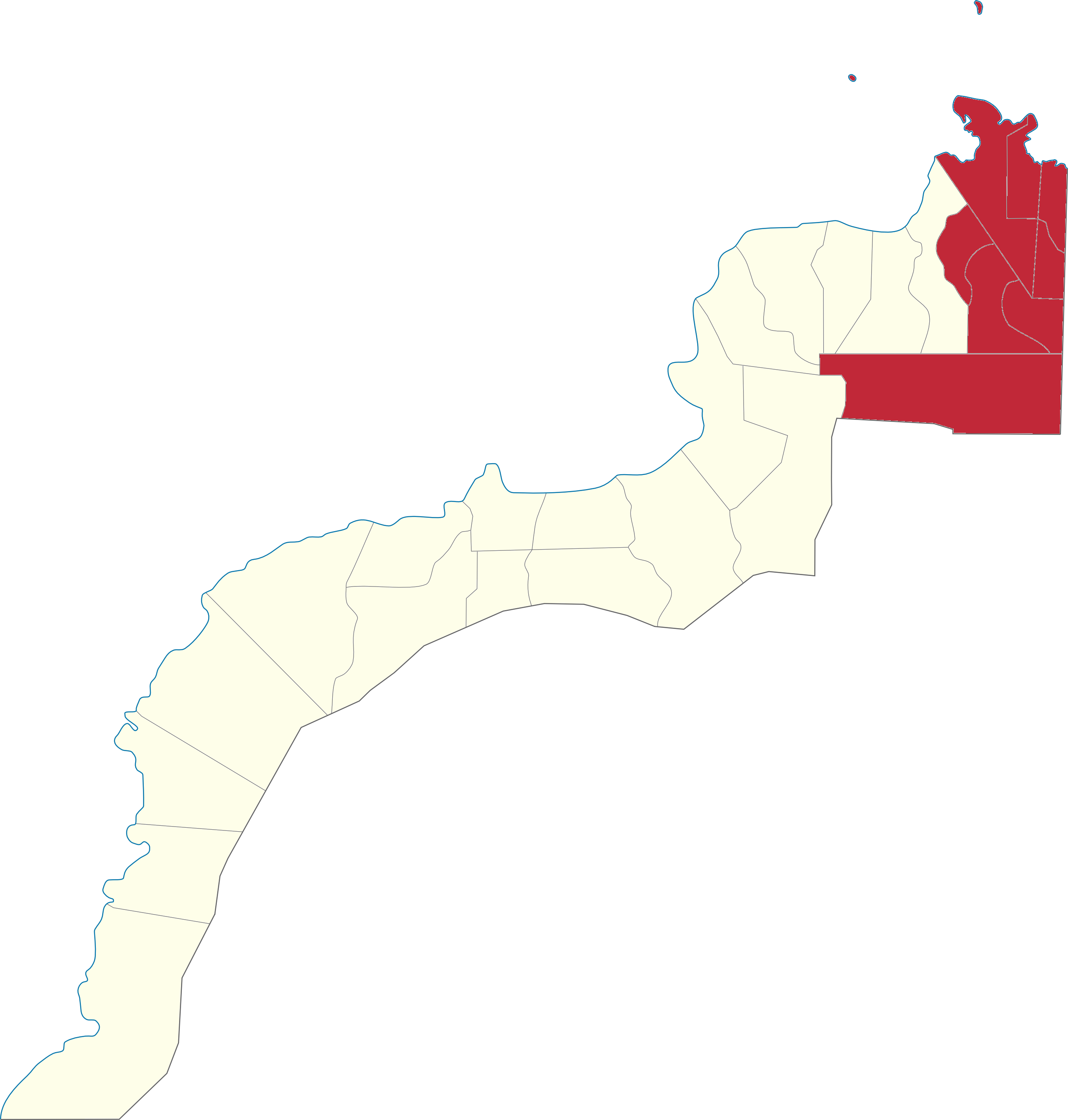
- Boundary of Zamboanga del Norte's 1st congressional district in Zamboanga del Norte

- Location of Zamboanga del Norte within the Philippines
- Province: Zamboanga del Norte
- Region: Zamboanga Peninsula
- Population: 231,980 (2020)
- Electorate: 180,551 (2022)
- Major settlements: 8 LGUs: Cities; Dapitan; Municipalities; La Libertad; Mutia; Piñan; Polanco; Rizal; Sergio Osmeña; Sibutad
- Area: 1,536.29 km^{2} (593.16 sq mi)

Current constituency
- Created: 1987
- Representative: Roberto Uy Jr.
- Political party: Lakas-CMD

Zamboanga del Norte's 1st congressional district is one of the three congressional districts of the Philippines in the province of Zamboanga del Norte. It has been represented in the House of Representatives since 1987. The district encompasses the northernmost portion of the province and consists of the city of Dapitan and adjacent municipalities of La Libertad, Mutia, Piñan, Polanco, Rizal, Sergio Osmeña and Sibutad.

It is currently represented in the 20th Congress by Roberto "Pinpin" Uy Jr. of the Lakas–CMD.

== Representation history ==
#	Member		Term of office		Congress	Party	Electoral history	Constituent LGUs
#	Image	Name (Birth-Death)	Start	End	Congress	Party	Electoral history	Constituent LGUs
=== Zamboanga del Norte's 1st district for the House of Representatives of the Philippines ===
District created February 2, 1987 from Zamboanga del Norte's at-large district.
1		Artemio Adasa Jr.	June 30, 1987	June 30, 1995	8th	PDP–Laban	Elected in 1987.	1987–present Dapitan, La Libertad, Mutia, Piñan, Polanco, Rizal, Sergio Osmeña, Sibutad
1		Artemio Adasa Jr.	June 30, 1987	June 30, 1995	9th	Lakas	Re-elected in 1992.	1987–present Dapitan, La Libertad, Mutia, Piñan, Polanco, Rizal, Sergio Osmeña, Sibutad
2		Romeo G. Jalosjos	June 30, 1995	April 23, 2002	10th	Independent	Elected in 1995.	1987–present Dapitan, La Libertad, Mutia, Piñan, Polanco, Rizal, Sergio Osmeña, Sibutad
2		Romeo G. Jalosjos	June 30, 1995	April 23, 2002	11th	LAMMP	Re-elected in 1998.	1987–present Dapitan, La Libertad, Mutia, Piñan, Polanco, Rizal, Sergio Osmeña, Sibutad
2		Romeo G. Jalosjos	June 30, 1995	April 23, 2002	12th	NPC	Re-elected in 2001. Removed from office after a criminal conviction.	1987–present Dapitan, La Libertad, Mutia, Piñan, Polanco, Rizal, Sergio Osmeña, Sibutad
3		Cecilia Jalosjos-Carreon	September 2, 2002	June 30, 2010	12th	Reporma	Elected in 2002 to finish her brother's term.	1987–present Dapitan, La Libertad, Mutia, Piñan, Polanco, Rizal, Sergio Osmeña, Sibutad
3		Cecilia Jalosjos-Carreon	September 2, 2002	June 30, 2010	13th	PDSP	Re-elected in 2004.	1987–present Dapitan, La Libertad, Mutia, Piñan, Polanco, Rizal, Sergio Osmeña, Sibutad
3		Cecilia Jalosjos-Carreon	September 2, 2002	June 30, 2010	14th	Lakas	Re-elected in 2007.	1987–present Dapitan, La Libertad, Mutia, Piñan, Polanco, Rizal, Sergio Osmeña, Sibutad
4		Bullet Jalosjos	June 30, 2010	June 30, 2019	15th	Lakas (APP)	Elected in 2010.	1987–present Dapitan, La Libertad, Mutia, Piñan, Polanco, Rizal, Sergio Osmeña, Sibutad
4		Bullet Jalosjos	June 30, 2010	June 30, 2019	16th	Nacionalista (APP)	Re-elected in 2013.	1987–present Dapitan, La Libertad, Mutia, Piñan, Polanco, Rizal, Sergio Osmeña, Sibutad
4		Bullet Jalosjos	June 30, 2010	June 30, 2019	17th	Nacionalista (APP)	Re-elected in 2016.	1987–present Dapitan, La Libertad, Mutia, Piñan, Polanco, Rizal, Sergio Osmeña, Sibutad
5		Romeo Jalosjos Jr.	June 30, 2019	July 21, 2022	18th	Nacionalista (APP)	Elected in 2019.	1987–present Dapitan, La Libertad, Mutia, Piñan, Polanco, Rizal, Sergio Osmeña, Sibutad
5		Romeo Jalosjos Jr.	June 30, 2019	July 21, 2022	19th	Nacionalista (APP)	Re-elected in 2022. Election annulled by the Supreme Court after an electoral protest.	1987–present Dapitan, La Libertad, Mutia, Piñan, Polanco, Rizal, Sergio Osmeña, Sibutad
6		Roberto Uy Jr.	November 13, 2023	Incumbent	19th	Lakas	Declared winner of the 2022 elections.	1987–present Dapitan, La Libertad, Mutia, Piñan, Polanco, Rizal, Sergio Osmeña, Sibutad
6		Roberto Uy Jr.	November 13, 2023	Incumbent	20th	Lakas	Re-elected in 2025.	1987–present Dapitan, La Libertad, Mutia, Piñan, Polanco, Rizal, Sergio Osmeña, Sibutad

== Election results ==
=== 2025 ===
Candidate	Party	Votes	%
Pinpin Uy (incumbent)	Lakas–CMD	92,806	58.40
Cely Carreon	Nacionalista Party	58,043	36.53
Jan Jalosjos	Nationalist People's Coalition	6,441	4.05
Cay Carreon	Partido para sa Demokratikong Reporma	1,620	1.02
Total		158,910	100.00
Registered voters/turnout		189,224	–
Lakas–CMD hold			
Source: Commission on Elections

=== 2022 ===
2022 Philippine House of Representatives elections
Party	Candidate	Votes	%
PDP–Laban	Roberto "Pinpin" Uy Jr.	69,591	48.19
Nacionalista	Romeo "Jonjon" Jalosjos Jr. (incumbent)	69,109	47.86
NUP	Frederico "Kuya Jan" Jalosjos	5,424	3.76
PPM	Richard Amazon	288	0.19
Total votes		144,412	100.00
PDP–Laban gain from Nacionalista			

=== 2019 ===
2019 Philippine House of Representatives election in the 1st District of Zamboanga del Norte
Party	Candidate	Votes	%
Nacionalista	Romeo "Jonjon" Jalosjos, Jr.	64,282	
PDP–Laban	Roberto "Pinpin" Uy, Jr.	57,937	
Total votes			
Nacionalista hold			

=== 2002 ===
2002 special election at Zamboanga del Norte's 1st legislative district
Party	Candidate	Votes	%
Reporma	Cecilia Jalosjos Carreon	64,000	80.45
Lakas	Artemio Adaza, Jr.	8,404	10.56
Independent	Orlando Salatandre	6,232	7.83
Independent	Elly Pamatong	918	1.15
Total votes		79,554	100.00
Reporma gain from PDSP			

== See also ==
- Legislative districts of Zamboanga del Norte
