= Romeo Jalosjos Sr. =

Filipino businessman and politician (1940–2026)

Romeo G. Jalosjos Sr.

Member of the House of Representatives from Zamboanga del Norte's 1st district
- In office June 30, 1995 – April 23, 2002
- Preceded by: Artemio Adasa Jr.
- Succeeded by: Cecilia G. Jalosjos-Carreon

Member of the Regular Batasang Pambansa from Zamboanga del Norte
- In office 1984–1986 Serving with Guardson R. Lood
- Preceded by: Felipe B. Azcuna (as congressman)
- Succeeded by: office abolished

Personal details
- Born: Romeo Garcia Jalosjos; November 24, 1940
- Died: August 2, 2026 (aged 85)
- Party: APP (2009–2026)
- Other political affiliations: Nacionalista (1984–1986); Independent (1995–1998); LAMMP (1998–2001); NPC (2001–2002); UNA (2012–2013)
- Spouse: Lourna Pal
- Children: 4, including Romeo Jr., Seth Frederick and Lana
- Parent(s): Dominador Jalosjos Sr. Angelina Garcia
- Occupation: Businessman, politician
- Nickname: Nonong
- Criminal information
- Status: Released on March 18, 2009; Sentence commuted by President Gloria Macapagal-Arroyo on April 30, 2007
- Convictions: Statutory rape under Article 335 (3) of the Revised Penal Code (2 counts); Acts of lasciviousness under Article 336 of the Revised Penal Code, in relation to Section 5(b) of Republic Act No. 7610 or the Child Abuse Law (6 counts)
- Penalty: Reclusion perpetua (for statutory rape); 12 years and one day-15 years, 6months and 20 days of imprisonment (for acts of lasciviousness); Fine of ₱400,000; Suspension from holding public office and temporary disqualification from exercising the right to vote

Romeo "Nonong" Garcia Jalosjos Sr. (November 24, 1940 – August 2, 2026) was a Filipino politician, businessman and television producer who was convicted and imprisoned for raping an 11-year-old girl in 1996 while he was still a congressman.

== Business career ==
Jalosjos began his career as a television producer for ABC and ABS-CBN. Following the closure of ABS-CBN in the aftermath of the declaration of martial law in September 1972, he co-founded Philippine Production Center, Inc., and with the permission of the Lopez family who owned ABS-CBN, brought several of their shows such as Pugo’s Si Tatang Kasi and Dolphy’s Buhay Artista to its rival network, RBS-7, in December 1972. A few years later, he helped set up Production Specialists, and became responsible for the production of several television programs such as Binibining Pilipinas and other beauty pageants, as well as games of the Philippine Basketball Association.

In 1981, Jalosjos, along with his assistant at Production Specialists Tony Tuviera and actors Tito Sotto, Vic Sotto, and Joey de Leon, known collectively as TVJ, founded Television and Production Exponents Inc. (TAPE Inc.), which became known for producing what would become one of the longest-running shows on Philippine television, Eat Bulaga!, of which the Sotto brothers and de Leon became the noontime show's longtime hosts. Jalosjos was also responsible for the selection of the show's name, which was proposed by de Leon, from a list. At the same time, Jalosjos stumbled upon and developed a white-sand beach property in Dapitan, Zamboanga del Norte called Dakak (short for dakong kakahoyan or "big forest"), which has since become a major luxury resort.

== Entry into politics ==
In 1984, Jalosjos entered national politics by being elected as representative of Zamboanga del Norte to the Regular Batasang Pambansa in the 1984 elections. However, his term was cut short after the chamber was abolished by President Corazon Aquino following the People Power Revolution in 1986.

In 1995, Jalosjos successfully ran for the House of Representatives representing the 1st district of Zamboanga del Norte.

== Rape case and imprisonment ==
While serving as a congressman, Jalosjos was charged in 1996 with two counts of statutory rape and 12 counts of sexual abuse and exploitation with lascivious acts for the rape of an 11-year-old girl who had been brought into prostitution by her father in exchange for ₱10,000 ($385) at Jalosjos' condominium unit at the Ritz Towers in Makati. After a warrant was issued for his arrest on December 26 that year, Jalosjos went into hiding until he was arrested by police and units of the National Bureau of Investigation and the Presidential Security Group led by its deputy commander, Colonel Hermogenes Esperon Jr., in an island off Bagac, Bataan on January 17, 1997.

Jalosjos was detained at the Makati City Jail and was tried by the Makati Regional Trial Court Branch 62, which convicted him on two counts of statutory rape and six counts of acts of lasciviousness and sentenced him to life imprisonment and pay damages to the victim. He was subsequently transferred to the New Bilibid Prison. Jalosjos unsuccessfully appealed to the Supreme Court against his conviction in 2001 and 2002. Despite his legal condition, Jalosjos managed to serve as an elected representative and won reelection in 1998 and 2001. Following the Supreme Court's second affirmation of his sentence in 2002, he was removed from the roster of the House of Representatives and was replaced by his sister and mayor of Piñan, Cecilia Jalosjos-Carreon, in a special election held on August 26 of that year.

While in prison, Jalosjos suffered a mild stroke in 2004 that led to him being hospitalized temporarily at the Makati Medical Center. He also financed the construction of several infrastructure in Bilibid such as a tennis court, a gymnasium, and a bakery inside the NBP's maximum security compound. He also financed the construction of the Tennis Academy of the Philippines and a resto-bar in neighboring Katarungan village, all of which he said, was derived from his continued earnings from his outside businesses. In 2011, he acknowledged that he had received special treatment from fellow inmates, stating that "there are angels, and there are [others] higher than angels", and that he did not believe in the insistence of a "democratization of sufferings".

He maintained his innocence throughout his imprisonment and called his case an act of political persecution, specifically blaming officials in the administration of Fidel V. Ramos, who was president at the time he was charged and arrested for the rape, particularly Justice Secretary Teofisto Guingona Jr.

Jalosjos' sentence was commuted to 16 years by President Gloria Macapagal-Arroyo on June 13, 2007, and was allowed to live in a privately owned house in Katarungan Village, which is part of Bilibid's reservation area. On December 22, Jalosjos, after receiving a discharge order from prison authorities, walked out of jail and flew to his native Dapitan, before turning himself in again to authorities the next day after Justice Secretary Raul Gonzalez said that his departure from the prison was "unauthorized". Despite serving only 11 years in prison, he was finally released in 2009 after completing his reduced 16-year term, which officials attributed to benefits gained due to good behavior while in detention.

== After release ==
Jalosjos spent his later years in the private sector, particularly in the running of the Dakak beach resort and TAPE, Inc., where he had a 51% controlling stake augmented by his children's control of a combined total of 24% of the company.

In a 2021 interview, Jalosjos said that he was "proud" of himself being jailed, saying that "history is built with stories about great men who became great because he was jailed first" and citing examples such as Jose Rizal, Ferdinand Marcos, Ninoy Aquino and Nelson Mandela.

In 2025, the Supreme Court convicted Jalosjos of fraud and bad faith after he and Dakak Beach Resort Corporation were sued by the estate of Violeta Saguin de Luzuriaga, who accused Jalosjos of failing to pay rent from the property on which the Dakak resort stands since it was leased to him in 1992 and overstaying after the lease expired. The court also ordered Jalosjos to vacate the land and pay unremitted rentals since that period.

== Eat Bulaga! dispute ==
In March 2023, Jalosjos decided to retire Tony Tuviera as president and CEO of TAPE and replaced him with his son, Romeo Jalosjos Jr. He also named another son, Bullet Jalosjos, as the firm's chief finance officer (CFO), and his daughter Soraya Jalosjos as executive vice president for production. Tuviera's retirement and the differences of the Jalosjos children's management's style, along with their proposed changes to the show's format and salary cuts led to disputes with the show's long-time host trio TVJ and other staff, leading to their departure from TAPE to host Eat Bulaga! (initially renamed E.A.T. before reverting to its original title on January 6, 2024) independently on TV5 beginning in May.

In May 2025, Jalosjos and other officials of TAPE were sued by GMA Network for fraud over the misappropriation of ₱37.94 million (US$770,382.79) in advertising revenues that were used by TAPE for operating expenses instead of being remitted to GMA. The case was dismissed by prosecutors in Quezon City in October 2025.

== Personal life and death ==
Jalosjos was a onetime common-law husband of actress Nida Blanca. They had previously planned to marry in Hong Kong before calling it off. At the time of his death, he was married to Lourna Pal, who is the mother of two of his four children. He was mostly based in Dakak after his release.

He started a political dynasty that has since dominated the politics of Zamboanga del Norte. His sister Rosalina Jalosjos served as the governor of Zamboanga del Norte from 2022 to 2025. Aside from Cecilia, another sibling, Cesar G. Jalosjos, served as congressman for the 3rd district of Zamboanga del Norte, while another brother, Dominador Jalosjos Jr., served as mayor of Dapitan. Jalosjos' children also entered politics, with his sons Romeo Jalosjos Jr. and Bullet Jalosjos who also served in Congress and concurrently holds top management positions at TAPE, Inc., along with his daughter Soraya. Another daughter, Lana Jalosjos, served as mayor of Baliangao, Misamis Occidental, while another daughter, Sushmita, was the Liga ng mga Barangay president of Zamboanga del Norte.

Jalosjos died on August 2, 2026, at the age of 85. A wake was held for him in Taguig on August 3–5 and in Dapitan from August 6–12.

== See also ==
- List of members of the Philippine House of Representatives expelled, removed, or suspended
