= Rizal, Zamboanga del Norte =

Municipality in Zamboanga del Norte, Philippines

Rizal
- Municipality
- Municipality of Rizal
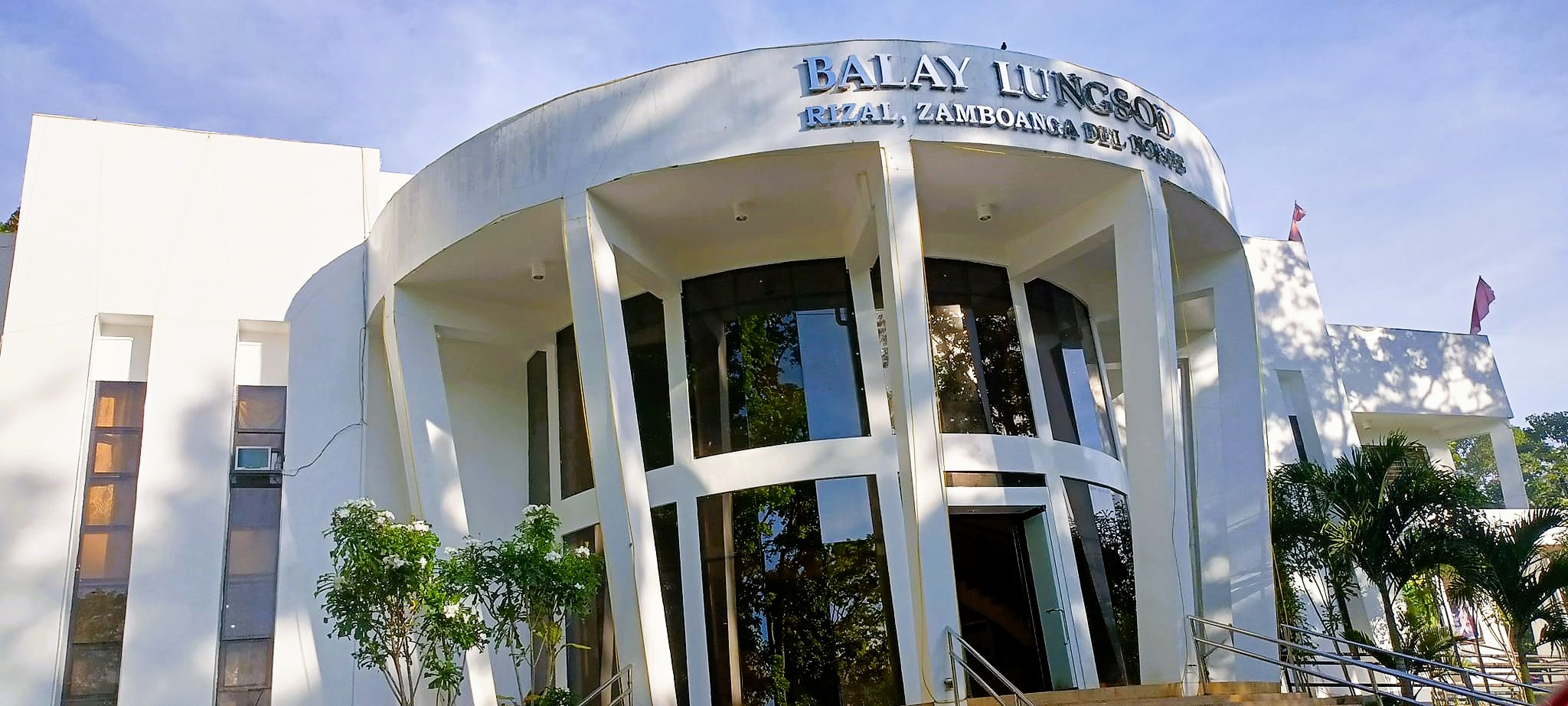
- Municipal hall in 2023

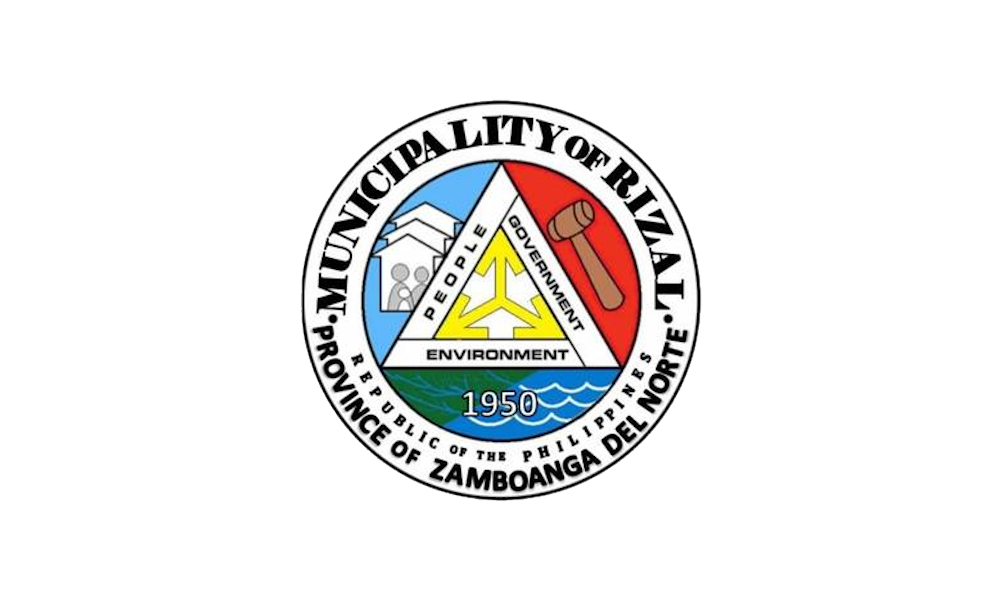
- Flag Seal

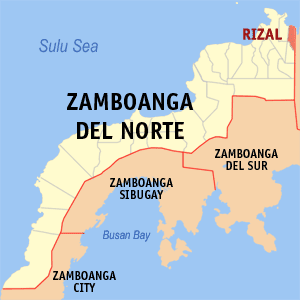
- Map of Zamboanga del Norte with Rizal highlighted
- Interactive map of Rizal
- Location within the Philippines
- Coordinates: 8°31′38″N 123°33′06″E
- Country: Philippines
- Region: Zamboanga Peninsula
- Province: Zamboanga del Norte
- District: 1st district
- Founded: December 21, 1950
- Named for: José Rizal
- Barangays: 22 (see Barangays)

Government
  - Type: Sangguniang Bayan
  - Mayor: Marissa D. Manigsaca (Lakas)
  - Vice Mayor: Jose B. Salac (Lakas)
  - Representative: Roberto T. Uy Jr. (Lakas)
  - Municipal Council: Members: Robert T. Poculan Jr.; Cristopher G. Jutba; Paul M. Salatandre; Moody B. Palubon; John Garvey A. Catane; Al B. Manigsaca; Gerardo B. Eroy; Dennis P. Ibabao
  - Electorate: 14,229 voters (2025)

Area
  - Total: 80.03 km^{2} (30.90 sq mi)
- Elevation: 40 m (130 ft)
- Highest elevation: 220 m (720 ft)
- Lowest elevation: 9 m (30 ft)

Population (2024 census)
  - Total: 15,347
  - Density: 191.8/km^{2} (496.7/sq mi)
  - Households: 3,823

Economy
  - Income class: 4th municipal income class
  - Poverty incidence: 37.09% (2023)
  - Revenue: ₱ 113.6 million (2024)
  - Assets: ₱ 396.5 million (2024)
  - Expenditure: ₱ 58.95 million (2024)
  - Liabilities: ₱ 64.03 million (2024)

Service provider
  - Electricity: Zamboanga del Norte Electric Cooperative (ZANECO)
  - Water: Rizal Water District
- Time zone: UTC+8 (PST)
- ZIP code: 7102
- PSGC: 0907212000
- IDD : area code: +63 (0)65
- Native languages: Subanon; Cebuano; Chavacano; Tagalog
- Website: rizal.zamboangadelnorte.com

Rizal, officially the Municipality of Rizal (Cebuano: Lungsod sa Rizal; Subanen: Benwa Rizal; Chavacano: Municipalidad de Rizal; Tagalog: Bayan ng Rizal), is a municipality in the province of Zamboanga del Norte, Philippines. According to the 2024 census, it has a population of 15,347 people.

== History ==
Named after Philippine hero Jose Rizal, the town was created from the then municipality of Dapitan, province of Zamboanga on December 21, 1950 by President Elpidio Quirino through Executive Order No. 385. Rizal's earlier barrios were as follows: New Tolon (formerly Maniway, now simply Tolon), Mapang, Bongbongan, Tuayon, Sipaon, New Carcar, Singaran, Sacro, Maroc, Mitemos, Nanca-an, Tolon, Marapong Diot, Balatacan, Damasing, Sibaca, Nasipang, Mabunao and Nanka.

On May 7, 1959, through Republic Act No. 2192, the southern portion of Rizal was carved out to form the municipality of La Libertad.

== Geography ==
=== Barangays ===
Rizal is politically subdivided into 22 barangays. Each barangay consists of puroks while some have sitios.

Sitios Mercedes, San Roque, and Mauswagon became barrios in 1955.

- Balubohan
- Birayan
- Damasing
- East Poblacion
- La Esperanza
- Mabuhay
- Mabunao
- Mitimos
- Nangca
- Nangcaan
- Napilan
- Nasipang
- New Dapitan
- Nilabo
- North Mapang
- Rizalina
- San Roque
- Sebaca
- Sipaon
- South Mapang
- Tolon
- West Poblacion

=== Climate ===
Climate data for Rizal, Zamboanga del Norte
Month	Jan	Feb	Mar	Apr	May	Jun	Jul	Aug	Sep	Oct	Nov	Dec	Year
Mean daily maximum °C (°F)	27 (81)	28 (82)	29 (84)	30 (86)	30 (86)	30 (86)	30 (86)	30 (86)	30 (86)	29 (84)	29 (84)	28 (82)	29 (84)
Mean daily minimum °C (°F)	23 (73)	22 (72)	22 (72)	23 (73)	24 (75)	24 (75)	23 (73)	23 (73)	23 (73)	24 (75)	23 (73)	23 (73)	23 (73)
Average precipitation mm (inches)	69 (2.7)	44 (1.7)	37 (1.5)	29 (1.1)	87 (3.4)	137 (5.4)	131 (5.2)	141 (5.6)	143 (5.6)	134 (5.3)	68 (2.7)	53 (2.1)	1,073 (42.3)
Average rainy days	9.9	7.6	7.4	8.1	21.6	26.5	26.4	26.6	25.8	24.3	15.1	10.4	209.7
Source: Meteoblue

== Demographics ==
Population census of Rizal
Year	Pop.	±% p.a.
1960	11,477	—
1970	12,092	+0.52%
1975	12,608	+0.84%
1980	13,090	+0.75%
1990	13,115	+0.02%
1995	14,363	+1.72%
2000	13,501	−1.32%
2007	14,721	+1.20%
2010	14,111	−1.53%
2015	14,021	−0.12%
2020	15,052	+1.50%
2024	15,347	+0.47%
Source: Philippine Statistics Authority

== Economy ==
Poverty incidence of Rizal (%)

Source: Philippine Statistics Authority
