= Elly Pamatong =

Filipino lawyer and politician (1943–2021)

- Born: Elly Velez Pamatong; July 10, 1943
- Died: July 24, 2021 (aged 78); Arayat, Pampanga, Philippines
- Other names: Ragen Lao, Spike Boy, Sultan Sadar Abdullah Rijal
- Education: University of the Philippines; Silliman University
- Occupations: Lawyer, politician, activist
- Political party: Independent

Elly Velez Lao Pamatong (July 10, 1943 – July 24, 2021) was a Filipino lawyer, politician and the self-proclaimed President of the Philippines known for his attempts to participate in Philippine elections. Pamatong was declared a nuisance candidate twice for his attempted candidacy for president in 2004 and 2010 by the Commission on Elections (COMELEC).

== Legal career ==
Pamatong was a Philippine lawyer who obtained his law degree from the University of the Philippines College of Law.

The Supreme Court of the Philippines suspended Pamatong in 2016, after criticizing Judge Gregorio Pantanosas Jr. Pamatong has called on the high court to reverse the decision.

He also joined the Moro National Liberation Front (MNLF) and served as the legal counsel of MNLF founder Nur Misuari, but the MNLF later cut ties with him following the spike attacks he incited in 2004.

== Political career ==
Pamatong was accepted as a candidate in the 1987 Philippine Senate election. He got 0.01% of the vote, second-to-the-last in a field of 90 candidates.

Pamatong attempted to run for president in the 2004 and 2010 Philippine elections but his candidacy was not accepted with the COMELEC declaring him as a nuisance candidate for both elections. In 2007, he ran for the position of Governor of Pampanga but lost to Ed Panlilio.

Pamatong made it to the ballot in elections to the House of Representatives. Pamatong finished last in 2002 Zamboanga del Norte's 1st congressional district special election with just over 1% of the vote. Over a decade later, he lost in 2013 Davao City's 1st congressional district election, with less than 1% of the vote.

Pamatong would proclaim himself as president of the Philippines in 2017, disputing the leadership of President Rodrigo Duterte.

=== USAFFE ===
United States Allied Freedom Fighters of the East
- Leader: Elly Pamatong
- Founded: 2003
- Country: Philippines
- Ideology: Anti-communism
- Political position: Far-right

Elly Pamatong led his own organization called the United States Allied Freedom Fighters of the East (USAFFE; not to be confused with the United States Army Forces in the Far East). According to himself, the organization is an "anti-communist paramilitary organization" meant to oppose the New People's Army in Mindanao. The organization has been described by the media as a far-right group. Pamatong has reportedly held the title "reverend attorney general" (RAGEN) within the group. Alternatively he has been described as a "five star general" in the USAFFE.

Pamatong's USAFFE was established in 2003 and was based on a compound in Cagayan de Oro owned by Edmundo Pamintuan who was a client of Pamatong as a lawyer who led the Back to Christ Discovery Crusade group. When Pamintuan died in 2002, Pamatong recruited members of the Christ Discovery Crusade as part of his USAFFE, which he claimed to be a holdover of the original United States Army Forces in the Far East of World War II. The compound was raided in 2017 by the Martial Law Special Action Group in coordination with several other security government authorities and confiscated firearms and explosives.

The USAFFE was allegedly involved in a plot to bomb Ninoy Aquino International Airport in 2014 and Pamatong was arrested for his suspected involvement. The group also plotted to bomb the SM Mall of Asia, the Chinese Embassy and the headquarters of D.M. Consunji Inc. which employs hundreds of Chinese.

In January 2019, Pamatong burned the flags of China and Malaysia on two occasions on behalf of his group. He burned the Chinese flag as protest against the "economic colonisation" and "dismemberment" of the Philippines by the People's Republic of China. His actions towards the Malaysian flag was a protest against what he calls the "continuing invasion" of Sabah by Malaysia. The action caused diplomatic process against the Philippine government over the matter with the latter stating Pamatong's actions as not reflective of the country's official stance. Pamatong has previously been charged for declaring himself as president of the Philippines, among other criminal acts.

Since Pamatong's death, it is unclear as to who currently serves as the head of the USAFFE.

== Protests ==
Pamatong called on his supporters to spread spikes on roads as a protest against corruption of the administration of then-President Gloria Macapagal Arroyo as well as refusal of government authorities to issue he and his supporters permit to organize a rally. Spikes were spread on major roads in Metro Manila, Baguio, Bicol, Cagayan, Davao, and Laguna.

== Lawsuits filed by Pamatong ==
Pamatong has filed numerous lawsuits against high-profile individuals. Such persons include then-Pope Benedict XVI and Cardinal Gaudencio Rosales for "alleged disturbance of public order, swindling and teaching immoral doctrines." He also filed disqualification case against Lito Lapid and Manny Pacquiao who were running for the post of Senator in the 2010 Philippine elections saying that the candidates didn't have enough educational experience but the COMELEC dismissed Pamatong's petition stating that there is no need for candidates to have a high educational attainment to be eligible to run.

An outspoken critic of then-President Rodrigo Duterte, Pamatong filed a quo warranto petition before the Supreme Court in June 2018. He sought to oust Duterte, on the grounds that his certificate of candidacy in the 2016 presidential election was illegal.

== Death ==
On July 24, 2021, Pamatong died at the age of 78 due to cardiac arrest. He died in Arayat, Pampanga. Due to the request of his family, his death was only made known to the wider public when the certificate of candidacy filing for the 2022 Philippine general election began on October 1, 2021. His body was cremated and the remains were in-urned on August 1, 2021. The USAFFE, Pamatong's group, kept the urn in a chapel in Arayat.

Despite Pamatong's death, he continues to be considered as the spiritual head of the USAFFE. He is also considered a prophet in a local religious group called Immortal White Rock Church of Enoch and Elijah, Inc, a church based in Davao City.
