= Sergio Osmeña, Zamboanga del Norte =

Municipality in Zamboanga del Norte, Philippines

Sergio Osmeña
- Municipality
- Municipality of Sergio Osmeña Sr.
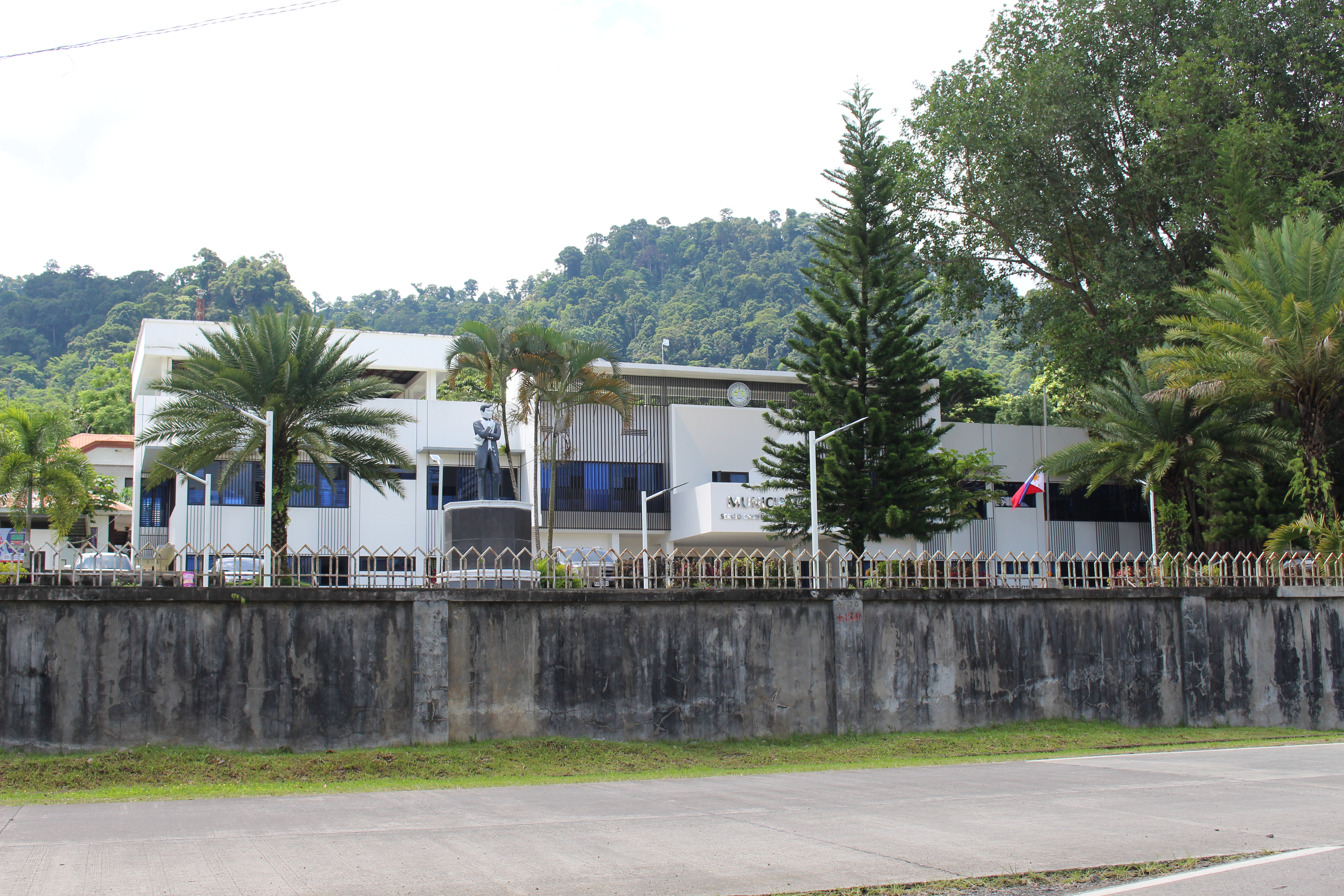
- Sergio Osmeña Municipal Hall

- Seal
- Nickname: Vegetable Bowl of Zamboanga del Norte
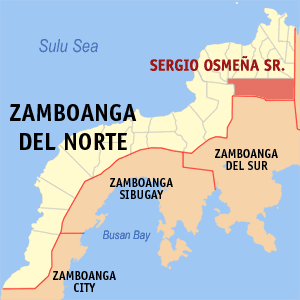
- Map of Zamboanga del Norte with Sergio Osmeña highlighted
- Interactive map of Sergio Osmeña
- Location within the Philippines
- Coordinates: 8°18′01″N 123°30′30″E
- Country: Philippines
- Region: Zamboanga Peninsula
- Province: Zamboanga del Norte
- District: 1st district
- Founded: June 22, 1963
- Named for: Sergio Osmeña
- Barangays: 39 (see Barangays)

Government
  - Type: Sangguniang Bayan
  - Mayor: Glen N. Yu (Lakas)
  - Vice Mayor: Ciddycriz C. Villamin (Lakas)
  - Representative: Roberto T. Uy Jr. (Lakas)
  - Municipal Council: Members: Ruben P. Andilab; Zosimo G. Palomares Jr.; Adolfo E. Elico; Deogracias C. Tapayan; Aldren C. Alboria; Lester B. Jumawan; Richard D. Magsalay; Renato B. Bongcawil
  - Electorate: 23,146 voters (2025)

Area
  - Total: 556.44 km^{2} (214.84 sq mi)
- Elevation: 580 m (1,900 ft)

Population (2024 census)
  - Total: 31,187
  - Density: 56.047/km^{2} (145.16/sq mi)
  - Households: 6,948

Economy
  - Income class: 1st municipal income class
  - Poverty incidence: 63.8% (2023)
  - Revenue: ₱ 271 million (2024)
  - Assets: ₱ 490 million (2024)
  - Expenditure: ₱ 116.5 million (2024)
  - Liabilities: ₱ 56.33 million (2024)

Service provider
  - Electricity: Zamboanga del Norte Electric Cooperative (ZANECO)
- Time zone: UTC+8 (PST)
- ZIP code: 7108
- PSGC: 0907214000
- IDD : area code: +63 (0)65
- Native languages: Subanon; Cebuano; Chavacano; Tagalog
- Website: municipalityofsergioosmena.wordpress.com

Sergio Osmeña, officially the Municipality of Sergio Osmeña Sr., is a municipality in the province of Zamboanga del Norte, Philippines. According to the 2024 census, it has a population of 31,187 people.

== History ==
On June 22, 1963, Republic Act No. 3697 led to the creation of the municipality of Sergio Osmeña, separating the barrios of Dampalan, Labag, Princess La Maya, Marapong, and Sibulan from the municipality of Piñan. Sibulan was designated as the seat of municipal government.

== Geography ==
=== Barangays ===
Sergio Osmeña is politically subdivided into 39 barangays. Each barangay consists of puroks while some have sitios.

- Antonino
- Bagong Baguio
- Bagumbayan
- Biayon
- Buenavista
- Dampalan
- Danao
- Don Eleno
- Kauswagan
- Labirays
- Liwanag
- Mabuhay
- Macalibre
- Mahayahay
- Marapong
- Nazareth
- Nebo
- New Rizal
- New Tangub
- Nuevavista
- Pedagan
- Penacio
- Poblacion Alto
- Poblacion Bajo
- Princesa Freshia
- Princesa Lamaya
- San Antonio
- San Francisco
- San Isidro
- San Jose
- San Juan
- Sinaad
- Sinai
- Situbo
- Tinago
- Tinindugan
- Tuburan
- Venus
- Wilben

=== Climate ===
Climate data for Sergio Osmeña, Zamboanga del Norte
Month	Jan	Feb	Mar	Apr	May	Jun	Jul	Aug	Sep	Oct	Nov	Dec	Year
Mean daily maximum °C (°F)	27 (81)	28 (82)	28 (82)	29 (84)	29 (84)	28 (82)	28 (82)	28 (82)	28 (82)	28 (82)	28 (82)	27 (81)	28 (82)
Mean daily minimum °C (°F)	22 (72)	21 (70)	21 (70)	22 (72)	23 (73)	23 (73)	22 (72)	22 (72)	23 (73)	23 (73)	22 (72)	22 (72)	22 (72)
Average precipitation mm (inches)	104 (4.1)	76 (3.0)	92 (3.6)	97 (3.8)	199 (7.8)	238 (9.4)	195 (7.7)	193 (7.6)	178 (7.0)	212 (8.3)	171 (6.7)	110 (4.3)	1,865 (73.3)
Average rainy days	14.7	12.5	15.8	17.5	27.6	28.5	29.0	27.5	26.9	27.9	23.5	18.2	269.6
Source: Meteoblue

== Demographics ==
Population census of Sergio Osmeña
Year	Pop.	±% p.a.
1970	17,300	—
1975	20,418	+3.38%
1980	22,337	+1.81%
1990	22,454	+0.05%
1995	26,014	+2.80%
2000	27,500	+1.20%
2007	29,049	+0.76%
2010	29,453	+0.50%
2015	30,220	+0.49%
2020	31,942	+1.17%
2024	31,187	−0.57%
Source: Philippine Statistics Authority

== Economy ==
Poverty incidence of Sergio Osmeña Sr. (%)

Source: Philippine Statistics Authority
