= La Libertad, Zamboanga del Norte =

Municipality in Zamboanga del Norte, Philippines

La Libertad
- Municipality
- Municipality of La Libertad
- Seal

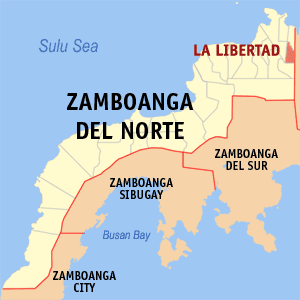
- Map of Zamboanga del Norte with La Libertad highlighted
- Interactive map of La Libertad
- Location within the Philippines
- Coordinates: 8°28′01″N 123°31′36″E
- Country: Philippines
- Region: Zamboanga Peninsula
- Province: Zamboanga del Norte
- District: 1st district
- Barangays: 13 (see Barangays)

Government
  - Type: Sangguniang Bayan
  - Mayor: Ricky R. Cuenca (Lakas)
  - Vice Mayor: Pete T. Zamora (Reporma)
  - Representative: Roberto T. Uy Jr. (Lakas)
  - Municipal Council: Members: Alvin G. Zamora; Ramon C. Aldojesa; Elmer C. Hangcan; Ben B. Omalsa; Erwin T. Clavel; Exequiel M. Molavizar; Joel L. Manlupig; Adamson T. Sumaoy
  - Electorate: 6,337 voters (2025)

Area
  - Total: 69.51 km^{2} (26.84 sq mi)
- Elevation: 182 m (597 ft)
- Highest elevation: 596 m (1,955 ft)
- Lowest elevation: 51 m (167 ft)

Population (2024 census)
  - Total: 7,874
  - Density: 113.3/km^{2} (293.4/sq mi)
  - Households: 2,314

Economy
  - Income class: 5th municipal income class, 5th municipal income class
  - Poverty incidence: 36.74% (2023)
  - Revenue: ₱ 88.31 million (2024)
  - Assets: ₱ 247.8 million (2024)
  - Expenditure: ₱ 45.04 million (2024)
  - Liabilities: ₱ 32.03 million (2024)

Service provider
  - Electricity: Zamboanga del Norte Electric Cooperative (ZANECO)
- Time zone: UTC+8 (PST)
- ZIP code: 7117
- PSGC: 0907204000
- IDD : area code: +63 (0)65
- Native languages: Subanon; Cebuano; Chavacano; Tagalog
- Website: lalibertad.gov.ph

La Libertad, officially the Municipality of La Libertad (Cebuano: Lungsod sa La Libertad; Subanen: Benwa La Libertad; Chavacano: Municipalidad de La Libertad; Tagalog: Bayan ng La Libertad), is a municipality in the province of Zamboanga del Norte, Philippines. According to the 2024 census, it has a population of 7,874 people, making it the least populated municipality in the province.

== Geography ==
=== Barangays ===
La Libertad is politically subdivided into 13 barangays. Each barangay consists of puroks while some have sitios.

- El Paraiso
- La Union
- La Victoria
- Mauswagon
- Mercedes
- New Argao
- New Bataan
- New Carcar
- Poblacion
- San Jose
- Santa Catalina
- Santa Cruz
- Singaran

=== Climate ===
Climate data for La Libertad, Zamboanga del Norte
Month	Jan	Feb	Mar	Apr	May	Jun	Jul	Aug	Sep	Oct	Nov	Dec	Year
Mean daily maximum °C (°F)	27 (81)	27 (81)	28 (82)	30 (86)	30 (86)	29 (84)	29 (84)	29 (84)	30 (86)	29 (84)	29 (84)	28 (82)	29 (84)
Mean daily minimum °C (°F)	22 (72)	22 (72)	22 (72)	23 (73)	24 (75)	24 (75)	23 (73)	23 (73)	23 (73)	23 (73)	23 (73)	22 (72)	23 (73)
Average precipitation mm (inches)	69 (2.7)	44 (1.7)	37 (1.5)	29 (1.1)	87 (3.4)	137 (5.4)	131 (5.2)	141 (5.6)	143 (5.6)	134 (5.3)	68 (2.7)	53 (2.1)	1,073 (42.3)
Average rainy days	9.9	7.6	7.4	8.1	21.6	26.5	26.4	26.6	25.8	24.3	15.1	10.4	209.7
Source: Meteoblue

== Demographics ==
Population census of La Libertad
Year	Pop.	±% p.a.
1960	5,441	—
1970	6,351	+1.56%
1975	7,026	+2.05%
1980	7,644	+1.70%
1990	7,543	−0.13%
1995	7,702	+0.39%
2000	7,419	−0.80%
2007	7,670	+0.46%
2010	7,771	+0.48%
2015	8,406	+1.51%
2020	8,119	−0.73%
2024	7,874	−0.73%
Source: Philippine Statistics Authority

== Economy ==
Poverty incidence of La Libertad (%)

Source: Philippine Statistics Authority
