= Polanco, Zamboanga del Norte =

Municipality in Zamboanga del Norte, Philippines

Polanco
- Municipality
- Municipality of Polanco
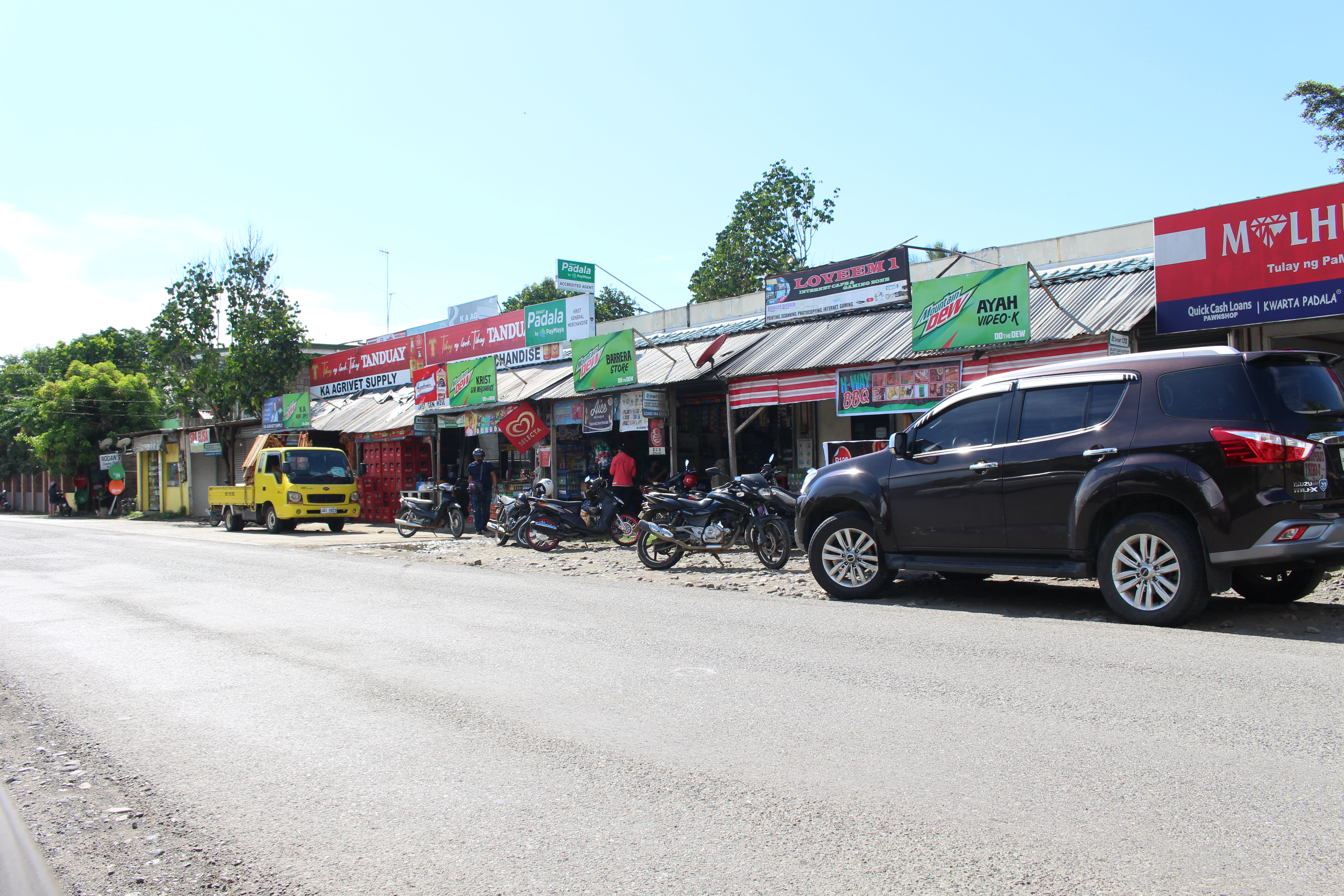
- Portion of Polanco's Poblacion

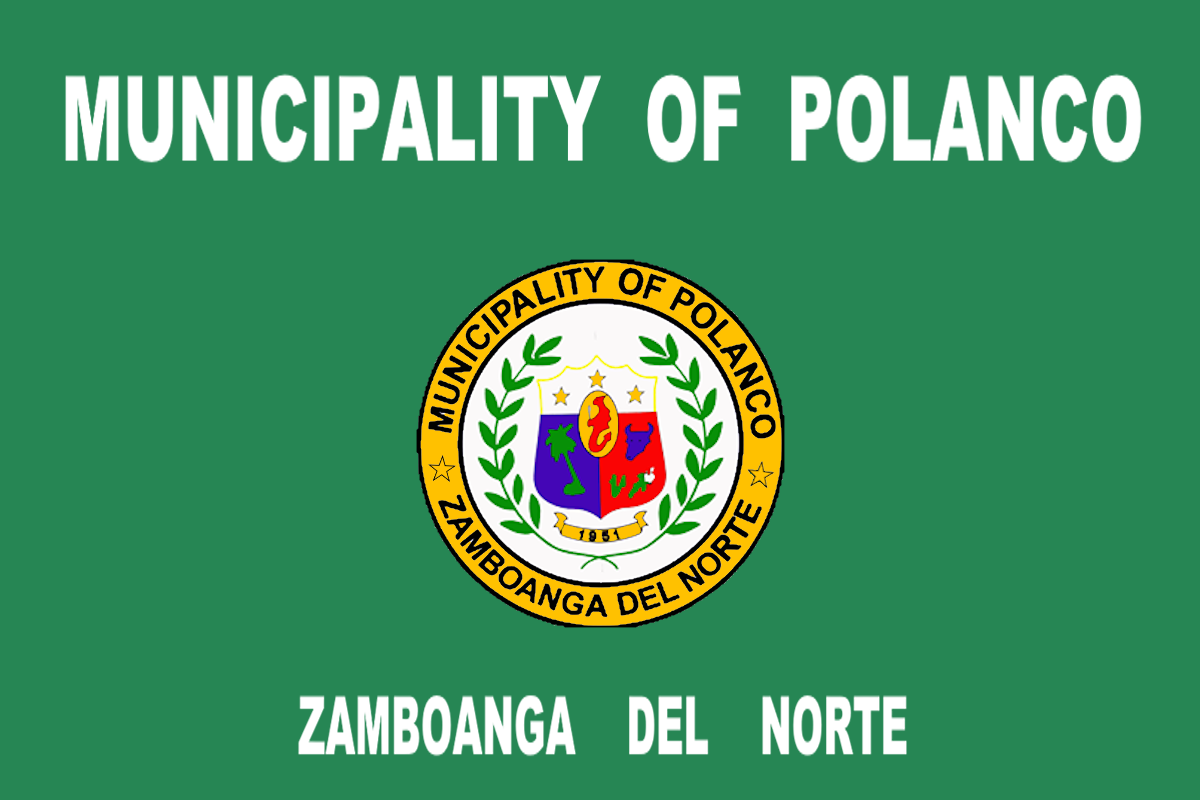
- Flag Seal
- Nickname: Marang Capital of the Philippines
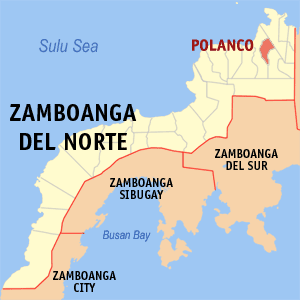
- Map of Zamboanga del Norte with Polanco highlighted
- Interactive map of Polanco
- Location within the Philippines
- Coordinates: 8°31′55″N 123°21′47″E
- Country: Philippines
- Region: Zamboanga Peninsula
- Province: Zamboanga del Norte
- District: 1st district
- Founded: 22 August 1951
- Barangays: 30 (see Barangays)

Government
  - Type: Sangguniang Bayan
  - Mayor: Shaia Ruth R. Uy (Lakas)
  - Vice Mayor: Evan Hope D. Olvis (PFP)
  - Representative: Roberto T. Uy Jr. (Lakas)
  - Municipal Council: Members: Ivo M. Mandantes; Rey Geynill R. Samonte; Jose Marion F. Repaja; Gerard Vicson S. Opulentisima; Dionisio A. Dalida; Cinderelle M. Gabucan; Alfredo S. Bait-it; Rolando P. Escuadro; Napoleon P. Adriatico (ABC); Kim Clouie Mafet P. Bait-it (SK)
  - Electorate: 31,040 voters (2025)

Area
  - Total: 206.88 km^{2} (79.88 sq mi)
- Elevation: 25 m (82 ft)
- Highest elevation: 348 m (1,142 ft)
- Lowest elevation: 0 m (0 ft)

Population (2024 census)
  - Total: 40,485
  - Density: 195.69/km^{2} (506.84/sq mi)
  - Households: 10,776

Economy
  - Income class: 1st municipal income class
  - Poverty incidence: 33.44% (2023)
  - Revenue: ₱ 219.8 million (2024)
  - Assets: ₱ 543.8 million (2024)
  - Expenditure: ₱ 81.33 million (2024)
  - Liabilities: ₱ 151.1 million (2024)

Service provider
  - Electricity: Zamboanga del Norte Electric Cooperative (ZANECO)
  - Water: Polanco Water District (PWADI)
- Time zone: UTC+8 (PST)
- ZIP code: 7106
- PSGC: 0907210000
- IDD : area code: +63 (0)65
- Native languages: Subanon; Cebuano; Chavacano; Tagalog
- Website: lgupolanco.gov.ph

Polanco, officially the Municipality of Polanco (Cebuano: Lungsod sa Polanco; Subanen: Benwa Polanco; Chavacano: Municipalidad de Polanco; Tagalog: Bayan ng Polanco), is a municipality in the province of Zamboanga del Norte, Philippines. According to the 2024 census, it has a population of 40,485 people.

Most of land of Polanco was owned by the influential family of Realiza, led by Don Gaudencio N. Realiza during the times of American regime in the Philippines. The present land they own are large parts of Labrador (Prinda), Bethlehem, Dansullan, Guinles, Macleodes, New Sicayab, New Lebangon, Sianib, South Polanco, and Obay.

== History ==
By virtue of Executive Order No. 467 signed by President Elpidio Quirino on 22 August 1951, the municipality of Polanco, along with New Piñan, was organized, separated from Dipolog in the old Zamboanga province. The municipality contains four barrios with one with the same name the seat of the government.

== Geography ==
=== Barangays ===
Polanco is politically subdivided into 30 barangays. Each barangay consists of puroks while some have sitios.

Lingasad, Silawe, Isis, and Loboc (present-day San Miguel) became barrios in 1954. In 1955, the sitios of Prenda, Balangbang, Marantaw, Tamsi, Serabang Gamay and Serabang Daku became barrio Prenda, while sitios of Bandera, Pian, Biga-an, Upper Genatulan, Lower Sinaman and Miasi became barrio Bandera.

In 1957, the sitios of Dilawa, Desin, Lambog, Gumatob, Boboringan, Tubongon, Debolok, Tiaman, Guintom, Lower Disoy, and New Tipan were converted into the barrio of Milad.

- Anastacio
- Bandera
- Bethlehem
- Dangi
- Dansullan
- De Venta Perla
- Guinles
- Isis
- Labrador (Prinda)
- Lapayanbaja
- Letapan
- Linabo
- Lingasad
- Macleodes
- Magangon
- Maligaya
- Milad
- New Lebangon
- New Sicayab
- Obay
- Pian
- Poblacion North
- Poblacion South
- San Antonio (Paetan)
- San Miguel (Loboc)
- San Pedro
- Santo Niño (Lantoy)
- Sianib
- Silawe
- Villahermosa

Sianib is a rural village (barangay) located approximately twenty minutes by highway from Polanco. Community services include both an international primary school and high school, active Catholic and Christian evangelical congregations, and a small shopping district including video karaoke with many enthusiastic local singers. Sianib is also home to Barangay Brands International, a test marketing center for retail grocery product promotion and to Comfort of Home Homes, Inc., which is a housing cooperative. Most jobs are in agriculture ranging from rice to abundant seasonal fruit production including mangosteen, rambutan, coconut and banana. Other employers include a beauty products manufacturer, sawmill and a charcoal factory.

=== Climate ===
Climate data for Polanco, Zamboanga del Norte
Month	Jan	Feb	Mar	Apr	May	Jun	Jul	Aug	Sep	Oct	Nov	Dec	Year
Mean daily maximum °C (°F)	29 (84)	29 (84)	30 (86)	31 (88)	30 (86)	30 (86)	29 (84)	30 (86)	30 (86)	29 (84)	29 (84)	29 (84)	30 (85)
Mean daily minimum °C (°F)	23 (73)	23 (73)	23 (73)	24 (75)	25 (77)	25 (77)	24 (75)	24 (75)	24 (75)	24 (75)	24 (75)	23 (73)	24 (75)
Average precipitation mm (inches)	104 (4.1)	76 (3.0)	92 (3.6)	97 (3.8)	199 (7.8)	238 (9.4)	195 (7.7)	193 (7.6)	178 (7.0)	212 (8.3)	171 (6.7)	110 (4.3)	1,865 (73.3)
Average rainy days	14.7	12.5	15.8	17.5	27.6	28.5	29.0	27.5	26.9	27.9	23.5	18.2	269.6
Source: Meteoblue

== Demographics ==
Population census of Polanco
Year	Pop.	±% p.a.
1960	19,851	—
1970	19,087	−0.39%
1975	22,308	+3.18%
1980	23,448	+1.00%
1990	27,994	+1.79%
1995	31,700	+2.36%
2000	34,557	+1.87%
2007	36,376	+0.71%
2010	37,472	+1.09%
2015	39,347	+0.93%
2020	42,265	+1.52%
2024	40,485	−1.03%
Source: Philippine Statistics Authority

== Economy ==
Poverty incidence of Polanco (%)

Source: Philippine Statistics Authority

== Notable personalities ==
- Resil Mojares (1943-2026) - Cebu City-based historian and literary critic; National Artist of the Philippines for Literature
- Pinpin Uy - municipal mayor of Polanco (2013-2026); representative, 1st District of Zamboanga del Norte (2023-present)
