= Piñan =

Municipality in Zamboanga del Norte, Philippines

- Municipality
- Municipality of Piñan
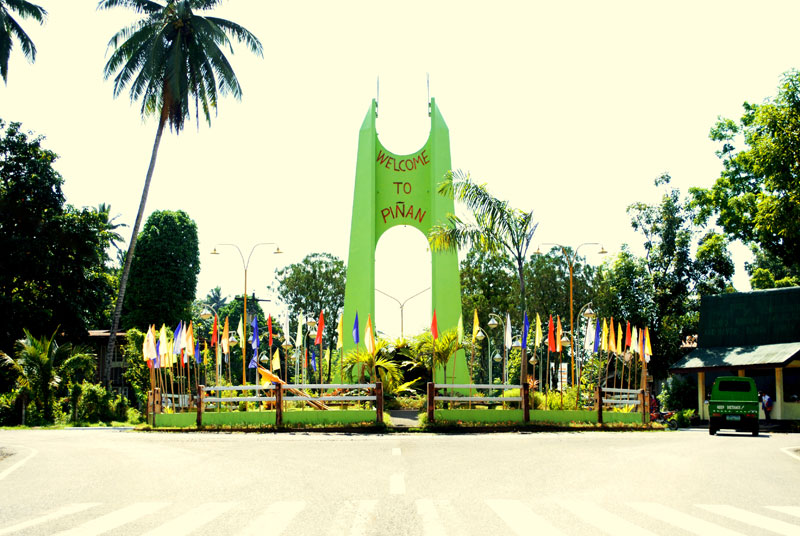
- Welcome Rotonda

- Seal
- Nickname: Pineapple Capital of Zamboanga Peninsula
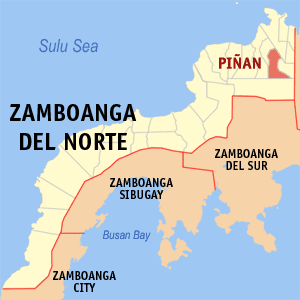
- Map of Zamboanga del Norte with Piñan highlighted
- Interactive map of Piñan
- Location within the Philippines
- Coordinates: 8°28′56″N 123°27′00″E
- Country: Philippines
- Region: Zamboanga Peninsula
- Province: Zamboanga del Norte
- District: 1st district
- Founded: August 22, 1951
- Barangays: 22 (see Barangays)

Government
  - Type: Sangguniang Bayan
  - Mayor: Rommel I. Gudmalin (Lakas)
  - Vice Mayor: Benedicto C. Cainta II (Lakas)
  - Representative: Roberto T. Uy Jr. (Lakas)
  - Municipal Council: Members: Divine Grace C. Redillas; Karl Joshua C. Orosco; Ricardo R. Sabandal; Roland M. Icao; Saturnino P. Sorronda; Gina R. Aleta; Ronald B. Dancalan; Jenelyn G. Jumilid
  - Electorate: 14,906 voters (2025)

Area
  - Total: 93.75 km^{2} (36.20 sq mi)
- Elevation: 68 m (223 ft)
- Highest elevation: 274 m (899 ft)
- Lowest elevation: 12 m (39 ft)

Population (2024 census)
  - Total: 19,184
  - Density: 204.6/km^{2} (530.0/sq mi)
  - Households: 4,965

Economy
  - Income class: 3rd municipal income class
  - Poverty incidence: 43.44% (2023)
  - Revenue: ₱ 140.5 million (2024)
  - Assets: ₱ 384.2 million (2024)
  - Expenditure: ₱ 63.08 million (2024)
  - Liabilities: ₱ 82.85 million (2024)

Service provider
  - Electricity: Zamboanga del Norte Electric Cooperative (ZANECO)
- Time zone: UTC+8 (PST)
- ZIP code: 7105
- PSGC: 0907209000
- IDD : area code: +63 (0)65
- Native languages: Subanon; Cebuano; Chavacano; Tagalog
- Website: www.pinan.gov.ph

Piñan, officially the Municipality of Piñan (Cebuano: Lungsod sa Piñan; Subanen: Benwa Piñan; Chavacano: Municipalidad de Piñan; Tagalog: Bayan ng Piñan), is a municipality in the province of Zamboanga del Norte, Philippines. According to the 2024 census, it has a population of 19,184 people.

It was formerly known as New Piñan.

== Etymology ==
Piñan came from a Subano term pinyayan which means tabuan (trading place). Before it was established as a formal settlement, this place has been a trading point between natives to the area and ambulant peddlers. In 1903, Captain Finley, a military governor in Zamboanga, established a tabuan in what is now known as Barangay Del Pilar. The tabuan became known as Piñan, and when the municipality was created it was called New Piñan to differentiate it from Piñan.

Another version states that Piñan got its name from the native word piña, a pineapple fruit that grows abundantly in this locality. Vast tracts of pineapple plantations can be seen all over the area. Because of abundance of piña fruits, natives called the place Piñan.

== History ==
The inhabitants of Piñan were engaged in farming. They cultivated their field by using the “kaingin” system, in which the land was cleared by setting fire to woody plant and bushes, after which holes were bored in the ground with pointed sticks and seeds were planted. They also used wooden plows and harrows drawn by carabaos. Then, Piñan became the source of farm production using their famous horse- or cattle-driven caretelas, and people from neighboring municipalities began coming to Piñan to purchase agricultural products and establish tabuan.

By virtue of Executive Order No. 467 signed by President Elpidio Quirino on August 22, 1951, the municipality of New Piñan, along with Polanco, was organized, separated from Dipolog in the old undivided Zamboanga province. The municipality contains sixteen sitios, organized into barrios, with one with the same name the seat of the government. It was inaugurated through the effort of Serapio J. Datoc, the then-Governor of Zamboanga, and declared as an independent municipality.

The name of the municipality was renamed Piñan through Republic Act No. 2846, enacted on June 19, 1960.

In 1963, the barrios of Dampalan, Labag, Princess La Maya, Marapong, and Sibulan were separated from Piñan to form the new independent municipality of Sergio Osmeña.

== Geography ==
=== Barangays ===
Piñan is politically subdivided into 22 barangays. Each barangay consists of puroks while some have sitios.

- Adante
- Bacuyong
- Bagong Silang
- Calican
- Del Pilar
- Desin
- Dilawa
- Dionum
- Lapu-lapu
- Lower Gumay
- Luzvilla
- Poblacion North
- Poblacion South
- Santa Fe
- Segabe
- Sikitan
- Silano
- Teresita
- Tinaytayan
- Ubay (Daan Tipan)
- Upper Gumay
- Villarico

=== Climate ===
Climate data for Piñan, Zamboanga del Norte
Month	Jan	Feb	Mar	Apr	May	Jun	Jul	Aug	Sep	Oct	Nov	Dec	Year
Mean daily maximum °C (°F)	28 (82)	29 (84)	30 (86)	31 (88)	30 (86)	29 (84)	29 (84)	29 (84)	30 (86)	29 (84)	29 (84)	29 (84)	29 (85)
Mean daily minimum °C (°F)	23 (73)	23 (73)	23 (73)	23 (73)	24 (75)	24 (75)	24 (75)	24 (75)	24 (75)	24 (75)	24 (75)	23 (73)	24 (74)
Average precipitation mm (inches)	104 (4.1)	76 (3.0)	92 (3.6)	97 (3.8)	199 (7.8)	238 (9.4)	195 (7.7)	193 (7.6)	178 (7.0)	212 (8.3)	171 (6.7)	110 (4.3)	1,865 (73.3)
Average rainy days	14.7	12.5	15.8	17.5	27.6	28.5	29.0	27.5	26.9	27.9	23.5	18.2	269.6
Source: Meteoblue

== Demographics ==
Population census of Piñan
Year	Pop.	±% p.a.
1960	24,699	—
1970	12,335	−6.70%
1975	13,121	+1.25%
1980	14,373	+1.84%
1990	15,419	+0.71%
1995	19,447	+4.44%
2000	17,950	−1.70%
2007	18,669	+0.54%
2010	20,088	+2.70%
2015	20,161	+0.07%
2020	20,221	+0.06%
2024	19,184	−1.26%
Source: Philippine Statistics Authority

== Economy ==
Poverty incidence of Piñan (%)

Source: Philippine Statistics Authority
