= Pinpin Uy =

Filipino politician from the province of Zamboanga del Norte

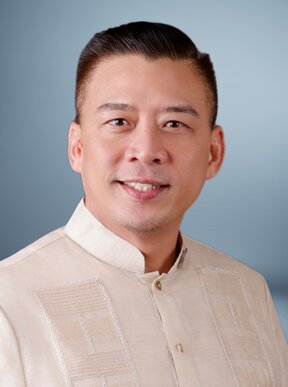
- Official portrait, 2025

Member of the Philippine House of Representatives from Zamboanga del Norte’s 1st District
- Incumbent
- Assumed office November 13, 2023
- Preceded by: Romeo Jalosjos Jr.

Mayor of Polanco, Zamboanga del Norte
- In office June 30, 2013 – June 30, 2016
- Preceded by: Jose Joy H. Olvis
- Succeeded by: Evan Hope D. Olvis

Personal details
- Born: Roberto Tan Uy Jr. August 29, 1978 (age 47) Makati, Philippines
- Party: Lakas (2023–present)
- Other political affiliations: PDP-Laban (2017–2023); Liberal (2012–2017)

Roberto Tan Uy Jr., known as Pinpin Uy (born August 29, 1978), is a Filipino politician from the province of Zamboanga del Norte, currently serving as Congressman in the House of Representatives of the Philippines representing the 1st legislative district of Zamboanga del Norte since November 13, 2023. He previously served as mayor of Polanco, Zamboanga del Norte from 2013 to 2016.

In February 2025, Uy was one of the 95 Lakas–CMD members who voted to impeach vice president Sara Duterte.

== Political career ==
In 2013, Uy entered politics when he won as municipal mayor of Polanco, Zamboanga del Norte, and served for one term until his reelection defeat in 2016. In 2019, Uy went to challenge businessman and former Zamboanga Sibugay 2nd district representative Romeo Jalosjos Jr. for the open seat of representative of Zamboanga del Norte's 1st legislative district, but was defeated.

=== 2022 elections ===
In 2022, Uy made his second attempt to challenge the then-incumbent Romeo Jalosjos Jr. for the same House of Representatives seat. By the end of the election, Uy's votes outnumbered that of Jalosjos and was about to be proclaimed as the victor of the election. However, controversy arose as then COMELEC Chairman Saidamen Pangarungan was speculated to have told Zamboanga del Norte's Provincial Board of Canvassers to suspend Uy's proclamation due to a pending disqualification case for a supposed nuisance candidate named Federico "Kuya Jan" Jalosjos. A month later, COMELEC proclaimed the incumbent Jalosjos as the winner after combining the votes of the nuisance Jalosjos with those of the incumbent, therefore increasing the vote count for the incumbent to qualify as the duly reelected representative.

On July 21, 2022, the Supreme Court of the Philippines granted the Uy camp's plea by issuing a status quo ante order to halt COMELEC's crediting of "Kuya Jan" Jalosjos's 5,424 votes to the incumbent Jalosjos, revoking their May 12 proclamation, removing the incumbent Jalosjos from his seat just before the 19th Congress opens its sessions In May 2023, Uy left PDP-Laban to join the Lakas–CMD party.

On August 9, 2023, on a 12–2 vote, the Supreme Court ruled in favor of Uy more than a year after the COMELEC proclaimed the former the winning candidate in the May 2022 elections. On November 10, 2023, COMELEC declared Uy as the legitimate winner of the election; and three days later, was sworn into office as Zamboanga del Norte's 1st district representative.

=== House of Representatives (2023–present) ===
On February 5, 2025, Uy was among the 95 Lakas–CMD members who voted to impeach vice president Sara Duterte.

== Electoral history ==
Electoral history of Pinpin Uy
| Year | Office | Party | Votes received | | | | Result |
| Year | Office | Party | Total | % | P. | Swing | Result |
|---|---|---|---|---|---|---|---|
| 2013 | Mayor of Polanco, Zamboanga del Norte | Liberal | 9,317 | —N/a | 1st | —N/a | Won |
| 2016 | Mayor of Polanco, Zamboanga del Norte | Liberal | 9,096 | 48.86% | 2nd | —N/a | Lost |
| 2019 | Representative (Zamboanga del Norte-1st) | PDP-Laban | 57,937 | 47.4% | 2nd | —N/a | Lost |
| 2022 | Representative (Zamboanga del Norte-1st) | PDP-Laban | 69,591 | 48.19% | 1st | —N/a | Won |
| 2025 | Representative (Zamboanga del Norte-1st) | Lakas | 92,806 | 58.4% | 1st | —N/a | Won |
