= 2001 Zamboanga Sibugay creation plebiscite =

Zamboanga Sibugay creation plebiscite, 2001
- February 22, 2001

Results
Choice	Votes	%
Yes	141,035	70.04%
No	60,332	29.96%
Total votes	201,367	100.00%

The Zamboanga Sibugay creation plebiscite was a plebiscite on the creation of the Province of Zamboanga Sibugay from Zamboanga del Sur province in the Philippines. The plebiscite was held on February 22, 2001, and the results were announced on February 26, 2001. The plebiscite was supervised and officiated by the COMELEC pursuant to Resolution No. 3577.

== Background ==
Attempts to create a new province from Zamboanga del Sur date as far back as the 1960s. Several bills were filed in the Philippine Congress but remained unacted until the start of the 2000s. The creation of a province named Zamboanga Sibugay was proposed by George Hofer, former Zamboanga del Sur congressman from the 3rd district. The proposed province was to compose all municipalities of Zamboanga del Sur under the 3rd legislative district at that time—Alicia, Buug, Diplahan, Imelda, Ipil, Kabasalan, Mabuhay, Malangas, Naga, Olutanga, Payao, Roseller Lim, Siay, Talusan, Titay, and Tungawan.

House Bill No. 9575, a bill proposed by Congressman Hofer, was signed into law as Republic Act No. 8973 by President Joseph Estrada and was enacted on November 7, 2000. Because of this, the province is the newest in the country, carved out from the third legislative district of the province of Zamboanga del Sur. A plebiscite was held on February 22, 2001, to ratify the law.

A majority vote of those who participated in the plebiscite was required to approve or disapprove of the creation of Zamboanga Sibugay. Registered voters of Zamboanga del Sur and Pagadian City at the time of the plebiscite were eligible to vote. The results of the plebiscite were announced by the COMELEC on February 26, 2001. 70 percent of those who voted favored the creation of the new province.

== Aftermath ==
Pursuant to Republic Act No. 8973, Ipil was designated as the capital of the new province.

== See also ==
- 2006 Dinagat Islands creation plebiscite, which created the province of Dinagat Islands out of Surigao del Norte
- 2013 Davao Occidental creation plebiscite, which created the province of Davao Occidental out of Davao del Sur
- 2022 Maguindanao division plebiscite, which divided the province of Maguindanao into two smaller provinces
