= 2022 Zamboanga Sibugay local elections =

8th local election in Zamboanga Sibugay

2022 Zamboanga Sibugay gubernatorial election
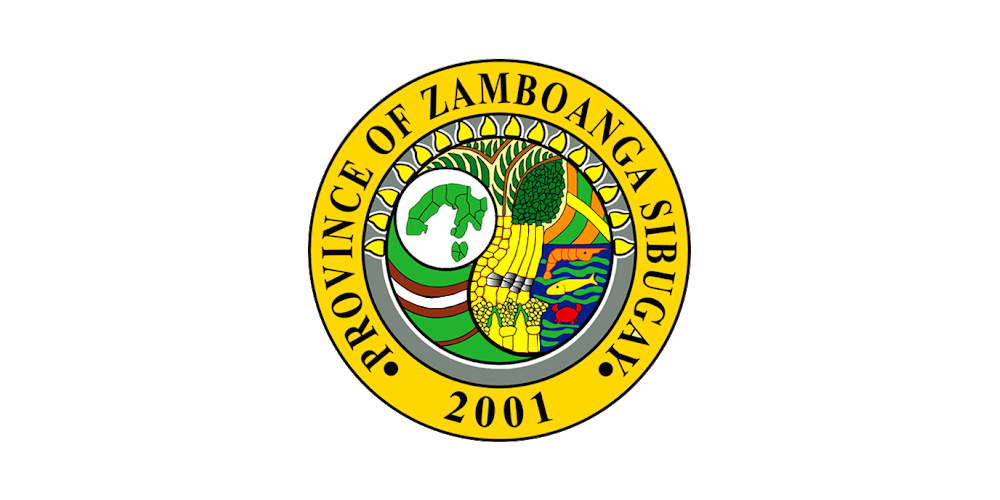
- May 9, 2022
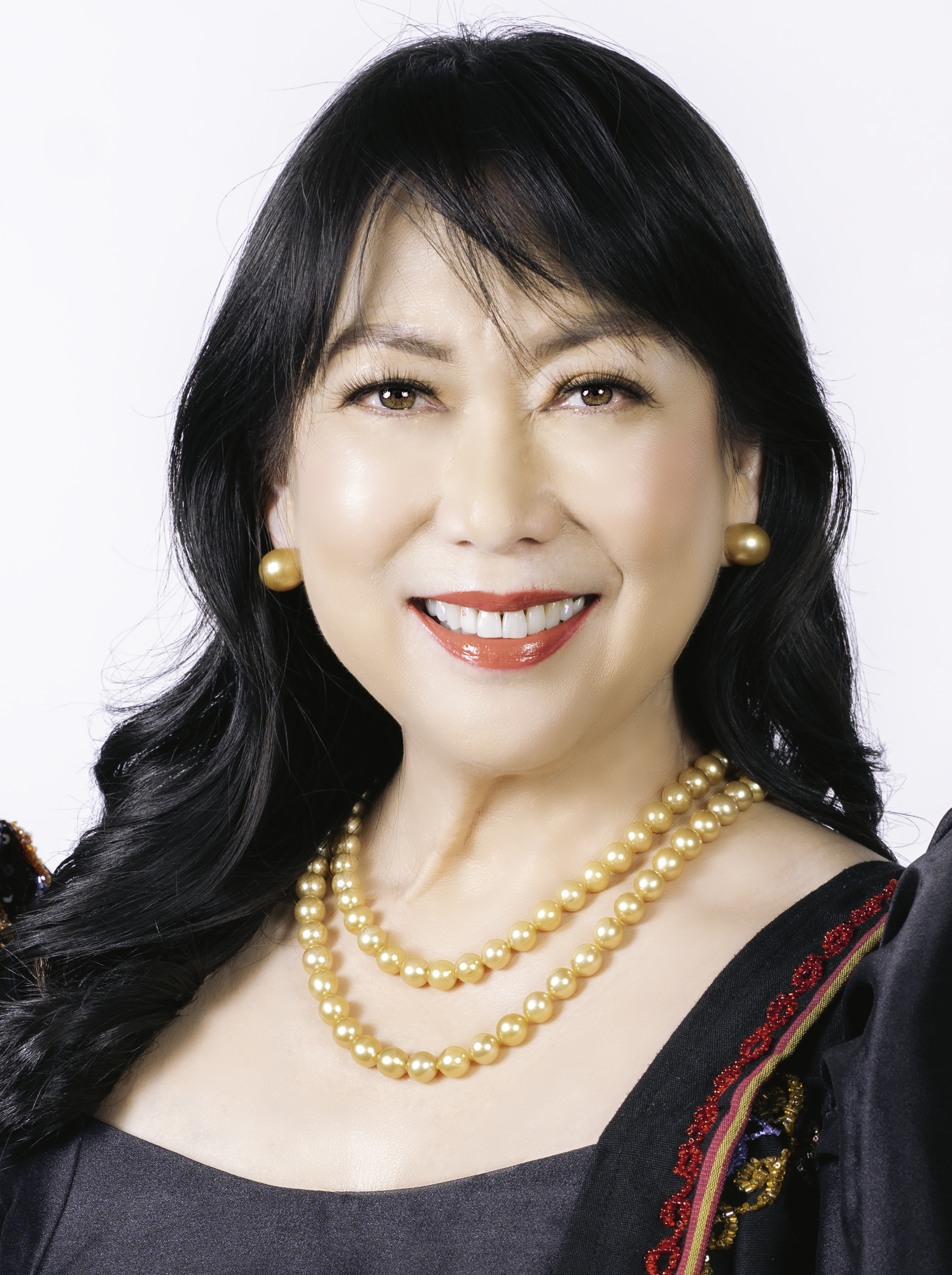

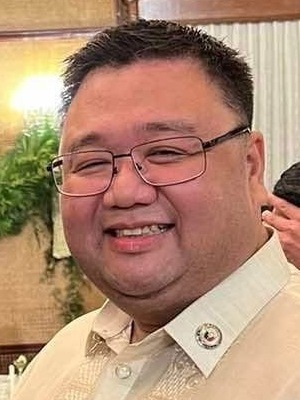
Nominee	Dulce Ann Hofer	Wilter Palma II
Party	PDP–Laban	Lakas
Running mate	Rey Andre Olegario	Jerry Lagas
Popular vote	168,373	143,539
Percentage	53.79%	45.86%
Governor before election
Wilter Palma
Lakas
Elected Governor
Dulce Ann Hofer
PDP–Laban

Local elections were held in the province of Zamboanga Sibugay of the Philippines, on May 9, 2022 as part of the 2022 general election. Voters selected candidates for all local positions: a municipal and city mayor, vice mayor and councilors, as well as members of the Sangguniang Panlalawigan, the governor, vice governor and representatives for the two Districts of Zamboanga Sibugay.

== Coalition ==
=== Administration Coalition ===
Team Hofer Olegario
#	Name	Party	Result
For Governor
1.	Dulce Ann Hofer	PDP–Laban	Won
For Vice Governor
2.	Rey Andre Olegario	Nacionalista	Won
1st District
For House of Representative
4.	Apple Yambao	PPP	Lost
For Board Member
1.	Marlo Bancoro	LDP	Won
2.	Tata Castor-Tan	PPP	Lost
6.	Roger Lu	PPP	Lost
7.	Bobby Musa	PPP	Lost
9.	Boyet Cabilao Yambao	Nacionalista	Lost
2nd District
For House of Representative
4.	George Hofer Jr.	Nacionalista	Lost
For Board Member
1.	Jet Acosta	Nacionalista	Won
4.	Chennie delos Reyes	Nacionalista	Won
8.	Rashida Loong	PDP–Laban	Lost
10.	Ric-Ric Olegario	Nacionalista	Won
12.	Judge Glenn Sabijon	Aksyon	Lost

=== Primary Opposition Coalition ===
Team Palma Lagas
#	Name	Party	Result
For Governor
2.	Wilter Palma Jr.	Lakas	Lost
For Vice Governor
1.	Jerry Lagas	Lakas	Lost
1st District
For House of Representative
1.	Wilter Palma Sr.	Lakas	Won
For Board Member
3.	Allan Escamillan	Lakas	Won
4.	Cresencio Jore	Lakas	Lost
5.	Jessie Lagas	Lakas	Won
8.	Yvonne Palma	Lakas	Won
10.	Jung-Jung Yanga	Lakas	Won
2nd District
For House of Representatives
3.	Antonieta Eudela	Lakas	Won
For Board Member
2.	Ronie Castillo	Lakas	Lost
3.	Wilborne Danda	Lakas	Lost
5.	Joel Ebol	Lakas	Lost
7.	Bella Chiong Javier	Lakas	Won
11.	Mec Rillera	Lakas	Won

=== Independent and Other Party Coalition ===
Team Independent and Other Parties
#	Name	Party	Result
For Governor
3.	Jose Policarpio Jr.	Independent	Lost
4.	Peping Tu	Independent	Lost
2nd District
For House of Representative
1.	Eldwin Alibutdan	PPP	Lost
2.	Josefino Bael	Independent	Lost
For Board Member
6.	Bonifacio Ellevera	PPP	Lost
9.	Gerald Al-Mendoza	PROMDI	Lost
13.	Leo Taras	Independent	Lost
14.	Glen Tubilan	PPP	Lost

== Provincial elections ==
All incumbents are marked in Italics.

=== Governor ===
Incumbent Governor Wilter Palma is term limited, and is prohibited from running for a fourth consecutive term. Palma opted to run for congress, and his party fielded his son Rep. Wilter "Sharky" Palma II, facing incumbent representative Dulce Ann Hofer.

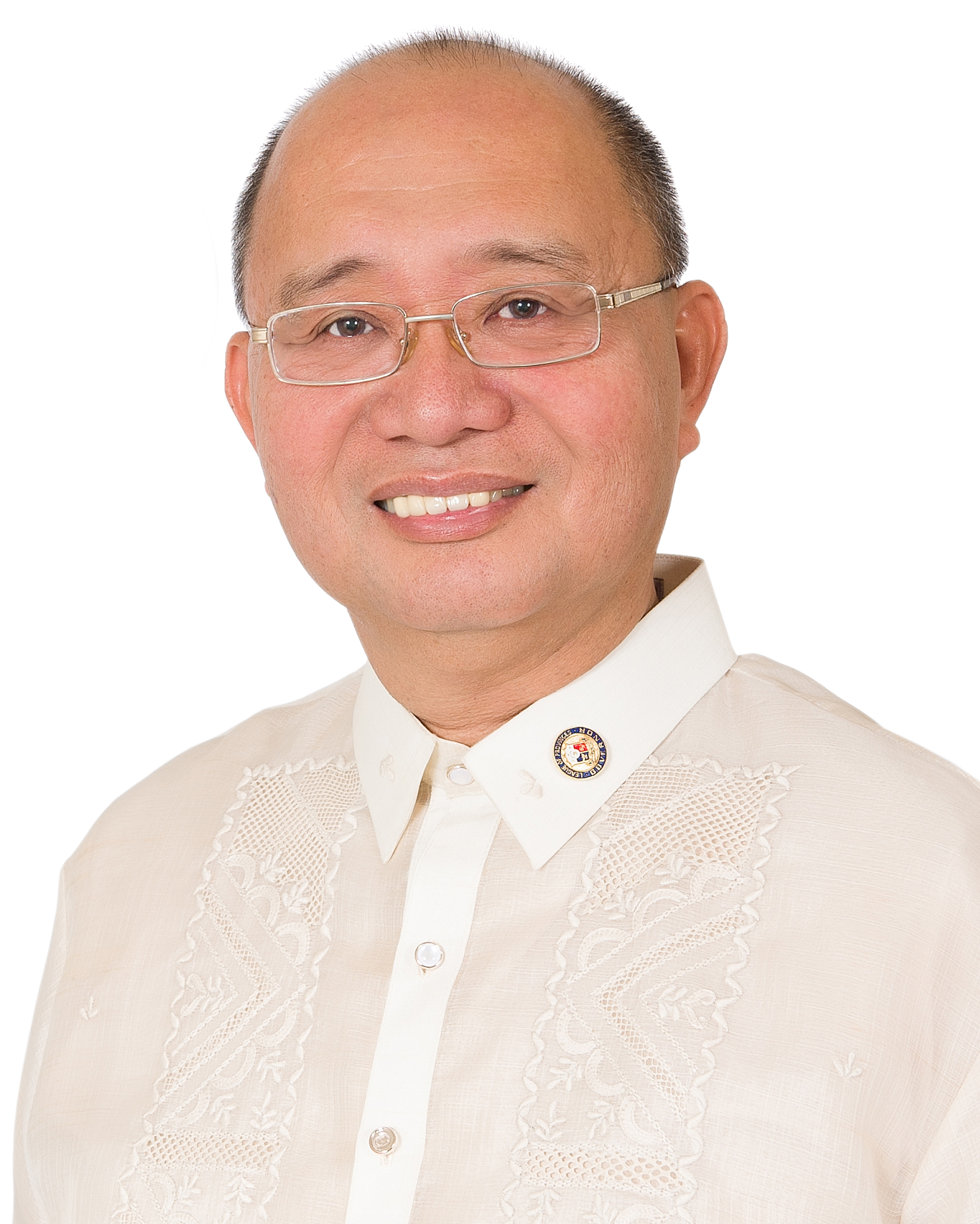
Incumbent Governor Wilter Palma is term limited

Zamboanga Sibugay Gubernatorial election
Party	Candidate	Votes	%
PDP–Laban	Dulce Ann Hofer	168,373	53.79
Lakas	Wilter "Sharky" Palma II	143,539	45.86
Independent	Jose Policarpio Jr.	763	0.24
Independent	Peping Tu	309	0.09
Total votes		312,984	100%
PDP–Laban gain from Lakas			

=== Vice governor ===
Incumbent Vice Governor Rey Andre Olegario ran for re-election.

2022 Zamboanga Sibugay Vice Gubernatorial election
Party	Candidate	Votes	%
Nacionalista	Rey Andre Olegario	166,277	62.03
Lakas	Jerry Lagas	101,753	37.96
Total votes		268,030	100%
Nacionalista hold			

=== Provincial board ===
Party	Votes	%	Seats
Lakas–CMD	569,037	47.02	6
Nacionalista Party	295,303	24.40	3
Partido Pilipino sa Pagbabago	143,999	11.90	–
Aksyon Demokratiko	68,396	5.65	–
Partido Demokratiko Pilipino-Lakas ng Bayan	62,888	5.20	–
Laban ng Demokratikong Pilipino	57,026	4.71	1
PROMDI	12,047	1.00	–
Independent	1,562	0.13	–
Ex officio seats			3
Total	1,210,258	100.00	13

=== 1st District ===
- Municipalities: Alicia, Buug, Diplahan, Imelda, Mabuhay, Malangas, Olutanga, Payao, Talusan

2022 Zamboanga Sibugay Provincial Board Election in the 1st District of Zamboanga Sibugay
Party	Candidate	Votes	%
Lakas	Yvonne Palma	61,300	11.57
Lakas	Allan Escamillan	59,991	11.32
Lakas	Jessie Lagas	59,776	11.28
Lakas	Jung-Jung Yanga	58,964	11.13
LDP	Marlo Bancoro	57,026	10.76
PPP	Tata Castor - Tan	53,443	10.08
Nacionalista	Jonathan Yambao	51,961	9.80
Lakas	Cresencio 'Cres' Jore	49,490	9.34
PPP	Bobby Musa	45,271	8.54
PPP	Roger Lu	32,493	6.13
Total votes		529,715	100%

=== 2nd District ===
- Municipalities: Ipil, Kabasalan, Naga, Roseller Lim, Siay, Titay, Tungawan

2022 Zamboanga Sibugay Provincial Board Election in the 2nd District of Zamboanga Sibugay
Party	Candidate	Votes	%
Nacionalista	Ric-Ric Olegario	87,514	12.85
Lakas	Bella Chiong Javier	84,793	12.45
Nacionalista	Jet Acosta	84,623	12.43
Nacionalista	Chennie 'Chen' delos Reyes	71,205	10.46
Lakas	Mec Rillera	70,398	10.34
Aksyon	Judge Glenn Sabijon	68,396	10.05
PDP–Laban	Rashida 'Pops Loong	62,888	9.24
Lakas	Ronie 'Nonoy' Castillo	61,004	8.96
Lakas	Joel Ebol	39,164	5.75
Lakas	Wilborne Danda	24,157	3.54
PROMDI	Gerald Al Mendoza	12,047	1.77
PPP	Glen Tubilan	8,086	1.18
PPP	Bonifacio Ellevera	4,706	0.69
Independent	Leo Taras	1,562	0.22
Total votes		680,543	100%

=== 1st District ===
Incumbent Representative Wilter "Sharky" Palma II is eligible for reelection for a third and last term but opted to run for governor. His party fielded incumbent Governor Wilter Palma.

2022 Zamboanga Sibugay Philippine House of Representatives election in the 1st District of Zamboanga Sibugay
Party	Candidate	Votes	%
Lakas	Wilter Palma	77,268	59.64
PPP	Apple Yambao	52,087	40.21
Total votes		129,537	100%
Lakas hold			

=== 2nd District ===
Incumbent Representative Dulce Ann Hofer is term limited, and is prohibited from running for a fourth consecutive term. Hofer opted to run for governor and her party fielded her brother George "Jet" Hofer II.

2022 Zamboanga Sibugay Philippine House of Representatives election in the 2nd District of Zamboanga Sibugay
Party	Candidate	Votes	%
Lakas	Ate 'Tata' Eudela	79,703	46.29
Nacionalista	George 'Jet' Hofer II	78,297	45.47
PPP	Atty. Eldwin Alibutdan	13,182	7.65
Independent	Josefino Bael	992	0.57
Total valid votes		172174	100%
Lakas gain from PDP–Laban			

== Municipal elections ==
=== 1st District ===
==== Alicia ====
Incumbent Mayor Remberto Sotto ran for re-election.

Alicia Mayoral Election
Party	Candidate	Votes	%
PPP	Alvie Musa	11,765	58.65
Lakas	Remberto Sotto	8,294	41.34
Total valid votes		20,059	100%
PPP gain from Lakas			

Incumbent Vice Mayor Rhine Tan ran for re-election.

Alicia Vice Mayoral Election
Party	Candidate	Votes	%
PPP	Jun Escamillan	10,343	54.61
Lakas	Rhine Tan	8,594	45.38
Total valid votes		18937	100%
PPP gain from Lakas			

==== Buug ====
Incumbent Mayor Dionesia Lagas ran for re-election.

Buug Mayoral Election
Party	Candidate	Votes	%
Lakas	Dionesia Lagas	12,442	64.22
PPP	Remegio Cordenillo Jr.	6,753	34.85
Independent	Eugenio Bergado	178	0.91
Total valid votes		19373	100%
Lakas hold			

Incumbent Vice Mayor Jonam Lagas ran for re-election.

Buug Vice Mayoral Election
Party	Candidate	Votes	%
Lakas	Jonam Lagas	11,485	62.20
PPP	Kuku Famor	6,504	35.22
Independent	Mirasol Romalin	473	2.56
Total votes		18,462	100%
Lakas hold			

==== Diplahan ====
Incumbent Mayor Eric Palma is ranr re-election.

Diplahan Mayoral Election
Party	Candidate	Votes	%
Lakas	Eric Palma	10,283	60.07
PPP	Orcele Macoto	6,835	39.92
Total votes		17,118	100%
Lakas hold			

Incumbent Vice Mayor Danilo Abico Sr. is eligible for re-election but opted to run for Councilor. His party fielded Ramil Villaruel as Vice Mayoral Candidate.

Diplahan Vice Mayoral Election
Party	Candidate	Votes	%
Lakas	Ramil Villaruel	10,091	60.26
PPP	Almabella Baylon	6,654	39.73
Total votes		16,745	100%
Lakas hold			

==== Imelda ====
Incumbent Mayor Inday Roselyn Silva is term limited, and is prohibited from running for a fourth consecutive term. Silva opted to run for Vice Mayor and Her party Fielded Jerry Silva as Mayoral Candidate.

Imelda Mayoral Election
Party	Candidate	Votes	%
Lakas	Jerry Silva	8,206	63.72
PPP	Tagalog Insigne	4,672	36.27
Total votes		12,878	100%
Lakas hold			

Incumbent Vice Mayor Ruth Roble is eligible for re-election but opted to run for Councilor. His party fielded Incumbent Mayor Inday Roselyn Silva as Vice Mayoral Candidate.

Imelda Vice Mayoral Election
Party	Candidate	Votes	%
Lakas	Roselyn 'Inday' Silva	8,552	68.33
PPP	Merycecil Basinang	3,962	31.66
Total votes		12,514	100%
Lakas hold			

==== Malangas ====
Incumbent Mayor Marcelo Baquial Jr. ran for re-election.

Malangas Mayoral Election
Party	Candidate	Votes	%
PPP	Marcelo Baquial Jr.	10,930	66.41
Lakas	Albert Balagon Jr.	5,527	33.58
Total votes		16,457	100%
PPP hold			

Incumbent Vice Mayor Roberto Intol ran for re-election.

Malangas Vice Mayoral Election
Party	Candidate	Votes	%
PDP–Laban	Roberto Intol	5,925	36.55
Lakas	Francisco Calamohoy	5,383	33.21
Nacionalista	Loreto 'Dodong' Banquiao	4,900	30.23
Total votes		16,208	100%
PDP–Laban hold			

==== Payao ====
Incumbent Mayor Joeper Mendoza is eligible for re-election but opted to run for Councilor. His party fielded Incumbent Councilor Joshua Mendoza as Mayoral Candidate.

Payao Mayoral Election
Party	Candidate	Votes	%
Lakas	Joshua Mendoza	13,097	79.00
PDP–Laban	Elizabeth 'Vicvic' Gubat	3,480	21.00
Total votes		16,577	100%
Lakas hold			

Incumbent Vice Mayor Joel Indino ran for re-election.

Payao Vice Mayoral Election
Party	Candidate	Votes	%
Lakas	Joel Indino	11,973	77.62
Nacionalista	Jucarnain Dacula	3,452	22.37
Total votes		15,425	100%
Lakas hold			

==== Mabuhay ====
Incumbent Mayor Indaylou Caloñge ran for re-election.

Mabuhay Mayoral Election
Party	Candidate	Votes	%
Nacionalista	Indaylou Caloñge	6,570	55.90
Lakas	Nante Toremotcha	5,183	44.09
Total votes		11,753	100%
Nacionalista hold			

Incumbent Vice Mayor Joval John Samonte ran for re-election.

Mabuhay Vice Mayoral Election
Party	Candidate	Votes	%
Nacionalista	Joval John Samonte	6,800	59.46
Lakas	Jong Jong Adlaon	4,635	40.53
Total votes		11,435	100%
Nacionalista hold			

==== Olutanga ====
Incumbent Mayor Arthur Ruste Sr. ran for re-election.

Olutanga Mayoral Election
Party	Candidate	Votes	%
Lakas	Arthur Ruste Sr.	8,338	63.24
PPP	Jhing Capotulan	4,620	35.04
Independent	Joel Autida	226	1.71
Total votes		13,184	100%
Lakas hold			

Incumbent Vice Mayor Janie Bert 'Janjan' Gumba ran for re-election.

Olutanga Vice Mayoral Election
Party	Candidate	Votes	%
Lakas	Janie Bert 'Janjan' Gumba	9,086	74.89
PPP	Fahid Sakaluran	3,045	25.10
Total votes		12,131	100%
Lakas hold			

==== Talusan ====
Incumbent Mayor Orlando Ramiso is eligible for re-election but opted to run for Vice Mayor. His party fielded Incumbent Vice Mayor Ralimson Ramiso as Mayoral Candidate.

Talusan Mayoral Election
Party	Candidate	Votes	%
Independent	Bobing Edem	4,325	53.42
Nacionalista	Ralimson Ramiso	3,521	43.49
RP	Aida Quijano	249	3.07
Total votes		8,095	100%
Independent gain from Nacionalista			

Incumbent Vice Mayor Ralimson Ramiso is eligible for re-election but opted to run for mayor. His party fielded incumbent mayor Orlando Ramiso as vice mayoral candidate.

Talusan Vice Mayoral Election
Party	Candidate	Votes	%
Nacionalista	Orlando 'Loloy' Ramiso	6,429	88.20
RP	Florencio Aringoy	860	11.79
Total votes		7,289	100%
Nacionalista hold			

=== 2nd District ===
==== Ipil ====
Incumbent mayor Inday Amy Olegario is running for re-election.

Ipil Mayoral Election
Party	Candidate	Votes	%
PRP	Inday Amy Olegario	32,264	76.46
Reporma	Roseller Briones	9,959	23.53
Total votes		42,323	100%
PRP hold			

Incumbent Vice Mayor Ramses Troy Olegario is running for re-election.

Ipil Vice Mayoral Election
Party	Candidate	Votes	%
PDP–Laban	Ramses Troy Olegario	29,043	71.15
NUP	Edward Bordner Jr.	7,591	18.59
PFP	Erning Abesamis	4,183	10.24
Total votes		40,817	100%
PDP–Laban hold			

==== Kabasalan ====
Incumbent mayor Katrina Balladares is running for re-election.

Kabasalan Mayoral Election
Party	Candidate	Votes	%
Lakas	Katrina Balladares	13,752	52.00
PROMDI	Luvly Grace Cainglet	12,278	46.43
Independent	Gia Cainglet	382	1.44
Independent	Dar Santos	30	0.11
Total votes		26,442	100%
Lakas hold			

Incumbent Vice Mayor Luvly Grace Cainglet is eligible for re-election but opted to run for mayor. Her Party fielded Incumbent SB Member Venus Alcantara.

Kabasalan Vice Mayoral Election
Party	Candidate	Votes	%
Lakas	Isagani 'Gani' Balladares	13,131	52.95
PROMDI	Venus Alcantara	9,519	38.38
Independent	Val Alcantara	1,494	6.02
Independent	Errolyn Alcantara Jr.	549	2.21
Independent	Esmond Alcantara	104	0.41
Total votes		24,797	100%
Lakas hold			

==== Naga ====
Incumbent mayor Rino Delos Reyes is running for re-election.

Naga Mayoral Election
Party	Candidate	Votes	%
PDP–Laban	Rino Delos Reyes	14,473	73.10
Lakas	Rafel Jambaro	5,325	26.89
Total votes		19,798	100%
PDP–Laban hold			

Incumbent Vice Mayor Romeo Pantag is running for re-election unopposed.

Naga Vice Mayoral Election
Party	Candidate	Votes	%
PDP–Laban	Romeo Pantag	12,534	100.00
Total votes		12,534	100%
PDP–Laban hold			

==== Roseller T. Lim (Surabay) ====
Incumbent Mayor Danilo Piodena is eligible for re-election but opted to run for Vice Mayor. His party fielded Incumbent Vice Mayor Michael Piodena as Mayoral Candidate.

Roseller T. Lim Mayoral Election
Party	Candidate	Votes	%
Nacionalista	Michael 'Papong' Piodena	17,605	81.85
WPP	Jojo Baroro	3,903	18.14
Total votes		21,508	100%
Nacionalista hold			

Incumbent Vice Mayor Michael Piodena is eligible for re-election but opted to run for mayor. His party fielded incumbent mayor Danilo Piodena as vice mayoral candidate.

Roseller T. Lim Vice Mayoral Election
Party	Candidate	Votes	%
Nacionalista	Danilo Piodena	17,041	82.26
WPP	Apple Mae Malaki	3,674	17.73
Total votes		20,715	100%
Nacionalista hold			

==== Siay ====
Incumbent Mayor Jarvis Acosta is running for re-election.

Siay Mayoral Election
Party	Candidate	Votes	%
PDP–Laban	Jarvis Acosta	13,624	65.15
Lakas	Mickel Argus	7,285	34.84
Total votes		20,909	100%
PDP–Laban hold			

Incumbent Vice Mayor Julius 'Jun-Jun' Acosta Jr. is running for re-election

Siay Vice Mayoral Election
Party	Candidate	Votes	%
UNA	Julius 'Jun-Jun' Acosta Jr.	13,347	65.08
Lakas	Danilo 'Dan-Dan' Braza	7,161	34.91
Total votes		20,508	100%
UNA hold			

==== Titay ====
Incumbent Mayor Leonardo 'Bobong' Talania is running for re-election unopposed.

Titay Mayoral Election
Party	Candidate	Votes	%
Lakas	Leonardo 'Bobong' Talania	18,890	100%
Total votes		18,890	100%
Lakas hold			

Incumbent Vice Mayor Elizer Yamaro is running for re-election unopposed.

Titay Vice Mayoral Election
Party	Candidate	Votes	%
Nacionalista	Elizer Yamaro	17,067	100%
Total votes		17,067	100%
Nacionalista hold			

==== Tungawan ====
Incumbent Mayor Carlnan Climaco is running for re-election.

Tungawan Mayoral Election
Party	Candidate	Votes	%
Lakas	Carlnan Climaco	11,598	55.36
Nacionalista	Karen Garcia	9,349	44.63
Total votes		20,947	100%
Lakas hold			

Incumbent Vice Mayor Ivan Balano is running for re-election.

Tungawan Vice Mayoral Election
Party	Candidate	Votes	%
Lakas	Ivan Balano	10,528	53.89
Nacionalista	Lorverle Caracol	9,007	46.10
Total votes		19,535	100%
Lakas hold			
