= Zamboanga Sibugay's at-large congressional district =

Legislative district of the Philippines

- Former constituency for the House of Representatives of the Philippines
- Province: Zamboanga Sibugay

Former constituency
- Created: 2000
- Abolished: 2006

Zamboanga Sibugay's at-large congressional district was the lone congressional district of the Philippines in the province of Zamboanga Sibugay for the House of Representatives from 2001 to 2007. It was created after the passage of Republic Act No. 8973 in 2000 which partitioned the province of Zamboanga del Sur and established the province of Zamboanga Sibugay. The district was represented by Belma Cabilao for the entirety of its existence. She was redistricted to Zamboanga Sibugay's 1st congressional district after the passage of Republic Act No. 9232 which abolished the district and reapportioned Zamboanga Sibugay into two congressional districts following the 2007 census.

== Representation history ==
No.	Portrait	Member	Term of office		Legislature	Party	Electoral history	Constituent LGUs
No.	Portrait	Member	Start	End	Legislature	Party	Electoral history	Constituent LGUs
District created November 7, 2000 from Zamboanga del Sur's 3rd district.
1		Belma Cabilao	June 30, 2001	June 30, 2007	12th Congress	Lakas	Elected in 2001.	2001–2007; Alicia, Buug, Diplahan, Imelda, Ipil, Kabasalan, Mabuhay, Malangas, Naga, Olutanga, Payao, Roseller T. Lim, Siay, Talusan, Titay, Tungawan
1		Belma Cabilao	June 30, 2001	June 30, 2007	13th Congress	Lakas	Re-elected in 2004. Redistricted to the 1st district.	2001–2007; Alicia, Buug, Diplahan, Imelda, Ipil, Kabasalan, Mabuhay, Malangas, Naga, Olutanga, Payao, Roseller T. Lim, Siay, Talusan, Titay, Tungawan
District dissolved into Zamboanga Sibugay's 1st and 2nd districts.

== See also ==
- Legislative districts of Zamboanga Sibugay
