= List of members of the House of Representatives of the Philippines (H) =

This is a complete list of past and present members of the House of Representatives of the Philippines whose last names begin with the letter H.

This list also includes members of the Philippine Assembly (1907–1916), the Commonwealth National Assembly (1935–1941), the Second Republic National Assembly (1943–1944) and the Batasang Pambansa (1978–1986).

== Ha ==
- Antonio Habana, member for Capiz's 1st district (1919–1922)
- Douglas Hagedorn, member for Palawan's 3rd district (2013–2016)
- Edward Hagedorn, member for Palawan's 3rd district (2022–2023)
- Teodorico Haresco Jr., member for Ang Kasangga party-list (2010–2013), Aklan (2013–2016), and Aklan's 2nd district (2019–2025)
- Mujiv Hataman, member for Anak Mindanao party-list (2003–2010), and Basilan (2019–2025)
- Hadjiman Hataman Salliman, member for Basilan (2010–2016)

== He ==
- Aurora Henson, member for Caloocan's 1st district (1992–1995)
- Jose Hernaez, member for Cebu's 1st district (1916–1919)
- Pedro Hernaez, member for Negros Occidental's 2nd district (1935–1941)
- Andres Hernandez, member for Camarines Sur (1943–1944)
- Adriano Hernandez, member for Iloilo's 4th district (1907–1909)
- Ariel Hernandez, member for Anak Mindanao party-list (2009–2010)
- Cha Hernandez, member for Calamba (2022–present)
- Dennis Hernandez, member for Rizal's 4th district (2025–present)
- Ferdinand Hernandez, member for South Cotabato's 2nd district (2013–2022, 2025–present)
- Gabriel Hernandez, member for Ambos Camarines's 1st district (1919–1922), and Camarines Norte (1934–1935)
- Paul Hernandez, member for Kabayan party-list (2018–2019)
- Ramil Hernandez, member for Laguna's 2nd district (2025–present)
- Ruth Hernandez, member for Laguna's 2nd district (2019–2025)
- Severo Hernando, member for Ilocos Norte's 1st district (1925–1931)
- Arsenio Herrera, member for Rizal's 1st district (1912–1916)
- Efren Herrera, member for Cebu's 6th district (1998–2001)
- Ernesto Herrera, member for Bohol's 1st district (1998–2001)
- Bernadette Herrera, member for Bagong Henerasyon party-list (2010–2013, 2016–2025)

== Hi ==
- Fernando Hicap, member for Anakpawis party-list (2013–2016)
- Rodolfo Hidalgo, member for Mountain Province (1934–1935)
- Carlos Hilado, member for Negros Occidental's 2nd district (1946–1957)
- Serafin Hilado, member for Negros Occidental's 1st district (1922–1928)
- Ceferino Hilario, member for Pampanga's 2nd district (1925–1928)
- Zoilo Hilario, member for Pampanga's 2nd district (1931–1934)
- Jesus Hipolito, member for Bulacan (1984–1986)
- Precious Hipolito, member for Quezon City's 2nd district (2019–2022)
- Mario Hisuler, member for Lanao del Norte's 2nd district (1994–1995)
- Joey Hizon, member for Manila's 5th district (1998–2007)

== Ho ==
- Marly Hofer–Hasim, member for Zamboanga Sibugay's 2nd district (2025–present)
- Dulce Ann Hofer, member for Zamboanga Sibugay's 2nd district (2007–2010, 2013–2022)
- George Hofer, member for Zamboanga del Sur's 3rd district (1998–2001)
- Reynaldo Honrado, member for Surigao (1953–1961), and Surigao del Norte (1961–1965)
- Agapito Hontanosas, member for Bohol (1943–1944)
- Risa Hontiveros, member for Akbayan party-list (2004–2010)
- Luis Hora, member for Mountain Province's 3rd district (1953–1969)
- Manuel Horca Jr., member for Leyte's 2nd district (1987–1992)
- Hori Horibata, member for Camarines Sur's 1st district (2022–present)
