= Zamboanga del Sur's 3rd congressional district =

Legislative district of the Philippines

Zamboanga del Sur's 3rd congressional district is an obsolete congressional district that encompassed the Sibuguey Bay region, a former territory of Zamboanga del Sur. It was represented in the House of Representatives from its creation under the ordinance annex of the 1987 Constitution of the Philippines that divided the province into three congressional districts, until 2001. The district was dissolved following the ratification of Zamboanga Sibugay's organic law of November 2000 and elected its own provincial at-large representative beginning in May 2001.

== Representation history ==
#	Image	Member	Term of office		Congress	Party	Electoral history	Constituent LGUs
#	Image	Member	Start	End	Congress	Party	Electoral history	Constituent LGUs
=== Zamboanga del Sur's 3rd district for the House of Representatives of the Philippines ===
District created February 2, 1987 from Zamboanga del Sur's at-large district.
1		Wilfredo G. Cainglet	June 30, 1987	June 30, 1992	8th	Lakas ng Bansa	Elected in 1987.	1987–2001; Alicia, Buug, Diplahan, Imelda, Ipil, Kabasalan, Mabuhay, Malangas, Naga, Olutanga, Payao, Roseller Lim, Siay, Talusan, Titay, Tungawan
1		Wilfredo G. Cainglet	June 30, 1987	June 30, 1992	8th	LDP	Elected in 1987.	1987–2001; Alicia, Buug, Diplahan, Imelda, Ipil, Kabasalan, Mabuhay, Malangas, Naga, Olutanga, Payao, Roseller Lim, Siay, Talusan, Titay, Tungawan
2		Belma Cabilao	June 30, 1992	June 30, 1998	9th	Lakas	Elected in 1992.	1987–2001; Alicia, Buug, Diplahan, Imelda, Ipil, Kabasalan, Mabuhay, Malangas, Naga, Olutanga, Payao, Roseller Lim, Siay, Talusan, Titay, Tungawan
2		Belma Cabilao	June 30, 1992	June 30, 1998	10th	Lakas	Re-elected in 1995.	1987–2001; Alicia, Buug, Diplahan, Imelda, Ipil, Kabasalan, Mabuhay, Malangas, Naga, Olutanga, Payao, Roseller Lim, Siay, Talusan, Titay, Tungawan
3		George T. Hofer	June 30, 1998	February 22, 2001	11th	LAMMP	Elected in 1998.	1987–2001; Alicia, Buug, Diplahan, Imelda, Ipil, Kabasalan, Mabuhay, Malangas, Naga, Olutanga, Payao, Roseller Lim, Siay, Talusan, Titay, Tungawan
District dissolved into Zamboanga Sibugay's at-large district.

== See also ==
- Legislative districts of Zamboanga del Sur
