= Zamboanga Sibugay's 1st congressional district =

Legislative district of the Philippines

- Constituency for the House of Representatives of the Philippines
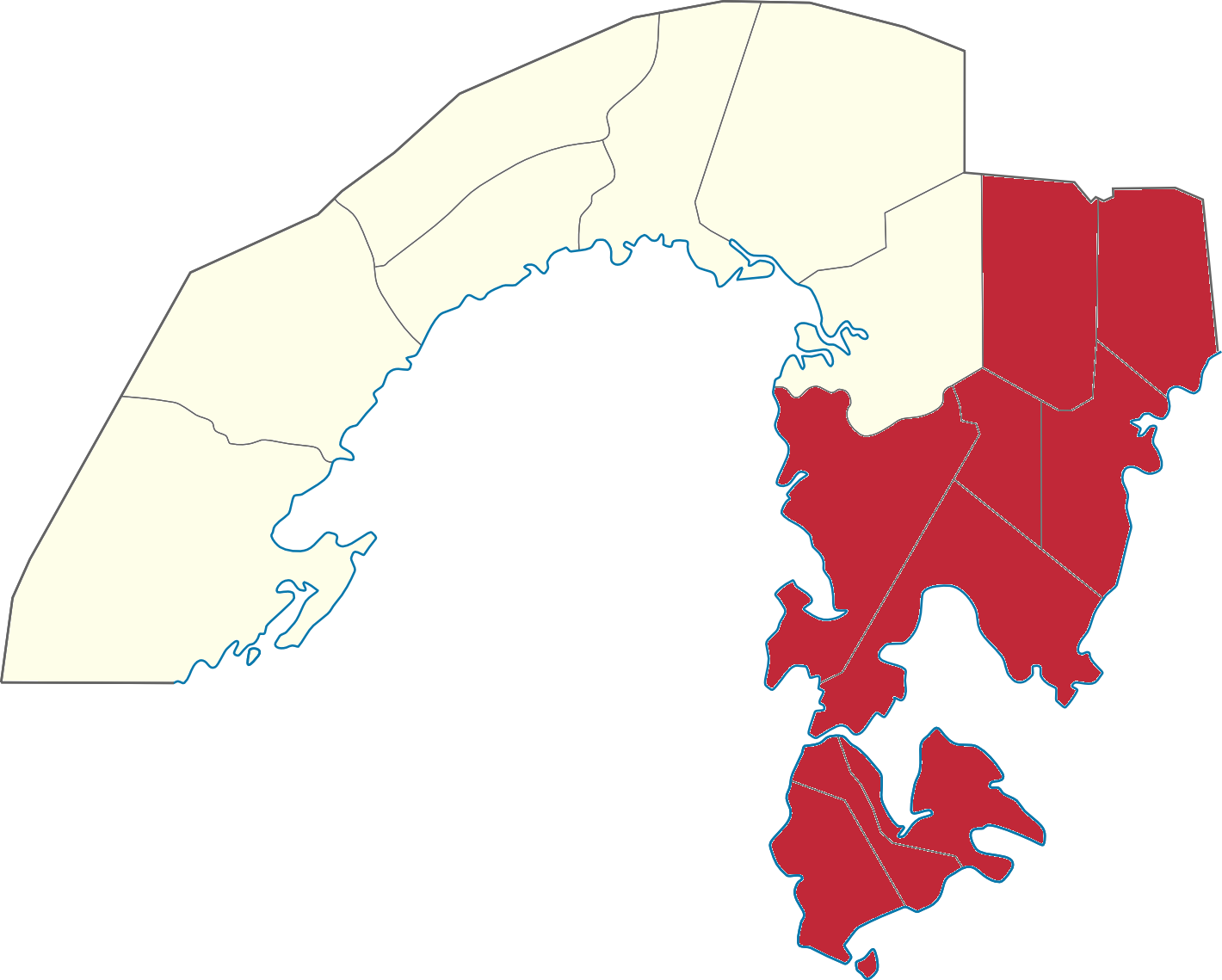
- Boundary of Zamboanga Sibugay's 1st congressional district in Zamboanga Sibugay

- Location of Zamboanga Sibugay within the Philippines
- Province: Zamboanga Sibugay
- Region: Zamboanga Peninsula
- Population: 307,161 (2020)
- Electorate: 170,321 (2019)
- Major settlements: 9 LGUs: Municipalities; Alicia; Buug; Diplahan; Imelda; Mabuhay; Malangas; Olutanga; Payao; Talusan
- Area: 1,393.27 km^{2} (537.94 sq mi)

Current constituency
- Created: 2006
- Representative: Marlo Bancoro
- Political party: PFP
- Congressional bloc: Majority

Zamboanga Sibugay's 1st congressional district is one of the two congressional districts of the Philippines in the province of Zamboanga Sibugay. It has been represented in the House of Representatives since 2007. It was created after the 2006 reapportionment that divided the province into two congressional districts. The district is composed of the eastern municipalities of Alicia, Buug, Diplahan, Imelda, Mabuhay, Malangas, Olutanga, Payao and Talusan. It is currently represented in the 20th Congress by Marlo Bancoro of Partido Federal ng Pilipinas.

== Recent election results from province-wide races ==
Year	Office	Results
2022	President	Bongbong Marcos (PFP) 61.66%
2022	Vice President	Sara Duterte (Lakas) 79.68%
2022	Governor	Wilter Palma II (Lakas) 53.80%
2025	Governor	Dulce Ann Hofer (PFP) 58.94%

== List of members representing the district ==
=== House of Representatives (1987–present) ===
No.	Portrait	Member (Lifespan)	Term of office	Party	Legislature	Electoral history	Constituencies
District created July 24, 2006 from Zamboanga Sibugay's at-large district.
1		Belma Cabilao (born 1942)	June 30, 2007 – June 30, 2010	Lakas	14th Congress	Elected in 2007.	2007–present Alicia, Buug, Diplahan, Imelda, Mabuhay, Malangas, Olutanga, Payao, Talusan
2		Jonathan Yambao	June 30, 2010 – June 30, 2013	Nacionalista	15th Congress	Elected in 2010.	2007–present Alicia, Buug, Diplahan, Imelda, Mabuhay, Malangas, Olutanga, Payao, Talusan
(1)		Belma Cabilao (born 1942)	June 30, 2013 – June 30, 2016	Nacionalista	16th Congress	Elected in 2013.	2007–present Alicia, Buug, Diplahan, Imelda, Mabuhay, Malangas, Olutanga, Payao, Talusan
3		Wilter Palma II (born 1982)	June 30, 2016 – June 30, 2022	PDP–Laban	17th Congress	Elected in 2016.	2007–present Alicia, Buug, Diplahan, Imelda, Mabuhay, Malangas, Olutanga, Payao, Talusan
3		Wilter Palma II (born 1982)	June 30, 2016 – June 30, 2022	Lakas	18th Congress	Re-elected in 2019.	2007–present Alicia, Buug, Diplahan, Imelda, Mabuhay, Malangas, Olutanga, Payao, Talusan
4		Wilter Palma Sr. (born 1958)	June 30, 2022 – June 30, 2025	Lakas	19th Congress	Elected in 2022.	2007–present Alicia, Buug, Diplahan, Imelda, Mabuhay, Malangas, Olutanga, Payao, Talusan
5		Marlo Bancoro (born 1974)	June 30, 2025 – present	PFP	20th Congress	Elected in 2025.	2007–present Alicia, Buug, Diplahan, Imelda, Mabuhay, Malangas, Olutanga, Payao, Talusan

== Election results ==
=== 2019 ===
2019 Philippine House of Representatives elections in Zamboanga Sibugay
Party	Candidate	Votes	%
PDP–Laban	Wilter Palma II	61,142	54.44
Nacionalista	Apple Yambao	48,506	43.19
Independent	Omar Karim	2,349	2.09
Independent	Reynaldo Tecechian	313	0.28
Total votes		112,310	100.00
PDP–Laban gain from Nacionalista			

=== 2022 ===
2022 Philippine House of Representatives elections in Zamboanga Sibugay
Party	Candidate	Votes	%
Lakas	Wilter Palma Sr.	77,268	59.65
PPP	Apple Yambao	52,269	40.35
Total votes		129,537	100.00
Lakas hold			

=== 2025 ===
2025 Philippine House of Representatives elections in Zamboanga Sibugay
Party	Candidate	Votes	%
PFP	Marlo Bancoro	81,915	55.98
Lakas	Wilter Palma Sr. (incumbent)	77,268	44.02
Total votes		146,330	100.00
PFP gain from Lakas			

== See also ==
- Legislative districts of Zamboanga Sibugay
