= Legislative districts of Zamboanga Sibugay =

Legislative district of the Philippines

The legislative districts of Zamboanga Sibugay are the representations of the province of Zamboanga Sibugay in the Congress of the Philippines. The province is currently represented in the lower house of the Congress through its first and second congressional districts.

== History ==
Prior to gaining separate representation, areas now under the jurisdiction of Zamboanga Sibugay were represented under the Department of Mindanao and Sulu (1917–1935), the historical Zamboanga Province (1935–1953), Region IX (1978–1984) and Zamboanga del Sur (1953–1972; 1984–2001).

The passage of Republic Act No. 8973 on November 7, 2000, and its subsequent ratification by plebiscite on February 22, 2001, separated the entire third district of Zamboanga del Sur to form the new province of Zamboanga Sibugay. Zamboanga del Sur's former third district automatically became the representation of Zamboanga Sibugay upon its establishment in February 2001, but the new province only elected a representative under its own name beginning in the May 2001 elections.

The enactment of Republic Act No. 9360 on October 26, 2006, increased Zamboanga Sibugay's representation by reapportioning the province into two congressional districts, which began to elect their separate representatives in the 2007 elections.

== Current districts ==
Zamboanga Sibugay's current congressional delegation is composed of two members.

PFP (2)

Legislative districts and representatives of Zamboanga Sibugay
District	Current Representative		Party	Constituent LGUs	Population (2020)	Area	Map
District	Image	Name	Party	Constituent LGUs	Population (2020)	Area	Map
1st		Marlo Bancoro (since 2025); Malangas	PFP	List: Alicia; Buug; Diplahan; Imelda; Mabuhay; Malangas; Olutanga; Payao; Talusan	307,161	1,393.27 km²	
2nd		Marly Hofer–Hasim (since 2025); Ipil	PFP	List: Ipil; Kabasalan; Naga; Roseller Lim; Siay; Titay; Tungawan	362,679	2,214.48 km²	

== Lone District (defunct) ==
Period	Representative
12th Congress; 2001–2004	Belma Cabilao
13th Congress; 2004–2007	Belma Cabilao

== See also ==
- Legislative district of Mindanao and Sulu
- Legislative district of Zamboanga
- Legislative districts of Zamboanga del Sur
