= Jon-jon Jalosjos =

Filipino businessman and politician (born 1971)

Romeo Jalosjos Jr.
- Jalosjos in 2021

Member of the Philippine House of Representatives from Zamboanga del Norte's 1st district
- In office June 30, 2019 – July 21, 2022
- Preceded by: Bullet Jalosjos
- Succeeded by: Roberto Uy Jr.

Member of the Philippine House of Representatives from Zamboanga Sibugay's 2nd district
- In office June 30, 2010 – June 30, 2013
- Preceded by: Dulce Ann Hofer
- Succeeded by: Dulce Ann Hofer

Mayor of Tampilisan
- In office June 30, 2007 – June 30, 2010
- Vice Mayor: Enriquieta D. Bomediano
- Preceded by: Angeles R. Carloto II
- Succeeded by: Enriquieta D. Bomediano

Personal details
- Born: Romeo Masupil Jalosjos Jr. November 4, 1971 (age 54)
- Party: Nacionalista (2009–present); APP (local party; 2009–present)
- Other political affiliations: Lakas (2008–2009); KAMPI (2007–2008)
- Spouse: Marjorie Nepomuceno
- Relations: Romeo Jalosjos Sr. (father); Adelaida Masupil (mother); Lana Jalosjos (half-sister); Bullet Jalosjos (half-brother)
- Nickname: Jon-jon

Romeo "Jon-jon" Masupil Jalosjos Jr. (born November 4, 1971) is a Filipino businessman and politician from the province of Zamboanga del Norte. He served as representative for the 1st district of Zamboanga del Norte from 2019 until his removal from the post in 2022.

== Early life and political career ==
He is the son of the convicted child rapist Romeo G. Jalosjos, who was convicted by RTC Judge Roberto Diokno and later by the Supreme Court despite claims of parliamentary privilege from arrest as a congressman.

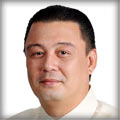
Portrait during the 15th Congress

Jalosjos ran and won as mayor of Tampilisan, Zamboanga del Norte in the 2007 local elections. In 2010, he ran for and won as a representative of Zamboanga Sibugay's second legislative district defeating incumbent representative Dulce Ann Hofer, daughter of Governor George Hofer. In 2013, he ran for re-election against Ann Hofer again, but was defeated. In 2016, he ran for governor of that province against incumbent governor Wilter Palma, but was defeated. In 2019, he ran for and won as a representative of Zamboanga del Norte's first legislative district to succeed the incumbent Bullet Jalosjos.

=== House of Representatives ===
In the 18th Congress, he was currently one of the vice chairpersons of the House Committee on Appropriations, and a member of the House Committee on Civil Service and Professional Regulation.

He was re-elected in the May 9, 2022 election. However, on July 21, the Supreme Court issued a status quo ante order after his challenger Roberto Uy Jr. protested the election results and the disqualification of nuisance candidate Federico Jalosjos (not related to Romeo Jr.), whose votes were added to the representative's total votes, on June 7. Thus, he vacated his seat before the start of the 19th Congress.

== Business career ==
Apart from other business ventures within his family, Jalosjos also serves as President and Chief Executive Officer of Television and Production Exponents (TAPE) Inc., then-producer of the longest-running noontime variety show Eat Bulaga! after Tony Tuviera's forced retirement in March 2023.

In 2023, he and his brother Bullet were linked in the internal rift between TAPE and Eat Bulaga!'s main hosts Tito Sotto, Vic Sotto, and Joey de Leon, which led to their abrupt departure from the company, but not leaving Eat Bulaga! itself, on May 31, 2023.

In 2024, Jalosjos Jr. steps down as President and Chief Executive Officer of Television and Production Exponents (TAPE) Inc. and succeeded by Malou Choa-Fagar. Choa-Fagar then headed the government-run PTV-4, meanwhile Jalosjos Jr returned to his post as President and CEO of TAPE Inc. before the company was liquidated by the government in November 2025.

== Personal life ==
Jalosjos is married to Marjorie Nepomuceno Jalosjos, who served as barangay captain of Barangay Patawag, Liloy, Zamboanga del Norte, president of the Liga ng mga Barangay Zamboanga Peninsula, and currently as Assistant Secretary for Special Concerns of the Department of the Interior and Local Government.

Their son, Romeo "Potz" Flores Jalosjos III was known as the first evictee of PBB: Teen Clash 2010.

== Electoral history ==
=== 2022 ===
2022 Philippine House of Representatives election in the 1st District of Zamboanga del Norte
Party	Candidate	Votes	%
PDP–Laban	Roberto "Pinpin" Uy Jr.	69,591	48.19
Nacionalista	Romeo "Jonjon" Jalosjos Jr. (incumbent)	69,109	47.86
NUP	Frederico "Kuya Jan" Jalosjos	5,424	3.76
PPM	Richard Amazon	288	0.19
Total votes		144,412	100.00
PDP–Laban gain from Nacionalista			

=== 2019 ===
2019 Philippine House of Representatives election in the 1st District of Zamboanga del Norte
Party	Candidate	Votes	%
Nacionalista	Romeo "Jonjon" Jalosjos, Jr.	64,282	
PDP–Laban	Roberto "Pinpin" Uy, Jr.	57,937	
Total votes			
Nacionalista hold			

=== 2016 ===
2016 Zamboanga Sibugay gubernatorial election
Party	Candidate	Votes	%
Liberal	Wilter Palma (incumbent)	139,540	
Nacionalista	Romeo Jalosjos, Jr.	95,990	
Independent	Joel Brito	915	
Independent	Gerryboy Benedicto	905	
NUP	Jaime Natividad	624	
Total votes		237,924	100.00

=== 2013 ===
2013 Philippine House of Representatives election at Zamboanga Sibugay's 2nd district
Party	Candidate	Votes	%
Liberal	Dulce Ann Hofer	57,511	58.80
Nacionalista	Jon-jon Jalosjos	40,298	41.20
Total votes		97,809	100.00
Liberal gain from Nacionalista			

=== 2010 ===
2010 Philippine House of Representatives election at Zamboanga Sibugay's 2nd district
Party	Candidate	Votes	%
Nacionalista	Romeo Jalosjos, Jr.	65,909	50.53
Lakas–Kampi	George Hofer II	63,493	48.68
Independent	Moises Abellano, Sr.	595	0.46
Liberal	Noe Barbadillo	445	0.34
Valid ballots		130,442	94.48
Invalid or blank votes		7,627	5.52
Total votes		138,069	100.00

House of Representatives of the Philippines
Preceded by Seth Frederick P. Jalosjos	Representative, 1st District of Zamboanga del Norte; 2019-present	Succeeded by Roberto Uy,Jr.
Preceded by Dulce Ann K. Hofer	Representative, 2nd District of Zamboanga Sibugay; 2010-2013	Succeeded by Dulce Ann K. Hofer
Political offices
Preceded by Julius D. Bomediano	Mayor of Tampilisan, Zamboanga del Norte; 2007-2010	Succeeded by Enriquieta D. Bomediano
Media offices
Preceded by Antonio P. Tuviera	President and Chief Executive Officer of Television and Production Exponents Inc. 2023-2024	Succeeded by Michael Tuviera
Preceded by Romeo Jalosjos Sr.	Chairman of Television and Production Exponents Inc. 2024-2025	Succeeded by
