= George T. Hofer =

Filipino politician and founder of Zamboanga Sibugay (1938-2019)

George Hofer

1st Governor of Zamboanga Sibugay
- In office February 22, 2001 – June 30, 2010
- Vice Governor: Eugenio Famor (2001–2004); Eric Cabarios (2004–2007); Rey Andre Olegario (2007–2010)
- Preceded by: Position established
- Succeeded by: Rommel Jalosjos

Member of the Philippine House of Representatives from Zamboanga del Sur's 3rd district
- In office June 30, 1998 – June 30, 2001
- Preceded by: Belma Cabilao
- Succeeded by: Position abolished (District dissolved into Zamboanga Sibugay's at-large congressional district.)

Mayor of Titay, Zamboanga Sibugay
- In office June 30, 1992 – June 30, 1998
- Preceded by: Unknown
- Succeeded by: Unknown

Personal details
- Born: George Tocao Hofer; February 26, 1938 Malabang, Lanao, Philippine Commonwealth
- Died: January 6, 2019 (aged 80) Cebu City, Cebu, Philippines
- Resting place: George T. Hofer Park, Barangay Bangko, Titay
- Party: Lakas-Kampi (2010)
- Other political affiliations: LDP (2004-2010); Kampi (2001-2004); LAMMP (1998-2001)
- Spouse: Dulce K. Hofer
- Relations: Marly Hofer-Hasim (niece)
- Children: 3 (including Dulce Ann)
- Education: Far Eastern University (BS); Southwestern University (MD)
- Occupation: Politician
- Profession: Physician

George Tocao Hofer Sr. (February 26, 1938 – January 6, 2019) was a Filipino politician and physician who founded the province of Zamboanga Sibugay in 2001 and served as its 1st Governor from 2001 to 2010.

== Early life and education ==
George Tocao Hofer was born on February 26, 1938 in Malabang in the then-united Lanao province (now part of Lanao del Sur) in the Philippines and took preparatory medicine at the Far Eastern University and went to Southwestern University to get his medical degree. Hofer is of German and Spanish blood, he also has a sister named Marlene.

== Political career ==
=== Pre-governorship ===
Hofer was elected as mayor of Titay, Zamboanga del Sur (now Zamboanga Sibugay) in 1992, and was re-elected in 1995 and 1998. Hofer being term limited, ran and won as House Representative of Zamboanga del Sur's 3rd congressional district. As congressman, Hofer pushed to separate his district from Zamboanga del Sur to make a new province, and on November 7, 2000, President Joseph Estrada signed Republic Act (R.A) No. 8973, forming the province of Zamboanga Sibugay and on February 22, 2001, the Republic Act was ratified and Hofer was appointed as the first Governor of Zamboanga Sibugay.

=== Governor of Zamboanga Sibugay (2001-2010) ===
Hofer was officially elected as the governor of the province in 2001 and was re-elected in 2004 and 2007, On April 6, 2010, a radio stationed owned by Hofer was bombed. After being term-limited, Hofer's daughter, then representative Dulce Ann ran in 2010 to replace him but was defeated by Rommel Jalosjos, son of former Zamboanga del Norte representative and convicted child rapist Romeo Jalosjos Sr. Hofer ran for the mayor of the Zamboanga Sibugay's capital Ipil but lost, Hofer retired from politics in 2010.

=== Post-governorship and death ===
Hofer lived a quiet life until he death on January 6, 2019 in Cebu City, Philippines. His funeral was held at St Joseph the Worker Parish Cathedral and was buried at George T. Hofer Park of barangay Bangko, Titay.

== Personal life ==
Hofer married doctor Dulce Kintanar and had 3 kids with her. His 3 kids are Marieta, George "Jet" II, and Dulce Ann. Dulce Ann is the 4th and current governor of Zamboanga Sibugay after being elected in 2022 and 2025. George II attempted to dive into politics by running for representative of Zamboanga Sibugay's 2nd district in 2010 but lost to Jon-jon Jalosjos, he ran for governor against Wilter Palma in 2019 but lost. He ran again as representative in 2022 but lost to Antonieta Eudela. Hofer is also the maternal uncle of incumbent Zamboanga Sibugay's 2nd district representative Marly Hofer–Hasim.
