= Governor of Zamboanga Sibugay =

Local chief executive

- Gobernador ng Lalawigan ng Zamboanga Sibugay (in Tagalog); Gobernador sa Zamboanga Sibugay (in Cebuano)
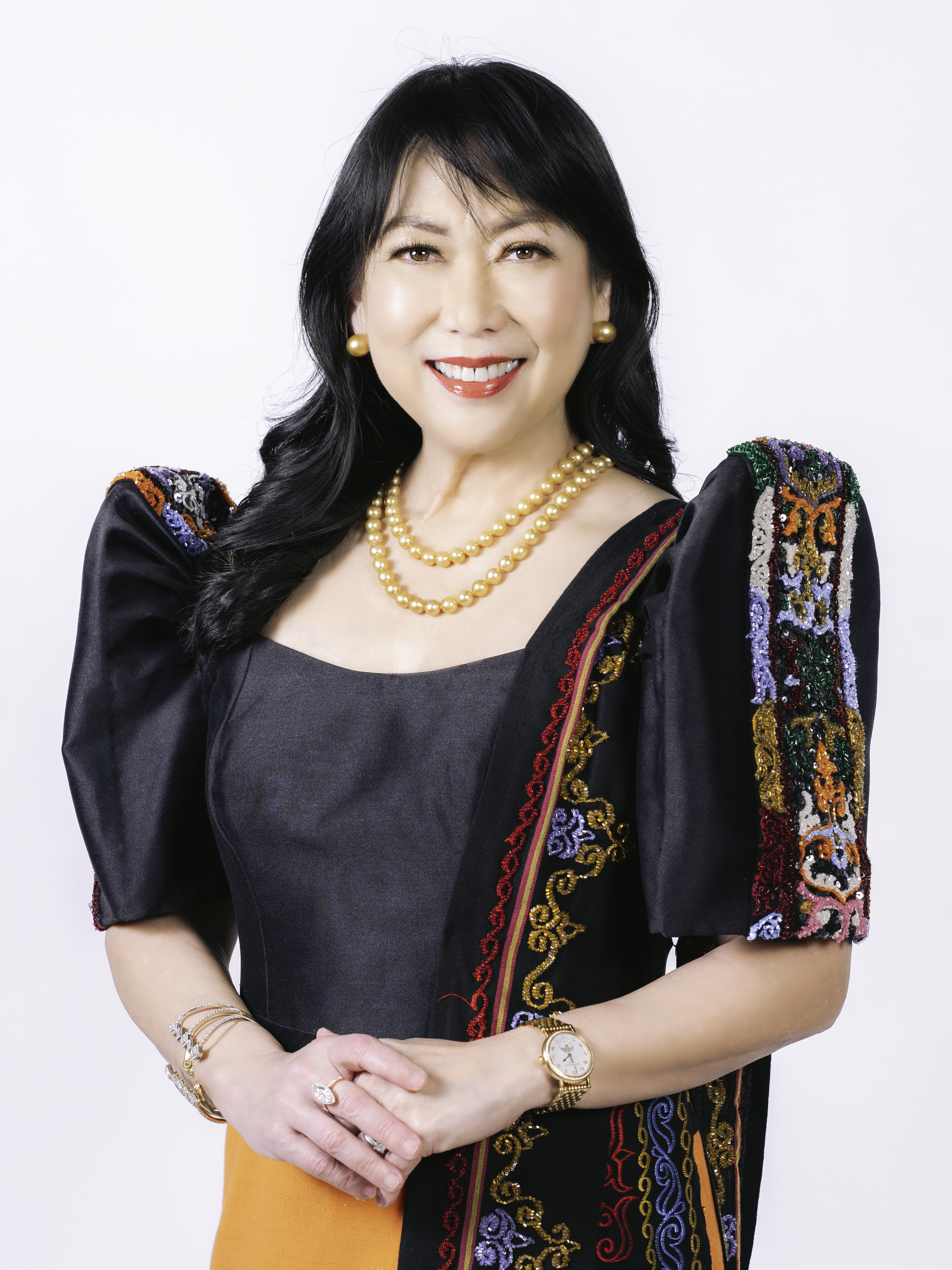
- Incumbent; Dulce Ann Hofer (PFP) since June 30, 2022
- Style: (Madam) Governor, Honorable Governor
- Residence: Zamboanga Sibugay Government Center, Ipil, Zamboanga Sibugay
- Term length: 3 years, not eligible for re-election immediately after three consecutive terms
- Inaugural holder: George Hofer
- Formation: February 22, 2001
- Succession: Vice Governor then highest ranking elected Provincial Board Member
- Website: Official Website of the Province of Zamboanga Sibugay

The governor of Zamboanga Sibugay is the local chief executive of the Philippine province of Zamboanga Sibugay. The governor holds office at the Zamboanga Sibugay Provincial Capitol. Like all local government heads in the Philippines, the governor is elected via popular vote, and may not be elected for a fourth consecutive term (although the former governor may return to office after an interval of one term). In case of death, resignation or incapacity, the vice governor becomes the governor.

== History ==
Prior to the creation of this office, Zamboanga Sibugay used to be the 3rd Legislative District of Zamboanga del Sur. On February 22, 2001, a plebiscite was held for the said area, and a new province was created. George Hofer, the author of Republic Act No. 8973 and Zamboanga del Sur's 3rd District Representative at the time, served as the province's first governor.

== List of governors ==
| # | Image | Governor | Term of office | | Party | Electoral history | Vice Governor | Vice Governor's party | Era |
| # | Image | Governor | Start | End | Party | Electoral history | Vice Governor | Vice Governor's party | Era |
|---|---|---|---|---|---|---|---|---|---|
Province created February 22, 2001.
| 1 | | George T. Hofer (1938–2019) | February 22, 2001 | June 30, 2010 | KAMPI | Elected in 2001. | Eugenio Famor | LAMMP | Fifth Republic |
| 1 | | George T. Hofer (1938–2019) | February 22, 2001 | June 30, 2010 | LDP | Re-elected in 2004. | Eric Cabarios | Lakas-CMD | Fifth Republic |
| 1 | | George T. Hofer (1938–2019) | February 22, 2001 | June 30, 2010 | LDP | Re-elected in 2007. | Rey Olegario | Lakas-CMD | Fifth Republic |
| 2 | | Rommel Jalosjos (born 1980) | June 30, 2010 | June 30, 2013 | Nacionalista | Elected in 2010. | Rey Olegario | Nacionalista | Fifth Republic |
| 3 | | Wilter Palma (born 1958) | June 30, 2013 | June 30, 2022 | Liberal | Elected in 2013. | Rey Olegario | Nacionalista | Fifth Republic |
| 3 | | Wilter Palma (born 1958) | June 30, 2013 | June 30, 2022 | Liberal | Re-elected in 2016. | Eldwin Alibutdan | Liberal | Fifth Republic |
| 3 | | Wilter Palma (born 1958) | June 30, 2013 | June 30, 2022 | PDP-Laban | Re-elected in 2019. | Rey Andre Olegario | Nacionalista | Fifth Republic |
| 4 | | Dulce Ann Hofer (born 1967) | June 30, 2022 | Incumbent; Term expires June 30, 2028 | PDP-Laban | Elected in 2022. | Rey Andre Olegario | Nacionalista | Fifth Republic |
| 4 | | Dulce Ann Hofer (born 1967) | June 30, 2022 | Incumbent; Term expires June 30, 2028 | PFP | Re-elected in 2025. | Ric-Ric Olegario | Nacionalista | Fifth Republic |

== Elections ==
=== 2025 ===
| Candidate | Party | Votes | % |
|---|---|---|---|
| Dulce Ann Hofer (Incumbent) | Partido Federal ng Pilipinas | 211,433 | 61.96 |
| Yvonne Palma | Lakas | 129,783 | 38.04 |
| Total | | 341,216 | 100.00 |
| Registered voters/turnout | | 428,422 | – |
| Partido Federal ng Pilipinas hold | | | |

=== 2022 ===
| Candidate | Party | Votes | % |
|---|---|---|---|
| Dulce Ann Hofer | PDP-Laban | 168,373 | 53.80 |
| Wilter "Sharky" Palma II | Lakas | 143,539 | 45.86 |
| Jose Policarpio Jr. | Independent | 763 | 0.24 |
| Peping Tu | Independent | 309 | 0.10 |
| Total | | 312,984 | 100.00 |
| Registered voters/turnout | | 339,351 | – |
| PDP-Laban gain from Lakas | | | |

=== 2019 ===
| Candidate | Party | Votes | % |
|---|---|---|---|
| Wilter Palma (Incumbent) | PDP-Laban | 139,130 | 51.86 |
| George "Jet" Hofer II | Independent | 127,226 | 47.42 |
| Matthew Alison Apostol | Independent | 1,531 | 0.57 |
| Elvira Rempis | Independent | 408 | 0.15 |
| Total | | 268,295 | 100.00 |
| PDP-Laban hold | | | |

=== 2016 ===
| Candidate | Party | Votes | % |
|---|---|---|---|
| Wilter Palma (Incumbent) | Liberal | 138,751 | 58.73 |
| Romeo Jalosjos Jr | Nacionalista | 95,099 | 40.25 |
| Joel Brito | Independent | 906 | 0.38 |
| Gerryboy Benedicto | Independent | 896 | 0.38 |
| Jaime Natividad | NUP | 614 | 0.26 |
| Total | | 236,266 | 100.00 |
| Liberal hold | | | |

=== 2013 ===
| Candidate | Party | Votes | % |
|---|---|---|---|
| Wilter Palma | Liberal | 118,575 | 51.07 |
| Rommel Jalosjos (incumbent) | Nacionalista | 113,616 | 48.93 |
| Total | | 232,191 | 100.00 |
| Liberal gain from Nacionalista | | | |

=== 2010 ===
| Candidate | Party | Votes | % |
|---|---|---|---|
| Rommel Jalosjos | Nacionalista | 121,441 | 52.92 |
| Dulce Ann Hofer | Lakas-Kampi | 107,276 | 46.75 |
| Lodrito Sabaiton | Independent | 763 | 0.33 |
| Total | | 229,480 | 100.00 |
| Nacionalista gain from Lakas-Kampi | | | |

=== 2007 ===
| Candidate | Party | Votes | % |
|---|---|---|---|
| George Hofer (Incumbent) | Laban ng Demokratikong Pilipino | 95,945 | 55.79 |
| Eric Cabarios | Lakas–CMD | 76,034 | 44.21 |
| Total | | 171,979 | 100.00 |
| Laban ng Demokratikong Pilipino hold | | | |

=== 2004 ===
| Candidate | Party | Votes | % |
|---|---|---|---|
| George Hofer (incumbent) | Laban ng Demokratikong Pilipino | 68,106 | 41.55 |
| Eugenio Famor | Lakas–CMD | 54,503 | 33.25 |
| Alfredo Chu | Pwersa ng Masang Pilipino | 40,985 | 25.00 |
| Lodrito Sabaiton | Independent | 337 | 0.21 |
| Total | | 163,931 | 100.00 |
| Laban ng Demokratikong Pilipino hold | | | |

=== 2001 ===
| Candidate | Party | Votes | % |
|---|---|---|---|
| George Hofer (incumbent) | Kabalikat ng Malayang Pilipino | 71,469 | 53.01 |
| Alfredo Chu | Lakas–NUCD–UMDP | 63,345 | 46.99 |
| Total | | 134,814 | 100.00 |
| Kabalikat ng Malayang Pilipino hold | | | |
