= Remberto Sotto =

Filipino politician (born 1949)

Municipal Mayor of Alicia, Zamboanga Sibugay
- In office July 2020 – June 30, 2022
- Vice Mayor: Rhine Tan
- Preceded by: Yashier S. Musa
- Succeeded by: Alvie Musa

Vice Mayor of Alicia, Zamboanga Sibugay
- In office June 30, 2013 – July 2020
- Succeeded by: Rhine Tan

Personal details
- Born: Remberto Gonzalo Sotto; February 4, 1949 (age 77) Margosatubig, Zamboanga, Philippines
- Party: UNA (2024–present)
- Other political affiliations: Lakas-CMD (2021–2024); PDP-Laban (2018–2021); Liberal (until 2018)
- Education: Southwestern University
- Profession: Dentist
- Nickname: Bert

Remberto Gonzalo Sotto (born February 4, 1949) is a Filipino politician who was mayor of Alicia, Zamboanga Sibugay from 2020 to 2022 and vice mayor of the same municipality from 2013 to 2020.

== Political career ==
Sotto served as the Vice Mayor of Alicia from 2013 to 2020, winning the 2013 elections, 2016 elections, and 2019 elections, and served as the Mayor of Alicia from 2020 until he was defeated by Alvie Musa during the 2022 elections. Sotto ran for Sangguniang Bayan of Alicia during the 2025 elections but lost and ended in 9th place.

== Electoral performance ==
=== 2025 ===
2025 Alicia Sangguniang Bayan Election
Candidate	Party	Votes	%
Laarnie Laja (incumbent)	PFP	13,162	10.10
April Jahara Gubat (incumbent)	PFP	12,589	9.66
Dante Buhayan	PFP	11,978	9.19
Rhine Tan	PFP	11,840	9.09
Charito De Asis	PFP	11,387	8.74
Said Ahiron (incumbent)	PFP	11,055	8.49
Luther Parojinog (incumbent)	PFP	8,667	6.65
Jape Encarnacion (incumbent)	PFP	7,978	6.12
Remberto Sotto	UNA	6,893	5.29
Yasen Akinuddin	Independent	4,780	3.67
Doctor Ocampos	Independent	4,742	3.64
Jo Ann Babaran	UNA	3,893	2.99
Nene Abilla	UNA	3,808	2.92
Balmes Ocampos Jr.	UNA	3,432	2.63
Rogelio Roa Jr.	UNA	3,291	2.53
Imang Musa	UNA	3,111	2.39
Melchor Caga-anan	UNA	2,482	1.91
Jaime Babaran	Independent	1,695	1.30
Al-Yaseen Magsucang	Independent	1,108	0.85
Juripin Amilussin	Independent	664	0.51
Teodoro Castillo Jr.	Independent	612	0.47
Nestor Bonbon	Independent	579	0.44
Arlene Remegio	Independent	527	0.40
Total		130,273	100.00
Registered voters/turnout		25,212	–

=== 2022 ===
2022 Alicia Mayoral Election
Candidate	Party	Votes	%
Alvie Musa	PPP	11,765	58.65
Remberto Sotto (Incumbent)	Lakas-CMD	8,294	41.35
Total		20,059	100.00
Registered voters/turnout		21,083	–
PPP gain from Lakas-CMD			

=== 2019 ===
2019 Alicia Vice Mayoral Election
Candidate	Party	Votes	%
Remberto Sotto (incumbent)	PDP-Laban	13,247	100.00
Total		13,247	100.00
PDP-Laban hold			

=== 2016 ===
2016 Alicia Vice Mayoral Election
Candidate	Party	Votes	%
Remberto Sotto (incumbent)	Liberal	12,302	76.29
Richard Tiu Sr.	Nacionalista	3,823	23.71
Total		16,125	100.00
Liberal hold			
