= Belma Cabilao =

Filipino lawyer and politician (born 1942)

Belma Cabilao GCrGH
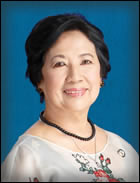
- Official portrait, 2013

Member of the Philippine House of Representatives
- In office June 30, 2013 – June 30, 2016
- Preceded by: Jonathan Yambao
- Succeeded by: Wilter Palma II
- In office June 30, 2007 – June 30, 2010
- Preceded by: District established
- Succeeded by: Jonathan Yambao
- Constituency: Zamboanga Sibugay's 1st district
- In office June 30, 2001 – June 30, 2007
- Preceded by: District established
- Succeeded by: District abolished
- Constituency: Zamboanga Sibugay's at-large district
- In office June 30, 1992 – June 30, 1998
- Preceded by: Wilfredo Cainglet
- Succeeded by: George T. Hofer
- Constituency: Zamboanga del Sur's 3rd district

Vice Governor of Zamboanga del Sur
- In office February 2, 1988 – June 30, 1992
- Officer-in-charge
- In office March 25, 1986 – February 2, 1988
- Governor: Javier Ariosa
- Preceded by: Samuel Arcamo
- Succeeded by: Romeo Vera Cruz

Personal details
- Born: Belma Arellano Cabilao; November 10, 1942 (age 83) Malangas, Zamboanga del Sur, Philippines
- Party: Nacionalista (2007–present)
- Other political affiliations: Lakas (1992–2007); CCA (1984)
- Education: University of Santo Tomas (LLB, MA)
- Profession: Lawyer

Belma Arellano Cabilao GCrGH (born November 10, 1942) is a Filipino lawyer and politician who served as a member of the Philippine House of Representatives for Zamboanga Sibugay's 1st congressional district from 2007 to 2010 and 2013 to 2016. Currently a member of the Nacionalista Party, she previously represented Zamboanga Sibugay's at-large district in the House from 2001 to 2007, and Zamboanga del Sur's 3rd district from 1992 to 1998, and served as vice governor of Zamboanga del Sur from 1986 to 1992.

== Early life and education ==
Cabilao was born on November 10, 1942, in Malangas, Zamboanga del Sur, to Mariano Cabilao and Leonor Arellano. She attended Malangas Central Elementary School and Malangas Institute for her primary and secondary education, respectively. In 1962, she graduated with a degree in anthropology from Silliman University.

Cabilao later went to the University of Santo Tomas, where she earned a Bachelor of Laws degree in 1966 and a Master of Arts in Social Sciences in 1969.

== Career ==
Cabilao's official portrait in the 12th Congress

Before entering politics, Cabilao worked as a legal officer with the Land Registration Commission, administrator of the Malangas Institute, project director and board member of Malangas Credit Union Incorporated, and legal counsel of the Prelature of Ipil. She was also a member of the Free Legal Assistance Group from 1977 to 1992.

In 1984, Cabilao ran for the Regular Batasang Pambansa under the Concerned Citizens' Aggrupation, representing Zamboanga del Sur, but lost. She was later appointed by President Corazon Aquino as the officer-in-charge (OIC) vice governor of Zamboanga del Sur, alongside Javier Ariosa as OIC governor. They were elected to a full term in 1988.

Cabilao then ran for Zamboanga del Sur's 3rd district in the House of Representatives in 1992 under Lakas–CMD, defeating incumbent representative Wilfredo Cainglet. She was reelected in 1995, but lost her reelection bid for a third term in 1998 to George T. Hofer.

On June 23, 1998, Cabilao was awarded the Grand Cross of the Order of the Golden Heart by President Fidel V. Ramos.

When a congressional district for the new province of Zamboanga Sibugay was created, Cabilao successfully ran for a new term in 2001 and was reelected in 2004. The district was later divided into two in 2006, and she ran for Zamboanga Sibugay's 1st district in 2007. She was term-limited in 2010, and her son Jonathan Yambao ran for and won the seat.

Cabilao won a new term in 2013, running under the Nacionalista Party, and served until 2016. She lost reelection in 2016 to Wilter Palma II and has since retired from public office.

== Electoral history ==
Electoral history of Belma Cabilao
Year	Office	Party	Votes received				Result
Year	Office	Party	Total	%	P.	Swing	Result
1984	Assemblywoman (Zamboanga del Sur)	CCA	—N/a	—N/a	8th	—N/a	Lost
1988	Vice Governor of Zamboanga del Sur	Unknown	—N/a	—N/a	1st	—N/a	Won
1992	Representative (Zamboanga del Sur–3rd)	Lakas	37,759	41.08%	1st	—N/a	Won
1995	Representative (Zamboanga del Sur–3rd)	Lakas	51,019	50.97%	1st	—N/a	Won
1998	Representative (Zamboanga del Sur–3rd)	Lakas	60,575	45.94%	2nd	—N/a	Lost
2001	Representative (Zamboanga Sibugay)	Lakas	—N/a	—N/a	1st	—N/a	Won
2004	Representative (Zamboanga Sibugay)	Lakas	—N/a	—N/a	1st	—N/a	Won
2007	Representative (Zamboanga Sibugay–1st)	Lakas	—N/a	—N/a	1st	—N/a	Won
2013	Representative (Zamboanga Sibugay–1st)	Nacionalista	—N/a	—N/a	1st	—N/a	Won
2016	Representative (Zamboanga Sibugay–1st)	Nacionalista	42,417	45.23%	2nd	—N/a	Lost

== Honors ==
=== National honors ===
- Grand Cross (Maringal na Krus) of the Order of the Golden Heart

House of Representatives of the Philippines
Preceded by Jonathan Yambao	Member of the Philippine House of Representatives for Zamboanga Sibugay's 1st district 2013–2016	Succeeded by Wilter Palma II
New district	Member of the Philippine House of Representatives for Zamboanga Sibugay's 1st district 2007–2010	Succeeded by Jonathan Yambao
New district	Member of the Philippine House of Representatives for Zamboanga Sibugay's at-large district 2001–2007	District abolished
Preceded by Wilfredo Cainglet	Member of the Philippine House of Representatives for Zamboanga del Sur's 3rd district 1992–1998	Succeeded by George T. Hofer
Political offices
Preceded by Samuel Arcamo	Vice Governor of Zamboanga del Sur; 1986–1992 (OIC: 1986–1988)	Succeeded by Romeo Vera Cruz
