= Dulce Ann Hofer =

Filipina educator and politician

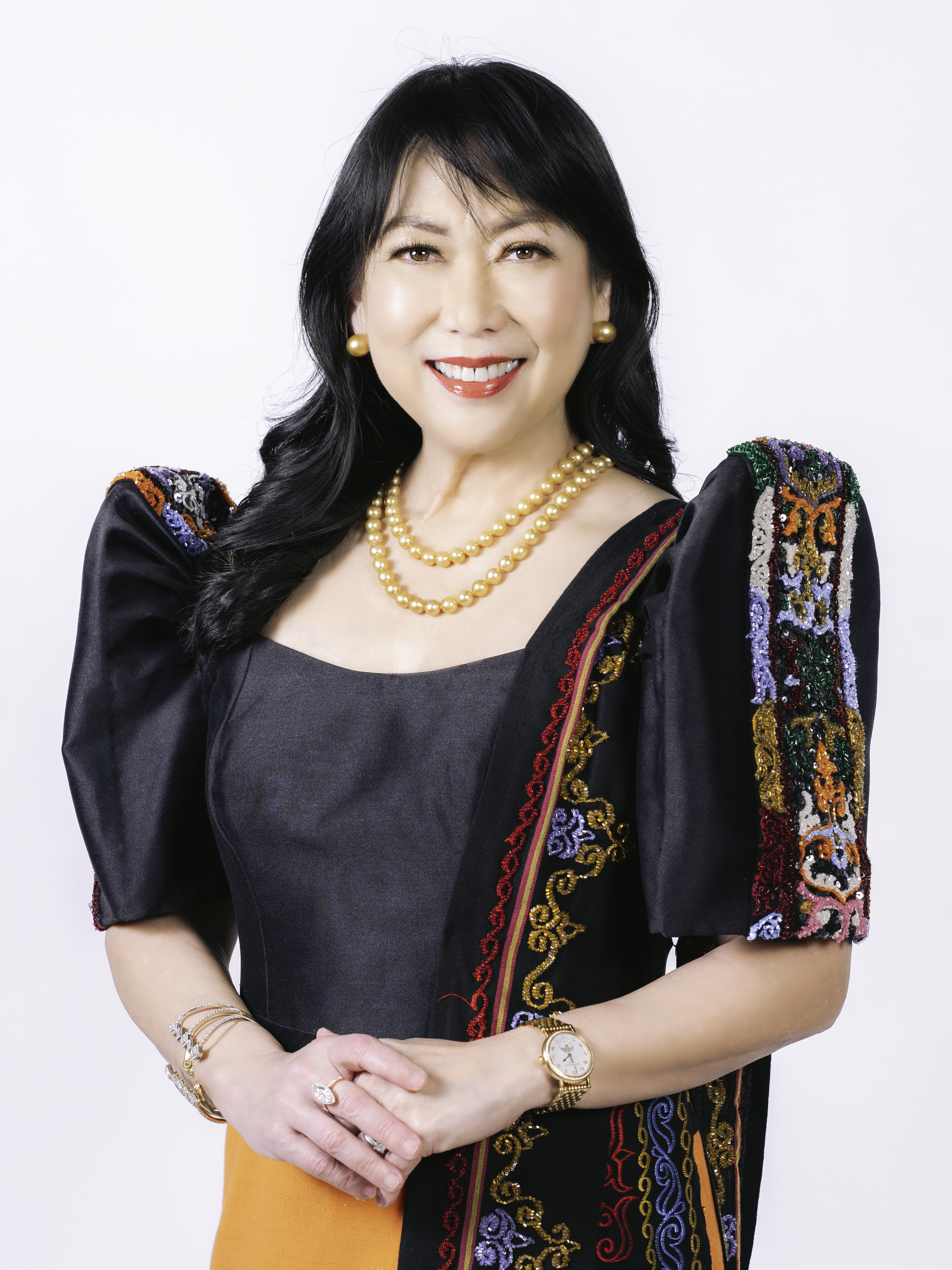
- Official portrait, 2023

4th Governor of Zamboanga Sibugay
- Incumbent
- Assumed office June 30, 2022
- Vice Governor: Rey Andre Olegario (2022–2025); Ric-Ric Olegario (2025–present)
- Preceded by: Wilter Palma Sr.

Chair of the House Foreign Affairs Committee
- In office July 22, 2019 – June 30, 2022
- Succeeded by: Maria Rachel Arenas

Member of the Philippine House of Representatives from Zamboanga Sibugay's 2nd district
- In office June 30, 2013 – June 30, 2022
- Preceded by: Romeo Jalosjos Jr.
- Succeeded by: Antonieta Eudela
- In office June 30, 2007 – June 30, 2010
- Preceded by: Constituency created
- Succeeded by: Romeo Jalosjos Jr.

Personal details
- Born: Dulce Ann Kintanar Hofer; June 3, 1967 (age 59) Cebu City, Philippines
- Party: PFP (since 2023)
- Other political affiliations: PDP–Laban (2016–2023); Liberal (2011–2016); Lakas (2003–2011)
- Spouse: Roderick R. Santos
- Relations: Marly Hofer-Hasim (cousin)
- Parents: George Hofer (father); Dulce Kintanar (mother)
- Education: Ateneo de Manila University (BBA); University of the Philippines Cebu (MBA); University of the Philippines Diliman (D.P.A)
- Occupation: Educator and Politician
- Profession: Businessperson
- Nicknames: Ann Hofer; Ann K. Hofer; Doc. Ann

Military service
- Allegiance: Philippines
- Branch/service: Philippine Air Force
- Years of service: 2020-Present
- Rank: Lieutenant colonel (reserve)

Dulce Ann Kintanar Hofer-Santos (born June 3, 1967) is a Filipina educator and politician from the province of Zamboanga Sibugay. She is currently the Governor of Zamboanga Sibugay since 2022.

== Early life and education ==
Hofer was born on June 3, 1967 in Cebu City. She is the daughter of the founding father and 1st Governor of Zamboanga Sibugay, George Hofer and Dr. Dulce Kintanar. Hofer has a number of higher education diplomas, including:

- Bachelor of Business Administration from Ateneo de Manila University
- Master of Business Administration (MBA) from the University of the Philippines Cebu
- Doctor of Public Administration from the UP National College of Public Administration and Governance, University of the Philippines Diliman.

She has had further executive education at the Harvard Kennedy School at Harvard University, the University of Chicago Booth School of Business, and the Asian Institute of Management.

== House of Representatives (2007-2010, 2013-2022) ==
Hofer ran and won as representative of the then-newly created 2nd legislative district of Zamboanga Sibugay in the 2007 local elections.

=== 2010 Gubernatorial attempt ===
She ran for governor of Zamboanga Sibugay in 2010 to replace her father, incumbent (at the time) governor George Hofer, but was defeated by Rommel Jalosjos.

==== 2013, 2016, and 2019 elections ====
She ran for congresswoman in 2013 against incumbent congressman Romeo Jalosjos Jr., and was successful. She would proceed to win in the 2016 and 2019 local elections. In the 17th Congress, Hofer served as the Chairperson of the Philippine House Committee on Higher and Technical Education.

==== 18th Congress ====
In the 18th Congress, she was the Chairperson of the Philippine House Committee on Foreign Affairs, and was as member of the House Committee on Appropriations. On July 10, 2020, Hofer is among the 70 representatives who voted to reject the franchise renewal of ABS-CBN.

== Governor of Zamboanga Sibugay (since 2022) ==
=== 2022 elections ===
In the 2022 local elections, she was term limited, opted to run again for governor of Zamboanga Sibugay, and defeated the incumbent 1st District of Zamboanga Sibugay Wilter "Sharky" Palma II.

=== 2025 elections ===
In the 2025 local elections, she again ran for re-election for Governor of Zamboanga Sibugay and defeated Incumbent 1st District Board Member, Yvonne Palma.

== Personal life ==
She is married to Roderick R. Santos, her cousin is incumbent representative, doctor Marly Hofer–Hasim of Zamboanga Sibugay's 2nd congressional district and her nephews are incumbent Sangguniang Panlalawigan members Pava Hofer and Ralph Hofer delos Santos, both were elected in 2025.

== Military career ==
In 2020, alongside Budget Secretary Wendel Avisado, Hofer was appointed lieutenant colonel in the Philippine Air Force reserve by Defense Secretary Delfin Lorenzana.

== Electoral history ==
Electoral history of Dulce Ann Hofer
Year	Office	Party	Votes Hofer received				Result
Year	Office	Party	Total	%	P.	Swing	Result
2007	Representative (Zamboanga Sibugay-2nd)	Lakas	—N/a	—N/a	1st	—N/a	Won
2013	Representative (Zamboanga Sibugay-2nd)	Liberal	57,511	58.8%	1st	—N/a	Won
2016	Representative (Zamboanga Sibugay-2nd)	Liberal	119,115	94.42%	1st	+35.62	Won
2019	Representative (Zamboanga Sibugay-2nd)	PDP–Laban	96,788	62.30%	1st	-32.12	Won
2010	Governor of Zamboanga Sibugay	Lakas	121,441	52.92%	2nd	—N/a	Lost
2022	Governor of Zamboanga Sibugay	PDP–Laban	168,373	53.80%	1st	+0.88	Won
2025	Governor of Zamboanga Sibugay	PFP	211,433	61.96%	1st	+8.16	Won

Political offices
Preceded by Wilter Y. Palma	Governor of Zamboanga Sibugay; 2022–present	Incumbent
House of Representatives of the Philippines
Preceded by Romeo M. Jalosjos, Jr.	Representative, 2nd District of Zamboanga Sibugay; 2013–2022	Succeeded by Antonieta R. Eudela
Preceded by Position created	Representative, 2nd District of Zamboanga Sibugay; 2007–2010	Succeeded by Romeo M. Jalosjos, Jr.
