= Siay =

Municipality in Zamboanga Sibugay, Philippines

- Municipality
- Municipality of Siay
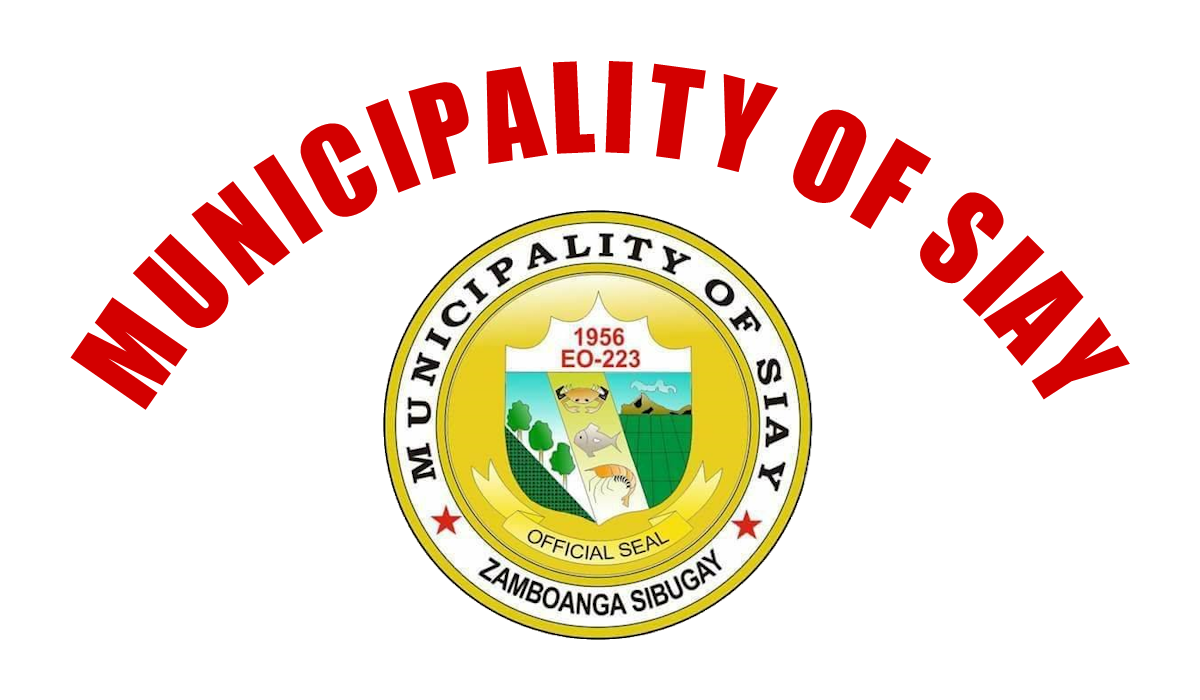
- Flag Seal

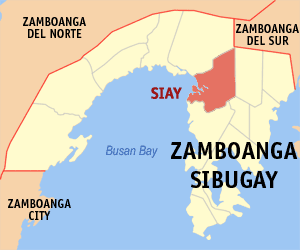
- Map of Zamboanga Sibugay with Siay highlighted
- Interactive map of Siay
- Location within the Philippines
- Coordinates: 7°42′20″N 122°51′51″E
- Country: Philippines
- Region: Zamboanga Peninsula
- Province: Zamboanga Sibugay
- District: 2nd district
- Founded: December 28, 1956
- Barangays: 29 (see Barangays)

Government
  - Type: Sangguniang Bayan
  - Mayor: Jarvis M. Acosta
  - Vice Mayor: Julius M. Acosta Jr.
  - Representative: Dr. Marly T. Hofer-Hasim
  - Municipal Council: Members: Emma E. Bagaforo; Cerses P. Ebol; Rogie S. Enriquez; Jimmy S. Cañete; Ritche C. Paster; Juan G. Tumampos; Romeo P. Tenerife; Joelly D. Sasota
  - Electorate: 25,960 voters (2025)

Area
  - Total: 313.66 km^{2} (121.10 sq mi)
- Elevation: 34 m (112 ft)
- Highest elevation: 222 m (728 ft)
- Lowest elevation: −3 m (−9.8 ft)

Population (2024 census)
  - Total: 43,233
  - Density: 137.83/km^{2} (356.99/sq mi)
  - Households: 10,096

Economy
  - Income class: 1st municipal income class
  - Poverty incidence: 18.88% (2023)
  - Revenue: ₱ 252.8 million (2024)
  - Assets: ₱ 484.4 million (2024)
  - Expenditure: ₱ 101.6 million (2024)
  - Liabilities: ₱ 117.3 million (2024)

Service provider
  - Electricity: Zamboanga del Sur 2 Electric Cooperative (ZAMSURECO 2)
- Time zone: UTC+8 (PST)
- ZIP code: 7006
- PSGC: 0908313000
- IDD : area code: +63 (0)62
- Native languages: Subanon; Cebuano; Chavacano; Tagalog
- Website: www.siaysibugay.gov.ph

Siay, officially the Municipality of Siay (Cebuano: Lungsod sa Siay; Chavacano: Municipalidad de Siay; Tagalog: Bayan ng Siay), is a municipality in the province of Zamboanga Sibugay, Philippines. According to the 2024 census, it has a population of 43,233 people.

The municipality is located in the 2nd District and the eastern part of the province of Zamboanga Sibugay. It is 38 kilometers from Ipil, 220 kilometers to Dipolog, and 180 kilometers east to Zamboanga City. It is geographically situated within a map coordination of 741 east & 122* 53*west.

Siay is bounded from the north by the municipality of Diplahan, south by the Sibuguey Bay, west by the municipality of Kabasalan, and east by the municipality of Imelda.

== History ==
The municipality was created through Executive Order No. 223, signed by President Ramon Magsaysay on December 28, 1956, consisting twenty-six barrios and sitios of Kabasalan, including Barrio Siay which was designated as the seat of government, and another six in Malangas, all then located in Zamboanga del Sur.

Siay had its territory reduced in November 1977 with the detachment of twenty-two barangays; thirteen were organized into the new municipality of Payao, while another nine, along with parts of Malangas and Alicia, were constituted into Imelda.

== Geography ==
=== Barangays ===
Siay is politically subdivided into 29 barangays. Each barangay consists of puroks while some have sitios.

- Bagongsilang
- Balagon
- Balingasan
- Balucanan
- Bataan (Dacanay)
- Batu
- Buyogan
- Camanga
- Coloran
- Kimos (Kima)
- Labasan
- Lagting
- Laih
- Logpond
- Magsaysay
- Mahayahay
- Maligaya
- Maniha
- Minsulao
- Mirangan
- Monching
- Paruk
- Poblacion
- Princesa Sumama
- Salinding
- San Isidro
- Sibuguey
- Siloh
- Villagracia

=== Climate ===
Climate data for Siay, Zamboanga Sibugay
Month	Jan	Feb	Mar	Apr	May	Jun	Jul	Aug	Sep	Oct	Nov	Dec	Year
Mean daily maximum °C (°F)	31 (88)	31 (88)	32 (90)	31 (88)	30 (86)	29 (84)	29 (84)	29 (84)	29 (84)	29 (84)	30 (86)	30 (86)	30 (86)
Mean daily minimum °C (°F)	23 (73)	23 (73)	24 (75)	25 (77)	25 (77)	25 (77)	24 (75)	24 (75)	24 (75)	24 (75)	24 (75)	23 (73)	24 (75)
Average precipitation mm (inches)	61 (2.4)	55 (2.2)	75 (3.0)	81 (3.2)	145 (5.7)	189 (7.4)	189 (7.4)	197 (7.8)	162 (6.4)	181 (7.1)	115 (4.5)	70 (2.8)	1,520 (59.9)
Average rainy days	16.4	15.7	19.1	21.5	26.9	27.1	26.4	25.0	24.2	26.8	23.5	18.7	271.3
Source: Meteoblue

== Demographics ==
Population census of Siay
Year	Pop.	±% p.a.
1960	14,088	—
1970	32,922	+8.85%
1975	37,816	+2.82%
1980	17,004	−14.77%
1990	24,689	+3.80%
1995	29,303	+3.26%
2000	32,844	+2.48%
2007	33,902	+0.44%
2010	38,229	+4.47%
2015	41,572	+1.61%
2020	40,585	−0.50%
2024	43,233	+1.53%
Source: Philippine Statistics Authority

== Economy ==
Poverty incidence of Siay (%)

Source: Philippine Statistics Authority

== Environment ==
Siay is the location of the Kabug Mangrove Park and Wetlands.
