= Wilter Palma =

Filipino politician (born 1958)

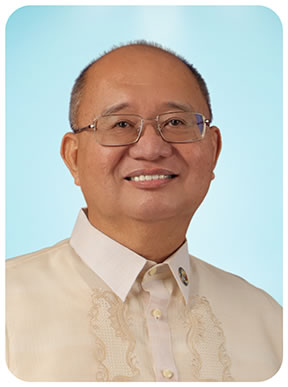
- Official portrait, 2022

Member of the Philippine House of Representatives from Zamboanga Sibugay's 1st district
- In office June 30, 2022 – June 30, 2025
- Preceded by: Wilter Palma II
- Succeeded by: Marlo Bancoro

3rd Governor of Zamboanga Sibugay
- In office June 30, 2013 – June 30, 2022
- Vice Governor: Rey Olegario (2013–2016); Eldwin Alibutdan (2016–2019); Rey Andre Olegario (2019–2022)
- Preceded by: Rommel Jalosjos
- Succeeded by: Dulce Ann Hofer

Mayor of Diplahan
- In office June 30, 2004 – June 30, 2013

Personal details
- Born: March 21, 1958 (age 68) Zamboanga City, Zamboanga del Sur, Philippines
- Party: Lakas (until 2009; 2021–present)
- Other political affiliations: PDP–Laban (2016–2021); Liberal (2012–2016); Nacionalista (2009–2012)
- Spouse: Aida Wee Palma

Wilter Yap Palma (born March 21, 1958) is a Filipino lawyer and politician from the province of Zamboanga Sibugay in the Philippines. He served as a Representative for the Zamboanga Sibugay's 1st congressional district from 2022 to 2025 and the 3rd Governor of Zamboanga Sibugay from 2013 to 2022.

== Political career ==
Prior to the governorship, Palma served as the municipal mayor of Diplahan, Zamboanga Sibugay from 2004 to 2013.

He was first elected as Governor of the province in 2013 and was re-elected in 2016 and 2019.

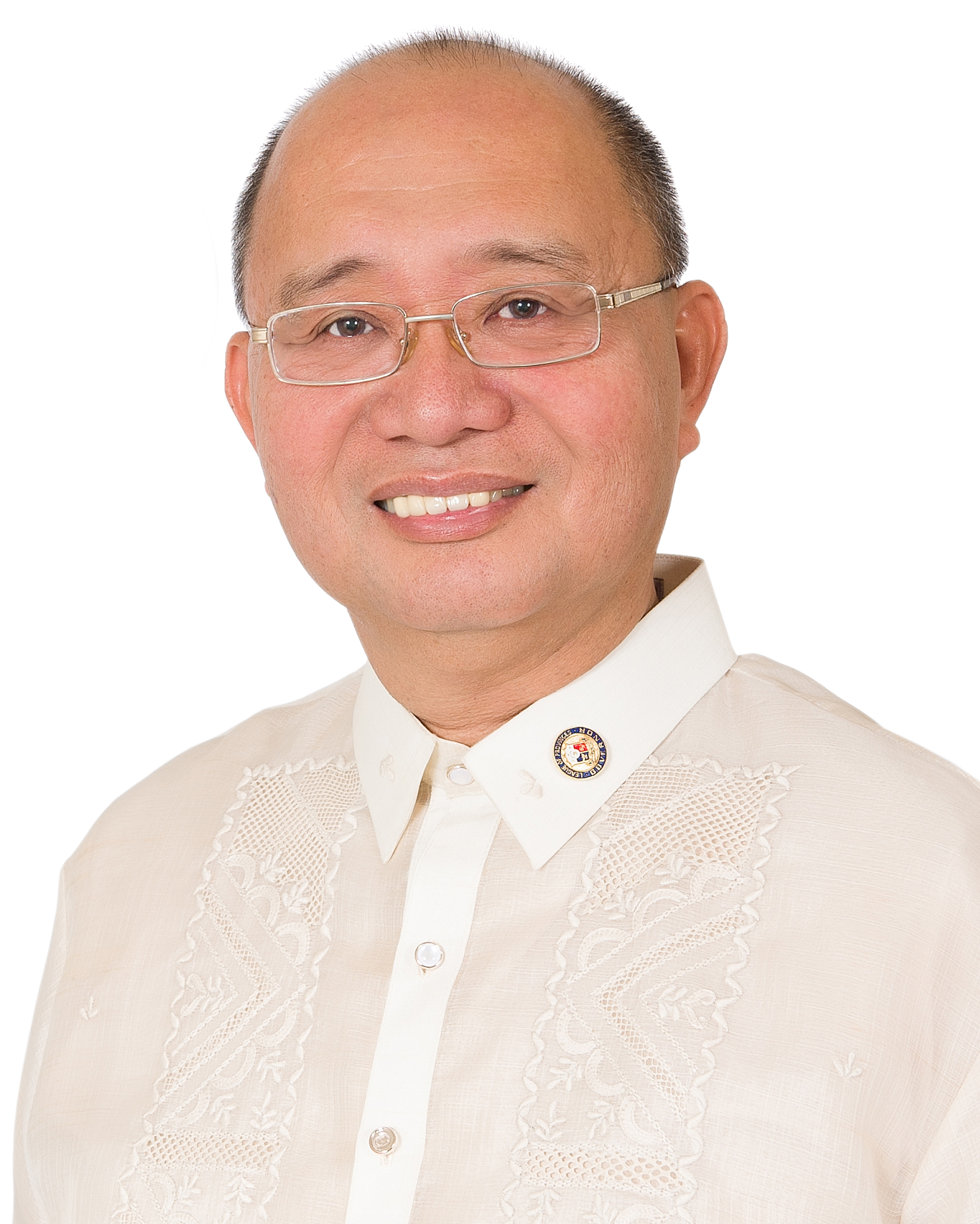
Palma's official portrait as Governor, 2014

Being term-limited, Palma for ran and won to take the open seat in the Philippine House of Representatives for the 1st legislative district of the province replacing his namesake son, Wilter II, who ran but was defeated to take his place in the 2022 local elections in Zamboanga Sibugay.

Palma ran for re-election in the 2025 Midterm Elections but was defeated by incumbent provincial board member, PFP member Marlo Bancoro.

== Personal life ==
He is the father of former 1st district representative Wilter "Sharky" Palma II.
