= Talusan =

Municipality in Zamboanga Sibugay, Philippines

- Municipality
- Municipality of Talusan
- Seal

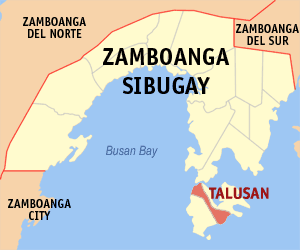
- Map of Zamboanga Sibugay with Talusan highlighted
- Interactive map of Talusan
- Location within the Philippines
- Coordinates: 7°25′35″N 122°48′30″E
- Country: Philippines
- Region: Zamboanga Peninsula
- Province: Zamboanga Sibugay
- District: 1st district
- Founded: November 11, 1977
- Barangays: 14 (see Barangays)

Government
  - Type: Sangguniang Bayan
  - Mayor: Gilbert Edem
  - Vice Mayor: Orlando Ramiso
  - Representative: Wilter W. Palma II
  - Municipal Council: Members: Leonie G. Lim; Gilbert T. Edem; Paisal U. Camlian; Monel J. Igni; Angelita T. Lacpao; Billy B. Sihilan; Virgilio B. Aringoy; Annura D. Lipae
  - Electorate: 11,140 voters (2025)

Area
  - Total: 58.16 km^{2} (22.46 sq mi)
- Elevation: 7.0 m (23.0 ft)
- Highest elevation: 45 m (148 ft)
- Lowest elevation: −3 m (−9.8 ft)

Population (2024 census)
  - Total: 17,925
  - Density: 308.2/km^{2} (798.2/sq mi)
  - Households: 5,495

Economy
  - Income class: 4th municipal income class
  - Poverty incidence: 33.48% (2023)
  - Revenue: ₱ 131.9 million (2024)
  - Assets: ₱ 528.4 million (2024)
  - Expenditure: ₱ 41.99 million (2024)
  - Liabilities: ₱ 47.42 million (2024)

Service provider
  - Electricity: Zamboanga del Sur 2 Electric Cooperative (ZAMSURECO 2)
- Time zone: UTC+8 (PST)
- ZIP code: 7012
- PSGC: 0908314000
- IDD : area code: +63 (0)62
- Native languages: Subanon; Cebuano; Chavacano; Tagalog
- Website: www.talusansibugay.gov.ph

Talusan, officially the Municipality of Talusan (Cebuano: Lungsod sa Talusan; Chavacano: Municipalidad de Talusan; Tagalog: Bayan ng Talusan), is a municipality in the province of Zamboanga Sibugay, Philippines. According to the 2024 census, it has a population of 17,925 people.

It is the second least populous municipality in the province and the smallest in area.

The municipality is located in the central part of Olutanga Island.

== Geography ==
=== Barangays ===
Talusan is politically subdivided into 14 barangays. Each barangay consists of puroks while some have sitios.

- Aurora
- Baganipay
- Bolingan
- Bualan
- Cawilan
- Florida
- Kasigpitan
- Laparay
- Mahayahay
- Moalboal
- Poblacion (Talusan)
- Sagay
- Samonte
- Tuburan

=== Climate ===
Climate data for Talusan, Zamboanga Sibugay
Month	Jan	Feb	Mar	Apr	May	Jun	Jul	Aug	Sep	Oct	Nov	Dec	Year
Mean daily maximum °C (°F)	31 (88)	31 (88)	31 (88)	31 (88)	30 (86)	29 (84)	29 (84)	29 (84)	29 (84)	29 (84)	30 (86)	30 (86)	30 (86)
Mean daily minimum °C (°F)	23 (73)	23 (73)	23 (73)	24 (75)	25 (77)	25 (77)	24 (75)	24 (75)	24 (75)	24 (75)	24 (75)	23 (73)	24 (75)
Average precipitation mm (inches)	61 (2.4)	55 (2.2)	75 (3.0)	81 (3.2)	145 (5.7)	189 (7.4)	189 (7.4)	197 (7.8)	162 (6.4)	181 (7.1)	115 (4.5)	70 (2.8)	1,520 (59.9)
Average rainy days	16.4	15.7	19.1	21.5	26.9	27.1	26.4	25.0	24.2	26.8	23.5	18.7	271.3
Source: Meteoblue

== Demographics ==
Population census of Talusan
Year	Pop.	±% p.a.
1980	10,477	—
1990	10,455	−0.02%
1995	15,012	+7.01%
2000	18,394	+4.45%
2007	22,875	+3.05%
2010	25,268	+3.69%
2015	29,969	+3.30%
2020	27,873	−1.51%
2024	17,925	−10.06%
Source: Philippine Statistics Authority

== Economy ==
Poverty incidence of Talusan (%)

Source: Philippine Statistics Authority

Talusan will be the area of Southeast Asia's first hydrogen power plant to power the off-grid areas of Olutanga. The power plant will be developed by the French-company Hydrogen de France Energy (HDF Energy) and will be fully-operational by 2027.
