= Payao, Zamboanga Sibugay =

Municipality in Zamboanga Sibugay, Philippines

Payao
- Municipality
- Municipality of Payao
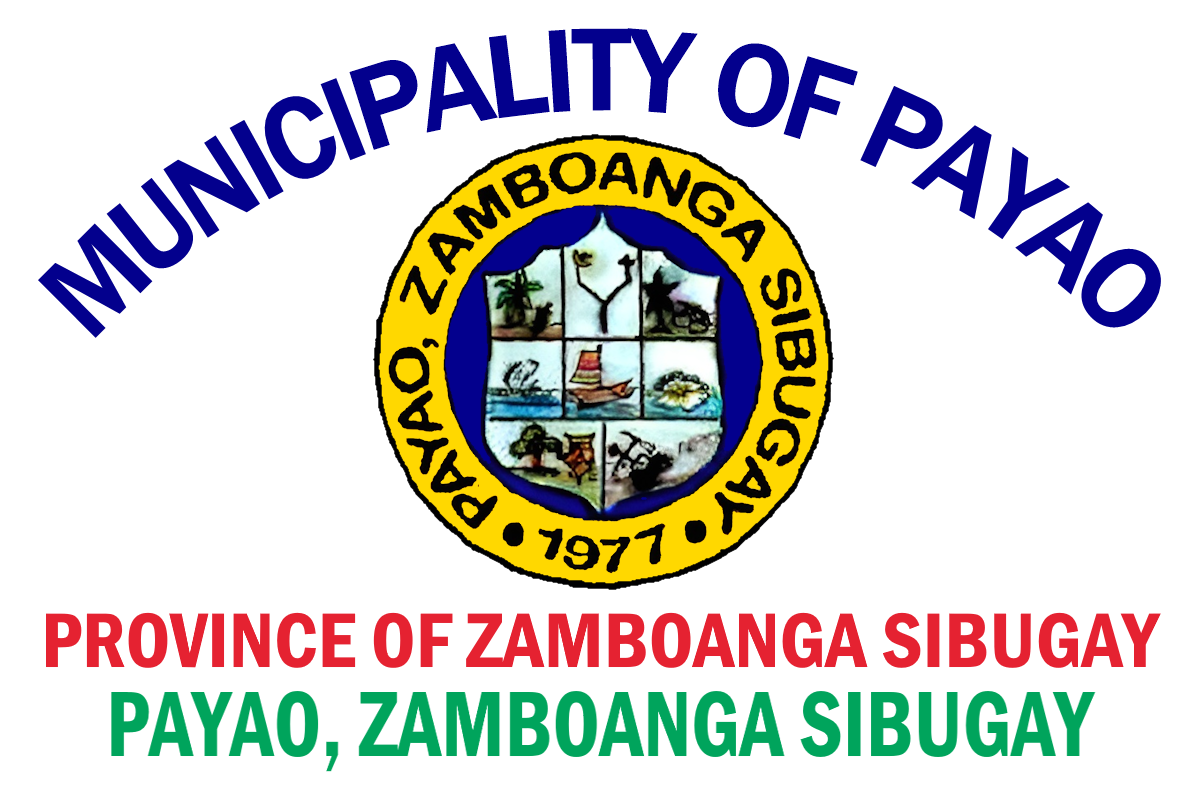
- Flag Seal

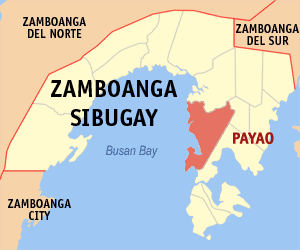
- Map of Zamboanga Sibugay with Payao highlighted
- Interactive map of Payao
- Location within the Philippines
- Coordinates: 7°35′09″N 122°48′08″E
- Country: Philippines
- Region: Zamboanga Peninsula
- Province: Zamboanga Sibugay
- District: 1st district
- Barangays: 29 (see Barangays)

Government
  - Type: Sangguniang Bayan
  - Mayor: Joeper H. Mendoza
  - Vice Mayor: Joel J. Indino
  - Representative: Wilter W. Palma II
  - Municipal Council: Members: Joshua Carlo R. Mendoza; Jerry B. Jemlani; Editha T. Indino; Saraman B. Badol; Glady A. Lopez; Renato U. Cawanan; Flordelyn T. Banagan; Paulino M. Maata Jr.
  - Electorate: 21,784 voters (2025)

Area
  - Total: 245.66 km^{2} (94.85 sq mi)
- Elevation: 20 m (66 ft)
- Highest elevation: 333 m (1,093 ft)
- Lowest elevation: −5 m (−16 ft)

Population (2024 census)
  - Total: 33,156
  - Density: 134.97/km^{2} (349.56/sq mi)
  - Households: 8,380

Economy
  - Income class: 2nd municipal income class
  - Poverty incidence: 24.92% (2023)
  - Revenue: ₱ 195.1 million (2024)
  - Assets: ₱ 616.5 million (2024)
  - Expenditure: ₱ 78.95 million (2024)
  - Liabilities: ₱ 163.1 million (2024)

Service provider
  - Electricity: Zamboanga del Sur 2 Electric Cooperative (ZAMSURECO 2)
- Time zone: UTC+8 (PST)
- ZIP code: 7008
- PSGC: 0908311000
- IDD : area code: +63 (0)62
- Native languages: Subanon; Cebuano; Chavacano; Tagalog
- Website: www.payaosibugay.gov.ph

Payao, officially the Municipality of Payao (Cebuano: Lungsod sa Payao; Subanon: Benwa Payao; Maguindanaon: Inged nu Payao; Chavacano: Municipalidad de Payao; Tagalog: Bayan ng Payao), is a municipality in the province of Zamboanga Sibugay, Philippines. According to the 2024 census, it has a population of 33,156 people.

== History ==
The municipality was established on November 11, 1977, by virtue of Presidential Decree No. 1238 signed by President Ferdinand Marcos, constituting thirteen barangays separated from Siay, which was then part of Zamboanga del Sur, with Payao as the seat of government.

=== Territorial dispute (Guintolan) ===
Issues concerning territorial jurisdiction over Barangay Guintolan led to two judicial proceedings between Payao and Imelda (also created, same day). Guintolan was situated between the municipalities, both are geographically adjacent.

Residents later petitioned the transfer of the barangay from the jurisdiction of Payao to that of Imelda. In 1987, the Sangguniang Panlalawigan of Zamboanga del Sur issued resolutions, unanimously approving and, with the approval of the involved municipal mayors, proclaiming that Guintolan would be under the territorial jurisdiction of Imelda. Payao filed a petition for nullification of the transfer before Pagadian Regional Trial Court (RTC) Branch 19, questioning the provincial board's authority to do so, which was granted on November 18, 1987.

Imelda, seeking to regain Guintolan, later twice filed Petitions for Mandamus against Payao. The first, with provincial officials of Zamboanga del Sur as co-respondents, was dismissed by the Pagadian RTC Branch 21 in 2001; the second was granted by the Ipil RTC Branch 24 in 2015. The provincial government of Zamboanga Sibugay had assessed the matter as a boundary dispute.

Payao lost in their appeals before the Court of Appeals in 2018, and eventually, the Supreme Court on June 28, 2021.

== Geography ==
=== Barangays ===
Payao is politically subdivided into 28 barangays. Each barangay consists of puroks while some have sitios.

- Balian
- Balogo
- Balungisan
- Binangonan
- Bulacan
- Bulawan
- Calape
- Dalama
- Fatima (Silal)
- Guiwan
- Katipunan
- Kima
- Kulasian
- Kulisap
- La Fortuna
- Labatan
- Mayabo (Santa Maria)
- Minundas (Santo. Niño)
- Mountain View (Puluan)
- Nanan
- Poblacion (Payao)
- San Isidro
- San Roque
- San Vicente (Binangonan)
- Silal
- Sumilong
- Talaptap
- Upper Sumilong

=== Climate ===
Climate data for Payao, Zamboanga Sibugay
Month	Jan	Feb	Mar	Apr	May	Jun	Jul	Aug	Sep	Oct	Nov	Dec	Year
Mean daily maximum °C (°F)	31 (88)	31 (88)	31 (88)	31 (88)	30 (86)	29 (84)	29 (84)	29 (84)	29 (84)	29 (84)	30 (86)	30 (86)	30 (86)
Mean daily minimum °C (°F)	23 (73)	23 (73)	23 (73)	24 (75)	25 (77)	25 (77)	24 (75)	24 (75)	24 (75)	24 (75)	24 (75)	23 (73)	24 (75)
Average precipitation mm (inches)	61 (2.4)	55 (2.2)	75 (3.0)	81 (3.2)	145 (5.7)	189 (7.4)	189 (7.4)	197 (7.8)	162 (6.4)	181 (7.1)	115 (4.5)	70 (2.8)	1,520 (59.9)
Average rainy days	16.4	15.7	19.1	21.5	26.9	27.1	26.4	25.0	24.2	26.8	23.5	18.7	271.3
Source: Meteoblue

== Demographics ==
Population census of Payao
Year	Pop.	±% p.a.
1980	17,526	—
1990	23,937	+3.17%
1995	25,013	+0.83%
2000	27,036	+1.68%
2007	27,623	+0.30%
2010	29,755	+2.74%
2015	31,686	+1.20%
2020	34,952	+2.09%
2024	33,156	−1.26%
Source: Philippine Statistics Authority

== Economy ==
Poverty incidence of Payao (%)

Source: Philippine Statistics Authority
