= Imelda, Zamboanga Sibugay =

Municipality in Zamboanga Sibugay, Philippines

Imelda
- Municipality
- Municipality of Imelda
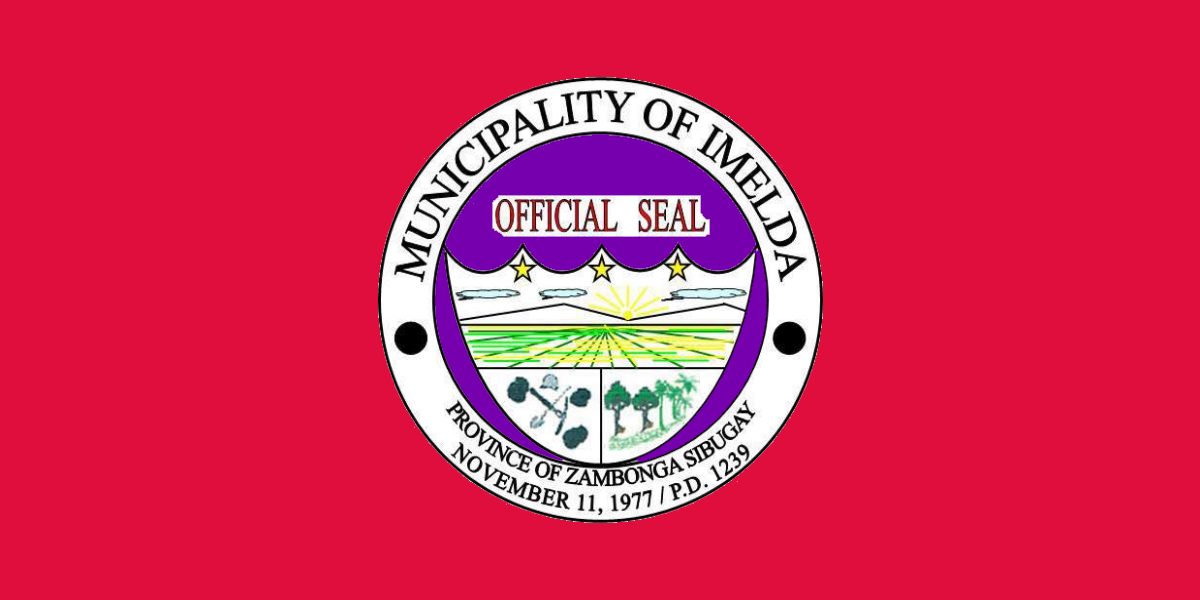
- Flag Seal

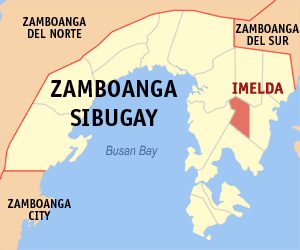
- Map of Zamboanga Sibugay with Imelda highlighted
- Interactive map of Imelda
- Location within the Philippines
- Coordinates: 7°38′34″N 122°56′05″E
- Country: Philippines
- Region: Zamboanga Peninsula
- Province: Zamboanga Sibugay
- District: 1st district
- Founded: 11 November 1977
- Named for: Imelda Marcos
- Barangays: 18 (see Barangays)

Government
  - Type: Sangguniang Bayan
  - Mayor: Roselyn V. Silva
  - Vice Mayor: Ruth E. Roble
  - Representative: Wilter Y. Palma
  - Municipal Council: Members: Goldyluck V. Silva; Carla Kris A. Quintilla; Arnold S. Yanga; Joey C. Vergara; Bruno P. Doring; Manuel Luis L. Talaver Jr.; Ronie P. Suela; Ernesto P. Pardillo
  - Electorate: 18,877 voters (2025)

Area
  - Total: 255.51 km^{2} (98.65 sq mi)
- Elevation: 76 m (249 ft)
- Highest elevation: 454 m (1,490 ft)
- Lowest elevation: 16 m (52 ft)

Population (2024 census)
  - Total: 29,652
  - Density: 116.05/km^{2} (300.57/sq mi)
  - Households: 6,074

Economy
  - Income class: 3rd municipal income class
  - Poverty incidence: 20.93% (2023)
  - Revenue: ₱ 154.6 million (2024)
  - Assets: ₱ 553 million (2024)
  - Expenditure: ₱ 55.17 million (2024)
  - Liabilities: ₱ 191 million (2024)

Service provider
  - Electricity: Zamboanga del Sur 2 Electric Cooperative (ZAMSURECO 2)
- Time zone: UTC+8 (PST)
- ZIP code: 7007
- PSGC: 0908304000
- IDD : area code: +63 (0)62
- Native languages: Subanon; Cebuano; Chavacano; Tagalog

Imelda, officially the Municipality of Imelda (Cebuano: Lungsod sa Imelda; Chavacano: Municipalidad de Imelda; Tagalog: Bayan ng Imelda), is a municipality in the province of Zamboanga Sibugay, Philippines. According to the 2024 census, it has a population of 29,652 people.

The municipality is the least populous in the province and the third smallest in area.

== History ==
The municipality was established on November 11, 1977, by virtue of Presidential Decree No. 1239 signed by President Ferdinand Marcos, constituting a total of nineteen barangays taken from Malangas (7, including Sta. Fe which would be the seat of government), Siay (9), and Alicia (3), all then part of Zamboanga del Sur.

It is named after First Lady Imelda Marcos.

The first mayor who established imelda is Hon.Frank C. Piesta Sr.

=== Territorial dispute (Guintolan) ===
Issues concerning territorial jurisdiction over Barangay Guintolan led to two judicial proceedings between Imelda and Payao (also created, same day). Guintolan was situated between the municipalities, both are geographically adjacent.

Residents later petitioned the transfer of the barangay from the jurisdiction of Payao to that of Imelda. In 1987, the Sangguniang Panlalawigan of Zamboanga del Sur issued resolutions, unanimously approving and, with the approval of the involved municipal mayors, proclaiming that Guintolan would be under the territorial jurisdiction of Imelda. However, on November 18, 1987, the Pagadian Regional Trial Court (RTC) Branch 19 nullified the transfer upon granting a petition filed by Payao, which questioned the provincial board's authority to do so.

Imelda, seeking to regain Guintolan, later twice filed Petitions for Mandamus. The first was filed against Payao and provincial officials of Zamboanga del Sur before Pagadian RTC Branch 21, which was dismissed in August 15, 2001. The second was filed against Payao before Ipil RTC Branch 24. (In 2000, Zamboanga Sibugay had been created, separating portions of Zamboanga del Sur.)

In 2006, the Sangguniang Bayan of Imelda requested various government agencies for the immediate transfer of Guintolan to its territorial jurisdiction. The provincial government of Zamboanga Sibugay later assessed the matter as a boundary dispute.

The latter petition was granted on April 1, 2015. The decision was affirmed, both by the Court of Appeals on February 28, 2018, and eventually, by the Supreme Court on June 28, 2021.

== Geography ==
=== Barangays ===
Imelda is politically subdivided into 19 barangays. Each barangay consists of puroks while some have sitios.

- Balugo
- Bolungisan
- Baluyan
- Cana-an
- Dumpoc
- Gandiangan
- Guintolan
- Israel (Balian Israel)
- Lower Baluran
- La Victoria
- Little Baguio
- Lumbog
- Lumpanac
- Mali Little Baguio
- Poblacion (Santa Fe)
- Pulawan (Mountain View)
- San Jose
- Santa Barbara
- Upper Baluran

=== Climate ===
Climate data for Imelda, Zamboanga Sibugay
Month	Jan	Feb	Mar	Apr	May	Jun	Jul	Aug	Sep	Oct	Nov	Dec	Year
Mean daily maximum °C (°F)	30 (86)	31 (88)	31 (88)	31 (88)	30 (86)	29 (84)	28 (82)	29 (84)	29 (84)	29 (84)	29 (84)	30 (86)	30 (85)
Mean daily minimum °C (°F)	22 (72)	23 (73)	23 (73)	24 (75)	24 (75)	24 (75)	24 (75)	24 (75)	24 (75)	24 (75)	24 (75)	23 (73)	24 (74)
Average precipitation mm (inches)	61 (2.4)	55 (2.2)	75 (3.0)	81 (3.2)	145 (5.7)	189 (7.4)	189 (7.4)	197 (7.8)	162 (6.4)	181 (7.1)	115 (4.5)	70 (2.8)	1,520 (59.9)
Average rainy days	16.4	15.7	19.1	21.5	26.9	27.1	26.4	25.0	24.2	26.8	23.5	18.7	271.3
Source: Meteoblue

== Demographics ==
Population census of Imelda
Year	Pop.	±% p.a.
1980	5,678	—
1990	16,231	+11.08%
1995	22,760	+6.54%
2000	21,534	−1.18%
2007	24,787	+1.96%
2010	27,903	+4.40%
2015	28,018	+0.08%
2020	26,020	−1.55%
2024	29,652	+3.19%
Source: Philippine Statistics Authority

== Economy ==
Poverty incidence of Imelda (%)

Source: Philippine Statistics Authority

== Government ==
=== Elected officials ===
Imelda Municipal Council (2025 - 2028)
Position	Name	Party
Congressman	Marlo C. Bancoro	PFP
Mayor	Arnoldo L. Famor	NP
Vice Mayor	Frederico B. Gonzales	PFP
Councilors	Allan B. Escamillan	PFP
Councilors	Renato P. Basinang	PFP
Councilors	Rizalinus C. Bajada	NP
Councilors	Alex O. Datoy	NP
Councilors	Ruby J. Claros	PFP
Councilors	Francisco C. Calomohoy Jr.	NP
Councilors	Marlo V. Badlis	NP
Councilors	Romeo R. Insigne	NP
