= Wilter Palma II =

Filipino politician

The Honorable Wilter "Sharky" Palma II
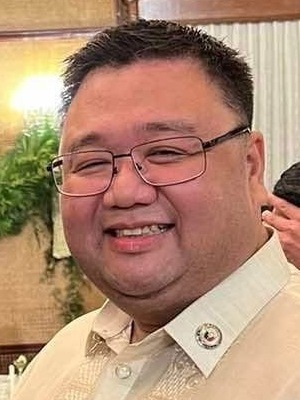
- Palma in 2022

Member of the Philippine House of Representatives from Zamboanga Sibugay's 1st district
- In office June 30, 2016 – June 30, 2022
- Preceded by: Belma Cabilao
- Succeeded by: Wilter Palma

Personal details
- Born: Wilter Wee Palma II; August 4, 1982 (age 44)
- Party: Lakas (2019–present)
- Other political affiliations: PDP–Laban (2016–2019); Liberal (2015–2016)
- Nickname: Sharky

Wilter "Sharky" Wee Palma II (born August 4, 1982) is a Filipino politician from the province of Zamboanga Sibugay. He is served as a Member of the Philippine House of Representatives representing the First District of Zamboanga Sibugay from 2016 to 2022. He is the son of former Representative Wilter Palma.

== Political career ==
Palma was first elected to Congress in 2016, and was reelected in 2019. Although eligible for a third mandate, Palma opted to run for governor to replace his father, Wilter Palma. He was defeated by fellow Zamboanga Sibugay representative Dulce Ann Hofer.
