= Diplahan =

Municipality in Zamboanga Sibugay, Philippines

- Municipality
- Municipality of Diplahan
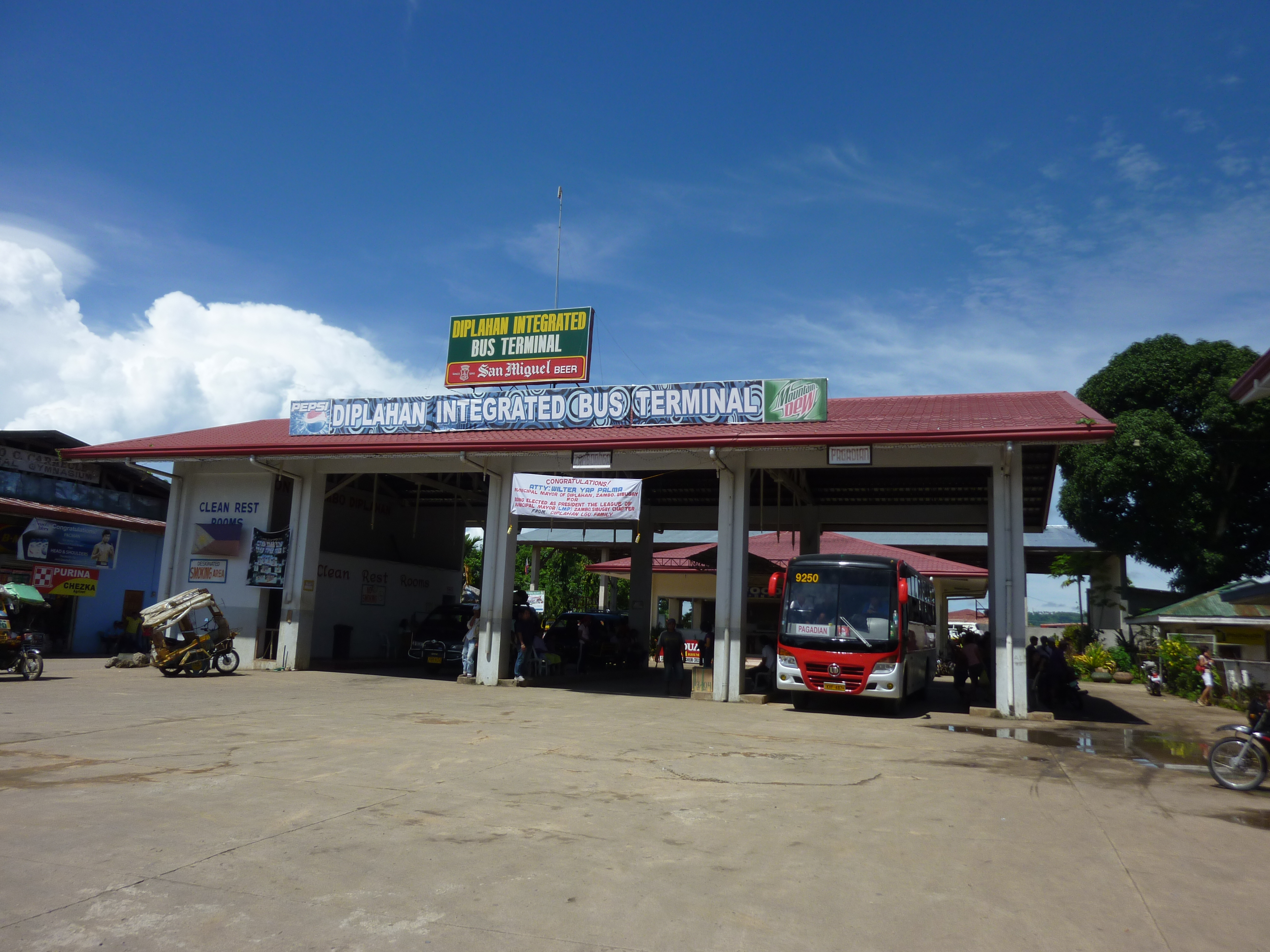
- Integrated Bus Terminal

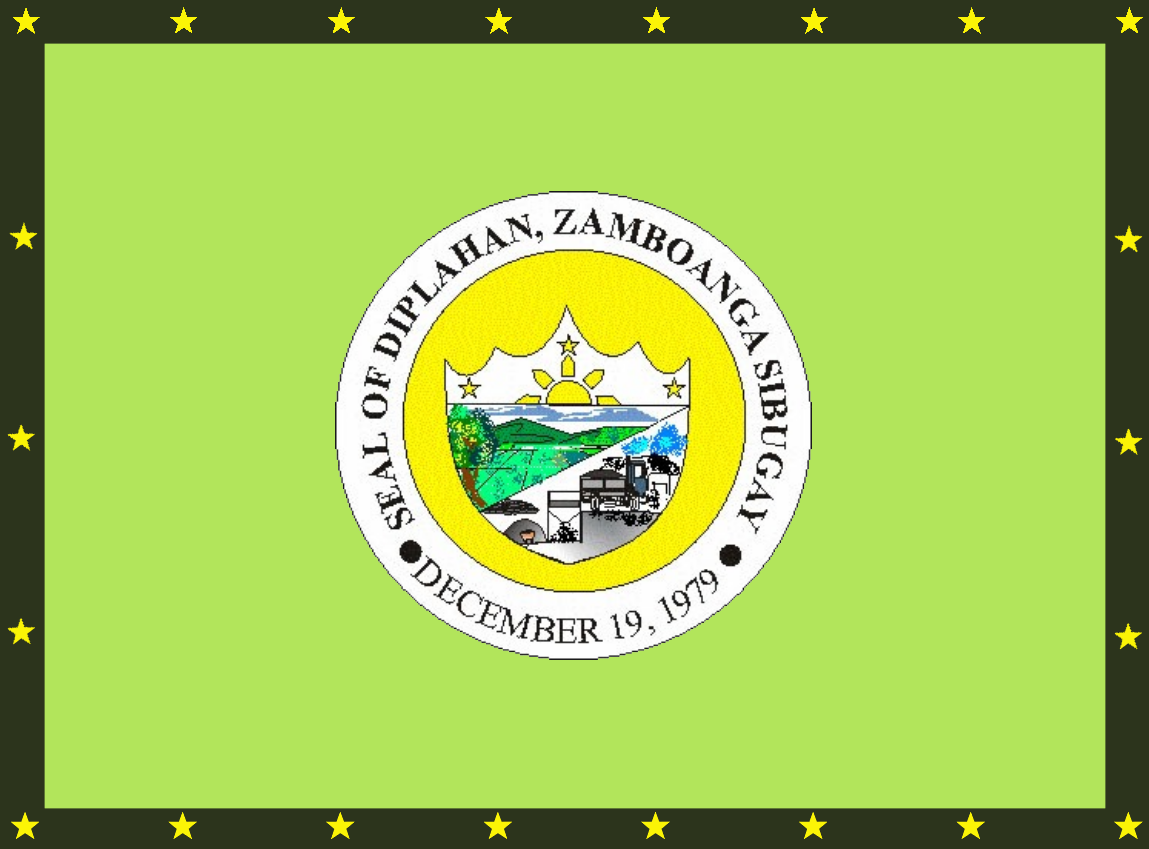
- Flag Seal

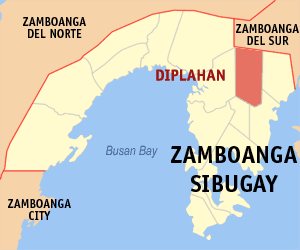
- Map of Zamboanga Sibugay with Diplahan highlighted
- Interactive map of Diplahan
- Location within the Philippines
- Coordinates: 7°41′28″N 122°59′07″E
- Country: Philippines
- Region: Zamboanga Peninsula
- Province: Zamboanga Sibugay
- District: 1st district
- Barangays: 22 (see Barangays)

Government
  - Type: Sangguniang Bayan
  - Mayor: Eric Y. Palma
  - Vice Mayor: Ramil M. Villaruel
  - Representative: Marlo Bancoro
  - Municipal Council: Members: Jernil B. Dela Torre; Ernie John G. Salomes; Danilo S. Abico Sr.; Fedemar B. Dalipe; Chrislie Lusyl Jore; Ricardo Villa; Avelia B. Asuncion; Winnie Bacay
  - Electorate: 22,160 voters (2025)

Area
  - Total: 255.51 km^{2} (98.65 sq mi)
- Elevation: 106 m (348 ft)
- Highest elevation: 369 m (1,211 ft)
- Lowest elevation: 1 m (3.3 ft)

Population (2024 census)
  - Total: 32,423
  - Density: 126.90/km^{2} (328.66/sq mi)
  - Households: 7,370

Economy
  - Income class: 1st municipal income class
  - Poverty incidence: 23.48% (2023)
  - Revenue: ₱ 238.2 million (2024)
  - Assets: ₱ 539.8 million (2024)
  - Expenditure: ₱ 103.7 million (2024)
  - Liabilities: ₱ 164.2 million (2024)

Service provider
  - Electricity: Zamboanga del Sur 2 Electric Cooperative (ZAMSURECO 2)
- Time zone: UTC+8 (PST)
- ZIP code: 7039
- PSGC: 0908303000
- IDD : area code: +63 (0)62
- Native languages: Subanon; Cebuano; Chavacano; Tagalog

Diplahan, officially the Municipality of Diplahan (Cebuano: Lungsod sa Diplahan; Hiligaynon: Banwa sang Diplahan; Chavacano: Municipalidad de Diplahan; Tagalog: Bayan ng Diplahan), is a municipality in the province of Zamboanga Sibugay, Philippines. According to the 2024 census, it has a population of 32,423 people.

== Geography ==
=== Barangays ===
Diplahan is politically subdivided into 22 barangays. Each barangay consists of puroks while some have sitios.

- Balangao
- Butong
- Ditay
- Gaulan
- Goling
- Guinoman
- Kauswagan
- Lindang
- Lobing
- Luop
- Manangon
- Mejo
- Natan
- Paradise
- Pilar
- Poblacion (Diplahan)
- Sampoli A
- Sampoli B
- Santa Cruz
- Songcuya
- Tinongtongan
- Tuno

=== Climate ===
Based on the Köppen climate classification, Diplahan is considered a tropical rainforest climate (Köppen climate classification Af).

Climate data for Diplahan, Zamboanga Sibugay
Month	Jan	Feb	Mar	Apr	May	Jun	Jul	Aug	Sep	Oct	Nov	Dec	Year
Mean daily maximum °C (°F)	29 (84)	30 (86)	30 (86)	30 (86)	29 (84)	28 (82)	28 (82)	28 (82)	28 (82)	28 (82)	29 (84)	29 (84)	29 (84)
Mean daily minimum °C (°F)	22 (72)	22 (72)	22 (72)	23 (73)	23 (73)	23 (73)	23 (73)	23 (73)	23 (73)	23 (73)	23 (73)	22 (72)	23 (73)
Average precipitation mm (inches)	61 (2.4)	55 (2.2)	75 (3.0)	81 (3.2)	145 (5.7)	189 (7.4)	189 (7.4)	197 (7.8)	162 (6.4)	181 (7.1)	115 (4.5)	70 (2.8)	1,520 (59.9)
Average rainy days	16.4	15.7	19.1	21.5	26.9	27.1	26.4	25.0	24.2	26.8	23.5	18.7	271.3
Source: Meteoblue

== Demographics ==
Population census of Diplahan
Year	Pop.	±% p.a.
1980	15,899	—
1990	21,221	+2.93%
1995	25,818	+3.74%
2000	23,909	−1.63%
2007	28,010	+2.21%
2010	31,215	+4.02%
2015	32,428	+0.73%
2020	32,585	+0.10%
2024	32,423	−0.12%
Source: Philippine Statistics Authority

== Economy ==
Poverty incidence of Diplahan (%)

Source: Philippine Statistics Authority

== Government ==
=== Elected officials ===
Diplahan Municipal Council (2025–2028)
Position	Name	Party
Congressman	Marlo C. Bancoro	PFP
Mayor	Eric Y. Palma	Lakas
Vice Mayor	Ramil M. Villaruel	Lakas
Councilors	Jernil B. Dela Torre	Lakas
Councilors	Ernie John G. Salomes	Lakas
Councilors	Danilo S. Abico Sr.	Lakas
Councilors	Fedemar B. Dalipe	Lakas
Councilors	Chrislie Lusyl V. Jore	Lakas
Councilors	Ricardo G. Villa	Lakas
Councilors	Avelia "Vel" B. Asuncion	Lakas
Councilors	Winnie V. Bacay	Lakas

== Notable personalities ==
- Wilter Palma - former governor of Zamboanga Sibugay (2013–2022); former mayor of Diplahan (2004–2013)
