= Alicia, Zamboanga Sibugay =

Municipality in The Province of Zamboanga Sibugay, Philippines

Alicia
- Municipality
- Municipality of Alicia
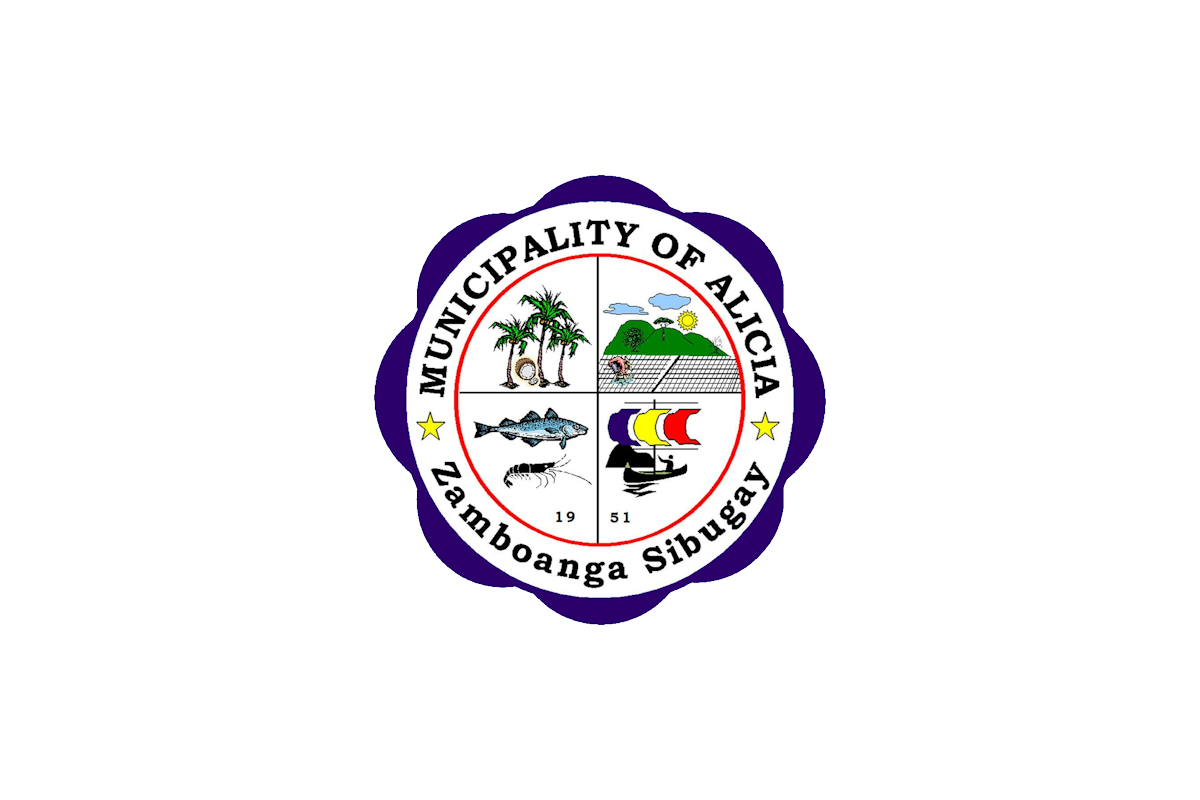
- Flag Seal
- Interactive map of Alicia
- Location within the Philippines
- Coordinates: 7°30′22″N 122°56′28″E
- Country: Philippines
- Region: Zamboanga Peninsula
- Province: Zamboanga Sibugay
- District: 1st district
- Barangays: 27 (see Barangays)

Government
  - Type: Sangguniang Bayan
  - Mayor: Ardin "Alvie" B. Musa
  - Vice Mayor: Ismael "Jun" B. Escamillan Jr.
  - Representative: Marlo Bancoro
  - Municipal Council: Members: Laarnie Milallos L. Laja; April Jahara S. Gubat; Dante D. Buhayan; Rhine A. Tan; Charito D. De Asis; Said A. Ahiron; Luther S. Parojinog; Jape P. Encarnacion
  - Electorate: 25,212 voters (2025)

Area
  - Total: 183.08 km^{2} (70.69 sq mi)
- Elevation: 22 m (72 ft)
- Highest elevation: 271 m (889 ft)
- Lowest elevation: −4 m (−13 ft)

Population (2024 census)
  - Total: 39,484
  - Density: 215.67/km^{2} (558.57/sq mi)
  - Households: 9,173

Economy
  - Income class: 2nd municipal income class
  - Poverty incidence: 23.5% (2023)
  - Revenue: ₱ 197.7 million (2024)
  - Assets: ₱ 550.3 million (2024)
  - Expenditure: ₱ 71.11 million (2024)
  - Liabilities: ₱ 160.6 million (2024)

Service provider
  - Electricity: Zamboanga del Sur 2 Electric Cooperative (ZAMSURECO 2)
- Time zone: UTC+8 (PST)
- ZIP code: 7040
- PSGC: 0908301000
- IDD : area code: +63 (0)62
- Native languages: Subanon; Cebuano; Chavacano; Tagalog; Maguindanao; Maranao; Tausug
- Website: www.aliciasibugay.gov.ph

Alicia, officially the Municipality of Alicia (Cebuano: Lungsod sa Alicia; Chavacano: Municipalidad de Alicia; Tagalog: Bayan ng Alicia; Maguindanao: Inged nu Alicia; Maranao: Inged a Alicia; Tausug: Lupah Alicia), is a municipality in the province of Zamboanga Sibugay, Philippines. According to the 2024 census, it has a population of 39,484 people. Alicia is the gateway to Olutanga Island via Guicam Port in Brgy. Guicam where the Guicam Bridge will soon rise.

== History ==
By virtue of Executive Order No. 468 signed by President Elpidio Quirino on August 22, 1951, the municipality of Alicia (originally proposed as Naga-Naga) was organized, separated from Margosatubig in the old Zamboanga province. The municipality contains ten barrios with Naga-Naga the seat of the government.

Three barangays were detached from Alicia, and along with parts of Malangas and Siay, were constituted into the new municipality of Imelda in 1977.

On April 20, 1986, OIC Mayor Abdulgafar Lutian, an appointee of President Corazon Aquino who replaced KBL Mayor Harun Kiram in the aftermath of the People Power Revolution, was assassinated by a lone gunman that escaped on a motorcycle; he was the first Aquino administration appointee to have been assassinated after the return of democracy in the Philippines.

== Geography ==
=== Barangays ===
Alicia is politically subdivided into 27 barangays. Each barangay consists of puroks while some have sitios.

- Alegria
- Bagong Buhay
- Bella
- Calades
- Concepcion
- Dawa-dawa
- Gulayon
- Ilisan
- Kapatagan
- Kauswagan
- Kawayan
- La Paz
- Lambuyogan
- Lapirawan
- Litayon
- Lutiman
- Milagrosa (Baluno)
- Naga-naga
- Pandan-pandan
- Payongan
- Poblacion
- Santa Maria
- Santo Niño
- Talaptap
- Tampalan
- Tandiong Muslim
- Timbang-timbang

=== Climate ===
Climate data for Alicia, Zamboanga Sibugay
Month	Jan	Feb	Mar	Apr	May	Jun	Jul	Aug	Sep	Oct	Nov	Dec	Year
Mean daily maximum °C (°F)	31 (88)	31 (88)	31 (88)	31 (88)	30 (86)	29 (84)	29 (84)	29 (84)	29 (84)	29 (84)	30 (86)	30 (86)	30 (86)
Mean daily minimum °C (°F)	23 (73)	23 (73)	24 (75)	24 (75)	25 (77)	25 (77)	24 (75)	24 (75)	24 (75)	24 (75)	24 (75)	23 (73)	24 (75)
Average precipitation mm (inches)	61 (2.4)	55 (2.2)	75 (3.0)	81 (3.2)	145 (5.7)	189 (7.4)	189 (7.4)	197 (7.8)	162 (6.4)	181 (7.1)	115 (4.5)	70 (2.8)	1,520 (59.9)
Average rainy days	16.4	15.7	19.1	21.5	26.9	27.1	26.4	25.0	24.2	26.8	23.5	18.7	271.3
Source: Meteoblue (Use with caution: this is modeled/calculated data, not measured locally.)

== Demographics ==
Population census of Alicia
Year	Pop.	±% p.a.
1960	13,277	—
1970	19,272	+3.79%
1975	14,173	−5.98%
1980	20,591	+7.75%
1990	24,803	+1.88%
1995	27,959	+2.27%
2000	29,954	+1.49%
2007	32,289	+1.04%
2010	34,895	+2.86%
2015	36,013	+0.60%
2020	39,456	+1.94%
2024	39,484	+0.02%
Source: Philippine Statistics Authority

== Economy ==
Poverty incidence of Alicia (%)

Source: Philippine Statistics Authority

== Government ==
=== Elected officials ===
Alicia Municipal Council (2025 - 2028)
Position	Name	Party
Congressman	Marlo C. Bancoro	PFP
Mayor	Ardin "Alvie" B. Musa	PFP
Vice Mayor	Ismael "Jun" B. Escamillan Jr.	PFP
Councilors	Laarnie L. Laja	PFP
Councilors	April Jahara S. Gubat	PFP
Councilors	Dante D. Buhayan	PFP
Councilors	Flina Rhina "Rhine" A. Tan	PFP
Councilors	Charito D. De Asis	PFP
Councilors	Abdusaid "Said" A. Ahiron	PFP
Councilors	Luther S. Parojinog	PFP
Councilors	Jape P. Encarnacion	PFP
