= Guicam Bridge =

Olutanga Bridge Tulay ng Olutanga
- Coordinates: 7.4359778°N 122.837814°E
- Carries: 2 lanes of Lutiman-Guicam-Olutanga Road; Pedestrians and vehicles
- Crosses: Canalizo Strait
- Locale: Alicia and Mabuhay, Zamboanga Sibugay
- Named for: Barangay Guicam in Alicia, Zamboanga Sibugay
- Maintained by: Department of Public Works and Highways

Characteristics
- Design: Girder bridge
- Total length: 1.2 km (0.75 mi)
- Longest span: 540.80 m (1,774.3 ft)
- Clearance above: 14.8 km (9.2 mi)
- No. of lanes: Two-lane single carriageway

History
- Construction start: 29 January 2021
- Construction cost: PH₱ 1.06 billion
- Opened: September 29, 2026

Location
- Interactive map of Olutanga Bridge

The Olutanga Bridge is a 1.2 km (0.75 mi) concrete girder bridge between the towns of Alicia and Mabuhay in Zamboanga Sibugay, Philippines. The bridge connects Olutanga Island and its three municipalities of Mabuhay, Talusan, and Olutanga with the rest of Mindanao Island, which are separated by the Canalizo Strait.

== History ==
According to the Philippine Statistics Authority in its province poverty incidence survey in 2015, Zamboanga Sibugay placed 19 in the 20 poorest provinces in the Philippines. Among its underserved municipalities are located in Olutanga Island, particularly the municipalities of Mabuhay, Talusan, and Olutanga, which are separated from the rest of the province by a narrow channel. Residents of the three municipalities travel to the mainland by crossing the channel on a motorized bangka or car ferry to Guicam Port in the town of Alicia, Zamboanga Sibugay.

To improve stimulate economic growth and development in Zamboanga Sibugay and the rest of mainland Mindanao, the Philippine government requested the Asian Development Bank (ADB) to finance the Improving Growth Corridors in Mindanao Road Sector Project (IGCMRSP), which aims to establish the Zamboanga Peninsula region as the Agri-Fisheries Southern Corridor of the Philippines, as part of the Brunei Darussalam–Indonesia–Malaysia–Philippines East ASEAN Growth Area (BIMP-EAGA). The IGCMRSP consists of nine sub-projects for Mindanao with three core and six non-core sub-projects and has a total cost of US$503 million or PH₱25.2 billion. Guicam Bridge is one of the six non-core sub-projects under IGCMRSP. The construction of Guicam Bridge is aimed at helping facilitate economic development in the region, improve peace and security in conflict-affected areas, and catalyze complementary public and private investment.

On 14 December 2017, the ADB agreed to shoulder a portion of the IGCMRSP project with a US$380 million (PH₱19 billion) loan, with the Philippine government shouldering US$123 million (PH₱6.1 billion) of the total cost. The loan agreement was signed on 10 January 2018 and became effective on 23 March 2018. The Philippine government allotted PH₱1.06 billion for the construction of Guicam Bridge.

As of June 2020, construction of the bridge is still under procurement with Department of Public Works and Highways.

== See also ==
- Panguil Bay Bridge
- Davao–Samal Bridge
