= Sama–Bajaw languages =

Austronesian language family of Borneo and the Philippines

Sama–Bajaw
- Geographic distribution: Sulu Archipelago and Capul, between the Philippines, Borneo, Sulawesi, Indonesia
- Linguistic classification: Austronesian: Malayo-Polynesian; Basap-Greater Barito; Greater Barito; Sama–Bajaw
- Proto-language: Proto-Sama–Bajaw

Language codes
- Glottolog: sama1302

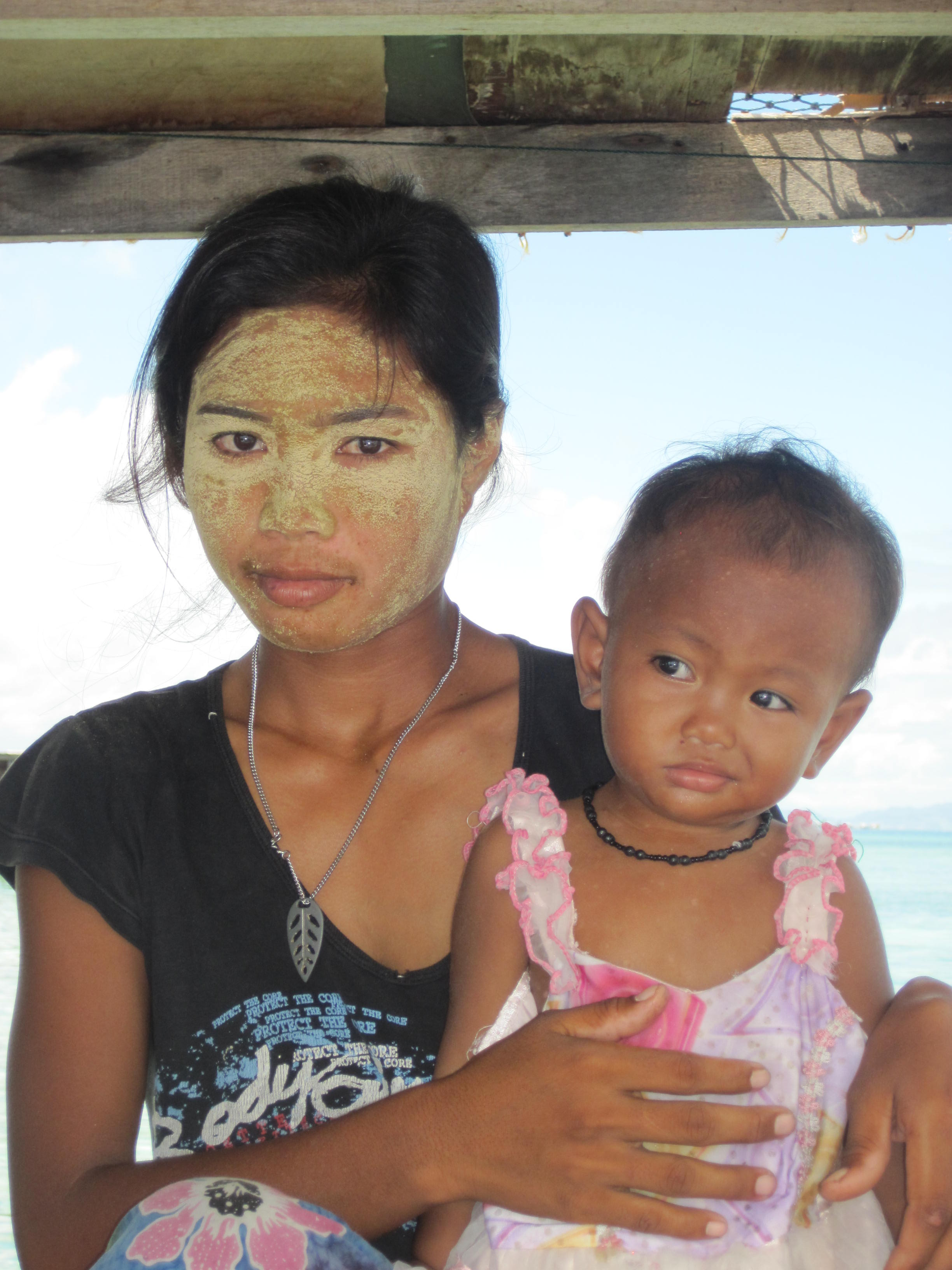
The Sinama speakers of Semporna, Malaysia are known as Bajau. This Bajau woman wears "borak", the traditional sun protection.

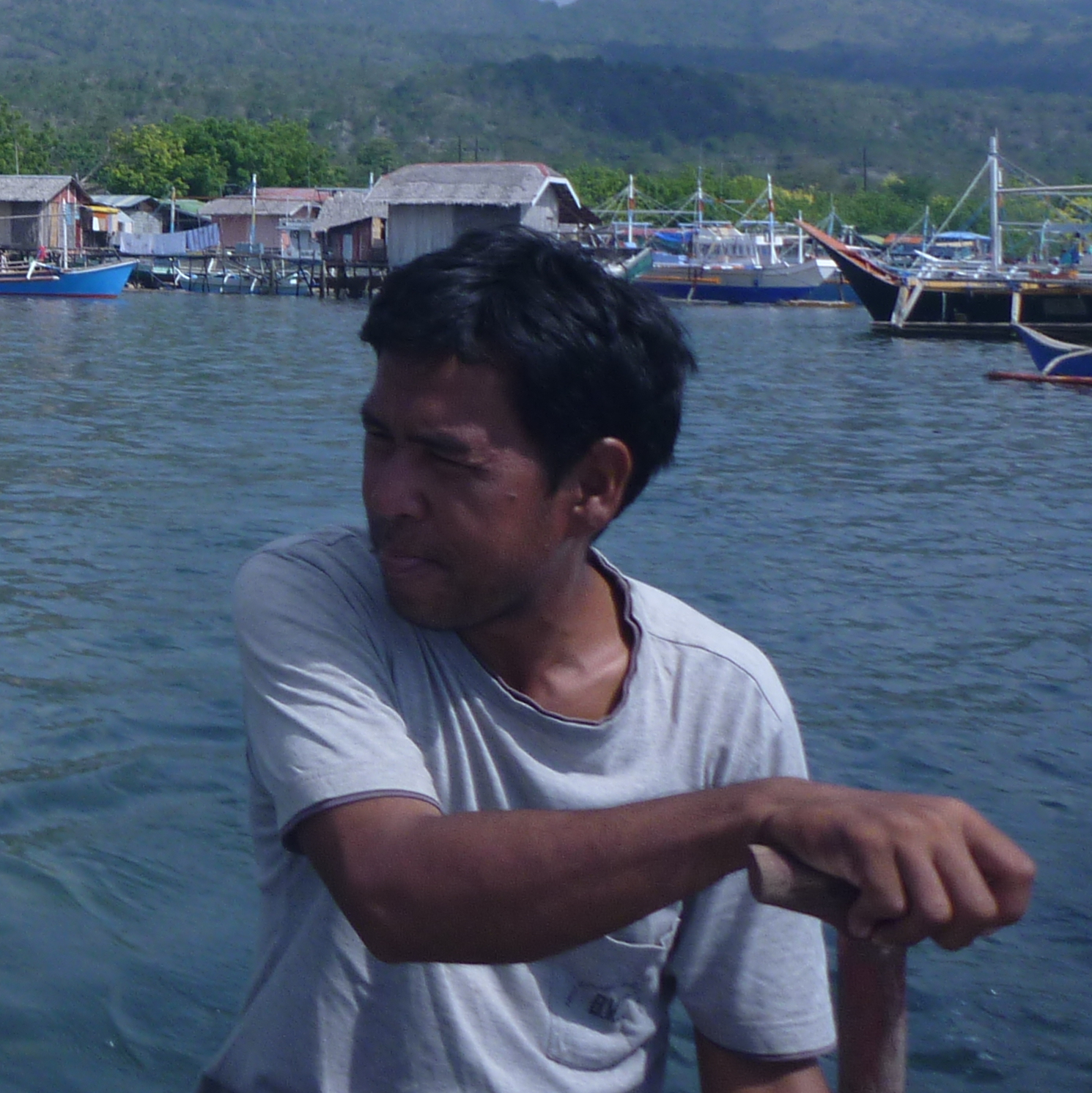
Rowing out from Tinutuꞌ Village, a Sama village outside of Sulu where several Central Sinama dialects are spoken, most notably Sinama Musuꞌ and Sinama Silumpak

The Sama–Bajaw languages are a well-established group of languages spoken by the Sama-Bajau peoples (Aꞌa sama) of the Philippines, Indonesia, and Malaysia.

== Languages ==
Grimes (2003) identifies nine Sama–Bajaw languages.

1. Balangingi (Bangingiꞌ; Northern Sama)
2. Central Sama (Siasa Sama)
3. Southern Sama (Sinama)
4. Pangutaran Sama (Siyama)
5. Mapun (Kagayan)
6. Yakan
7. Abaknon (Inabaknon)
8. Indonesian Bajau
9. West Coast Bajau

The first six are spoken in the Sulu region of the southern Philippines. Indonesian Bajau is spoken mainly in Sulawesi and West Coast Bajau in Sabah, Borneo. Several dialects of the languages can be identified.

Blust (2006) states that lexical evidence indicates that Sama–Bajaw originated in the Barito region of southeast Borneo, although not from any established group of Barito languages. Ethnologue has followed, calling the resulting group 'Greater Barito'.

== Classification ==
Pallesen (1985:18) classifies the Sama–Bajaw languages as follows.

- **Sama-Bajaw**
  - Abaknon
  - Yakan: Northern Yakan, Southern Yakan
  - Sibuguey (Sama Batuan)
  - Sulu-Borneo
    - Western Sulu: Sama Pangutaran, Sama Ubian
    - Inner Sulu
      - Northern Sulu: Tagtabun Balangingiq, Tongquil Balangingiq, Linungan, Panigayan Balangingiq, Landang-Guaq, Mati, Sama Daongdong, Kawit Balangingiq, Karundung, Pilas
      - Central Sulu: Sama Kaulungan, Sama Dilaut, Sama Kabingan, Sama Musuq, Sama Laminusa, Sama Balimbing, Sama Bannaran, Sama Bangaw-Bangaw, South Ubian
      - Southern Sulu: Sama Tanduq-baas, Sama Simunul, Sama Pahut, Sama Sibutuq, Sama Sampulnaq
      - Sama Lutangan, Sama Sibukuq
    - Borneo Coast
      - Jama Mapun
      - Sabah Land Bajaw: Kota Belud Bajaw, Kawang Bajaw, Papar Bajaw, Banggi Bajaw, Putatan Bajaw
      - Indonesian Bajaw: Sulamu, Kajoa, Roti, Jaya Bakti, Poso, Togian 1, Wallace, Togian 2, Minahasa

The Ethnologue divides Sinama into seven languages based on mutual intelligibility. The seven Sinama languages are Northern Sinama, Central Sinama, Southern Sinama, Sinama Pangutaran from the island of Pangutaran off of Jolo island, Mapun, Bajau West Coast of Sabah and Bajau Indonesia. Jama Mapun, a language from the island of Mapun, formerly known as Cagayan de Sulu, is a related language and sometimes also referred to as Sinama. These classifications are rarely recognized by Sama themselves who instead classify their Sinama by the village or island it originates from. The emic classification of a Sama person's language e.g. Silumpak, Laminusa, Tabawan generally form the different dialects of the seven Sinama or Bajau languages.

Together, West Coast Bajau, Indonesian Bajau, and Mapun comprise a Borneo Coast Bajaw branch in Ethnologue.

=== Dialects ===
The following is a list of Sama-Bajaw dialects. Locations and demographics are from Palleson (1985) and Ethnologue (individual languages with separately assigned ISO codes highlighted in bold).

- **West Coast Bajau**
  - Kota Belud: Kota Belud, 60 km north of Kota Kinabalu
  - Putatan
  - Papar: Papar, 50 km south of Kota Kinabalu
  - Banggi: Banggi Island, north of Kudat in the north of Sabah
  - Sandakan
  - Pitas
  - Kawang: Kawang, 40 km south of Kota Kinabalu
- **Indonesian Bajau**
  - Jampea
  - Sameꞌ
  - Matalaang
  - Sulamu: Sulamu, Kupang Bay, southern Timor. 400 speakers.
  - Kajoa: Kajoa Island, 80 km south of Ternate off the west coast of Halmahera
  - Roti: Roti Island, southwest of Timor. Fewer than 200 speakers.
  - Jaya Bakti: Jaya Bakti, Banggai Regency, central Sulawesi. 3,000 speakers.
  - Poso: Polande, Poso Regency, on the southeast coast of the Gulf of Poso, central Sulawesi
  - Togian 1: Pulaw Enaw, just off the south coast of Togian Island, Gulf of Tomini, Sulawesi
  - Togian 2: Togian Islands, Gulf of Tomini, Sulawesi
  - Wallace: exact location unknown, probably central Moluccas. 117 words collected by Alfred Russel Wallace around 1860.
- Inabaknon: Capul Island, off the coast of northwestern Samar, central Philippines
- Yakan: eastern Basilan Island, southern Zamboanga Peninsula. 60,000 speakers.
  - Northern Yakan: northern part of eastern Basilan Island
  - Southern Yakan: southern part of eastern Basilan Island
- **Pangutaran Sama** (Western Sulu Sama branch)
  - Sama Pangutaran: Pangutaran Island, 50 km northwest of Jolo City. 12,000 speakers. Some live in Palawan
  - Sama Ubihan: North Ubian Island, a few miles southwest of Pangutaran. 2,000 speakers. Also called aꞌa ubian, aꞌa sowang bunaꞌ 'people of Bunaꞌ channel'.
- Inner Sulu Sama branch
  - **Northern Sama** (Northern Sulu in Pallesen (1985))
    - Lutangan (Lutango): mainland of Mindanao opposite Olutanga Island
    - Sibuco-Vitali (Sibukuꞌ): inland area across the Zamboanga Peninsula, 50 km north of Zamboanga City. 11,000 speakers. Also called sama bitaliꞌ, sama nawan.
    - Sibuguey (Batuan): Kulasihan River on the eastern side of Sibuguey Bay between Olutanga Island and the head of the bay
    - Balangingi
    - Daongdung (Sama Daongdong): Daongdong Island, off the southeast coast of Jolo Island
    - Kabingaꞌan
    - Tagtabun Balangingiꞌ: Tagtabun Island, just east of Zamboanga City. Regular population of 300 as of 1972. Also called bahasa bāngingi' (bāngingiꞌ, aꞌa tagtabun).
    - Tongquil Balangingiꞌ: Tongquil Island in the Samales group, east of Jolo Island. 8,000 speakers. Also called sama tongkil.
    - Linungan: Linungan (Linongan) or Cocos Island, off the northeast coast of Basilan Island
    - Panigayan Balangingiꞌ: Malamawi Island, just off the west coast of Basilan Island. Several hundred speakers. Also called bahasa balangingiꞌ (sama bāngingiꞌ).
    - Landang-Guaꞌ: Sakol or Landang Island, just east of Zamboanga City, north of Tagtabun Island. Also called aꞌa landang-guaꞌ ('Landang-Guaꞌ people').
    - Mati: Mati, Davao Oriental, just east of the San Agustin Peninsula
    - Kawit Balangingiꞌ: Kawit, 10 km west of Zamboanga City
    - Karundung: Karundung, on the southeast coast of Jolo Island
    - Pilas: Pilas Islands, 15 km west of Basilan Island
  - **Central Sama**
    - Sama Deya
    - Sama Dilaut: throughout Sulu, but especially in Zamboanga City, in Siasi, and in Sitangkai, south of Tawi-Tawi Island. 80,000 speakers in the Philippines. Also called sama toꞌongan 'genuine Sama'; sama pagūng 'floating Sama'; sama palaꞌu 'boat-dwelling Sama'.
    - Sama Siasi
    - Sama Laminusa: Laminusa Island, just off the north coast of Siasi Island. 5,000 speakers.
    - Sama Tabawan
    - Sama Kaulungan: Kaulungan Island, just off the eastern end of Basilan Island. At least 1,000 speakers.
    - Sama Musuꞌ: south coast of Siasi Island. 3,000 speakers. Intermarriage with Sama Dilaut. Also called Sama Lipid (Littoral Sama) by the Sama Dilaut (Sea Sama).
    - Sama Balimbing: Balimbing, on the east coast of Tawi-Tawi Island (listed as part of Southern Sama in Ethnologue)
    - Sama Bannaran: Bannaran Island, Sapa-Sapa, Tawi-Tawi.
    - Sama Bangaw-Bangaw: near Sandakan on the northeast coast of Sabah
    - South Ubihan: South Ubian Island, east of the northeast end of Tawi-Tawi Island. Census figure of 27,000, including the population of Tandubas.
  - **Southern Sama**
    - Sibutuꞌ (Sama Sibutu): Sibutu Island, southwest of Bongao Island. About 10,000 speakers.
    - Simunul: Simunul Island, south of Bongao Island. 10,000 speakers. Also called sama səddopan.
    - Tandubas (Tanduꞌ-baas): Tandubas Island, just of the northeastern point of Tawi-Tawi Island. Census figure of 27,000, including the population of Tandubas. Also called aꞌa tanduꞌ-bās 'people of Tandu-Bas', aꞌa ungus matata 'people of Ungus Matata'. The Sama of central Sulu call them obian, ubian, sama sꞌddopan 'Southern Sama'.
    - Obian
    - Bongao
    - Sitangkai
    - Languyan
    - Sapa-Sapa
    - Sama Pahut: Bongao Island. About 1,000 speakers.
    - Sama Sampulnaꞌ: Semporna, east Sabah
    - Berau, East Kalimantan about 46,000 speakers.
- Mapun: 43,000 in the Philippines; 15,000 Mapun people in Sabah, Malaysia (2011 SIL)
  - Mapun is spoken on Cagayan de Sulu (Mapun) island, Tawi-Tawi, Philippines.
    - 20,000 in Mapun island
    - 5,000 to 10,000 Mapun people in Palawan
- **Bajau West Coast Sabah**
  - Kota Belud
  - Tuaran
  - Kudat
- **Bajau Indonesia**
  - Gorontalo Torosiaje, Popayato, Pohuwato

Sama–Bajaw dialects
Northern Sinama	Central Sinama	Southern Sinama	Sinama Pangutaran	Sinama Mapun	Bajau West Coast Sabah	Bajau Indonesia
Tagtabun Balangingiꞌ	Sama Kaulungan	Simunul	Pangutaran		Kota Belud	Torosiaje
Tonquil Balangingiꞌ	Sama Dilaut	Sibutuꞌ	Ubian (North)		Tuaran	
Linungan	Musuꞌ	Tandubas			Kudat	
Panigayan Balangingiꞌ	Laminusa	Sitangkai			Pitas	
Landang-Guaꞌ	Balimbing	Ubian (South)				
Sama Daongdong	Bannaran	Languyan				
Kawit Balangingiꞌ	Bangaw-Bangaw	Sapa-Sapa				
Karundung	Tabawan	Bongao/Sanga-Sanga/Pahut				
Pilas	Manubal	Berau East Kalimantan				
	Silumpak					
	Kabingaꞌan					

== Distribution ==
West Coast Bajau (Borneo Coast Bajau) is distributed in the following locations of Sabah, Malaysia (Ethnologue).

- scattered along the west coast from Papar district to Kudat district, mainly in Tuaran and Kota Belud towns
- Telutuꞌ village, Banggi Island, Kudat district
- Pitas district: along the west coast and Mengkubau Laut, Mengkapon, Dalimaꞌ, Mapan-Mapan, Pantai Laut, Layag-Layag, Mausar, Jambangan, Sibayan Laut, and Kanibungan villages

Indonesian Bajau is widely distributed throughout Sulawesi and Nusa Tenggara. It is also located throughout Maluku Utara Province in the Bacan Islands, Obi Islands, Kayoa, and Sula Islands, which are located to the southwest of Halmahera Island (Ethnologue).

Mapun is spoken on Cagayan de Sulu (Mapun) island, Tawi-Tawi, Philippines.

Ethnologue provides the following location information for various Sama languages.

Northern Sama is located in western Mindanao, the Sulu archipelago northeast of Jolo, Zamboanga coast peninsula and islands, and Basilan island.

- Northern Sama dialect: White Beach near Subic Bay, Luzon
- Lutangan dialect: Olutanga Island. Possibly also in Luzon and Palawan.

Central Sama is located in:

- Sulu and Tawi-Tawi provinces: Siasi, Tabawan, Bongao, Sitangkai, Cagayan de Sulu island
- Basilan Island: Maluso, Malamawi, Boheꞌ Lobbong
- Zamboanga del Sur Province: Rio Hondo, Campo Islam, Batuan Lumbayaw, Taluksangay, Sanggali
- Zamboanga del Norte Province: Olutanga, Sibuco
- Davao City: Isla Verde and Sasa
- Cagayan de Oro
- Cebu and Tagbilaran
- Puerto Princesa, Palawan
- Batangas

Southern Sama is located in Tawi-Tawi Island Province (in Tawi-Tawi, Simunul, Sibutu, and other major islands) and East Kalimantan (Berau)

Pangutaran Sama is spoken on Pangutaran Island, located to the west of Jolo; and in Cagayan de Tawi-Tawi, southern Palawan

Yakan is spoken in Basilan and small surrounding islands; Sakol island; and the eastern coast of Zamboanga. Yakan tends to be concentrated away from the coast.

Inabaknon is spoken on Capul Island, Northern Samar Province. Capul Island is located in the San Bernardino Strait, which separates Samar from the Bicol Peninsula of Luzon.

Bajau West Coast Sabah is spoken in Kota Belud, Kudat, and Tuaran which is on mutual intelligibility with Bajau East Coast of Sabah.

== Population ==
Ethnologue lists the following population statistics for Borneo Coast Bajau.

- West Coast Bajau: 55,000 in Sabah, Malaysia (2000 SIL)
- Indonesian Bajau: 150,000 in Indonesia (Mead et al. 2007)
  - 5,000 or more in North Maluku (Grimes 1982)
  - 8,000 to 10,000 in South Sulawesi (Grimes 1987)
  - 7,000 in North Sulawesi and Gorontalo
  - 36,000 in Central Sulawesi
  - 40,000 in Southeast Sulawesi (Mead et al. 2007)
  - several thousand in Nusa Tenggara (Wurm and Hattori 1981, Verheijen 1986)
- Mapun: 43,000 in the Philippines; 15,000 Mapun people in Sabah, Malaysia (2011 SIL)
  - 20,000 in Mapun island
  - 5,000 to 10,000 Mapun people in Palawan

== Grammar ==
=== Voice ===
Western Austronesian languages are characterised by symmetrical voice alternations. These differ from asymmetrical voice alternations, such as active and passive, since the voices can be considered equally transitive. Hence, the terms actor voice and undergoer voice are sometimes used.

- Actor voice (AV) refers to the construction in which the actor or agent-like argument is mapped to subject.
- Undergoer voice (UV) refers to the construction in which the undergoer or patient-like argument is mapped to subject.

The voice construction is signalled through morphological marking on the verb.

Western Austronesian languages are typically subdivided into Philippine-type and Indonesian-type languages on the basis of the voice system:

Philippine-type	Indonesian-type
Multiple Undergoer Voices that map different semantic roles to subject	Two symmetrical voices: Actor Voice and Undergoer Voice
AV has lower transitivity	True passive construction
Case marking of nominal arguments	Applicative suffixes

The voice alternations in Sama–Bajaw languages have some characteristics of Philippine-type languages and some characteristics of Indonesian-type languages.

Miller (2014) says that there are three main voice alternations in Sama-Bajaw:

- An AV construction marked with a nasal prefix.
- A transitive non-AV construction with the bare verb.
- Another non-AV construction with morphological marking on the verb and case marking on the agent.

In many Philippine languages, the UV construction is said to be basic. This has led people to analyse the languages as syntactically ergative. This analysis has been proposed for Sama Southern, Yakan, Sama Bangingiꞌ, and Sama Pangutaran. These languages are said to have Philippine-type voice systems.

West Coast Bajau, however, is said to have an Indonesian-type voice system because there are two transitive voices; a true passive construction (-in-) and an applicative suffix (-an). This makes West Coast Bajau more similar to the languages of Sarawak and Kalimantan than the other languages of Sabah.

Indonesian Bajau also has an Indonesian-type voice system as illustrated below:

ng-ita uggoꞌ aku
AV-see pig 1SG
'I saw the pig'

kita-ku uggo'
see-1SG pig
'I saw the pig'

di-kita-ku uggoꞌ
PASS-see-1SG pig
'The pig was seen by me'

ta-kita uggoꞌ ma aku
ACC.PASS-see pig OBL 1SG
'The pig was accidentally seen by me'

In some Sama–Bajau languages there are restrictions on how the non-AV actor is realised. For example, in Sama Bangingiꞌ the non-AV actor is typically a pronominal clitic in first or second person.

The voice alternations in Sama–Bajau languages can also be accompanied by a change in the case-marking of pronouns and a change in word-order.

=== Case marking ===
Sama–Bajau languages do not have case-marking on nominal arguments.

Nonetheless, pronouns have different forms depending on their grammatical function. Like the languages of Sarawak, West Coast Bajau has two different pronoun sets:

- Set 1: non-subject actors
- Set 2: all other pronouns

In contrast, most of the languages of Sabah have three sets of pronouns:

- Set 1: non-subject actors
- Set 2: subjects
- Set 3: non-subject, non-actors

In West Coast Bajau, the non-subject undergoer can be optionally realised using both the Set 1 and the Set 2 pronouns.

Zero anaphora is possible for highly topical arguments, except the UV actor, which cannot be deleted. This is common across Western Austronesian languages.

=== Word order ===
Like the languages of the Philippines, the Sama–Bajaw languages in the Sulu tend to be verb-initial. However, in most languages word order is flexible and depends on the voice construction. In the Sulu, SVO is only found in the context of preposed negatives and aspect markers. In West Coast Bajau, on the other hand, SVO word-order is also found in pragmatically neutral contexts. This, again, makes West Coast Bajau more similar to the languages of Sarawak than the other languages of the Sama-Bajaw group.

Verheijen (1986) suggests that the Bajau language spoken in the Lesser Sunda Islands has no fixed position of the subject but is fixed VO. The language has several properties that are said to correlate with VO word-order:

- Prepositions
- Noun‑Genitive
- Noun-Relative
- Noun-Adjective
- Noun-Demonstrative
- Preverbal negatives
- Initial subordinators

The preferred word-orders for five Sama–Bajau languages are shown below. The word order is represented in terms of the semantic roles: actor (A) and undergoer (U).

	AV word order	Zero UV word order	Affixed non-AV word order
Sama Bangingiꞌ	V A U		
Central Sama	V A U (if A = pronoun) V U A (if A = full noun)	V A U	V U A or V A U
Southern Sama	V A U (if A = pronoun) V U A (if A = full noun)	V A U	V U A (V A U also possible)
Pangutaran Sama	V A U	V A U	V A U or V U A
West Coast Bajau	A V U	V A U or U V A	U V A (less often V A U)

In all Sama–Bajau languages, the position of the actor is fixed, directly following the verb in the zero UV construction. Elsewhere, the order of actor and undergoer depends on the animacy of the arguments. This could be seen to follow the Philippine tendency to place actors first in the clause.

If we rephrase these orders in terms of grammatical function, a number of Sama–Bajau languages could be said to be VOS languages. S is equivalent to the actor in AV and the undergoer in UV. O is equivalent to the non-subject core argument.

==== Word order and information structure ====
Variant word-orders are permitted in Sama–Bajau languages. The different word-orders have different information structure interpretations. This differs depending on the voice of the clause.

Miller (2007) suggests that verb-initial order in West Coast Bajau UV clauses strongly correlates with foregrounding. He argues that this is the basic word order given that the undergoer in final position does not have a specific pragmatic status. In contrast, fronted undergoers are highly active and accessible. Both SVO and VOS orders occur with equal frequency in narrative texts, though VOS is highly preferred in foregrounded clauses.

AV clauses are predominantly subject-initial regardless of grounding. In fact, SVO is the only word-order permitted in subordinate clauses. Where verb-initial clauses in AV do occur, however, they typically represent key sequences of action in the storyline.

There are also specificity effects in AV verb-initial word order. VOS is acceptable when the non-subject undergoer is non-specific, but sometimes considered unacceptable if the undergoer is specific. The same is true for definite undergoers. However, the effects are not found when the word-order is VSO and the undergoer is in final position. In this case, the structure is grammatical regardless of whether the undergoer is definite/specific or not.

==== Topic and focus ====
In West Coast Bajau, it is possible for subjects, obliques and adjuncts to appear pre-verbally. Only non-subject arguments cannot appear in this position. Miller (2007: 193) suggests that there are two positions pre-verbally: topic and focus. Topic represents presupposed information whilst focus represents new information. In both AV and UV clauses, the preverbal subjects can be either topic or focus. Obliques, on the other hand, are always focus.

Consequently, Miller (2007: 211) analyses the clause structure of West Coast Bajau as follows:

Pragmatic structure of West Coast Bajau

FOCUS	TOPIC	PRED

The preverbal focus position can be followed by focus particles such as no.

== Phonology ==
=== Sinama ===
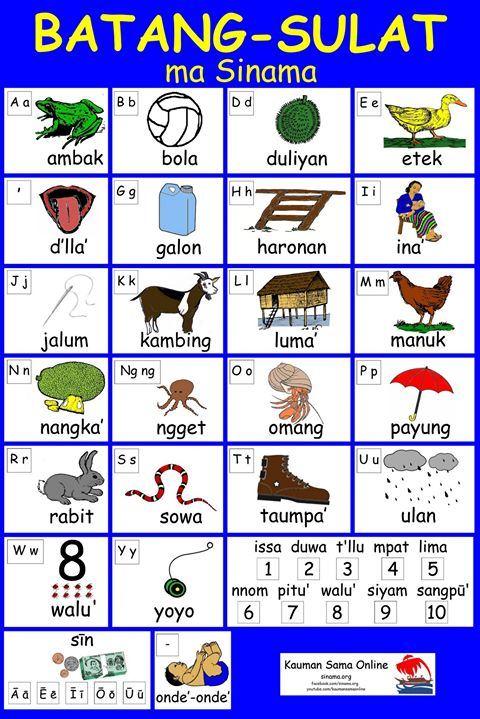
A reading poster for the Sinama language created by Kauman Sama Online for free use

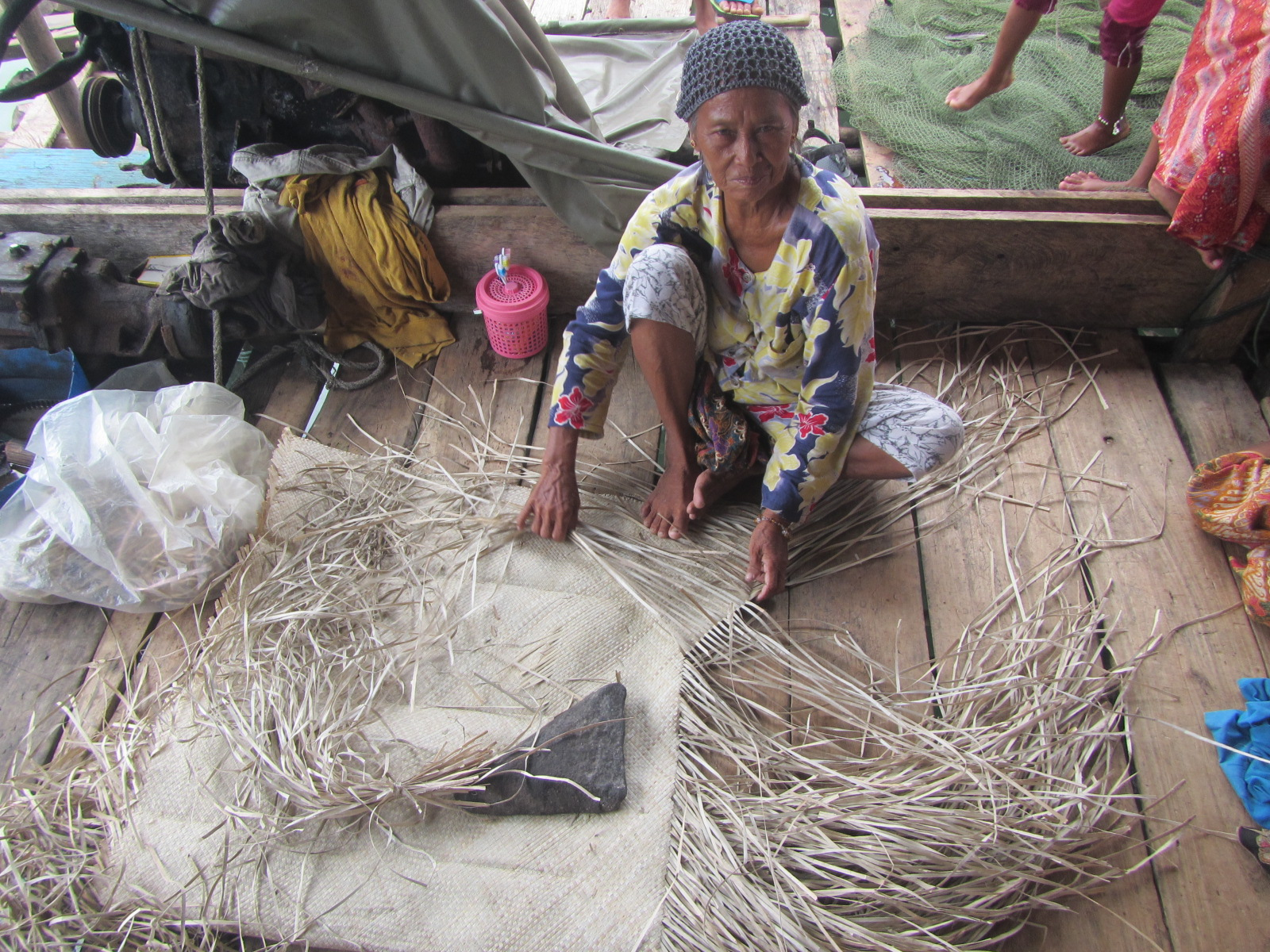
This woman making a traditional mat is a Sama from Siasi who now lives in Semporna, Malaysia.

Sinama languages have 21 to 24 phonemes. All Sinama languages have 17 consonants. Each language has from five to seven vowels.

==== Consonants ====
Consonants of Sibutu Sama
		Labial	Alveolar	Palatal	Velar	Glottal
Nasal		m	n	ɲ	ŋ	
Plosive/ Affricate	voiceless	p	t		k	ʔ
Plosive/ Affricate	voiced	b ~ β	d ~ ɾ	dʒ	ɡ ~ ɣ	
Fricative		b ~ β	s ~ ʃ		ɡ ~ ɣ	h
Approximant			l ~ ɭ	j	w	

The consonants of the Sinama languages are represented by the letters b, d, g, h, j, k, l, m, n, ng, p, r, s, t, w, y and ꞌ.

Representation of the glottal stop in Sinama has not yet reached a consensus among Sinama speakers. Linguists have suggested the use of an apostrophe-like character (⟨ꞌ⟩) for word final glottal stops. Central Sinama has adopted this for glottal stops in between vowels as well (i.e. aꞌa, the Sinama word for 'human'). Other Sinama languages have chosen to follow Tagalog orthography and to leave this vowel medial glottal stop ambiguous. Sinama speakers often spell the word final glottal stop with an h at the end. Sinama speakers in Malaysia may also spell it with a ⟨k⟩ following the vowel softening patterns of Bahasa Melayu.

In certain dialects of Sinama /b/ becomes [β] and /ɡ/ becomes [ɣ] when found between two vowels. Allophones of /d, s, l/ are heard as [ɾ, ʃ, ɭ].

==== Vowels ====
The vowels a, e, i, o, and u are found in all Sinama languages and dialects. In addition to these five vowels, ə and ɤ are found in one or more Sinama language.

	a	e	i	o	u	ə	ɤ
Northern	a	e	i	o	u		
Central	a	e	i	o	u	ꞌ	
Southern	a	e	i	o	u		
Pangutaran	a	e	i	o	u	ꞌ	ō
Jama Mapun	a	e	i	o	u		

Allophones of /i, e, a, o, u/ are heard as [ɪ, ɛ, ʌ, ɔ, ʊ].

Many of the Sinama languages have contrastive vowel lengthening. This is represented by a macron over the vowel (⟨ā ē ī ō ū⟩).

==== Stress ====
Sinama pronunciation is quite distinct from other nearby languages such as Tausug and Tagalog in that all of the Sinama languages primary stress occurs on the penultimate syllable of the word. Stress will remain on the penultimate syllable even with the addition of suffixes including enclitic pronouns. In Northern Sinama (Balanguingiꞌ) the stress will shift to the ultima when the penult is the mid central vowel /ə/.

==== Enclitic pronouns ====
The 1st, 2nd, and 3rd singular pronouns -ku, -nu and -na respectively, the 1st plural inclusive pronouns -ta and -tam, as well as the 2nd plural pronoun -bi are all enclitics. These enclitic pronouns change the pronunciation by shifting the stress of a word through the addition of a syllable; a verb or noun combined with a suffixed one syllable enclitic pronoun. Some Sinama orthographies represent this by writing both noun/verb and pronoun as one word e.g. lumaꞌta for 'our house' in Central Sinama. Other orthographies represent this with a hyphen e.g. lumaꞌ-ta for 'our house' in Southern Sinama. Still others write this keeping the noun/verb separate from the pronoun e.g. lumaꞌ ta for 'our house' in Northern Sinama.

=== West Coast Bajau ===
==== Consonants ====
The following are the sounds of West Coast Bajau:

		Labial	Alveolar	Palatal	Velar	Glottal
Nasal		m	n	ɲ	ŋ	
Plosive/ Affricate	voiceless	p	t		k	ʔ
Plosive/ Affricate	voiced	b	d	dʒ	ɡ	
Fricative			s			
Vibrant			r ~ ɾ			
Approximant			l ~ ɭ	j	w	

- Stop sounds /p t k/ when in word-final position are heard as unreleased [p̚ t̚ k̚], as is the case with the voiced stop sounds /b d ɡ/ as [b̚ d̚ ɡ̚].
- /l/ can be heard as a retroflex lateral [ɭ] in word-final position.
- /r/ can be heard as a flap [ɾ] when in intervocalic position.

==== Vowels ====
	Front	Central	Back
Close	i		u
Close-mid	e		o
Mid		ə	
Open		a	

The vowel sounds /i u e/ are heard as [ɪ ʊ ɛ] within closed syllables.

== Reconstruction ==
Proto-Sama-Bajaw is reconstructed in Pallesen (1985). Pallesen (1985) considers the homeland of Proto-Sama-Bajaw to be in the Basilan Strait area, around 800 AD.

== Cultural references ==
The lyrics of the song called Kiriring Pakiriring (popularly known as Dayang Dayang) were written in the Simunul dialect of the Southern Sinama language.

Central Sinama and Southern Sinama are two of six languages used in the 2012 Filipino drama film Thy Womb.

Sinama is featured on the 1991 edition of the Philippine one thousand peso bill. Langgal is written under a picture of a Sama place of worship. Langgal is the Sinama for that place of worship.

== Bibliography ==
- Blench, Roger. 2016. The linguistic background to SE Asian sea nomadism. In Sea nomads of SE Asia past and present. Bérénice Bellina, Roger M. Blench & Jean-Christophe Galipaud eds. Singapore: NUS Press.
- Pallesen, A. Kemp. 1985. Culture contact and language convergence. Philippine journal of linguistics: special monograph issue, 24. Manila: Linguistic Society of the Philippines.
- Mead, David; Lee, Myung-young (2007), Mapping Indonesian Bajau Communities in Sulawesi, SIL Electronic Survey Reports 2007-019, SIL International
- Miller, Mark Turner (2007). A Grammar of West Coast Bajau (Ph.D. thesis). University of Texas at Arlington. hdl:10106/577.
- Pallesen, A. Kemp. 1985. Culture contact and language convergence. Philippine journal of linguistics: special monograph issue, 24. Manila: Linguistic Society of the Philippines.
- Youngman, Scott (2005), Summary of Bajau Lexicostatistics Project (through October 1989), SIL International (word lists of 16 Indonesian Bajau varieties spoken in Sulawesi)
