= Sibuguey =

Pangutaran Sama dialect of the Philippines

- Batuan
- Native to: Some parts of Sibuguey Bay between Olutanga Island and the head of the bay
- Language family: Austronesian: Malayo-Polynesian; Sama-Bajaw; Sama; Pangutaran Sama language; Inner Sulu Sama Branch; Northern Sama; Sibuguey

Language codes
- ISO 639-3: –

Sibuguey is a dialect of Pangutaran Sama, a language spoken in the Philippines. It has 500 speakers.

It is spoken in Kulasihan River on the eastern side of Sibuguey Bay between Olutanga Island and the head of the bay.
