= Panguil Bay Bridge =

Longest bridge in Mindanao

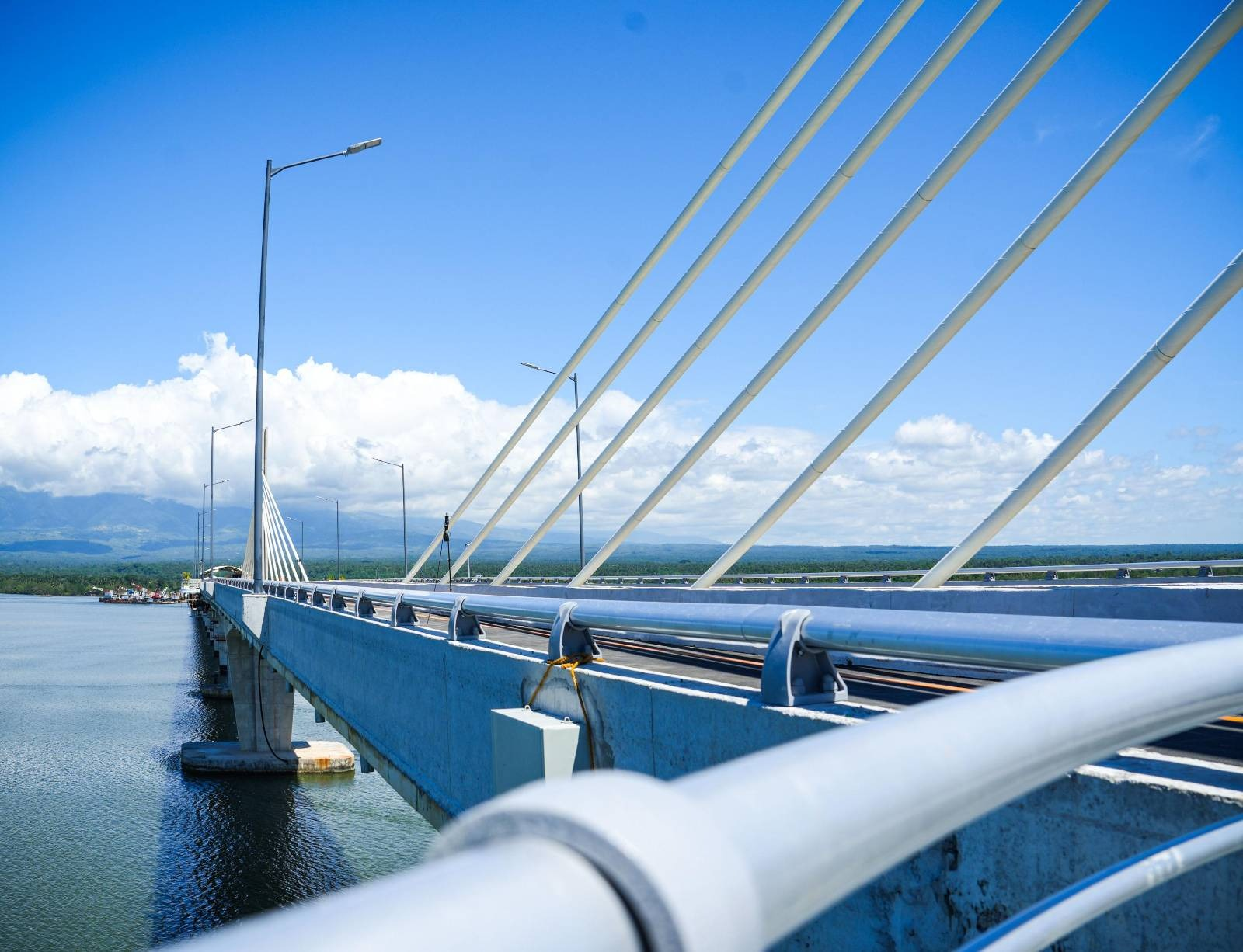
- Coordinates: 8°03′26″N 123°46′35″E
- Crosses: Panguil Bay
- Locale: Tubod, Lanao del Norte and Tangub, Misamis Occidental

Characteristics
- Total length: 3.77 km (2.34 mi)
- Longest span: 150 m (490 ft)

History
- Construction start: February 28, 2020
- Construction cost: ₱7.37 billion (2023 estimate)
- Opened: September 27, 2024
- Replaces: Ozamiz–Mukas ferry

Location
- Interactive map of Panguil Bay Bridge

The Panguil Bay Bridge is a 3.77 km (2.34 mi) extradosed bridge that crosses Panguil Bay. It connects Tangub in Misamis Occidental and Tubod in Lanao del Norte. It is currently the longest water-spanning bridge in Mindanao. It reduces the travel time between Tangub and Tubod from 2.5 hours to just a few minutes.

== History ==
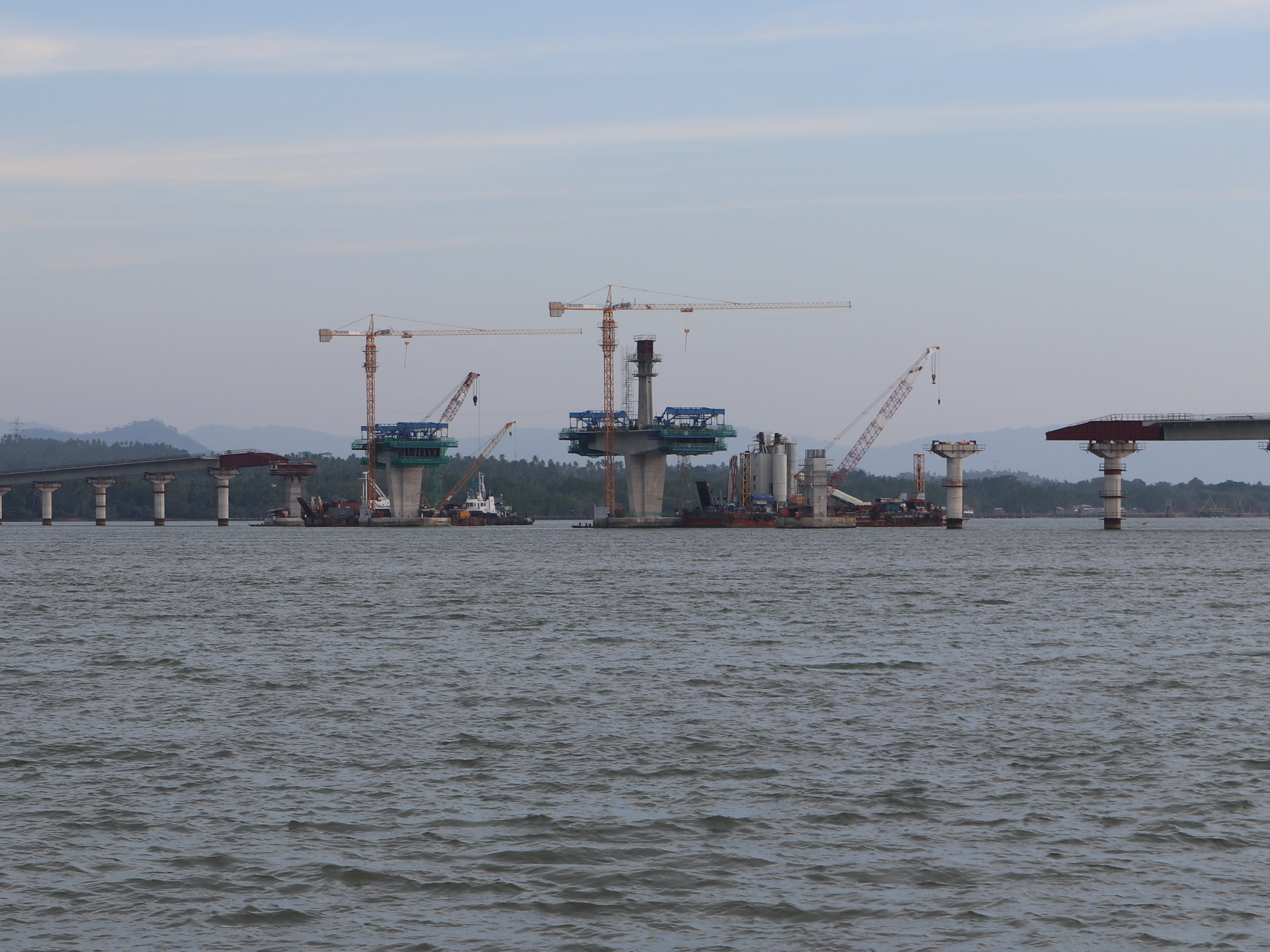
Bridge under construction in October 2023

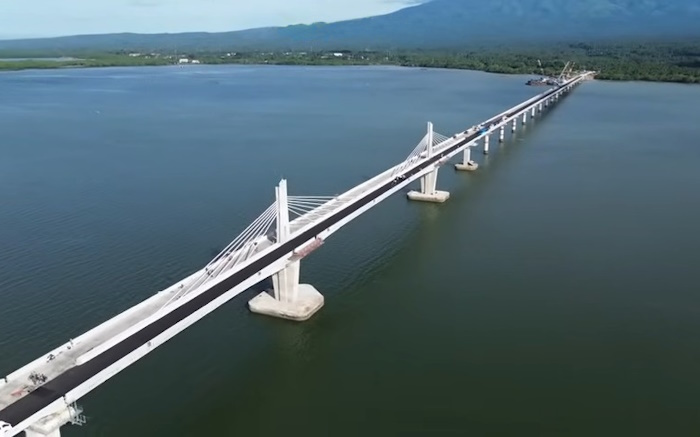
Aerial view of Panguil Bay Bridge nearing completion on September 4, 2024

Plans for a bridge in Panguil Bay had been planned as early as 1998, when a pre-feasibility study was conducted. Discussions on the Panguil Bay Bridge project began in 2014.

The National Economic and Development Authority (NEDA) Board approved the Panguil Bay Bridge Project in 2015, with the Department of Public Works and Highways designated as the implementing agency. A loan agreement between the Bureau of Treasury and the Export–Import Bank of Korea-Economic Development Cooperation Fund (KEXIM-EDCF) was signed on April 28, 2016. More than two years later, the groundbreaking ceremony for the bridge was held on November 27, 2018.

Construction officially began on 28 February 2020. As of May 2024, the project was 90% complete, with Imelda Dimaporo, governor of Lanao del Norte, announcing that the bridge would be opened to traffic by August. The final concrete pouring ceremony was held on July 4, 2024.

The bridge was party funded under the Korean Economic Development Cooperation Agreement. The bridge was designed and constructed by Korean contractor Namkwang Engineering & Construction Corporation in a joint venture with Kukdong Engineering & Construction Co. Ltd. and Gumgwang Construction Co. Ltd. The project management consulting was provided by Yooshin Engineering Corporation, in a joint venture with Pyunghwa Engineering Consultants Ltd. and Kyong-Ho Engineering & Architects Co. Ltd. Expenses not covered by the loan were funded by the Philippine national government.

On September 27, 2024, the 3.169 km (1.969 mi) ₱7.37 billion bridge was formally inaugurated and opened to traffic as the longest sea bridge in Mindanao.

== See also ==
- Guicam Bridge
- Davao–Samal Bridge
