= San Vicente, Northern Samar =

Municipality in Northern Samar, Philippines

San Vicente
- Municipality
- Municipality of San Vicente
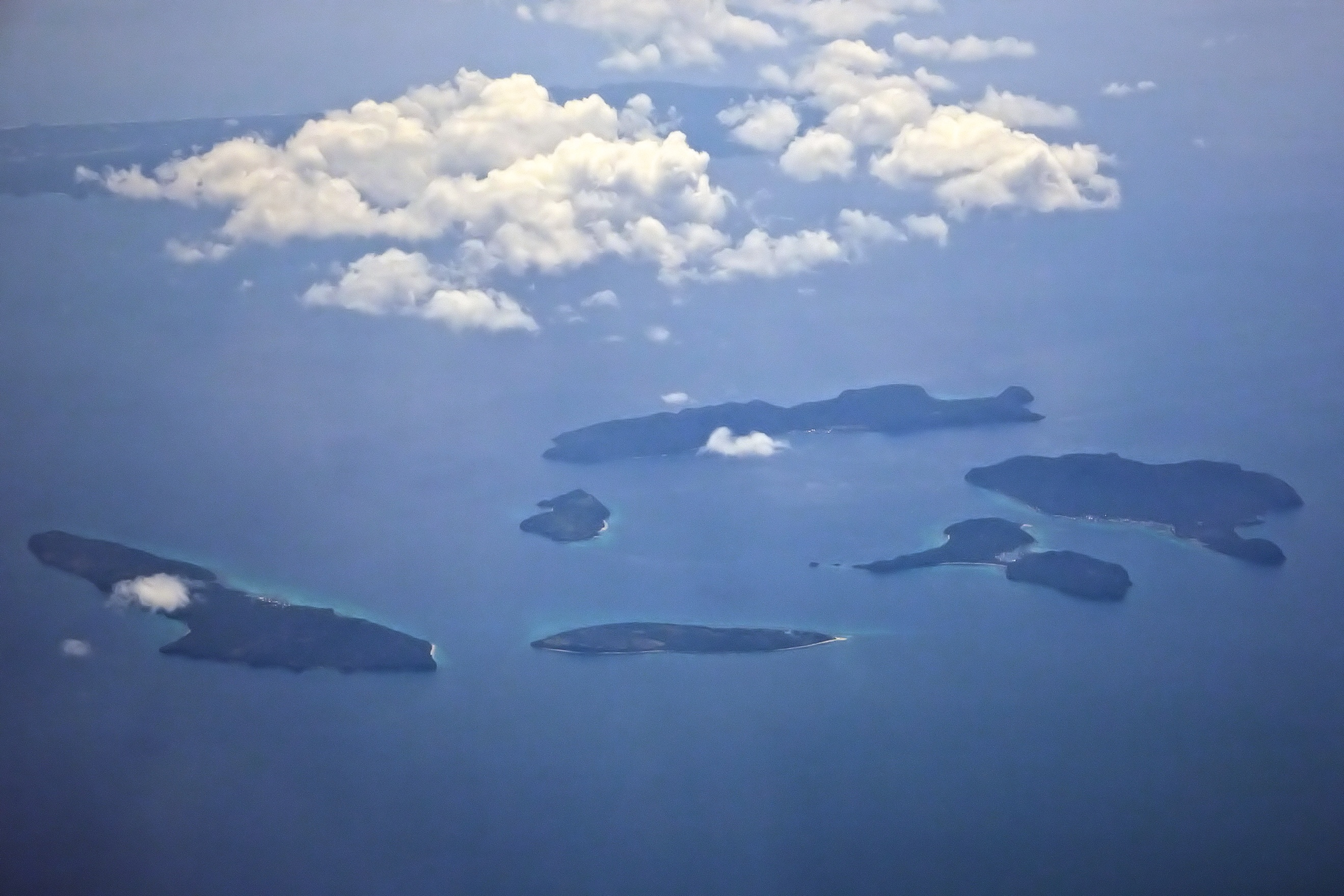
- Aerial view of the islands

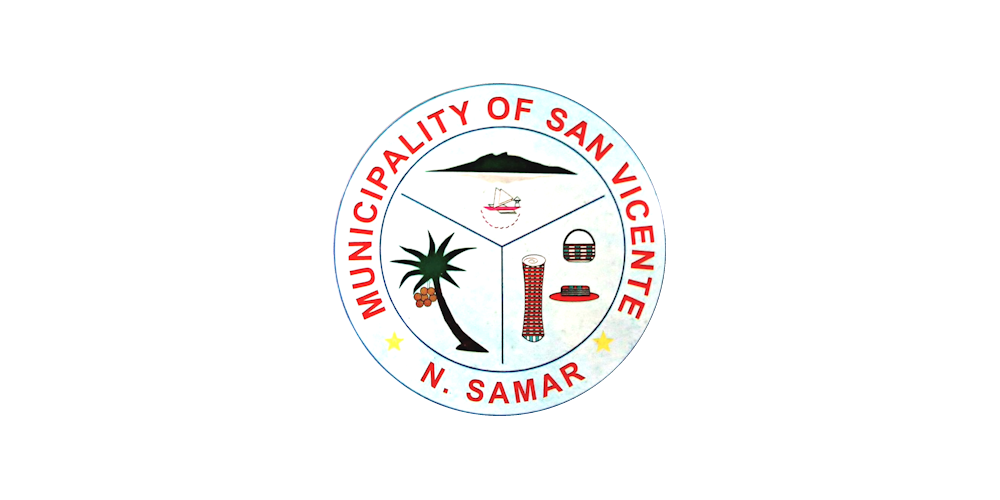
- Flag

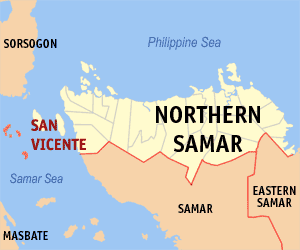
- Map of Northern Samar with San Vicente highlighted
- Interactive map of San Vicente
- Location within the Philippines
- Coordinates: 12°21′N 124°03′E
- Country: Philippines
- Region: Eastern Visayas
- Province: Northern Samar
- District: 1st district
- Founded: June 18, 1966
- Barangays: 7 (see Barangays)

Government
  - Type: Sangguniang Bayan
  - Mayor: Edgar T. Catarongan, Jr.
  - Vice Mayor: Tito M. Luñeza
  - Representative: Paul R. Daza
  - Councilors: List: • Victorio Q. Acebo; • Jornido E. Gabona; • Homer C. Trinidad; • Galicano L. Alig; • Samuel A. dela Cruz; • Val P. Gasid; • Rolito G. David; • Crispin G. Masdo; DILG Masterlist of Officials
  - Electorate: 6,087 voters (2025)

Area
  - Total: 15.8 km^{2} (6.1 sq mi)
- Elevation: 3.0 m (9.8 ft)
- Highest elevation: 206 m (676 ft)
- Lowest elevation: 0 m (0 ft)

Population (2024 census)
  - Total: 7,308
  - Density: 463/km^{2} (1,200/sq mi)
  - Households: 1,736

Economy
  - Income class: 5th municipal income class
  - Poverty incidence: 21.32% (2023)
  - Revenue: ₱ 71.07 million (2024)
  - Assets: ₱ 251.1 million (2024)
  - Expenditure: ₱ 58.67 million (2024)
  - Liabilities: ₱ 51.69 million (2024)

Service provider
  - Electricity: Northern Samar Electric Cooperative (NORSAMELCO)
- Time zone: UTC+8 (PST)
- ZIP code: 6419
- PSGC: 0804821000
- IDD : area code: +63 (0)55
- Native languages: Waray; Tagalog

San Vicente, officially the Municipality of San Vicente (Waray: Bungto han San Vicente; Cebuano: Lungsod sa San Vicente; Tagalog: Bayan ng San Vicente), is a municipality in the province of Northern Samar, Philippines.

It is an island-municipality composed of seven islands of the Naranjo Island Group: Sila, Tarnate, Sangputan, Panganoron (Medio), Mahaba (Rasa), Maragat (San Andres) and Destacado where the town proper is located. Destacado island is in the southernmost part of the group of islands comprising the municipality. It was established in 1966 out of the municipality of Capul.

Locals speak Cebuano language and part Waray-Waray. According to the 2024 census, it has a population of 7,308 people. It is the smallest municipality in the province, both in area and population.

== Geography ==
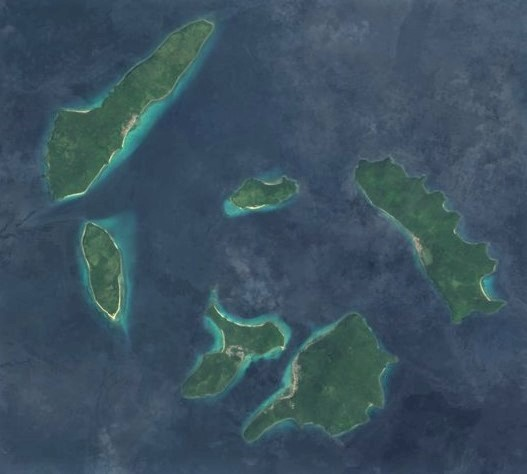
Naranjo Islands satellite image captured by Sentinel-2 in 2016

The island municipality of San Vicente consists of six major islands: Destacado, Panganoron, Mahaba, Maragat, Sila, Tarnate, and Sangputan. The islands of Panganoron, Mahaba, Maragat, Sila Tarnate and Sangputan form a circle of island group, while Destacado lies in the far south of the group. The seat of government and town center is located in Destacado Island, which is separated by several nautical miles from the rest of the group. Other smaller islands also form part of the municipality of San Vicente.

=== Barangays ===
San Vicente is politically subdivided into 7 barangays. Each barangay consists of puroks and some have sitios.

- Destacado Poblacion (Barangay 2)
- Maragat (Maragat Island)
- Mongol Bongol Poblacion (Barangay 1)
- Punta Poblacion (Barangay 3)
- Sangputan
- Sila (Sila Island)
- Tarnate

=== Climate ===
Climate data for San Vicente, Northern Samar
Month	Jan	Feb	Mar	Apr	May	Jun	Jul	Aug	Sep	Oct	Nov	Dec	Year
Mean daily maximum °C (°F)	29 (84)	29 (84)	31 (88)	32 (90)	32 (90)	32 (90)	31 (88)	31 (88)	30 (86)	29 (84)	29 (84)	29 (84)	30 (87)
Mean daily minimum °C (°F)	23 (73)	22 (72)	23 (73)	23 (73)	23 (73)	25 (77)	25 (77)	25 (77)	24 (75)	24 (75)	24 (75)	23 (73)	24 (74)
Average precipitation mm (inches)	39 (1.5)	34 (1.3)	42 (1.7)	36 (1.4)	73 (2.9)	109 (4.3)	118 (4.6)	108 (4.3)	129 (5.1)	165 (6.5)	112 (4.4)	89 (3.5)	1,054 (41.5)
Average rainy days	12.6	9.7	12	13	20.5	25.3	26.2	24.8	25.2	25.9	21.9	17.9	235
Source: Meteoblue

== Demographics ==
Population census of San Vicente
Year	Pop.	±% p.a.
1970	4,122	—
1975	4,184	+0.30%
1980	4,786	+2.72%
1990	5,777	+1.90%
1995	5,970	+0.62%
2000	5,831	−0.50%
2007	6,506	+1.52%
2010	7,447	+5.04%
2015	7,856	+1.02%
2020	6,928	−2.61%
2024	7,308	+1.29%
Source: Philippine Statistics Authority

== Economy ==
Poverty incidence of San Vicente (%)

Source: Philippine Statistics Authority

Since San Vicente is an island municipality, the primary source of income is fishing. Tourism is an untapped potential source of livelihood and jobs, but it is undeveloped. The islands of Sila, Tarnate, Sangputan, Panganoron, Maragat, and Mahaba boast of white sand beaches. At Sila island, a pink sand beach is tucked on its coast.
