= Abaknon language =

Austronesian language spoken in Southeast Asia

Abaknon
- Capul Sinama
- Inabaknon
- Region: Capul, Northern Samar, Eastern Visayas
- Native speakers: 26,000 (2010)
- Language family: Austronesian: Malayo-Polynesian; Sama–Bajaw; Abaknon
- Writing system: Latin

Language codes
- ISO 639-3: abx
- Glottolog: inab1237

The Inabaknon language, also known as Abaknon, Abaknon Sama, Capuleño, Kapul, or Capul Sinama, is an Austronesian language primarily spoken in the Island Municipality of Capul of Northern Samar, in the Eastern Visayas Region of the Philippines.

Unlike the other indigenous languages of the Eastern Visayas, namely Waray, Cebuano and Boholano, Inabaknon is not classified as part of the Visayan language family, but is rather grouped with the Sama–Bajaw languages.

== Background ==
Inabaknon is spoken on the island of Capul in the province of Northern Samar. According to oral folk history, due to their not liking the religion of the Moros who ruled over them, a group of people and their leader Abak fled Balabac. They sailed until reaching the island. The language is notable as being the only Sama language to not have had major Arabic influence via Islam.

== Phonology ==
Consonants
	Labial	Alveolar	Palatal	Velar	Glottal
Plosive/Affricate	p b	t d	(tʃ) dʒ	k g	ʔ
Fricative		s	(ʃ)		h
Nasal	m	n	(ɲ)	ŋ	
Approximant	w	l, r	j		

- The consonants in parentheses are only used in loanwords.

Vowels
	Front	Central	Back
High	i		u
Mid	(e)		(o)
Low		a	

- The mid vowels /e o/ are only found in loanwords.

== Vocabulary ==
Inabaknon wordlist (Jacobson, personal communication, 2007)
English	Inabaknon	Notes
hand	kambag / tamburo'	kambag: arm up to the forearm; tamburo': hand
left	kawiri	
right	kawanan	
leg/foot	kitid	
to walk	langngan	
road/path	lalan / tinampo	lalan: roadway; tinampo: feeder road
to come	da'ito / pada-	"come here"
to turn	arop	to veer
to swim	rangi	
dirty	rigsok	
dust	alpog	
skin	anit / panit	anit: animal skin; panit: vegetable skin
back	taludtod	
belly	battong	abdomen
bone	ta'ulang	
liver	atay	
breast	darakan	
shoulder	sugbong	
to know, be knowledgeable	alimagmag? / urup-urupan?	
to think	huna'-huna'	loanword; "to think, to ponder"
to fear	kuba-kuba / kulba	kuba-kuba: to palpitate; kulba: fear with worry
blood	laha'	
head	takulok	
neck	kallong	
hair	barahibo	
nose	urong	
to breathe	hingasong	
to sniff, smell	hingos / singo / baho	
mouth	bawa'	
tooth	impon	
tongue	dalla'	
to laugh	patatawa / turakhak	turakhak: belly laugh
to cry	bikho' / ngalngal	bikho': to sob; ngalngal: to cry loudly with tears
to vomit	uta'	
to spit	tupra / rukda'	tupra: vulgar; rukda': to expectorate
to eat	kabos / kakan	kabos: to eat voraciously; kakan: to dine
to chew	samsam	general term
to cook	sugna'	
to drink	tal'ok / inom	tal'ok: to drink alcohol
to bite	pang'it / pa'pa' / kibkib	kibkib: loanword
to suck	supsop	
ear	talinga	
to hear	kali / pakali	
eye	mata	
to see	kulaw? / bataw-bataw	kulaw: to check; bataw-bataw: to look randomly
to yawn	huyam	
to sleep	turi	
to lie down	libbak	
to dream	upi	
