= Capul =

Municipality in Northern Samar, Philippines

- Municipality
- Municipality of Capul
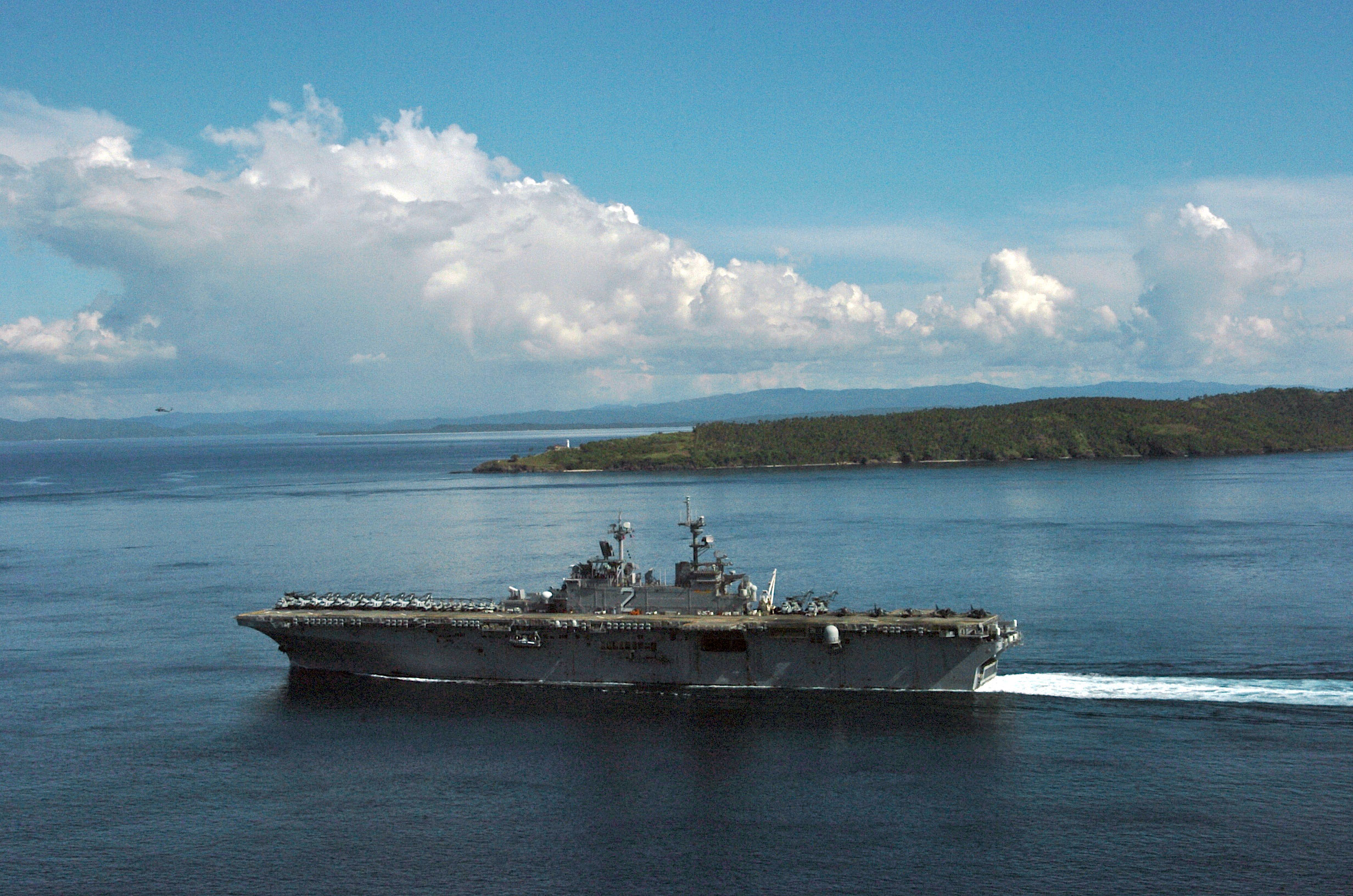
- USS Essex passes Capul Island while passing through the San Bernardino Strait

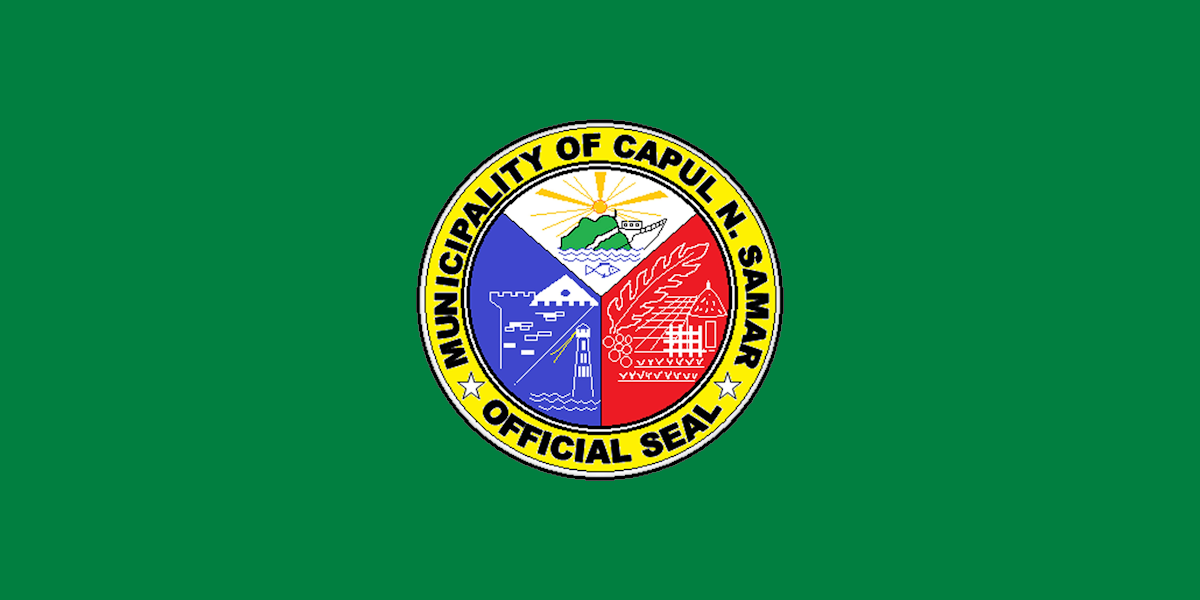
- Flag

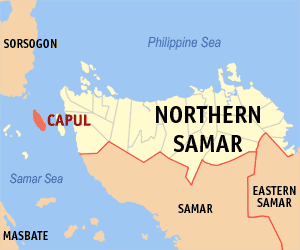
- Map of Northern Samar with Capul highlighted
- Interactive map of Capul
- Location within the Philippines
- Coordinates: 12°25′23″N 124°10′55″E
- Country: Philippines
- Region: Eastern Visayas
- Province: Northern Samar
- District: 1st district
- Named for: Acapulco, Mexico
- Barangays: 12 (see Barangays)

Government
  - Type: Sangguniang Bayan
  - Mayor: Isidro S. Bandal
  - Vice Mayor: Leonora F. Alfaro
  - Representative: Paul R. Daza
  - Councilors: Members: Danilo D. Ampuan; Asuncion C. Bonabon; Renato E. Pasco; Lito B. Cabacang; Ian B. Castillo; Julian G. Ortego Jr.; Mark Eric T. Magdaraog; Arnold C. Garrote
  - Electorate: 10,333 voters (2025)

Area
  - Total: 35.56 km^{2} (13.73 sq mi)
- Elevation: 73 m (240 ft)
- Highest elevation: 585 m (1,919 ft)
- Lowest elevation: 0 m (0 ft)

Population (2024 census)
  - Total: 12,127
  - Density: 341.0/km^{2} (883.3/sq mi)
  - Households: 2,712
- Demonym(s): Abaknon, Capuleño

Economy
  - Income class: 5th municipal income class
  - Poverty incidence: 24.17% (2023)
  - Revenue: ₱ 88.5 million (2024)
  - Assets: ₱ 228.2 million (2024)
  - Expenditure: ₱ 82.47 million (2024)
  - Liabilities: ₱ 32.34 million (2024)

Service provider
  - Electricity: Northern Samar Electric Cooperative (NORSAMELCO)
- Time zone: UTC+8 (PST)
- ZIP code: 6408
- PSGC: 0804804000
- IDD : area code: +63 (0)55
- Native languages: Abaknon; Waray; Tagalog
- Website: www.capul-nsamar.gov.ph

Capul, officially the Municipality of Capul (Inabaknon: Bungto si Capul; Waray: Bungto han Capul; Tagalog: Bayan ng Capul), is an island municipality in the province of Northern Samar, Philippines. According to the 2024 census, it has a population of 12,127 people.

The natives of Capul are known as the Abaknon or the Capuleño people. It is the only town in the province of Northern Samar with a distinct language, Inabaknon (also known as Capuleño, Abaknon Sama, or Capul Sinama), instead of Waray, the native language spoken by the locals of Samar island. Inabaknon is unique in it being only distantly related to the languages spoken in the entire Visayas and Luzon regions. Instead, it is classified by linguists as a Sama-Bajaw language.

A lighthouse was built on the island which served as a guidepost for the Acapulco-Manila galleon trade vessels passing through the treacherous waters of San Bernardino Strait. It also served as the capital of the former province of Samar from 1848 to 1852.

== Etymology ==
According to folklore, the name Capul is said to be derived from the word Acapulco, an old trading post in Mexico.

== History ==
According to oral folk history, the native Abaknon people of the island of Capul were originally from the island of Balabac, off the southern coast of Palawan. They were originally a Sama-Bajau group. In the 1300s, their island was annexed by the Sultanate of Sulu. The people who refused to submit to the Sultanate and convert to Islam fled Balabac under the leadership of a datu named Abak. They sailed northwards until reaching the island of Capul. Here, they established a settlement which they called Abak. By 1610, Spanish Jesuits arrived in the island and construction of the first church began around this period. The Inabaknon language of the Abaknon people are still classified by linguists as a Sama-Bajaw language, though the Abaknon people have converted to Christianity and have become culturally Visayan due to proximity with Visayan groups.

On June 18, 1966, barrios Mahaba, Maragat, Mongolbongol, Panganoron, Sila, Ternate, and Sang-putan were excised from Capul to form the new municipality of San Vicente.

== Geography ==
The municipality is contiguous with Capul Island, located at the southern entrance to the San Bernardino Strait.

=== Barangays ===
Capul is politically subdivided into 12 barangays. Each barangay consists of puroks and some have sitios.

- Aguin
- Jubang
- Landusan
- Oson
- Poblacion Barangay 1
- Poblacion Barangay 2
- Poblacion Barangay 3
- Poblacion Barangay 4
- Poblacion Barangay 5
- Sagaosawan
- San Luis
- Sawang

=== Climate ===
Climate data for Capul, Northern Samar
Month	Jan	Feb	Mar	Apr	May	Jun	Jul	Aug	Sep	Oct	Nov	Dec	Year
Mean daily maximum °C (°F)	27 (81)	28 (82)	29 (84)	30 (86)	31 (88)	30 (86)	29 (84)	29 (84)	29 (84)	29 (84)	29 (84)	28 (82)	29 (84)
Mean daily minimum °C (°F)	22 (72)	22 (72)	22 (72)	22 (72)	24 (75)	24 (75)	24 (75)	24 (75)	24 (75)	24 (75)	23 (73)	23 (73)	23 (74)
Average precipitation mm (inches)	84 (3.3)	59 (2.3)	58 (2.3)	55 (2.2)	93 (3.7)	133 (5.2)	149 (5.9)	125 (4.9)	155 (6.1)	165 (6.5)	140 (5.5)	136 (5.4)	1,352 (53.3)
Average rainy days	18.1	13.6	15.8	16.1	21.7	25.5	26.6	25.1	24.8	25.8	22.7	20.1	255.9
Source: Meteoblue (modeled/calculated data, not measured locally)

== Demographics ==
Population census of Capul
Year	Pop.	±% p.a.
1903	3,969	—
1918	4,257	+0.47%
1939	7,488	+2.73%
1948	9,257	+2.38%
1960	10,678	+1.20%
1970	8,648	−2.08%
1975	9,386	+1.66%
1980	10,237	+1.75%
1990	9,510	−0.73%
1995	9,964	+0.88%
2000	10,619	+1.37%
2007	11,289	+0.85%
2010	12,659	+4.26%
2015	12,679	+0.03%
2020	12,323	−0.60%
2024	12,127	−0.38%
Source: Philippine Statistics Authority

== Economy ==
Poverty incidence of Capul (%)

Source: Philippine Statistics Authority

=== Language ===
Capul has a different language from the rest of Northern Samar and the rest of Eastern Visayas. The native language in the island-municipality is Inabaknon. Inabaknon has been classified by linguists as a Sama-Bajaw language closely related to those found in Mindanao, rather than a Visayan language. Nonetheless, the Capul people can speak and understand the Waray language as it is spoken by the majority of the people in Northern Samar.

== Tourism ==
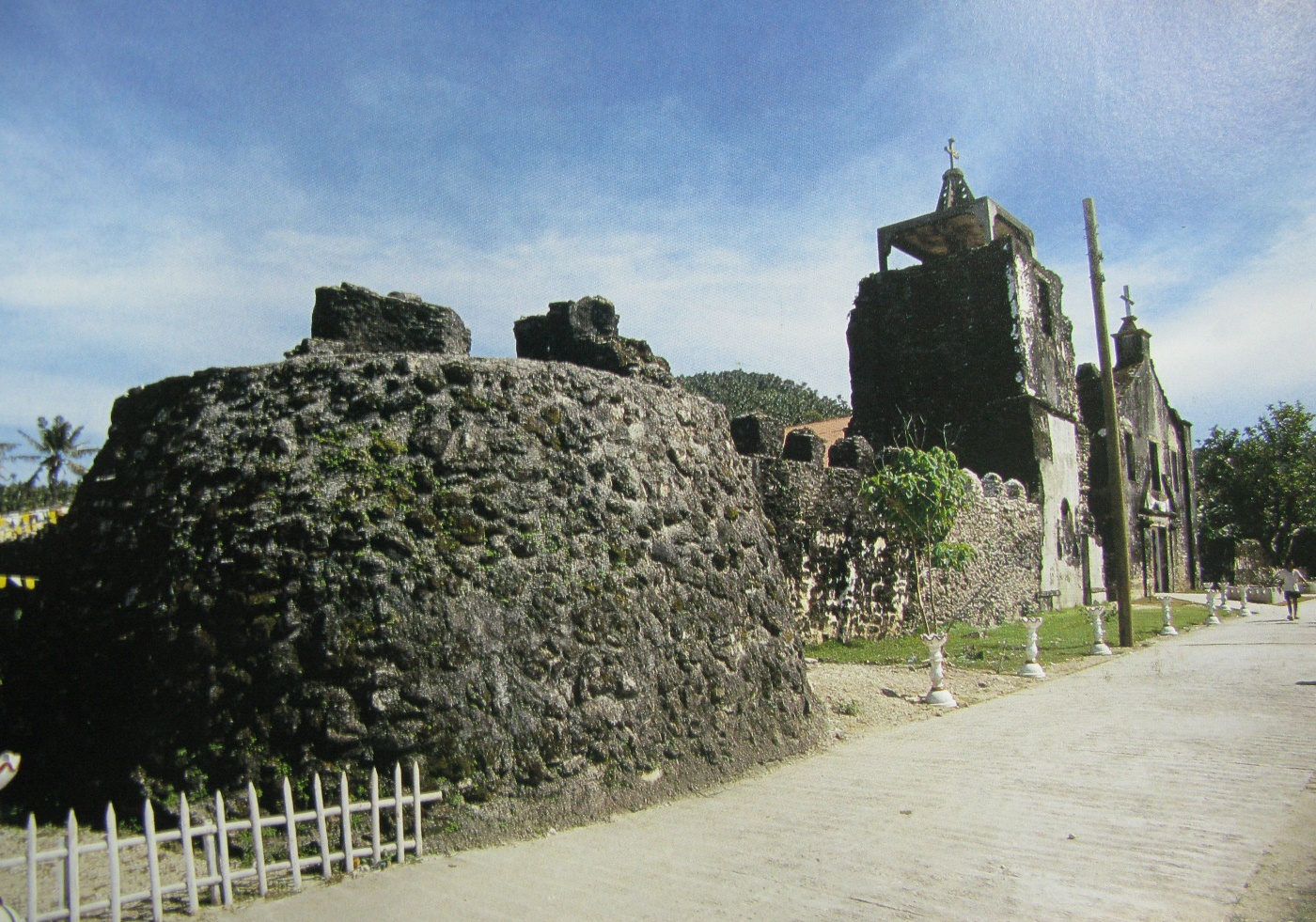
The Capul Church, the main church-fortification of Capul island and the capital of the central trading route of the historic Manila-Acapulco galleon trade route. The property, along with the entire municipality, is being pushed to become a UNESCO World Heritage Site.

Capul Church and Fortress

The Capul Church, built during the Spanish colonial period, is dedicated to St. Ignatius of Loyola and is surrounded by a square fort with bulwarks of dissimilar designs. The church structure was actually the third that was built on the site. The first two structures, made of hard wood and nipa roofs, were razed when Moro pirates plundered the island in 1615 and 1768. In 1781, Fr. Mariano Valero, a Spanish architect-priest led the restoration of the church and built the stonewall fortress similar to that in Intramuros, Manila that would fortify it against Moro attacks.

Capul Watchtower

Located on a hill near the Capul fort overlooking the town harbor, a stone watchtower was erected to serve as a sentry or warning system and a refuge for indigents during Moro raids.

Bitō Cave

Bitō Cave, also known as Beto Cave, is a popular natural attraction located in Sawang.

Timon-timon Rock

Timon-timon is a rudder-shaped rock formation located near the southern point of the island.

Capul Island Lighthouse
