= Medina College-Ipil =

Private college in Zamboanga Sibugay, Philippines

- Dalubhasaang Medina-Ipil (Filipino)
- Motto: The New and Bright Horizon in Modern Education
- Type: Private, non-sectarian higher education institution
- Established: June 2001
- Founders: Dr. Rico Macan Medina, Sr. Dr. Beatriz Crisostomo Medina
- Chairman: Rico M. Medina, Sr., M.D.
- President: Rico C. Medina Jr., MA, Ed.D.
- Location: Sagario St., Ipil, Zamboanga Sibugay, Philippines; 7°46′05″N 122°34′19″E
- Colors: Green and White
- Website: www.medinacollege-ipil.org
- Location in Mindanao Location in the Philippines

Medina College-Ipil is a private, non-sectarian higher education institution in Ipil, Zamboanga Sibugay. It was established by Dr. Rico Macan Medina, Sr. and his wife Dr. Beatriz Crisostomo Medina in June 2001, two years after its sister school in Pagadian was founded. The school offers Commission on Higher Education (CHED) recognized programs in Midwifery, Nursing, Pharmacy, Computer Science, Criminology, Elementary Education, Hotel and Restaurant Management.

The institution also offers Technical and Vocational Education and Training (TVET) programs under the Technical Education and Skills Development Authority (TESDA) and CHED.

== History ==
Medina College-Ipil was founded in June 2001, 38 years after Dr. Rico Macan Medina, Sr. and his wife Dr. Beatriz Crisostomo Medina founded the first Medina College in Ozamiz City (1963), the second in Sapang Dalaga (1983), and the third in Pagadian City (1999).
