= Sibuco-Vitali Sama =

Sama-Bajaw language of the Philippines

- Sibuku, Bitali, Nawan
- Region: Zamboanga Peninsula
- Ethnicity: Sibucoanon
- Native speakers: 11,000
- Language family: Austronesian: Malayo-Polynesian; Sama–Bajaw; Inner Sulu Sama; Balangingi; Sibuco-Vitali Sama

Language codes
- ISO 639-3: –
- Glottolog: sibu1254

Sibuco-Vitali Sama (Sibuku, Bitali, Nawan) is a variety of Inner Sulu Sama, a language spoken in the Philippines. It has approximately 11,000 speakers and is spoken in the Zamboanga Peninsula, 50 km north of Zamboanga City. Sibuco Sama people which borders a large population of Western Subanon, like the Western Subanon, both use the language of wider communication, namely Cebuano language.
