= Zamboanga Sibugay =

- Province
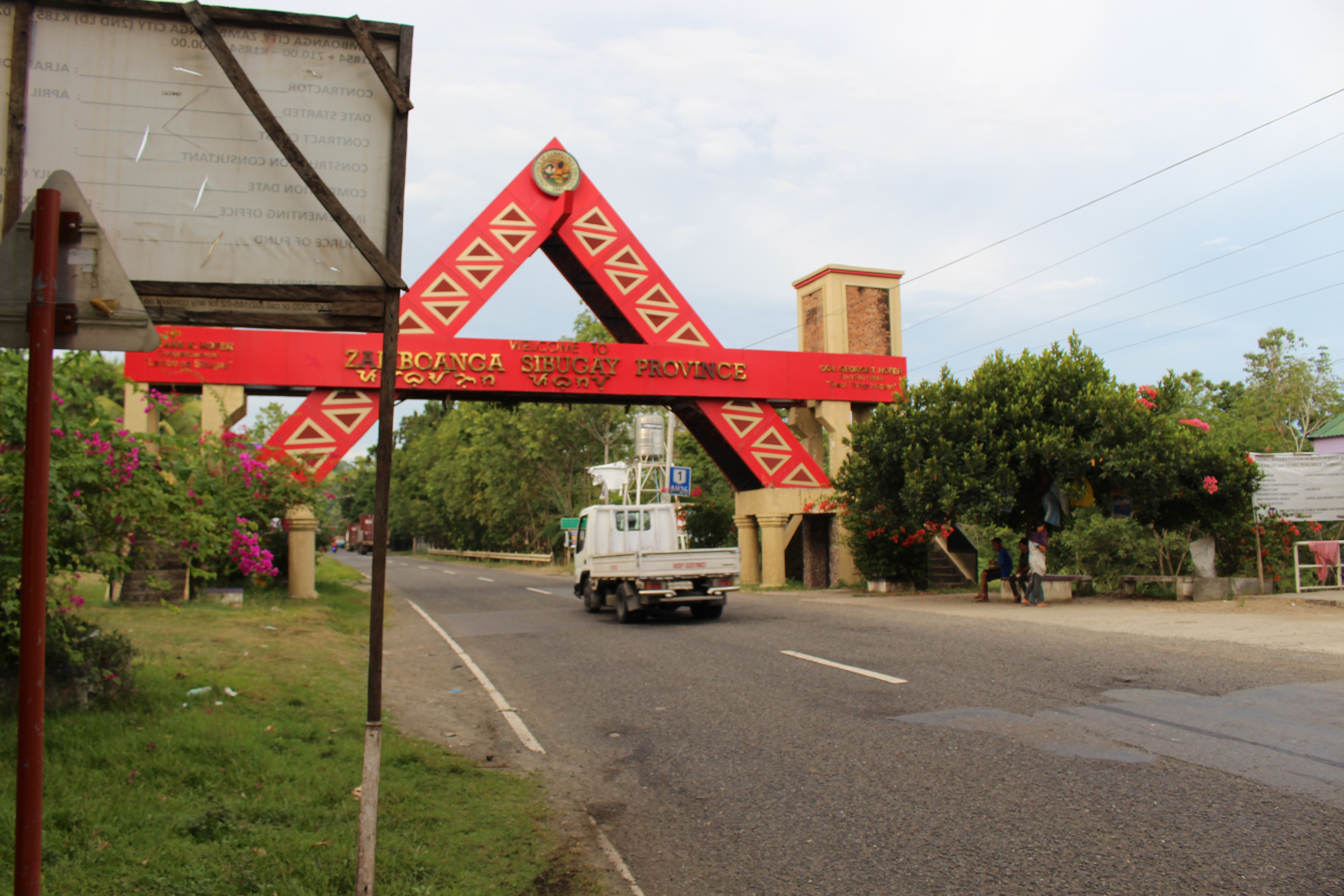
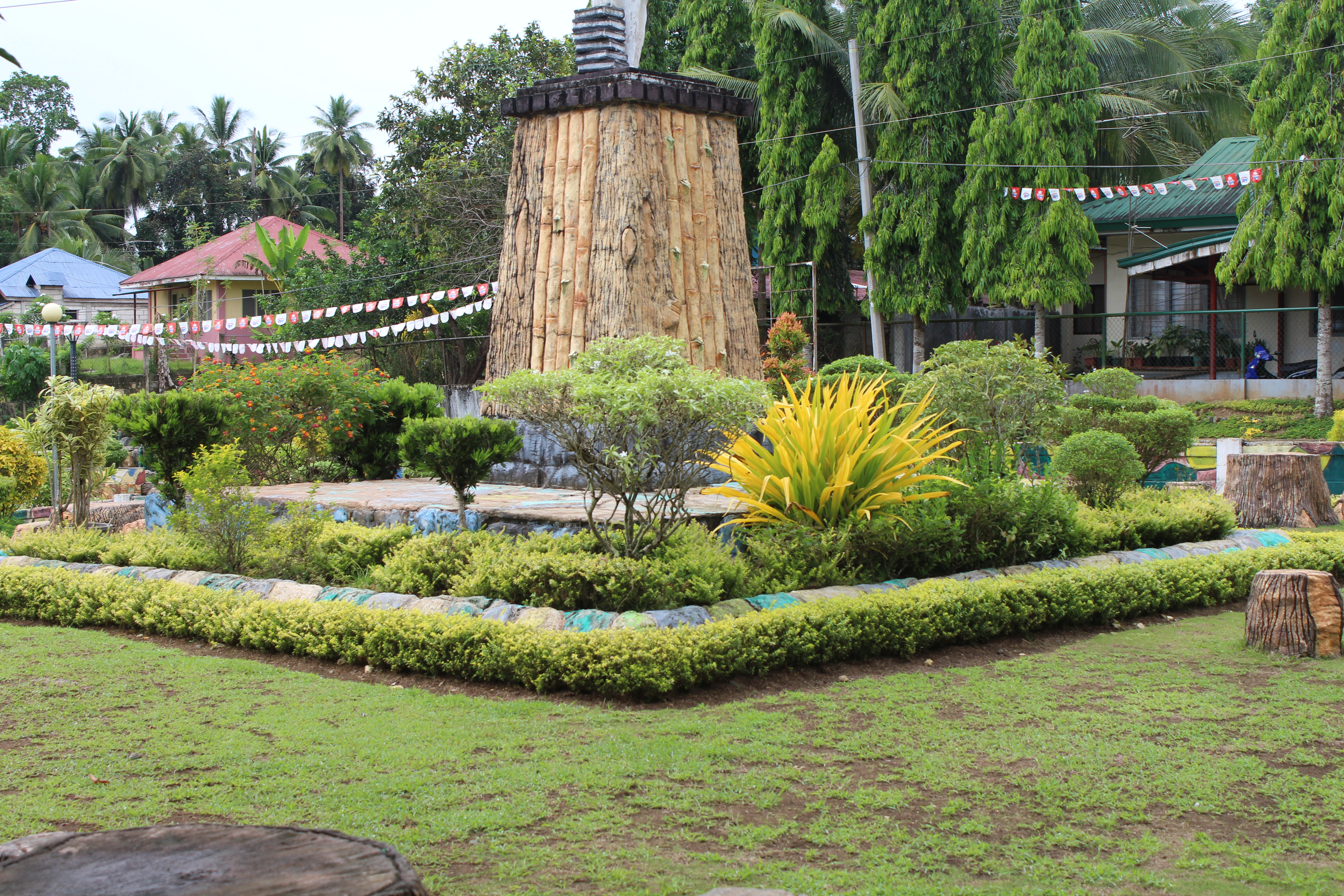
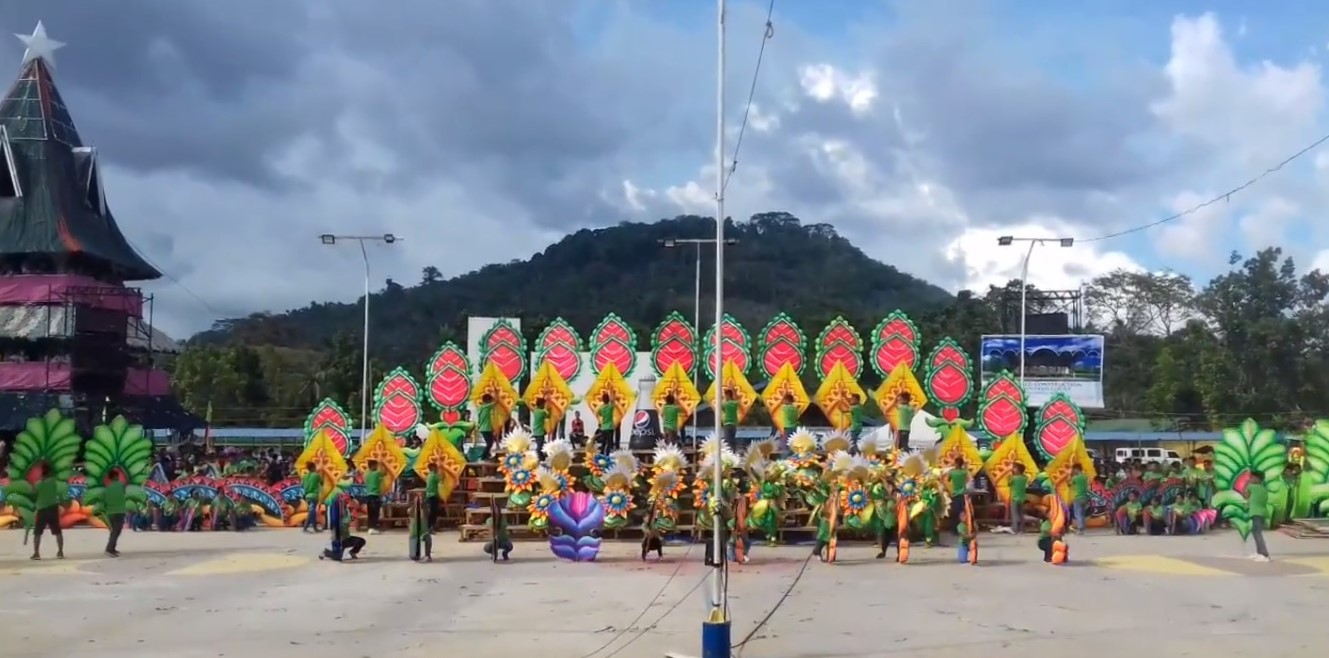
- (from top: left to right) Provincial Capitol in Ipil, Provincial Gateway Sign, Alicia, Zamboanga Sibugay, and the Bog Festival in Buug.

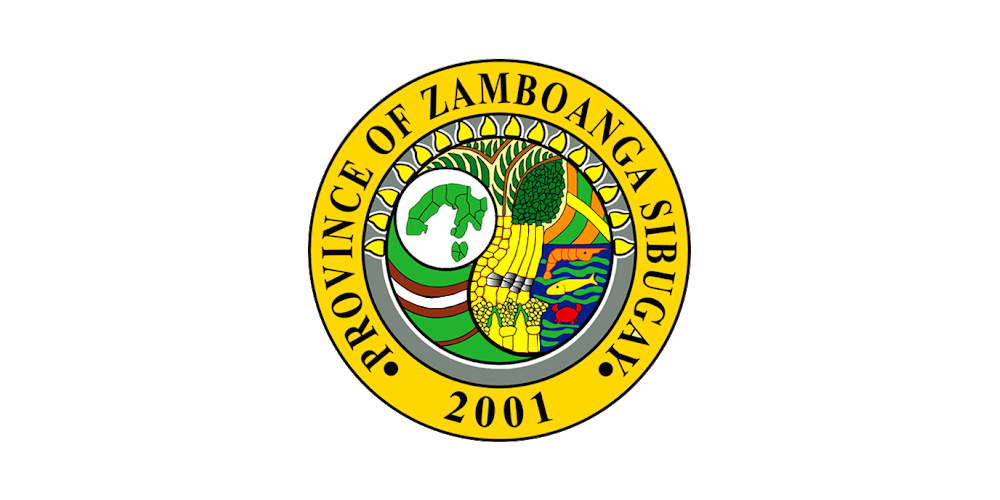
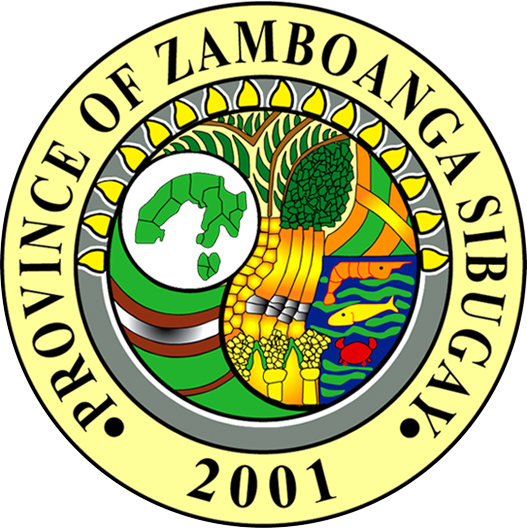
- Flag Seal

- Location in the Philippines
- Interactive map of Zamboanga Sibugay
- Coordinates: 7°48′N 122°40′E
- Country: Philippines
- Region: Zamboanga Peninsula
- Founded: 22 February 2001
- Capital and largest municipality: Ipil

Government
  - Type: Sangguniang Panlalawigan
  - Governor: Dulce Ann Hofer (PFP)
  - Vice Governor: Richard Dy Olegario (NP)
  - Legislature: Zamboanga Sibugay Provincial Board
  - Electorate: 428,422 voters (2025)

Area
  - Total: 3,607.75 km^{2} (1,392.96 sq mi)
  - Rank: 36th out of 82
- Highest elevation (Quipit Peak): 899 m (2,949 ft)

Population (2024 census)
  - Total: 661,498
  - Rank: 45th out of 82
  - Density: 183.355/km^{2} (474.887/sq mi)
  - Rank: 49th out of 82
  - Households: 154,669
- Demonym(s): Sibugaynon, Subanen

Divisions
  - Independent cities: 0
  - Component cities: 0
  - Municipalities: 16: Alicia; Buug; Diplahan; Imelda; Ipil; Kabasalan; Mabuhay; Malangas; Naga; Olutanga; Payao; Roseller Lim; Siay; Talusan; Titay; Tungawan
  - Barangays: 389
  - Districts: Legislative districts of Zamboanga Sibugay

Economy
  - Income class: 1st provincial income class
  - Poverty incidence: 17.8% (2023)
  - Revenue: ₱ 2,078 million (2024)
  - Assets: ₱ 7,364 million (2024)
  - Expenditure: ₱ 878.6 million (2024)
  - Liabilities: ₱ 1,013 million (2024)
- Time zone: UTC+8 (PHT)
- PSGC: 098300000
- IDD : area code: +63 (0)62
- ISO 3166 code: PH-ZSI
- Spoken languages: Cebuano; Subanon; Maguindanaon; Tausug; Filipino; English
- Website: sibugay.gov.ph

Zamboanga Sibugay, officially the Province of Zamboanga Sibugay (Cebuano: Lalawigan sa Zamboanga Sibugay; Filipino: Lalawigan ng Zamboanga Sibugay), is a province in the Philippines located in the Zamboanga Peninsula region in Mindanao. Its capital and largest town is Ipil and it borders Zamboanga del Norte to the north, Zamboanga del Sur to the east and Zamboanga City to the southwest. To the south lies Sibuguey Bay in the Moro Gulf.

Zamboanga Sibugay is the 79th province created in the Philippines, when its territories were carved out from the third district of Zamboanga del Sur in 2001.

== History ==
Historical affiliations

Spain 1521–1898
United States of America 1898–1942
Japan 1942–1945
United States of America 1945–1946
Philippines 1946–present

The earliest recorded mention of Sibugay was in Historia de las islas de Mindanao, Jolo y sus adyacentes (1667) by the Spanish priest Francisco Combés, which describes the village of "Sibuguey" along the river Sibuguey.

Zamboanga Sibugay was formerly part of Zamboanga del Sur. Attempts to divide Zamboanga del Sur into two separate provinces date as far back as the 1960s. Several bills were filed in the Philippine Congress, but remained unacted.

It started in the 1960s when several bills were filed in Congress such as House Bill No. 17574 by the late Rep. Vincenzo Sagun, HB No. 8546 of Congresswoman Belma Cabilao, HB No. 341 through Congressman Vicente M. Cerilles and the Batasan Parliamentary Bill sponsored by parliament members (Antonio Ceniza, Manuel M. Espaldon, Hussien Loong, Kalbi Tupay, and Minister Romulo Espaldon). All of these bills were relegated to the recesses of the archives.

In 1993, the Zamboanga Occidental Movement ushered in a renewed political consciousness among the people of the 3rd district of Zamboanga del Sur. The movement was so intense that a People's Initiative was conducted simultaneously with the May 12, 1997 Barangay and Sangguniang Kabataan elections. In this exercise, the majority of the voters signed in favor of forming a new province. It was then that Representative George T. Hofer sponsored House Bill No. 1311. He managed to push the bill in Congress and gave it a new identity by naming the proposed province as Zamboanga Sibugay. He lobbied for its approval in the Senate and the new province was finally created by Republic Act No. 8973 signed into law by President Joseph Estrada on November 7, 2000. On February 22, 2001, Republic Act No. 8973 was ratified through a plebiscite conducted in 44 municipalities of Zamboanga del Sur and Pagadian City. Zamboanga del Sur Third District Representative George Hofer was appointed and later elected as its first governor in 2001.

== Government ==
Presently, former representative Dr. Dulce Ann K. Hofer is the governor of the province, while former Sangguniang Panlalawigan member, Richard Olegario serves as her Vice Governor. Furthermore, the House Representatives of the first and second districts are Atty. Marlo Bancoro and Doc. Marly Hofer-Hasim, respectively.

== Geography ==
Zamboanga Sibugay covers a total area of 3,607.75 square kilometres (1,392.96 sq mi) occupying the south-central section of the Zamboanga Peninsula in western Mindanao, at 7°48’N 122°40’E.

To the north it intersects the common municipal boundaries of Kalawit, Tampilisan, and Godod of Zamboanga del Norte. It is bordered to the west by the municipalities of Sirawai, Siocon, and Baliguian, to the south by the Sibuguey Bay, and to the east by the municipalities of Bayog and Kumalarang of Zamboanga del Sur. It is further bordered on the southwest by Zamboanga City.

=== Climate ===
The climate of the province is moderately normal (climate type III). Annual rainfall varies from 1,599 to 3,500 millimetres (63.0 to 137.8 in). Temperature is relatively warm and constant throughout the year ranging from 22 to 35 °C (72 to 95 °F). The province is situated outside the country's typhoon belt.

=== Administrative divisions ===
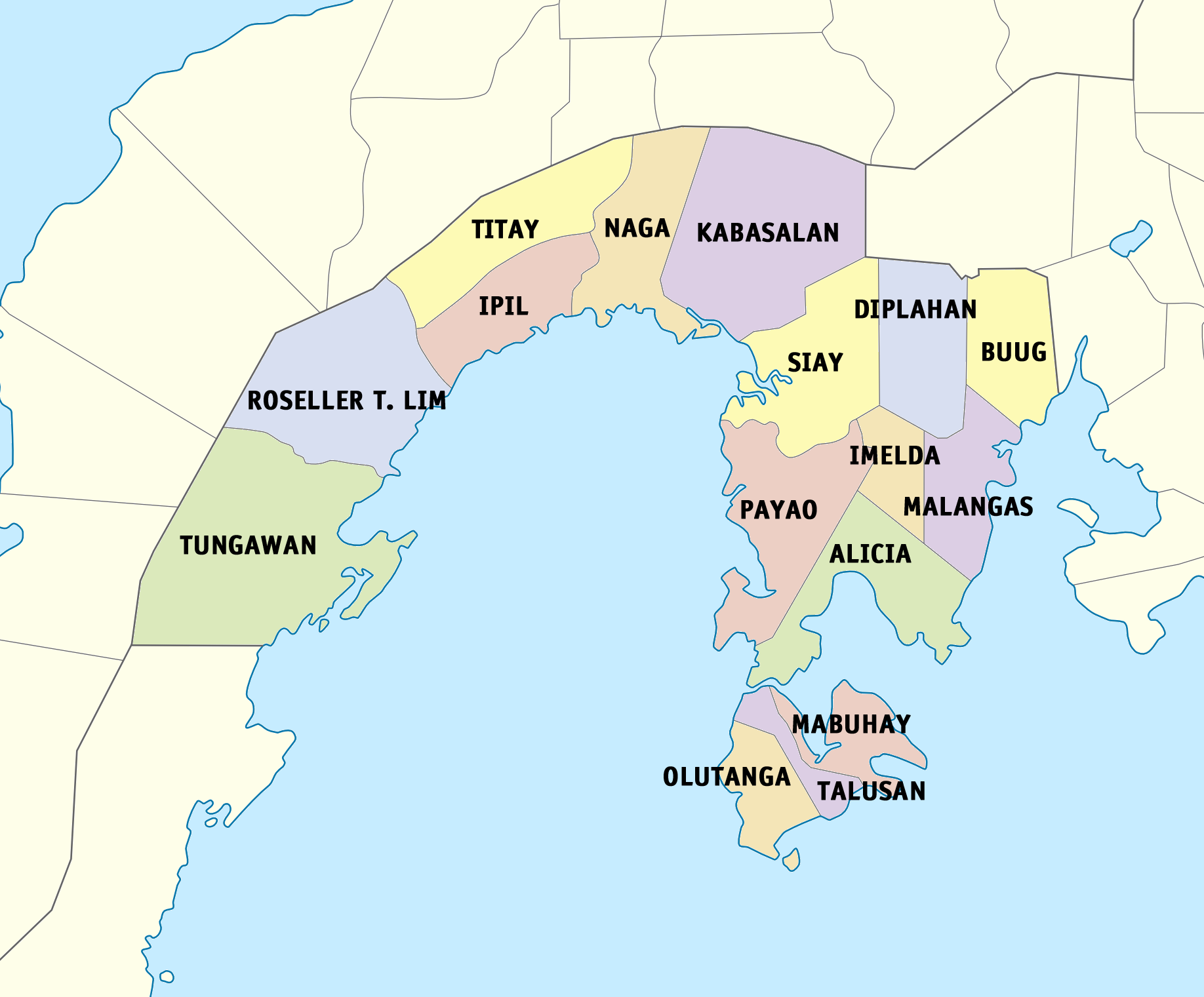
Administrative divisions

Zamboanga Sibugay comprises 16 municipalities, organized into two congressional districts and further subdivided into 389 barangays.

- † Provincial capital

| Municipality | | District | Population | | | ±% p.a. | Area | | Density | | Barangay | Coordinates^{[A]} |
| | | | (2020) | | (2015) | | km^{2} | sq mi | /km^{2} | /sq mi | | |
|---|---|---|---|---|---|---|---|---|---|---|---|---|
| Alicia | | 1st | 5.9% | 39,456 | 36,013 | +1.75% | 183.08 | 70.69 | 220 | 570 | 27 | 7°30′18″N 122°56′29″E |
| Buug | | 1st | 5.7% | 38,425 | 36,634 | +0.91% | 134.06 | 51.76 | 290 | 750 | 27 | 7°43′22″N 123°03′28″E |
| Diplahan | | 1st | 4.9% | 32,585 | 32,428 | +0.09% | 255.51 | 98.65 | 130 | 340 | 22 | 7°41′30″N 122°59′07″E |
| Imelda | | 1st | 3.9% | 26,020 | 28,018 | −1.40% | 85.12 | 32.87 | 310 | 800 | 18 | 7°38′32″N 122°56′03″E |
| Ipil ^ | † | 2nd | 13.3% | 89,401 | 74,656 | +3.49% | 241.60 | 93.28 | 370 | 960 | 28 | 7°46′57″N 122°35′13″E |
| Kabasalan | | 2nd | 7.0% | 46,884 | 44,336 | +1.07% | 289.20 | 111.66 | 160 | 410 | 29 | 7°47′51″N 122°45′43″E |
| Mabuhay | | 1st | 5.6% | 37,390 | 36,870 | +0.27% | 82.85 | 31.99 | 450 | 1,200 | 18 | 7°25′03″N 122°50′10″E |
| Malangas | | 1st | 4.8% | 32,022 | 33,380 | −0.79% | 235.53 | 90.94 | 140 | 360 | 25 | 7°37′45″N 123°01′50″E |
| Naga | | 2nd | 6.2% | 41,743 | 38,547 | +1.53% | 246.30 | 95.10 | 170 | 440 | 23 | 7°47′18″N 122°41′43″E |
| Olutanga | | 1st | 5.7% | 38,438 | 33,671 | +2.55% | 113.30 | 43.75 | 340 | 880 | 19 | 7°18′30″N 122°50′42″E |
| Payao | | 1st | 5.2% | 34,952 | 31,686 | +1.89% | 245.66 | 94.85 | 140 | 360 | 29 | 7°35′09″N 122°48′08″E |
| Roseller Lim | | 2nd | 6.5% | 43,575 | 43,646 | −0.03% | 300.00 | 115.83 | 150 | 390 | 26 | 7°39′31″N 122°27′59″E |
| Siay | | 2nd | 6.1% | 40,585 | 41,572 | −0.46% | 313.66 | 121.10 | 130 | 340 | 29 | 7°42′22″N 122°51′51″E |
| Talusan | | 1st | 4.2% | 27,873 | 29,969 | −1.37% | 58.16 | 22.46 | 480 | 1,200 | 14 | 7°25′36″N 122°48′37″E |
| Titay | | 2nd | 8.1% | 53,994 | 49,673 | +1.60% | 350.44 | 135.31 | 150 | 390 | 30 | 7°52′04″N 122°33′38″E |
| Tungawan | | 2nd | 6.9% | 46,497 | 42,030 | +1.94% | 473.28 | 182.73 | 98 | 250 | 25 | 7°36′05″N 122°25′34″E |
| Total | | | | 669,840 | 633,129 | +1.08% | 3,481.28 | 1,344.13 | 190 | 490 | 389 | (see GeoGroup box) |
1. Coordinates mark the town center, and are sortable by latitude.

NOTE: Municipality with caret symbol (^) marks the province's largest settlement.

== Demographics ==
Population census of Zamboanga Sibugay
| Year | Pop. | ±% p.a. |
|---|---|---|
| 1918 | 9,843 | — |
| 1939 | 15,882 | +2.30% |
| 1948 | 19,037 | +2.03% |
| 1960 | 110,085 | +15.74% |
| 1970 | 236,005 | +7.91% |
| 1975 | 252,916 | +1.40% |
| 1980 | 278,762 | +1.96% |
| 1990 | 407,038 | +3.86% |
| 1995 | 450,340 | +1.91% |
| 2000 | 497,239 | +2.15% |
| 2007 | 546,186 | +1.30% |
| 2010 | 584,685 | +2.51% |
| 2015 | 633,129 | +1.53% |
| 2020 | 669,840 | +1.19% |
| 2024 | 661,498 | −0.30% |
Source: Philippine Statistics Authority

The population of Zamboanga Sibugay in the 2024 census was 661,498 people, with a density of 180 inhabitants per square kilometre or 470 inhabitants per square mile.

The vast majority of the people of Zamboanga Sibugay speak Cebuano and Chavacano. Other languages such as Subanen, Ilocano, Maguindanaon and Tausug, among others, are also spoken, followed by English and Filipino.

=== Religion ===
The province is predominantly Christian. Roman Catholics are the predominant Christians comprising 60.29% of the population. Various sectarian groups are also present such as Baptists, Born-again Christians, Jehovah's Witnesses, Church of Christ of Latter Day Saints, Iglesia ni Cristo, and Seventh-Day Adventist. Islam comprises about 15.94% of the population.

== Economy ==
Poverty incidence of Zamboanga Sibugay (%)

Source: Philippine Statistics Authority

The leading industries are in the areas of semi-processed rubber, rice and corn milling, ordinary food processing, wood and rattan furniture making, dried fish and squid processing, and home-made food processing. New industries include concrete products, garments, wax and candle factories, lime making, and other home and cottage industries.

Major crops produced include rice, corn, coconuts, rubber, fruit trees, vegetables, tobacco, coffee, cacao, and root crops. Livestock and poultry productions are predominantly small-scale and backyard operations. Coal mining in large and small scale and precious metal mining in small scale category are likewise present in some areas of the province.

== Tourism ==
- Rotunda Obelisk
- Provincial Capitol
- Buluan Island

== Education ==
Public and private schools include:

- St. Paul School of Buug
- Dr. Aurelio Mendoza Memorial Colleges (Dr. AMMC)
- Marcelo Spinola School (MSS)
- Marian College (MC)
- Sibugay Technical Institute, Inc. (STII)
- Universidad de Zamboanga (UZ)
- Mindanao State University–Zamboanga Sibugay (MSU-ZS)
- Saint John College Buug (SJC)
- Medina College-Ipil (MC)
- Sibugay Technical Institute, Inc. Imelda Branch (STII)
- Western Mindanao State University (External Studies Unit (ESU)) in the following: Alicia, Diplahan, Imelda, Ipil, Mabuhay, Naga, Olutanga, Siay, Tungawan

== Notable people ==
- Marlo Bancoro - lawyer, incumbent representative of Zamboanga Sibugay's 1st congressional district since 2025, former member of the Zamboanga Sibugay Provincial Board (2022-2025).
- George T. Hofer (1938-2019) - physician, former mayor of Titay (1992 - 1998); former Representative of the 3rd legislative district of Zamboanga del Sur (1998-2001); and first Governor of Zamboanga Sibugay (2001 - 2010).
- Sylvester Lopez - boxer.
- Dhan Ryan Alar Bayot (1992-2017) - soldier and Marawi siege hero.
