= Mabuhay, Zamboanga Sibugay =

Municipality in Zamboanga Sibugay, Philippines

Mabuhay
- Municipality
- Municipality of Mabuhay
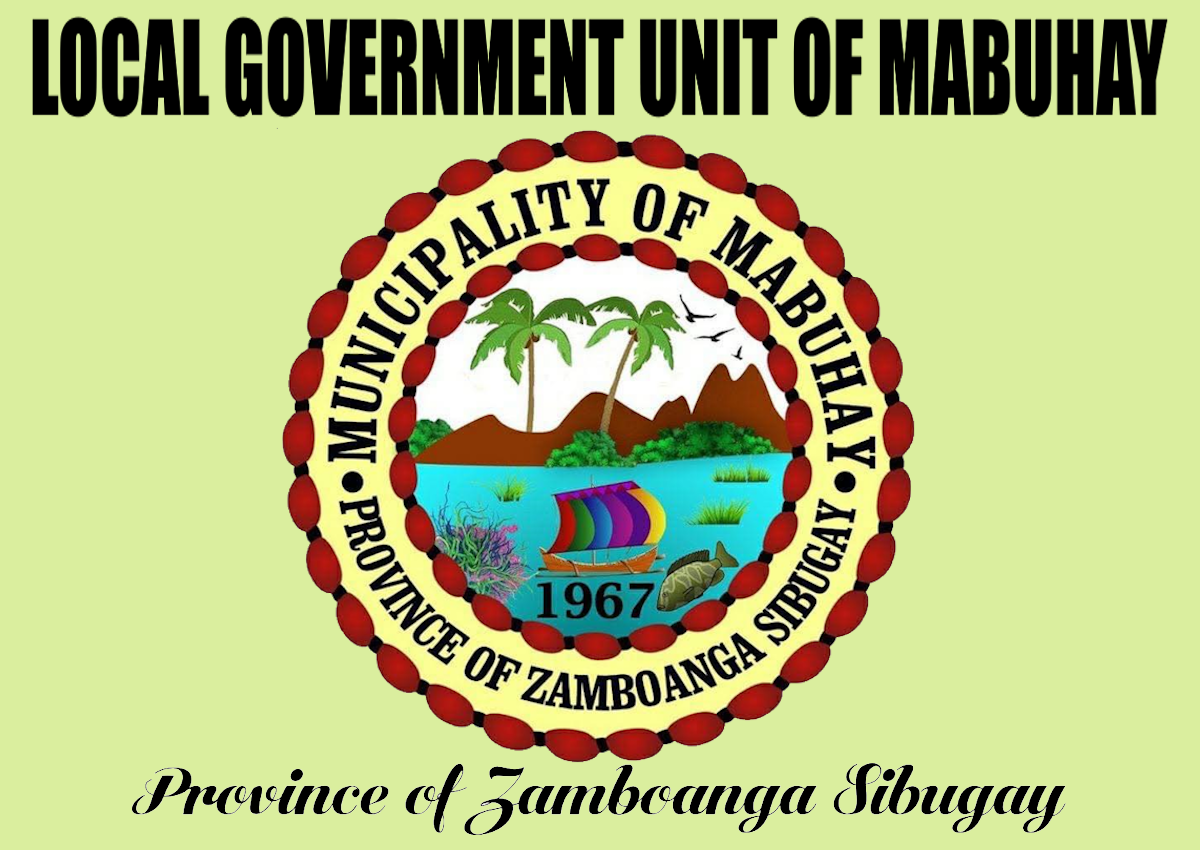
- Flag Seal
- Etymology: Mabuhay
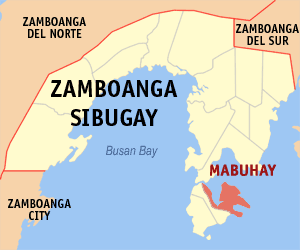
- Map of Zamboanga Sibugay with Mabuhay highlighted
- Interactive map of Mabuhay
- Location within the Philippines
- Coordinates: 7°25′03″N 122°50′13″E
- Country: Philippines
- Region: Zamboanga Peninsula
- Province: Zamboanga Sibugay
- District: 1st district
- Barangays: 18 (see Barangays)

Government
  - Type: Sangguniang Bayan
  - Mayor: Edreluisa O. Caloñge
  - Vice Mayor: Joval John B. Samonte
  - Representative: Marlo Bancoro
  - Municipal Council: Members: Maria Pilar T. Adlaon; Majin V. Andak Sr.; Alvarez H. Dammang; Nelson L. Mallen; Baltazar A. Alcala Sr.; Jermalyn M. Dammang; Abubakhar S. Anjawang
  - Electorate: 15,819 voters (2025)

Area
  - Total: 82.85 km^{2} (31.99 sq mi)
- Elevation: 8.0 m (26.2 ft)
- Highest elevation: 48 m (157 ft)
- Lowest elevation: −3 m (−9.8 ft)

Population (2024 census)
  - Total: 24,296
  - Density: 293.3/km^{2} (759.5/sq mi)
  - Households: 7,497

Economy
  - Income class: 3rd municipal income class
  - Poverty incidence: 29.17% (2023)
  - Revenue: ₱ 168.2 million (2024)
  - Assets: ₱ 560.8 million (2024)
  - Expenditure: ₱ 53.41 million (2024)
  - Liabilities: ₱ 139.1 million (2024)

Service provider
  - Electricity: Zamboanga del Sur 2 Electric Cooperative (ZAMSURECO 2)
- Time zone: UTC+8 (PST)
- ZIP code: 7010
- PSGC: 0908307000
- IDD : area code: +63 (0)62
- Native languages: Subanon; Cebuano; Chavacano; Tagalog
- Website: www.mabuhaysibugay.gov.ph

Mabuhay, officially the Municipality of Mabuhay (Cebuano: Lungsod sa Mabuhay; Chavacano: Municipalidad de Mabuhay; Tagalog: Bayan ng Mabuhay), is a municipality in the province of Zamboanga Sibugay, Philippines. According to the 2024 census, it has a population of 24,296 people.

The municipality is located in the northeastern part of Olutanga Island.

== Geography ==
=== Barangays ===
Mabuhay is politically subdivided into 18 barangays. Each barangay consists of puroks while some have sitios.

- Abunda
- Bagong Silang (Tumalog)
- Bangkaw-bangkaw
- Caliran (Turko)
- Catipan
- Kauswagan
- Ligaya
- Looc-Barlac
- Malinao (Sagasa)
- Pamansaan
- Pinalim (San Roque)
- Poblacion (Mabuhay)
- Punawan
- Santo Niño (Tobi-an)
- Sawa
- Sioton
- Taguisian
- Tandu-Comot (Katipunan)

=== Climate ===
Climate data for Mabuhay, Zamboanga Sibugay
Month	Jan	Feb	Mar	Apr	May	Jun	Jul	Aug	Sep	Oct	Nov	Dec	Year
Mean daily maximum °C (°F)	31 (88)	31 (88)	31 (88)	31 (88)	30 (86)	29 (84)	29 (84)	29 (84)	29 (84)	29 (84)	30 (86)	30 (86)	30 (86)
Mean daily minimum °C (°F)	23 (73)	23 (73)	23 (73)	24 (75)	25 (77)	25 (77)	24 (75)	24 (75)	24 (75)	24 (75)	24 (75)	23 (73)	24 (75)
Average precipitation mm (inches)	61 (2.4)	55 (2.2)	75 (3.0)	81 (3.2)	145 (5.7)	189 (7.4)	189 (7.4)	197 (7.8)	162 (6.4)	181 (7.1)	115 (4.5)	70 (2.8)	1,520 (59.9)
Average rainy days	16.4	15.7	19.1	21.5	26.9	27.1	26.4	25.0	24.2	26.8	23.5	18.7	271.3
Source: Meteoblue

== Demographics ==
Population census of Mabuhay
Year	Pop.	±% p.a.
1970	13,349	—
1975	21,562	+10.09%
1980	9,141	−15.77%
1990	13,292	+3.82%
1995	19,512	+7.46%
2000	25,199	+5.64%
2007	30,589	+2.71%
2010	33,093	+2.90%
2015	36,870	+2.08%
2020	37,390	+0.30%
2024	24,296	−9.83%
Source: Philippine Statistics Authority

== Economy ==
Poverty incidence of Mabuhay (%)

Source: Philippine Statistics Authority

== Government ==
=== Elected officials ===
Mabuhay Municipal Council (2025 - 2028)
Position	Name	Party
Congressman	Marlo Bancoro	PFP
Mayor	Endrelusia "Indaylou" O. Caloñge	NP
Vice Mayor	Joval John B. Samonte	NP
Councilors	Dario S. Alforque	NP
Councilors	Anam H. Dammang	Lakas
Councilors	Majin V. Andak	NP
Councilors	Alvin D. Hassan	NP
Councilors	Rey T. Omamalin	NP
Councilors	Julhisan "Isan" H. Buhali	NP
Councilors	Abubakhar "Bhong" S. Anjawang	Lakas
Councilors	Maria Pilar T. Adlaon	Lakas
