= Pangutaran Sama language =

Austronesian language spoken in Philippines

Pangutaran Sama
- Siyama
- Native to: Philippines
- Region: Pangutaran Island (Sulu Islands) and surrounding areas
- Ethnicity: Sama
- Native speakers: (35,000 cited 2000)
- Language family: Austronesian: Malayo-Polynesian; Sama–Bajaw; Pangutaran Sama

Language codes
- ISO 639-3: slm
- Glottolog: pang1291

Pangutaran Sama, also known as Siyama, is an Austronesian language spoken in the Sulu Archipelago of the Philippines. The language belongs to the Malayo-Polynesian branch of the Austronesian languages.

== Classification ==
Pangutaran Sama is classified by Karl Alexander Adelaar as a Sama-Bajaw languages, one of the groups of Western Malayo-Polynesian.
