= Pangutaran =

Municipality in Sulu, Philippines

Pangutaran فَڠُتَرَنْ Pulau Bangkuruan (Malay) Puh Pangutaran (Siyama)
- Municipality
- Municipality of Pangutaran
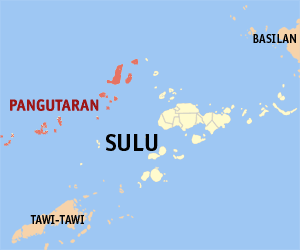
- Map of Sulu with Pangutaran highlighted
- Interactive map of Pangutaran
- Location within the Philippines
- Coordinates: 6°18′N 120°35′E
- Country: Philippines
- Region: Zamboanga Peninsula
- Province: Sulu
- District: 1st district
- Named for: Shariff Pangutaran
- Barangays: 16 (see Barangays)

Government
  - Type: Sangguniang Bayan
  - Mayor: Asri S. Taib
  - Vice Mayor: Alradzmin A. Nanoh
  - Representative: Samier A. Tan
  - Municipal Council: Members: Adzmer A. Hassan; Omar J. Samomoh; Jimmy A. Basari; Radzma M. Ebni; Faizal T. Jainal; Kiyong T. Kuyong; Sain K. Haiyon; Abdurajik M. Abdulmajid
  - Electorate: 19,150 voters (2025)

Area
  - Total: 258.10 km^{2} (99.65 sq mi)
- Elevation: 1.0 m (3.3 ft)
- Highest elevation: 565 m (1,854 ft)
- Lowest elevation: 0 m (0 ft)

Population (2024 census)
  - Total: 41,575
  - Density: 161.08/km^{2} (417.20/sq mi)
  - Households: 6,592
- Demonym: Siyama Al-Pangutaran or Siyamal

Economy
  - Income class: 2nd municipal income class
  - Poverty incidence: 15.5% (2023)
  - Revenue: ₱ 218.6 million (2022)
  - Assets: ₱ 424.9 million (2022)
  - Expenditure: ₱ 191.7 million (2022)
  - Liabilities: ₱ 236 million (2022)

Service provider
  - Electricity: Sulu Electric Cooperative (SULECO)
- Time zone: UTC+8 (PST)
- ZIP code: 7414
- PSGC: 1906608000
- IDD : area code: +63 (0)68
- Native languages: Pangutaran Sama; Tausug; Tagalog

Municipality of Pangutaran municipal hall entrance in Pangutaran, Sulu, Philippines.

Pangutaran, officially the Municipality of Pangutaran (Tausūg: Kawman sin Pangutaran; Pangutaran Sama: Lahat Pangutaran; Filipino: Bayan ng Pangutaran), is a municipality in the province of Sulu, Philippines. According to the 2024 census, it has a population of 41,575 people.

== Geography ==
Pangutaran is part of an island group in the Sulu Archipelago. In his 1908 work The History of Sulu, Najeeb M. Saleeby described the Pangutaran Group as lying west of the main Sulu Group and north of the sixth parallel. He identified Pangutaran, Pandukan, North Ubian, Laparan, and Tababas or Cap among the principal islands of the group.

== History ==
One of the early published accounts mentioning Pangutaran dates to the eighteenth century. During his voyage through the Sulu Archipelago in November 1774, British navigator Thomas Forrest recorded visiting an island he called "Pangatarran". Forrest wrote that he sighted the island on November 15 and anchored near an old ruined fort. The following day, he encountered inhabitants of the island and people from Sulu. He described Pangatarran as a long, flat island where coconuts and guavas grew. Forrest's visit to Pangatarran in November 1774 has also been discussed in a University of California study of his voyage.

In 1908, Najeeb M. Saleeby described the Pangutaran Group in The History of Sulu as an island group west of the main Sulu Group. He identified Pangutaran, Pandukan, North Ubian, Laparan, and Tababas or Cap among its principal islands. Saleeby described the islands as generally low and flat and reported that the inhabitants of the group at the time were predominantly Samal.

During the American colonial period, Pangutaran was organized as a municipal district of the Province of Sulu. A 1916 executive order of the Department of Mindanao and Sulu defined the Municipal District of Pangutaran as including Pangutaran, Pandukan, North Ubian, Tikul, Usada, Kunilan, Malikut, Basbas, Kulasain, Tubigan, North Tiumabal, and adjacent smaller islands. The district capital was designated at Sumbahan, and the reorganization took effect on January 1, 1916.

Pangutaran remained a municipal district until the postwar period. Executive Order No. 355, issued by President Carlos P. Garcia on August 26, 1959, converted Pangutaran and several other municipal districts in Sulu into municipalities. The conversion was made effective retroactively from July 1, 1958.

=== Barangays ===
Pangutaran is politically subdivided into 16 barangays. Each barangay consists of puroks while some have sitios.

- Alu Bunah
- Bangkilay
- Kawitan
- Kehi Niog
- Lantong Babag
- Lumah Dapdap
- Pandan Niog
- Panducan
- Panitikan
- Patutol
- Se-ipang
- Simbahan (Poblacion)
- Suang Bunah
- Tonggasang
- Tubig Nonok
- Tubig Sallang

=== Climate ===
Climate data for Pangutaran, Sulu
Month	Jan	Feb	Mar	Apr	May	Jun	Jul	Aug	Sep	Oct	Nov	Dec	Year
Mean daily maximum °C (°F)	29 (84)	29 (84)	29 (84)	30 (86)	30 (86)	30 (86)	30 (86)	30 (86)	30 (86)	30 (86)	29 (84)	29 (84)	30 (85)
Mean daily minimum °C (°F)	25 (77)	24 (75)	24 (75)	25 (77)	25 (77)	25 (77)	25 (77)	25 (77)	25 (77)	25 (77)	25 (77)	25 (77)	25 (77)
Average precipitation mm (inches)	157 (6.2)	115 (4.5)	123 (4.8)	96 (3.8)	136 (5.4)	120 (4.7)	104 (4.1)	89 (3.5)	86 (3.4)	131 (5.2)	151 (5.9)	159 (6.3)	1,467 (57.8)
Average rainy days	20.4	17.5	20.4	21.1	26.7	25.7	26.0	24.5	24.0	27.7	26.3	24.7	285
Source: Meteoblue (modeled/calculated data, not measured locally)

== Demographics ==
Population census of Pangutaran
Year	Pop.	±% p.a.
1903	1,201	—
1918	2,982	+6.25%
1939	7,442	+4.45%
1948	8,536	+1.54%
1960	10,235	+1.52%
1970	16,172	+4.68%
1975	17,823	+1.97%
1980	19,311	+1.62%
1990	17,122	−1.20%
1995	22,846	+5.55%
2000	26,211	+2.99%
2007	29,571	+1.68%
2010	28,461	−1.38%
2015	30,613	+1.40%
2020	36,374	+3.70%
2024	41,575	+3.26%
Source: Philippine Statistics Authority

== Economy ==
Poverty Incidence of Pangutaran

Source: Philippine Statistics Authority

== Etymology ==
The name PANGUTARAN is originally after the "Shariff Pangutaran" name, the first Filipino people who discover and inhabited the island together with the family members (Belong to Salip Descendants). But before what we know today as PANGUTARAN it is also called "Pulau Bangkuruan" by Malay speakers means The island with the Bangkudo tree(s) (Morinda citrifolia). The word phrase "Siyama" stands un impossible originated from the Hindi language meaning "Forbearance" or "kshama:क्षमा" because sheikh Karim Al-Makhdum arrived (in Bohe' Indangan, Simunul, Tawi-Tawi, Philippines in 1380 and propagated Islam) in the Philippines contemporary with Hindi traders from India.
