= Sibuguey Bay =

- Location within the Philippines Sibuguey Bay (Philippines)
- Location: Zamboanga Peninsula, Mindanao Island, Philippines
- Coordinates: 7°30′00″N 122°40′0.12″E
- Type: bay
- Part of: Moro Gulf
- Settlements: Alicia; Ipil; Kabasalan; Naga; Olutanga; Payao; Roseller Lim; Siay; Talusan; Tungawan; Zamboanga City

Sibuguey Bay or Sibugay Bay is a large bay of the Moro Gulf, situated off the southwestern coast of Mindanao Island in the Philippines.

The bay bounds the southern coast of the Zamboanga Peninsula. Along with the Moro Gulf, the bay forms part of the Celebes Sea.

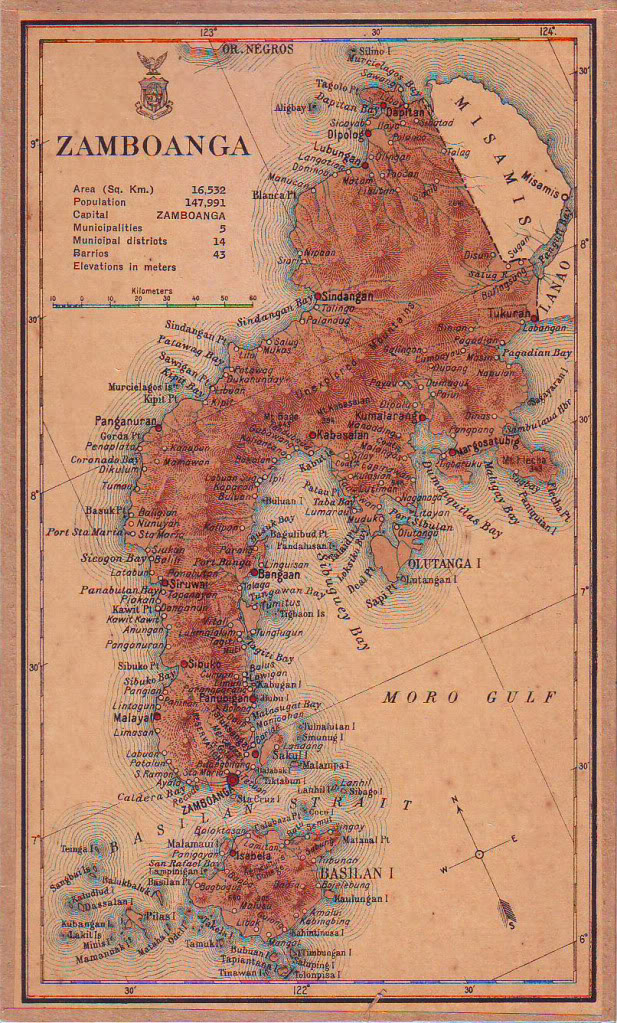
An old map of the Zamboanga peninsula showing the location of Sibuguey Bay

== Fishing ==
The bay supports one of Philippines' richest fish population. It is estimated to supply fish for the 330,000 Sibugaynons inhabiting the area. However, the introduction of new fishing gears, the use of dynamite and the rapid destruction of mangroves have all contributed to a drastic decline in the bay's fish population. The quantity of fish caught by an individual fisherman had dropped ten times below the former quantity.

== See also ==
- Illana Bay — also of Moro Gulf
