= Davao–Samal Bridge =

- Coordinates: 7°06′05″N 125°39′26″E
- Carries: Motor vehicles, pedestrians and bicycles
- Crosses: Pakiputan Strait
- Locale: Davao del Norte, Philippines

Characteristics
- Total length: 3.98 km (13,058 ft)
- Longest span: 275 m (902 ft)
- Clearance above: 47 m (154 ft)
- No. of lanes: 4

History
- Constructed by: China Road and Bridge Corporation; Department of Public Works and Highways Davao Region XI
- Construction cost: ₱23 billion

Location
- Interactive map of Davao–Samal Bridge

The Samal Island–Davao City (SIDC) Connector, commonly known as the Davao–Samal Bridge, is an under-construction bridge that will cross Pakiputan Strait to connect mainland Mindanao via Davao City and Samal, Davao del Norte in the Philippines. On January 14, 2021, the Philippine and Chinese governments signed a contract to design and construct the bridge, costing P23 billion pesos. On October 27, 2022, President Bongbong Marcos led the groundbreaking ceremony for the construction of the bridge.

== Background ==
Plans for a bridge linking mainland Mindanao via Davao City and the island of Samal were made as early as 1970.

The 3.98-kilometer bridge, a flagship project under the “Build, Build, Build” program during the administration of former President Rodrigo Duterte, will be hugely funded through a loan agreement with the Chinese government.

The bridge project will connect the Samal Circumferential Road in Caliclic, Samal to the R. Castillo–Daang Maharlika junction in Buhangin, Davao City across the Pakiputan Strait. The bridge, which is 3.98 kilometers long, will be constructed within five years and is set to be completed and operational in 2027. Once completed, it is expected to reduce travel time from Davao City to Samal from around 30 minutes via ferry to only five minutes. The construction of the bridge will be funded through a loan agreement worth US$350 million or ₱18.67 billion entered into between the Philippines and China, covering 90 percent of the project cost.

As of May 2024, the Department of Public Works and Highways has already started the bridge's civil works phase. Its design includes a 275-meter main span and a 47-meter vertical navigation clearance. Environmentalists and right-of-way owners opposed the project especially on the current bridge alignment, landing site (Lucas-Rodriguez family property) and the offshore construction which could destroy the alleged healthy “Paradise Reef” on the Samal Island side. The 2020 environmental impact assessment of Ove Arup & Partners Hong Kong Ltd. classified the bridge an “environmentally critical project.” In November 2024, the coral reef allegedly underwent ecological succession and was replaced by algae.

The four-lane, cable-stayed bridge is slated to be completed in August 2027. "China Road and Bridge Corporation and DPWH Region XI have finished the bridge's design and planning phase and is currently estimated to be at 3.487% completion rate," Department of Public Works and Highways-11 Director Engr. Juby Cordon announced in a press release.

On July 1, 2025, the Supreme Court of the Philippines issued a Writ of Kalikasan on the bridge project, amid concerns over its adverse effects on marine life in the area.
