= Olutanga =

Island of the Philippines

- Location within the Philippines

Geography
- Coordinates: 7°22′0″N 122°52′54″E
- Adjacent to: Moro Gulf
- Area: 194.1 km^{2} (74.9 sq mi)
- Length: 20 km (12 mi)
- Width: 15 km (9.3 mi)
- Coastline: 89.8 km (55.8 mi)

Administration
- Philippines
- Region: Zamboanga Peninsula
- Province: Zamboanga Sibugay
- Municipalities: Mabuhay; Olutanga; Talusan

Demographics
- Population: 103,701 (2020)
- Pop. density: 534.3/km^{2} (1383.8/sq mi)

Olutanga is a Philippine island in the Moro Gulf, part of Zamboanga Sibugay Province. It is separated from the Zamboanga Peninsula in mainland Mindanao by a narrow channel and Tantanang Bay.

Olutanga, with an area of 194.1 square kilometres (74.9 sq mi), is the largest island in the Moro Gulf and the 34th largest island of the Philippines. It has a shoreline length of 89.8 kilometres (55.8 mi).

The island is subdivided into 3 municipalities (Mabuhay, Talusan, and the namesake Olutanga), and has a total population of 103,701 people.

== See also ==
- List of islands of the Philippines
