= Olutanga, Zamboanga Sibugay =

Municipality in Zamboanga Sibugay, Philippines

Olutanga
- Municipality
- Municipality of Olutanga
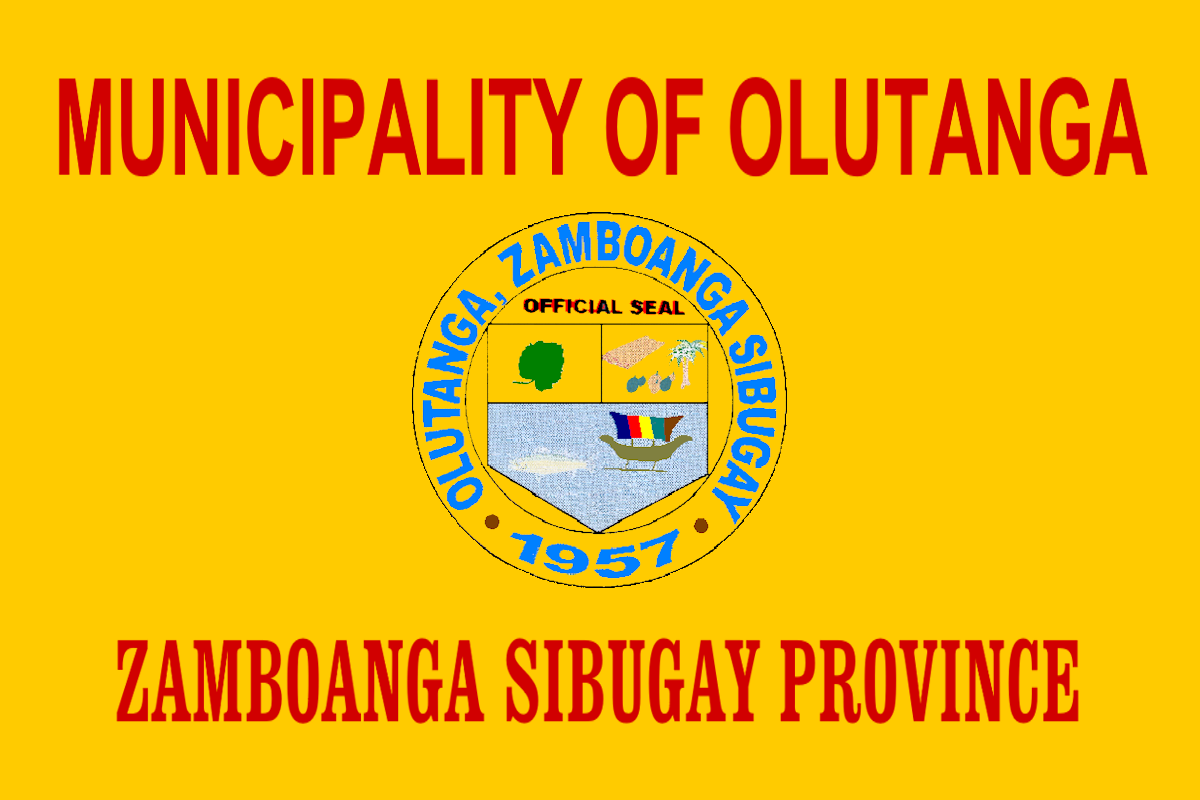
- Flag Seal

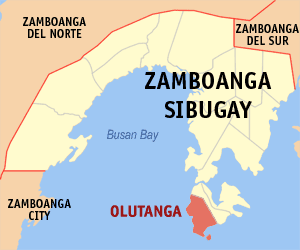
- Map of Zamboanga Sibugay with Olutanga highlighted
- Interactive map of Olutanga
- Location within the Philippines
- Coordinates: 7°18′38″N 122°50′47″E
- Country: Philippines
- Region: Zamboanga Peninsula
- Province: Zamboanga Sibugay
- District: 1st district
- Barangays: 19 (see Barangays)

Government
  - Type: Sangguniang Bayan
  - Mayor: Arthur P. Ruste Sr.
  - Vice Mayor: Janie Bert D. Gumba
  - Representative: Wilter W. Palma II
  - Municipal Council: Members: Mercedita B. Conturno; James R. Nique Jr.; Jimmy Joseph Siso; Abdurahman I. Mahamod; Michael A. Samat; Wenielyn N. Plania; Nursida A. Jambiran; Elmie P. Pede
  - Electorate: 17,628 voters (2025)

Area
  - Total: 113.30 km^{2} (43.75 sq mi)
- Elevation: 12 m (39 ft)
- Highest elevation: 83 m (272 ft)
- Lowest elevation: 0 m (0 ft)

Population (2024 census)
  - Total: 34,124
  - Density: 301.18/km^{2} (780.06/sq mi)
  - Households: 8,125

Economy
  - Income class: 2nd municipal income class
  - Poverty incidence: 27.55% (2021)
  - Revenue: ₱ 183.9 million (2024)
  - Assets: ₱ 566.7 million (2024)
  - Expenditure: ₱ 64.47 million (2024)
  - Liabilities: ₱ 157.1 million (2024)

Service provider
  - Electricity: Zamboanga del Sur 2 Electric Cooperative (ZAMSURECO 2)
- Time zone: UTC+8 (PST)
- ZIP code: 7041
- PSGC: 0908310000
- IDD : area code: +63 (0)62
- Native languages: Subanon; Cebuano; Chavacano; Tagalog
- Website: www.olutangasibugay.gov.ph

Olutanga, officially the Municipality of Olutanga (Cebuano: Lungsod sa Olutanga; Chavacano: Municipalidad de Olutanga; Tagalog: Bayan ng Olutanga), is a municipality in the province of Zamboanga Sibugay, Philippines. According to the 2024 census, it has a population of 34,124 people.

The municipality is in the southwestern part of the eponymous Olutanga Island.

== Geography ==
=== Barangays ===
Olutanga is subdivided into 19 barangays. Each barangay consists of puroks while some have sitios.

- Bateria
- Calais
- Esperanza
- Fama
- Galas
- Gandaan
- Kahayagan
- Looc Sapi
- Matim
- Noque
- Pulo Laum
- Pulo Mabao
- San Isidro
- San Jose
- Santa Maria
- Solar (Poblacion)
- Tambanan
- Villacorte
- Villagonzalo

=== Climate ===
Climate data for Olutanga, Zamboanga Sibugay
Month	Jan	Feb	Mar	Apr	May	Jun	Jul	Aug	Sep	Oct	Nov	Dec	Year
Mean daily maximum °C (°F)	31 (88)	31 (88)	31 (88)	31 (88)	30 (86)	29 (84)	29 (84)	29 (84)	29 (84)	29 (84)	30 (86)	30 (86)	30 (86)
Mean daily minimum °C (°F)	23 (73)	23 (73)	23 (73)	24 (75)	25 (77)	25 (77)	24 (75)	24 (75)	24 (75)	24 (75)	24 (75)	23 (73)	24 (75)
Average precipitation mm (inches)	61 (2.4)	55 (2.2)	75 (3.0)	81 (3.2)	145 (5.7)	189 (7.4)	189 (7.4)	197 (7.8)	162 (6.4)	181 (7.1)	115 (4.5)	70 (2.8)	1,520 (59.9)
Average rainy days	16.4	15.7	19.1	21.5	26.9	27.1	26.4	25.0	24.2	26.8	23.5	18.7	271.3
Source: Meteoblue

== Demographics ==
Population census of Olutanga
Year	Pop.	±% p.a.
1960	16,926	—
1970	16,991	+0.04%
1975	15,623	−1.67%
1980	14,539	−1.43%
1990	16,378	+1.20%
1995	17,069	+0.78%
2000	22,624	+6.23%
2007	27,521	+2.74%
2010	28,717	+1.56%
2015	33,671	+3.08%
2020	38,438	+2.83%
2024	34,124	−2.82%
Source: Philippine Statistics Authority

== Economy ==
Poverty incidence of Olutanga (%)

Source: Philippine Statistics Authority

== Education ==
=== Tertiary ===
- Western Mindanao State University - External Studies Unit (WMSU)

=== High schools ===
- Loyola High School
- Olutanga National High School
- Pantaleon Cudiera National High School (Formerly Bateria NHS)

=== Elementary ===
- Olutanga Central Elementary School
- Bateria Elementary School
- Buhangin Mahaba Elementary School
- Esperanza Elementary School
- Fama Elementary School
- Gandaan Elementary School
- Kahayagan Elementary School
- Kalines Elementary School (Formerly Calais ES)
- Kauswagan Elementary School
- Matim Elementary School
- Pulo Laum Elementary school
- San Jose Elementary School
- Santa Maria Elementary School
- Tambanan Elementary School
- Villa Gonzalo Elementary School
- Villacorte Elementary School

=== Primary ===
- San Isidro Primary School
