= 2025 Zamboanga Sibugay local elections =

9th local election in Zamboanga Sibugay

2025 Zamboanga Sibugay gubernatorial election
- May 12, 2022
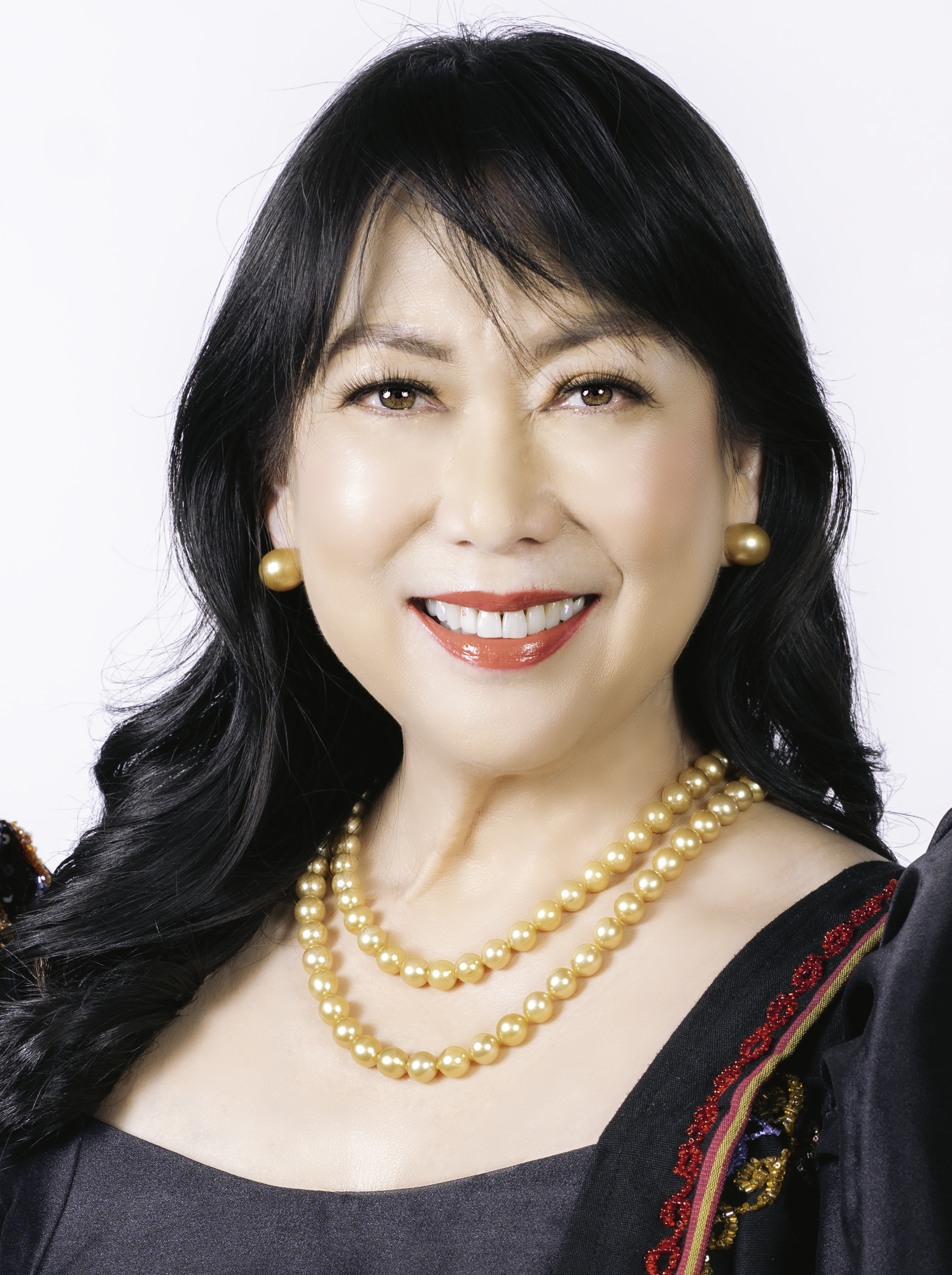

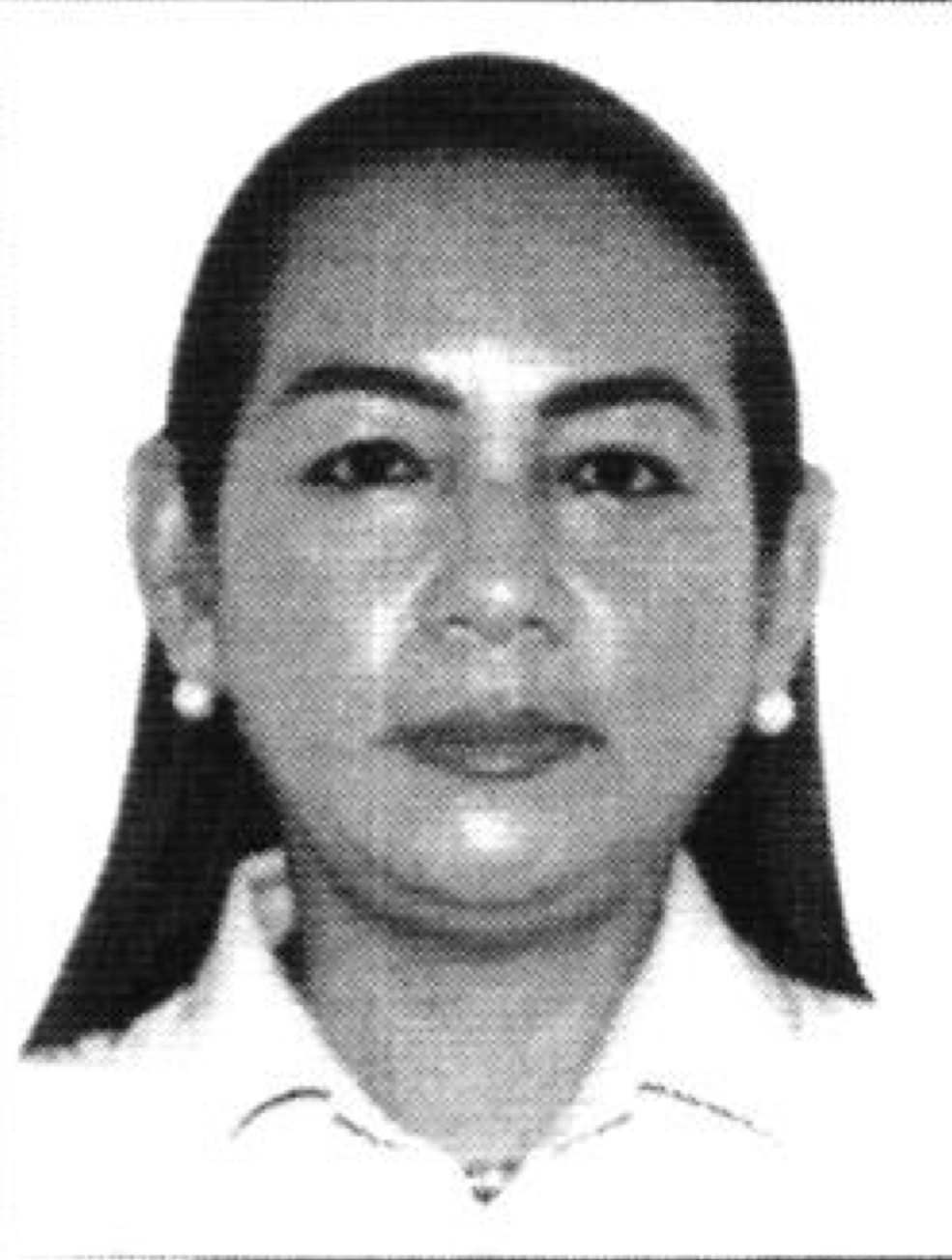
| Nominee | Dulce Ann Hofer | Yvonne Palma |
| Party | PFP | Lakas |
| Running mate | Ric-Ric Olegario | Chanti Olegario |
| Popular vote | 211,433 | 129,783 |
| Percentage | 61.96% | 38.04% |
Governor before election
Dulce Ann Hofer
PDP–Laban
Elected Governor
Dulce Ann Hofer
PFP

Local elections were held in the province of Zamboanga Sibugay of the Philippines, on May 12, 2025, as part of the 2025 general election. The voters of Zamboanga Sibugay selected candidates for all local positions: a municipal, a vice mayor and councilors, as well as members of the Sangguniang Panlalawigan, the governor, vice governor and representatives for the two Districts of Zamboanga Sibugay.

== Coalitions ==
=== Administration Coalition ===
Team Hofer Olegario
| # | Name | Party | Result |
For Governor
| 1. | Dulce Ann Hofer | PFP | Won |
For Vice Governor
| 3. | Ric-Ric Olegario | Nacionalista | Won |
1st District
For House of Representative
| 1. | Marlo Bancoro | PFP | Won |
For Board Member
| 3. | Ralph Hofer delos Santos | PFP | Won |
| 5. | Roger Lu | PFP | Won |
| 6. | Jinky Mendoza | PFP | Won |
| 9. | Boyet Cabilao Yambao | Nacionalista | Won |
| 10. | Jung-Jung Yanga | PFP | Won |
2nd District
For House of Representative
| 5. | Marly Hofer-Hasim | PFP | Won |
For Board Member
| 1. | Win Alibutdan | Akbayan | Won |
| 5. | Pava Hofer | PFP | Won |
| 8. | Dantoy Oporto | PFP | Lost |
| 9. | Judge Glenn Sabijon | Nacionalista | Won |
| 10. | Pia Shuck | NPC | Lost |

=== Opposition Coalition ===
Team Palma Olegario
| # | Name | Party | Result |
For Governor
| 2. | Yvonne Palma | Lakas | Lost |
For Vice Governor
| 2. | Chanti Olegario | Lakas | Lost |
1st District
For House of Representative
| 2. | Wilter Palma Sr. | Lakas | Lost |
For Board Member
| 1. | Gary Buendia | Lakas | Lost |
| 2. | Mercy Conturno | Lakas | Lost |
| 4. | Jessie Lagas | Lakas | Lost |
| 7. | Katrina Ann Palma | Lakas | Lost |
| 8. | Love Silva | Lakas | Lost |
2nd District
For House of Representatives
| 3. | Antonieta Eudela | Lakas | Lost |
For Board Member
| 2. | Nonoy Castillo | Lakas | Lost |
| 3. | Bob Chiong | Lakas | Lost |
| 4. | Nat-Nat Eudela | Lakas | Won |
| 6. | Vic Javier | Lakas | Won |
| 7. | Raco Olegario | Lakas | Lost |

=== Independent and Other Party Coalition ===
Team Independent and Other Parties
| # | Name | Party | Result |
For Vice Governor
| 1. | Ren delos Reyes | Independent | Lost |
2nd District
For House of Representative
| 1. | Jarjar Acosta | PDP | Lost |
| 2. | Rino delos Reyes | Independent | Lost |
| 4. | Jose Gerosa | Independent | Lost |
| 6. | Al-Sharief Muloc | Independent | Lost |

== Provincial elections ==
All incumbents are marked in italics.

=== Governor ===
Incumbent Governor Dulce Ann Hofer ran for re-election after being elected in 2022 under PDP-Laban (now PDP), she ran under Partido Federal ng Pilipinas and Incumbent 1st district Sangguniang Panlalawigan member, Yvonne Palma fielded by Lakas–CMD, was her only opponent.

2025 Zamboanga Sibugay gubernatorial election
| Candidate | Party | Votes | % |
|---|---|---|---|
| Dulce Ann Hofer | PFP | 211,433 | 61.96 |
| Yvonne Palma | Lakas-CMD | 129,783 | 38.04 |
| Total | | 341,216 | 100.00 |
| Registered voters/turnout | | 428,422 | – |
| Partido Federal ng Pilipinas hold | | | |

==== Results by municipality ====
| Municipality | Hofer | | Palma | | Total valid votes cast |
| Municipality | Votes | % | Votes | % | Total valid votes cast |
|---|---|---|---|---|---|
| Alicia | 12,675 | 65.05% | 6,811 | 34.95% | 19,486 |
| Buug | 10,489 | 52.17% | 9,617 | 47.83% | 20,106 |
| Diplahan | 5,405 | 31.2% | 11,502 | 66.39% | 18,711 |
| Imelda | 9,634 | 59.59% | 6,533 | 40.41% | 16,167 |
| Ipil | 31,782 | 66.74% | 15,841 | 33.26% | 47,623 |
| Kabasalan | 21,693 | 77.31% | 6,367 | 22.69% | 28,060 |
| Mabuhay | 7,960 | 64.79% | 4,326 | 35.21% | 12,286 |
| Malangas | 11,500 | 64.34% | 6,375 | 35.66% | 17,875 |
| Naga | 14,145 | 64.07% | 7,933 | 35.93% | 22,078 |
| Olutanga | 9,086 | 60.36% | 5,968 | 39.64% | 15,054 |
| Payao | 11,477 | 65.4% | 6,072 | 34.6% | 17,549 |
| Roseller Lim | 12,783 | 56.37% | 9,894 | 43.63% | 22,677 |
| Siay | 11,399 | 56.84% | 8,654 | 43.16% | 20,053 |
| Talusan | 6,544 | 74.01% | 2,298 | 25.99% | 8,842 |
| Titay | 20,349 | 67.57% | 9,765 | 32.43% | 30,114 |
| Tungawan | 13,183 | 53.73% | 11,352 | 46.27% | 24,535 |
| Totals | 211,433 | 61.96% | 129,783 | 38.04% | 341,216 |

=== Vice governor ===
Incumbent Vice Governor Rey Andre Olegario of the Nacionalista Party retired.

The Nacionalista Party nominated incumbent 2nd district Sangguniang Panlalawigan member, Ric-Ric Olegario, he ran against two other candidates.

2025 Zamboanga Sibugay Vice Gubernatorial election
| Candidate | Party | Votes | % |
|---|---|---|---|
| Ric-Ric Olegario | Nacionalista | 175,301 | 56.23 |
| Chanti Olegario | Lakas-CMD | 123,978 | 39.77 |
| Ren delos Reyes | Independent | 12,453 | 3.99 |
| Total | | 311,732 | 100.00 |
| Registered voters/turnout | | 428,422 | – |
| Nacionalista hold | | | |

==== Results by municipality ====
| Municipality | R. Olegario | | C. Olegario | | Delos Reyes | | Total valid votes cast |
| Municipality | Votes | % | Votes | % | Votes | % | Total valid votes cast |
|---|---|---|---|---|---|---|---|
| Alicia | 10,760 | 61.62% | 5,971 | 34.19% | 731 | 4.19% | 17,462 |
| Buug | 8,046 | 43.99% | 9,509 | 51.99% | 734 | 4.01% | 18,289 |
| Diplahan | 5,405 | 31.2% | 11,502 | 66.39% | 417 | 2.41% | 17,324 |
| Imelda | 8,295 | 55.73% | 6,222 | 41.81% | 366 | 2.46% | 14,883 |
| Ipil | 27,856 | 61.08% | 16,908 | 37.08% | 840 | 1.84% | 45,604 |
| Kabasalan | 18,511 | 71.47% | 6,530 | 25.21% | 859 | 3.32% | 25,900 |
| Mabuhay | 6,446 | 57.66% | 4,190 | 37.48% | 544 | 4.87% | 11,180 |
| Malangas | 9,702 | 60.38% | 5,750 | 35.79% | 616 | 3.83% | 16,068 |
| Naga | 9,500 | 48.42% | 6,962 | 35.49% | 3,157 | 16.09% | 19,619 |
| Olutanga | 7,634 | 54.91% | 5,820 | 41.86% | 449 | 3.23% | 13,903 |
| Payao | 9,523 | 60.83% | 5,570 | 35.58% | 563 | 3.6% | 15,656 |
| Roseller Lim | 11,836 | 56.54% | 8,655 | 41.34% | 444 | 2.12% | 20,935 |
| Siay | 10,805 | 61.1% | 6,235 | 35.26% | 645 | 3.65% | 17,685 |
| Talusan | 4,373 | 58.33% | 2,403 | 32.05% | 721 | 9.62% | 7,497 |
| Titay | 16,293 | 59.74% | 10,287 | 37.72% | 691 | 2.53% | 27,271 |
| Tungawan | 10,316 | 45.94% | 11,464 | 51.05% | 676 | 3.01% | 22,456 |
| Totals | 175,301 | 56.23% | 123,978 | 39.77% | 12,453 | 3.99% | 311,732 |

=== Provincial board ===
| Party | Votes | % | Seats |
|---|---|---|---|
| Lakas-CMD | 557,512 | 43.09 | 2 |
| PFP | 427,135 | 33.01 | 5 |
| Nacionalista | 169,695 | 13.11 | 2 |
| Akbayan | 73,329 | 5.67 | 1 |
| NPC | 66,240 | 5.12 | 0 |
| Total | 1,293,911 | 100.00 | 10 |
| Registered voters/turnout | 428,422 | – | |

==== 1st District ====
- Municipalities: Alicia, Buug, Diplahan, Imelda, Mabuhay, Malangas, Olutanga, Payao, Talusan

2025 Zamboanga Sibugay Provincial Board Election in the 1st District of Zamboanga Sibugay
| Candidate | Party | Votes | % |
|---|---|---|---|
| Jung-Jung Yanga | PFP | 73,232 | 12.40 |
| Jinky Mendoza | PFP | 71,336 | 12.08 |
| Boyet Cabilao Yambao | Nacionalista | 69,610 | 11.78 |
| Ralph Hofer delos Santos | PFP | 65,219 | 11.04 |
| Roger Lu | PFP | 61,032 | 10.33 |
| Jessie Lagas | Lakas-CMD | 57,559 | 9.74 |
| Katrina Ann Palma | Lakas-CMD | 56,323 | 9.53 |
| Gary Buendia | Lakas-CMD | 49,530 | 8.38 |
| Love Silva | Lakas-CMD | 45,183 | 7.65 |
| Mercy Conturno | Lakas-CMD | 41,690 | 7.06 |
| Total | | 590,714 | 100.00 |
| Registered voters/turnout | | 179,359 | – |

==== 2nd District ====
- Municipalities: Ipil, Kabasalan, Naga, Roseller Lim, Siay, Titay, Tungawan

2025 Zamboanga Sibugay Provincial Board Election in the 2nd District of Zamboanga Sibugay
| Candidate | Party | Votes | % |
|---|---|---|---|
| Judge Glenn Sabijon | Nacionalista | 100,085 | 14.23 |
| Pava Hofer | PFP | 99,535 | 14.15 |
| Vic Javier | Lakas-CMD | 89,231 | 12.69 |
| Win Alibutdan | Akbayan | 73,329 | 10.43 |
| Nat-Nat Eudela | Lakas-CMD | 71,330 | 10.14 |
| Pia Shuck | NPC | 66,240 | 9.42 |
| Raco Olegario | Lakas-CMD | 58,723 | 8.35 |
| Dantoy Oporto | PFP | 56,781 | 8.07 |
| Nonoy Casillo | Lakas-CMD | 56,201 | 7.99 |
| Bob Chiong | Lakas-CMD | 31,742 | 4.51 |
| Total | | 703,197 | 100.00 |
| Registered voters/turnout | | 249,063 | – |

== Congressional elections ==
=== 1st District ===
Incumbent Representative Wilter Palma ran for re-election against 1st District Sangguniang Panlalawigan member, Marlo Bancoro of Partido Federal ng Pilipinas.

2025 Zamboanga Sibugay Philippine House of Representatives election in the 1st District of Zamboanga Sibugay
| Candidate | Party | Votes | % |
|---|---|---|---|
| Marlo Bancoro | PFP | 81,915 | 55.98 |
| Wilter Palma | Lakas-CMD | 64,415 | 44.02 |
| Total | | 146,330 | 100.00 |
| Registered voters/turnout | | 179,359 | – |
| PFP gain from Lakas-CMD | | | |

=== 2nd District ===
Incumbent Representative Antonieta Eudela ran for re-election against Doctor Marly Hofer-Hasim of Partido Federal ng Pilipinas, Siay Mayor Jarjar Acosta of Partido Demokratiko Pilipino, and 3 other candidates.

2025 Zamboanga Sibugay Philippine House of Representatives election in the 1st District of Zamboanga Sibugay
| Candidate | Party | Votes | % |
|---|---|---|---|
| Marly Hofer-Hasim | PFP | 92,835 | 48.95 |
| Antonieta Eudela | Lakas-CMD | 71,823 | 37.87 |
| Jarjar Acosta | PDP | 22,108 | 11.66 |
| Rino delos Reyes | Independent | 2,607 | 1.37 |
| Jose Gerosa | Independent | 167 | 0.09 |
| Al-Sharief Muloc | Independent | 122 | 0.06 |
| Total | | 189,662 | 100.00 |
| Registered voters/turnout | | 249,063 | – |
| PFP gain from Lakas-CMD | | | |

== Municipal elections ==
=== 1st District ===
==== Alicia ====
Incumbent Mayor Alvie Musa ran for re-election.

Alicia Mayoral Election
| Candidate | Party | Votes | % |
|---|---|---|---|
| Alvie Musa | PFP | 14,337 | 71.56 |
| Ariel Azuelo | UNA | 5,422 | 27.06 |
| Nursidin Laja | Independent | 277 | 1.38 |
| Total | | 20,036 | 100.00 |
| Registered voters/turnout | | 25,212 | – |
| PFP hold | | | |

Incumbent Vice Mayor Jun Escamillan ran for re-election.

Alicia Vice Mayoral Election
| Candidate | Party | Votes | % |
|---|---|---|---|
| Jun Escamillan | PFP | 15,269 | 79.79 |
| Gally Musa | UNA | 3,867 | 20.21 |
| Total | | 19,136 | 100.00 |
| Registered voters/turnout | | 25,212 | – |
| PFP hold | | | |

==== Buug ====
Incumbent Mayor Dionesia Lagas ran for re-election.

Buug Mayoral Election
| Candidate | Party | Votes | % |
|---|---|---|---|
| Dionesia Lagas | Lakas-CMD | 10,961 | 54.74 |
| Nonoy Cordenillo | PFP | 9,062 | 45.26 |
| Total | | 20,023 | 100.00 |
| Registered voters/turnout | | 24,616 | – |
| Lakas-CMD hold | | | |

Incumbent Vice Mayor Jonam Lagas ran for re-election.

Buug Vice Mayoral Election
| Candidate | Party | Votes | % |
|---|---|---|---|
| Jonam Lagas | Lakas-CMD | 10,460 | 53.65 |
| Alfonso Becada | PFP | 8,919 | 45.75 |
| Angelito Pidor | Independent | 118 | 0.61 |
| Total | | 19,497 | 100.00 |
| Registered voters/turnout | | 24,616 | – |
| Lakas-CMD hold | | | |

==== Diplahan ====
Incumbent Mayor Eric Palma ran for re-election

Diplahan Mayoral Election
| Candidate | Party | Votes | % |
|---|---|---|---|
| Eric Palma | Lakas-CMD | 12,690 | 69.87 |
| Lloyd Bancoro Valencia | PFP | 5,473 | 30.13 |
| Total | | 18,163 | 100.00 |
| Registered voters/turnout | | 22,160 | – |
| Lakas-CMD hold | | | |

Incumbent Vice Mayor Ramil Villaruel ran for re-election.

Diplahan Vice Mayoral Election
| Candidate | Party | Votes | % |
|---|---|---|---|
| Ramil Villaruel | Lakas-CMD | 11,938 | 66.52 |
| Dodong Mahinay | PFP | 6,009 | 33.48 |
| Total | | 17,947 | 100.00 |
| Registered voters/turnout | | 22,160 | – |
| Lakas-CMD hold | | | |

==== Imelda ====
Incumbent Mayor Jerry Silva opted not to run to let his wife, Vice Mayor and Former Mayor Roselyn Silva run for the position.

Imelda Mayoral Election
| Candidate | Party | Votes | % |
|---|---|---|---|
| Arnoldo Famor | Nacionalista | 9,738 | 59.63 |
| Roselyn Silva | Lakas-CMD | 6,592 | 40.37 |
| Total | | 16,330 | 100.00 |
| Registered voters/turnout | | 18,877 | – |
| Nacionalista gain from Lakas-CMD | | | |

Incumbent Vice Mayor Roselyn Silva was eligible for re-election but opted to run for Mayor, a position she held from 2013 to 2022 where her husband succeeded her position in 2022. Her party fielded Bruno Doring for the position.

Imelda Vice Mayoral Election
| Candidate | Party | Votes | % |
|---|---|---|---|
| Federico Gonzales | PFP | 9,511 | 59.76 |
| Bruno Doring | Lakas-CMD | 6,405 | 40.24 |
| Total | | 15,916 | 100.00 |
| Registered voters/turnout | | 18,877 | – |
| PFP gain from Lakas-CMD | | | |

==== Mabuhay ====
Incumbent Mayor Indaylou Caloñge ran for re-election unopposed.

Mabuhay Mayoral Election
| Candidate | Party | Votes | % |
|---|---|---|---|
| Indaylou Caloñge | Nacionalista | 10,485 | 100.00 |
| Total | | 10,485 | 100.00 |
| Registered voters/turnout | | 15,819 | – |
| Nacionalista hold | | | |

Incumbent Vice Mayor Joval John Salmonte ran for re-election unopposed.

Mabuhay Vice Mayoral Election
| Candidate | Party | Votes | % |
|---|---|---|---|
| Joval John Salmonte | Nacionalista | 10,357 | 100.00 |
| Total | | 10,357 | 100.00 |
| Registered voters/turnout | | 15,819 | – |
| Nacionalista hold | | | |

==== Malangas ====
Incumbent Mayor Marcelo Baquial Jr was eligible for re-election but opted to run for Vice Mayor.

Malangas Mayoral Election
| Candidate | Party | Votes | % |
|---|---|---|---|
| Apple Yambao | Nacionalista | 10,902 | 61.48 |
| Arlene Calunod | Lakas-CMD | 5,186 | 29.24 |
| Roberto Intol | Akbayan | 1,601 | 9.03 |
| Pingping Tu | Independent | 44 | 0.25 |
| Total | | 17,733 | 100.00 |
| Registered voters/turnout | | 22,123 | – |
| Nacionalista gain from PFP | | | |

Incumbent Vice Mayor Roberto Intol was term-limited and opted to run for Mayor. His wife, Nilda Intol ran for Vice Mayor for the Position.

Malangas Vice Mayoral Election
| Candidate | Party | Votes | % |
|---|---|---|---|
| Marcelo Baquial Jr | PFP | 13,160 | 76.15 |
| Nilda Intol | KNP | 2,774 | 16.05 |
| Lloyed Buensuceso | Lakas-CMD | 1,348 | 7.80 |
| Total | | 17,282 | 100.00 |
| Registered voters/turnout | | 22,123 | – |
| PFP gain from Akbayan | | | |

==== Olutanga ====
Incumbent Mayor Arthur Ruste ran for re-election.

Olutanga Mayoral Election
| Candidate | Party | Votes | % |
|---|---|---|---|
| Arthur Ruste Sr. | PFP | 8,791 | 58.26 |
| Janjan Gumba | Lakas-CMD | 6,134 | 40.65 |
| Reniel Cañete | Independent | 165 | 1.09 |
| Total | | 15,090 | 100.00 |
| Registered voters/turnout | | 17,628 | – |
| PFP hold | | | |

Incumbent Vice Mayor Janjan Gumba was eligible to run for re-election but opted to run for mayor. his party fielded Jim Siso for the position.

Olutanga Vice Mayoral Election
| Candidate | Party | Votes | % |
|---|---|---|---|
| Arnel Ruste | PFP | 8,883 | 59.46 |
| Jim Siso | Lakas-CMD | 6,057 | 40.54 |
| Total | | 14,940 | 100.00 |
| Registered voters/turnout | | 17,628 | – |
| PFP gain from Lakas-CMD | | | |

==== Payao ====
Incumbent Mayor Joshua Mendoza ran for re-election.

Payao Mayoral Election
| Candidate | Party | Votes | % |
|---|---|---|---|
| Joshua Mendoza | Lakas-CMD | 11,780 | 65.65 |
| Julius Acosta Sr | PFP | 6,165 | 34.35 |
| Total | | 17,945 | 100.00 |
| Registered voters/turnout | | 21,784 | – |
| Lakas-CMD hold | | | |

Incumbent Vice Mayor Joel Indino was term-limited and opted to run for Councilor.

Payao Vice Mayoral Election
| Candidate | Party | Votes | % |
|---|---|---|---|
| Joeper Mendoza | Nacionalista | 12,584 | 72.45 |
| Renie Jemlani | UNA | 4,786 | 27.55 |
| Total | | 17,370 | 100.00 |
| Registered voters/turnout | | 21,784 | – |
| Nacionalista gain from PFP | | | |

==== Talusan ====
Incumbent Mayor Bobing Edem ran for re-election.

Talusan Mayoral Election
| Candidate | Party | Votes | % |
|---|---|---|---|
| Bobing Edem | PFP | 5,472 | 61.00 |
| Bandong Yuayan | PDP | 3,499 | 39.00 |
| Total | | 8,971 | 100.00 |
| Registered voters/turnout | | 11,140 | – |
| PFP hold | | | |

Incumbent Vice Mayor Loloy Ramiso ran for re-election unopposed.

Talusan Vice Mayoral Election
| Candidate | Party | Votes | % |
|---|---|---|---|
| Loloy Ramiso | Nacionalista | 6,298 | 100.00 |
| Total | | 6,298 | 100.00 |
| Registered voters/turnout | | 11,140 | – |
| Nacionalista hold | | | |

=== 2nd District ===
==== Ipil ====
Incumbent Mayor Amy Olegario was term-limited and opted to run as Vice Mayor. Her party fielded Richard Chiu for Position.

Ipil Mayoral Election
| Candidate | Party | Votes | % |
|---|---|---|---|
| Rambo Olegario | PFP | 29,597 | 63.28 |
| Richard Chiu | Lakas-CMD | 16,124 | 34.48 |
| Glen Tubilan | Independent | 1,048 | 2.24 |
| Total | | 46,769 | 100.00 |
| Registered voters/turnout | | 60,353 | – |
| PFP gain from Lakas-CMD | | | |

Incumbent Vice Mayor Rambo Olegario was eligible to run for re-election but opted to run for Mayor. His party fielded Edna Alibutdan for the position.

Ipil Vice Mayoral Election
| Candidate | Party | Votes | % |
|---|---|---|---|
| Amy Olegario | Lakas-CMD | 26,785 | 59.01 |
| Edna Alibutdan | PFP | 17,980 | 39.61 |
| Toto Olog | Independent | 628 | 1.38 |
| Total | | 45,393 | 100.00 |
| Registered voters/turnout | | 60,353 | – |
| Lakas-CMD gain from PFP | | | |

==== Kabasalan ====
Incumbent Mayor Katrina Balladares ran for re-election.

Kabasalan Mayoral Election
| Candidate | Party | Votes | % |
|---|---|---|---|
| Katrina Balladares | PFP | 20,290 | 70.89 |
| Sheila Bauzon | Lakas-CMD | 4,071 | 14.22 |
| Luvly Grace Cainglet | UNA | 3,998 | 13.97 |
| Cherrie Ann Cainglet | Independent | 195 | 0.68 |
| Michael Cainglet | Independent | 67 | 0.23 |
| Total | | 28,621 | 100.00 |
| Registered voters/turnout | | 34,171 | – |
| PFP hold | | | |

Incumbent Vice Mayor Gani Balladares ran for re-election.

Kabasalan Vice Mayoral Election
| Candidate | Party | Votes | % |
|---|---|---|---|
| Gani Balladares | PFP | 17,915 | 63.79 |
| Dondon Morales | Lakas-CMD | 7,247 | 25.80 |
| Edi Deita | UNA | 2,923 | 10.41 |
| Total | | 28,085 | 100.00 |
| Registered voters/turnout | | 34,171 | – |
| PFP hold | | | |

==== Naga ====
Incumbent Mayor Rino delos Reyes was term-limited and opted to run for the Representative of Zamboanga Sibugay's 2nd district.

Naga Mayoral Election
| Candidate | Party | Votes | % |
|---|---|---|---|
| Kambal Balladares | Nacionalista | 14,523 | 62.82 |
| Chennie delos Reyes | PFP | 8,108 | 35.07 |
| Jouie Kambal Villares | Independent | 489 | 2.12 |
| Total | | 23,120 | 100.00 |
| Registered voters/turnout | | 28,194 | – |
| PFP gain from Independent | | | |

Incumbent Vice Mayor Romeo Pantag ran for re-election.

Naga Vice Mayoral Election
| Candidate | Party | Votes | % |
|---|---|---|---|
| Jimboy Jambaro | Lakas-CMD | 7,833 | 35.22 |
| Romeo Pantag | PFP | 7,420 | 33.36 |
| Ayok Jaliol | Nacionalista | 6,989 | 31.42 |
| Total | | 22,242 | 100.00 |
| Registered voters/turnout | | 28,194 | – |
| Lakas-CMD gain from PFP | | | |

==== Roseller T. Lim (Surabay) ====
Incumbent Mayor Papong Piodena ran for re-election unopposed.

Roseller T. Lim Mayoral Election
| Candidate | Party | Votes | % |
|---|---|---|---|
| Papong Piodena | Nacionalista | 20,594 | 100.00 |
| Total | | 20,594 | 100.00 |
| Registered voters/turnout | | 28,873 | – |
| Nacionalista hold | | | |

Incumbent Vice Mayor Queenie Piodena ran for re-election unopposed.

Roseller T. Lim Vice Mayoral Election
| Candidate | Party | Votes | % |
|---|---|---|---|
| Papong Piodena | Nacionalista | 19,544 | 100.00 |
| Total | | 19,544 | 100.00 |
| Registered voters/turnout | | 28,873 | – |
| Nacionalista hold | | | |

==== Siay ====
Incumbent Mayor Jarjar Acosta was term-limited and opted to run for the Representative of Zamboanga Sibugay's 2nd district.

Siay Mayoral Election
| Candidate | Party | Votes | % |
|---|---|---|---|
| Jun-Jun Acosta | PFP | 17,642 | 87.32 |
| Yoly Tumampos | Independent | 1,975 | 9.78 |
| Jacinth Mendoza | PPP | 586 | 2.90 |
| Total | | 20,203 | 100.00 |
| Registered voters/turnout | | 25,960 | – |
| PFP gain from PDP | | | |

Incumbent Vice Mayor Jun-Jun Acosta was term-limited and opted to run for Mayor. His party fielded Gerald Acosta for the position.

Siay Vice Mayoral Election
| Candidate | Party | Votes | % |
|---|---|---|---|
| Gerald Acosta | PFP | 15,346 | 76.73 |
| Danilo Braza | Independent | 4,655 | 23.27 |
| Total | | 20,001 | 100.00 |
| Registered voters/turnout | | 25,960 | – |
| PFP hold | | | |

==== Titay ====
Incumbent Mayor Bobong Talania was term limited and opted to run for Mayor. His party fielded Manangrose Talania for the position.

Titay Mayoral Election
| Candidate | Party | Votes | % |
|---|---|---|---|
| Donrio Martinez | Lakas-CMD | 16,100 | 52.49 |
| Manangrose Talania | PFP | 14,574 | 47.51 |
| Total | | 30,674 | 100.00 |
| Registered voters/turnout | | 37,145 | – |
| Lakas-CMD gain from PFP | | | |

Incumbent Vice Mayor Elizer Yamarao was eligible for re-election but opted not to run.

Titay Vice Mayoral Election
| Candidate | Party | Votes | % |
|---|---|---|---|
| Bobong Talania | PFP | 17,593 | 58.84 |
| George Castillo | Lakas-CMD | 12,309 | 41.16 |
| Total | | 29,902 | 100.00 |
| Registered voters/turnout | | 37,145 | – |
| PFP gain from Nacionalista | | | |

==== Tungawan ====
Incumbent Mayor Carlnan Climaco was term-limited and opted to run for Vice Mayor. his party fielded Lalay Climaco for the position.

Tungawan Mayoral Election
| Candidate | Party | Votes | % |
|---|---|---|---|
| Lito Aniñon | Lakas-CMD | 12,687 | 51.19 |
| Lalay Climaco | PFP | 12,096 | 48.81 |
| Total | | 24,783 | 100.00 |
| Registered voters/turnout | | 34,367 | – |
| Lakas-CMD gain from PFP | | | |

Incumbent Vice Mayor Ivan Balano was term limited but opted not to run. his party fielded Karen Garcia for the position.

Tungawan Vice Mayoral Election
| Candidate | Party | Votes | % |
|---|---|---|---|
| Karen Garcia | Lakas-CMD | 11,990 | 49.86 |
| Carlnan Climaco | PFP | 11,619 | 48.32 |
| Necias Vercide | PDP | 437 | 1.82 |
| Total | | 24,046 | 100.00 |
| Registered voters/turnout | | 34,367 | – |
| Lakas-CMD hold | | | |
