= 2022 Philippine House of Representatives elections in the Zamboanga Peninsula =

- May 9, 2022
- All 9 Zamboanga Peninsula seats in the House of Representatives
Party	Seats	+/–
PDP–Laban	4	−1
Lakas	3	New
Liberal	1	0
AZAP	1	+1
This lists parties that won seats. See the complete results below.

The 2022 Philippine House of Representatives elections in the Zamboanga Peninsula were held on May 9, 2022.

== Summary ==
Congressional district	Incumbent	Incumbent's party	Winner	Winner's party	Winning margin
Zamboanga City–1st	Jawo Jimenez	NPC	Khymer Adan Olaso	AZAP	12.03%
Zamboanga City–2nd	Mannix Dalipe	Lakas	Mannix Dalipe	Lakas	18.44%
Zamboanga del Norte–1st	Jon-jon Jalosjos	Nacionalista	Pinpin Uy	PDP–Laban	0.33%
Zamboanga del Norte–2nd	Glona Labadlabad	PDP–Laban	Glona Labadlabad	PDP–Laban	86.88%
Zamboanga del Norte–3rd	Isagani Amatong	Liberal	Ian Amatong	Liberal	11.23%
Zamboanga del Sur–1st	Divina Grace Yu	PDP–Laban	Divina Grace Yu	PDP–Laban	11.12%
Zamboanga del Sur–2nd	Jun Babasa	Lakas	Victoria Yu	PDP–Laban	20.26%
Zamboanga Sibugay–1st	Wilter Palma II	Lakas	Wilter Palma	Lakas	19.30%
Zamboanga Sibugay–2nd	Dulce Ann Hofer	PDP–Laban	Antonieta Eudela	Lakas	0.81%

== Zamboanga City ==
=== 1st district ===
Incumbent Jawo Jimenez of the Nationalist People's Coalition retired to run for mayor of Zamboanga City.

Jimenez endorsed Zamboanga City mayor Beng Climaco of the Partido Prosperidad y Amor Para na Zamboanga, who was defeated by city councilor Khymer Adan Olaso of the Adelante Zamboanga Party. Four other candidates also ran for representative.

Candidate	Party	Votes	%
Khymer Adan Olaso	Adelante Zamboanga Party	73,785	49.43
Beng Climaco	Partido Prosperidad y Amor Para na Zamboanga	55,829	37.40
Wendell Sotto	Lakas–CMD	13,679	9.16
Al Alibasa	Independent	2,630	1.76
Taib Nasaron	Independent	1,896	1.27
Sisang Awis	Partido Federal ng Pilipinas	1,448	0.97
Total		149,267	100.00
Total votes		164,444	–
Registered voters/turnout		214,276	76.74
AZAP gain from NPC			
Source: Commission on Elections

=== 2nd district ===
Incumbent Mannix Dalipe of Lakas–CMD ran for a third term. He was previously affiliated with the Nationalist People's Coalition.

Dalipe won re-election against Zamboanga City Liga ng mga Barangay president Jerry Perez (Laban ng Demokratikong Pilipino), city councilor Kim Elago (Partido Prosperidad y Amor Para na Zamboanga) and two other candidates.

Candidate	Party	Votes	%
Mannix Dalipe (incumbent)	Lakas–CMD	88,784	53.99
Jerry Perez	Laban ng Demokratikong Pilipino	58,461	35.55
Kim Elago	Partido Prosperidad y Amor Para na Zamboanga	11,304	6.87
Mohammad Sali Ammang	Independent	4,526	2.75
Fictal Majuddin	Independent	1,382	0.84
Total		164,457	100.00
Total votes		180,227	–
Registered voters/turnout		230,964	78.03
Lakas hold			
Source: Commission on Elections

== Zamboanga del Norte ==
=== 1st district ===
Incumbent Jon-jon Jalosjos of the Nacionalista Party ran for a second term.

Jalosjos was defeated by former Polanco mayor Pinpin Uy of PDP–Laban. Two other candidates also ran as representative.

Candidate	Party	Votes	%
Pinpin Uy	PDP–Laban	69,591	48.19
Jon-jon Jalosjos (incumbent)	Nacionalista Party	69,109	47.86
Jan Jalosjos	National Unity Party	5,424	3.76
Richard Amazon	Partido Pederal ng Maharlika	288	0.20
Total		144,412	100.00
Total votes		157,923	–
Registered voters/turnout		180,551	87.47
PDP–Laban gain from Nacionalista			
Source: Commission on Elections

However, Uy's proclamation as the elected representative was suspended due to the nuisance candidacy of Jan Jalosjos (National Unity Party). Jan Jalosjos, whose real name is Federico Jalosjos, was disqualified by the Second Division of the Commission on Elections (COMELEC) on April 19, 2022. On June 7, the COMELEC decided to credit Jan Jalosjos' votes to Jon-jon Jalosjos, allowing the latter to be proclaimed as the elected representative.

Candidate	Party	Votes	%
Jon-jon Jalosjos (incumbent)	Nacionalista Party	74,533	51.61
Pinpin Uy	PDP–Laban	69,591	48.19
Richard Amazon	Partido Pederal ng Maharlika	288	0.20
Total		144,412	100.00
Total votes		157,923	–
Registered voters/turnout		180,551	87.47
Nacionalista hold			
Source: Commission on Elections, Rappler

However, on July 21, the Supreme Court unseated Jon-jon Jalosjos by issuing a status quo ante order.

On August 9, 2023, the Supreme Court invalidated Jalosjos' proclamation as the elected representative. On November 10, the COMELEC proclaimed Uy as the elected representative. Uy took office on November 13.

=== 2nd district ===
Incumbent Glona Labadlabad of PDP–Laban ran for a third term.

Labadlabad won re-election against Sonia Cabigon (Independent).

Candidate	Party	Votes	%
Glona Labadlabad (incumbent)	PDP–Laban	163,853	93.44
Sonia Cabigon	Independent	11,509	6.56
Total		175,362	100.00
Total votes		234,036	–
Registered voters/turnout		290,985	80.43
PDP–Laban hold			
Source: Commission on Elections

=== 3rd district ===
Incumbent Isagani Amatong of the Liberal Party was term-limited.

The Liberal Party nominated Amatong's son, Ian Amatong, who won the election against former representative Cesar Jalosjos (Nacionalista Party) and two other candidates.

Candidate	Party	Votes	%
Ian Amatong	Liberal Party	89,618	49.81
Cesar Jalosjos	Nacionalista Party	69,414	38.58
Ben Diamante	PROMDI	19,691	10.94
Moises Aballe Jr.	Independent	1,194	0.66
Total		179,917	100.00
Total votes		216,418	–
Registered voters/turnout		267,007	81.05
Liberal hold			
Source: Commission on Elections

== Zamboanga del Sur ==
=== 1st district ===
Incumbent Divina Grace Yu of PDP–Laban ran for a third term.

Yu won re-election against three other candidates.

Candidate	Party	Votes	%
Divina Grace Yu (incumbent)	PDP–Laban	166,432	52.89
Edmario Revelo	People's Reform Party	131,421	41.77
Archie Yongco	Nationalist People's Coalition	15,581	4.95
Dell Ceniza Supapo	Reform Party	1,223	0.39
Total		314,657	100.00
Total votes		353,711	–
Registered voters/turnout		415,735	85.08
PDP–Laban hold			
Source: Commission on Elections

=== 2nd district ===
Incumbent Jun Babasa of Lakas–CMD ran for a second term. He was previously affiliated with PDP–Laban.

Babasa was defeated by Victoria Yu of PDP–Laban. Former Zamboanga del Sur governor Antonio Cerilles (Nationalist People's Coalition) also ran for representative.

Candidate	Party	Votes	%
Victoria Yu	PDP–Laban	104,055	49.04
Jun Babasa (incumbent)	Lakas–CMD	61,073	28.78
Antonio Cerilles	Nationalist People's Coalition	47,065	22.18
Total		212,193	100.00
Total votes		231,361	–
Registered voters/turnout		277,350	83.42
PDP–Laban gain from Lakas			
Source: Commission on Elections

== Zamboanga Sibugay ==
=== 1st district ===
Incumbent Wilter Palma II of Lakas–CMD retired to run for governor of Zamboanga Sibugay. He was previously affiliated with PDP–Laban.

Lakas–CMD nominated Palma's father, Zamboanga Sibugay governor Wilter Palma, who won the election against Apple Cabilao Yambao (Partido Pilipino sa Pagbabago).

Candidate	Party	Votes	%
Wilter Palma	Lakas–CMD	77,268	59.65
Apple Cabilao Yambao	Partido Pilipino sa Pagbabago	52,269	40.35
Total		129,537	100.00
Total votes		144,095	–
Registered voters/turnout		176,027	81.86
PDP–Laban gain from Lakas			
Source: Commission on Elections

=== 2nd district ===
Term-limited incumbent Dulce Ann Hofer of PDP–Laban ran for governor of Zamboanga Sibugay.

Hofer endorsed her brother, Jet Hofer of the Nacionalista Party, who was defeated by Antonieta Eudela of Lakas–CMD. Former Zamboanga Sibugay vice governor Eldwin Alibutdan (Partido Pilipino sa Pagbabago) and Ramboy Bael (Independent) also ran for representative.

Candidate	Party	Votes	%
Antonieta Eudela	Lakas–CMD	79,703	46.29
Jet Hofer	Nacionalista Party	78,297	45.48
Eldwin Alibutdan	Partido Pilipino sa Pagbabago	13,182	7.66
Ramboy Bael	Independent	992	0.58
Total		172,174	100.00
Total votes		195,256	–
Registered voters/turnout		246,035	79.36
Lakas gain from PDP–Laban			
Source: Commission on Elections
