= DXKT =

DXKT may refer to:

- DXKT-AM, an AM radio station broadcasting in Davao City, branded as Radyo Ronda
- DXKT-FM, an FM radio station broadcasting in Titay, branded as Magic 103
