= List of implicated parties in the flood control projects scandal in the Philippines =

This list compiles individuals publicly implicated in the flood control projects scandal in the Philippines.

Below is a consolidated list of individuals publicly named in witness testimony, sworn statements, or investigative reports relating to alleged kickbacks in flood-control projects or potential conflicts of interest. Inclusion in this list does not imply guilt, and allegations may not have been proven in court.

== Executive department ==
=== Cabinet members and heads of agencies ===
Color key
- Mentioned as respondent
- Subject to travel restrictions
- Criminally charged

Picture	Name	Position / years	Office	Named by	Ref.
	Sonny Angara	Secretary of Education (2024–present); Senator (2013–2024)	Department of Education	Roberto Bernardo	
	Lucas Bersamin	Executive Secretary (2022–2025); Chief Justice (2018–2019)	Office of the Executive Secretary	Zaldy Co	
	Manuel Bonoan	Secretary of Public Works and Highways (2022–2025)	Department of Public Works and Highways	Panfilo Lacson, Roberto Bernardo	
	Terence Calatrava	Presidential Assistant for Visayas (2022–2025)	Office of the Presidential Assistant for Visayas	Discayas	
	Antonio Lagdameo Jr.	Special Assistant to the President (2022–present)	Office of the Special Assistant to the President	Maria Catalina Cabral	
	Amenah Pangandaman	Secretary of Budget and Management (2022–2025)	Department of Budget and Management	Zaldy Co	

=== Undersecretaries and other presidential appointees ===
Color key
- Mentioned as respondent
- Subject to travel restrictions
- Criminally charged

Picture	Name	Position / years	Office	Named by	Ref.
	Roberto Bernardo	Undersecretary of Public Works and Highways (2018–2025)	Department of Public Works and Highways	Self (sworn statement); Independent Commission for Infrastructure	Named Angara, Cajayon-Uy, Co, Revilla, Binay, Escudero, Estrada, Poe, Mark Villar, Trygve Olaivar, Mario Lipana, Bonoan, Robes
	Adrian Carlos Bersamin	Undersecretary of the Presidential Legislative Liaison Office (2025)	Presidential Legislative Liaison Office	Zaldy Co, Roberto Bernardo, Panfilo Lacson	
	Cathy Cabral	Undersecretary of Public Works and Highways (2018–2025)	Department of Public Works and Highways	Roberto Bernardo, Panfilo Lacson	
	Jojo Cadiz	Undersecretary of Justice (2025)	Department of Justice	Zaldy Co, Rappler	
	Maynard Ngu	Special Envoy of the Philippines to the People’s Republic of China for Trade, Investment and Tourism (2023–2025)	Office of the President of the Philippines	Roberto Bernardo	
	Trygve Olaivar	Undersecretary of Education (2024–2025)	Department of Education	Roberto Bernardo, Panfilo Lacson	

== Senate ==
Color key
- Mentioned as respondent
- Subject to travel restrictions
- Criminally charged

Picture	Name	Position / years	Office	Party	Named by	Ref.
	Bong Revilla	Senator (2004–2016; 2019–2025)	Senate	Lakas	Roberto Bernardo; Henry Alcantara; Brice Hernandez; Independent Commission for Infrastructure	
	Jinggoy Estrada	Senator (2004–2016; 2022–present)	Senate	PMP	Henry Alcantara; Brice Hernandez, Roberto Bernardo, Independent Commission for Infrastructure	
	Joel Villanueva	Senator (2016–present)	Senate	Independent	Henry Alcantara; Brice Hernandez; Independent Commission for Infrastructure	
	Nancy Binay	Senator (2013–2025), Mayor of Makati (2025–present)	Senate	UNA	Roberto Bernardo	
	Francis Escudero	Senator (2007–2019; 2022–present), Senate President (2024–2025), Governor of Sorsogon (2019–2022)	Senate	NPC	Roberto Bernardo	
	Bong Go	Senator (2019–present), Special Assistant to the President (2016–2018), Head of the Presidential Management Staff (2016–2018)	Senate	PDP	Jesus Crispin Remulla	
	Grace Poe	Senator (2013–2025), Chair of the Movie and Television Review and Classification Board (2010–2012)	Senate	Independent	Roberto Bernardo	
	Mark Villar	Senator (2022–present), Secretary of Public Works and Highways (2016–2021), Representative (2010–2016)	Senate	Nacionalista	Jesus Crispin Remulla; Roberto Bernardo	
	Cynthia Villar	Senator (2013–2025), Representative (2001–2010)	Senate	Nacionalista	Jesus Crispin Remulla	

== House of Representatives ==
Color key
- Mentioned as respondent
- Subject to travel restrictions
- Criminally charged

Picture	Name	Position / years	District / Party-List	Party	Named by	Ref.
	Martin Romualdez	Representative (2007–2016; 2019–present); Speaker of the House of Representatives (2022–2025)	Leyte–1st	Lakas	Orly Regala Guteza; Discayas; Francis Escudero, Zaldy Co, Independent Commission for Infrastructure, Philippine Center for Investigative Journalism	
	Sandro Marcos	Representative (2022–present)	Ilocos Norte–1st	PFP	Zaldy Co, Philippine Center for Investigative Journalism	
	Zaldy Co	Representative (2019–2025)	Partylist	Ako Bicol	Roberto Bernardo; Henry Alcantara; Brice Hernandez; Orly Regala Guteza; Discayas; Benjamin Magalong, Independent Commission for Infrastructure	
	Eric Yap	Representative (2019–present)	Benguet	Lakas	Orly Regala Guteza; Jesus Crispin Remulla	
	Edvic Yap	Representative (2022–2026)	Partylist	ACT-CIS	Department of Public Works and Highways, Discayas	
	Danny Domingo	Representative (2022–present)	Bulacan–1st	NUP	Brice Hernandez, Independent Commission for Infrastructure	
	Ambrosio C. Cruz Jr.	Representative (2022–2025)	Bulacan–5th	Lakas	Brice Hernandez	
	Edwin Gardiola	Representative (2022–present)	Partylist	CWS	Leandro Leviste, Independent Commission for Infrastructure	
	Jernie Nisay	Representative (2022–present)	Partylist	Pusong Pinoy	Independent Commission for Infrastructure	
	Tina Pancho	Representative (2022–present)	Bulacan–2nd	NUP	Brice Hernandez, Independent Commission for Infrastructure	
	Joseph Lara	Representative (2019–present)	Cagayan–3rd	Lakas	Independent Commission for Infrastructure	
	Francisco Matugas	Representative (2007–2016; 2025–present)	Surigao del Norte–1st	Lakas	Independent Commission for Infrastructure	
	Noel Rivera	Representative (2022–present)	Tarlac–3rd	NPC	Independent Commission for Infrastructure	
	Mitch Cajayon-Uy	Representative (2022–2025; 2007–2013)	Caloocan–2nd	Lakas	Henry Alcantara; Brice Hernandez, Roberto Bernardo, Independent Commission for Infrastructure	
	Roman Romulo	Representative (2007–2016; 2019–present)	Pasig	NPC	Discayas	
	Jojo Ang	Representative (2022–present)	Partylist	Uswag Ilonggo	Discayas, Independent Commission for Infrastructure	
	Patrick Michael Vargas	Representative (2022–present)	Quezon City–5th	Lakas	Discayas	
	Arjo Atayde	Representative (2022–present)	Quezon City–1st	Nacionalista	Discayas	
	Nicanor Briones	Representative (2022–present)	Partylist	AGAP	Discayas	
	Marcy Teodoro	Representative (2025–present), Mayor of Marikina (2016–2025)	Marikina–1st	NUP	Discayas	
	Florida Robes	Representative (2016–2025)	San Jose del Monte	PFP	Discayas	
	Eleandro Jesus Madrona	Representative (2019–present)	Romblon	Nacionalista	Discayas	
	Benjamin Agarao Jr.	Representative (2025–present)	Laguna–4th	PFP	Discayas	
	Bem Noel	Representative (2019–2023)	Partylist	An Waray	Discayas	
	Leody Tarriela	Representative (2022–president)	Occidental Mindoro	PFP	Discayas	
	Reynante Arrogancia	Representative (2022–present)	Quezon–3rd	NPC	Discayas	
	Marvin Rillo	Representative (2022–2025)	Quezon City–4th	Lakas	Discayas	
	Teodorico Haresco Jr.	Representative (2022–2025; 2010–2016)	Aklan–2nd	Nacionalista	Discayas	
	Antonieta Eudela	Representative (2022–2025)	Zamboanga Sibugay–2nd	Lakas	Discayas	
	Dean Asistio	Representative (2022–present)	Caloocan–3rd	Lakas	Discayas	
	Marivic Co-Pilar	Representative (2022–present)	Quezon City–6th	NUP	Discayas	

== Constitutional commissions ==
Color key
- Mentioned as respondent
- Subject to travel restrictions
- Criminally charged

Picture	Name	Position / years	Position	Named by	Ref.
	Mario G. Lipana	Commissioner on Audit (2022–present)	Commission on Audit	Roberto Bernardo; Henry Alcantara; Independent Commission for Infrastructure	

== Whistleblowers, contractors, and DPWH engineers ==
Color key
- Named as respondent
- Subject to travel restrictions
- Criminally charged

Picture	Name	Position / years	Position	Named by	Ref.
	Henry Alcantara	Former DPWH District Engineer (Bulacan 1st)	Department of Public Works and Highways	Self	Affidavit/testimony naming Revilla, Jinggoy Estrada, Joel Villanueva, Zaldy Co and Mario Lipana.
	Brice Ericson Hernandez	Former DPWH Assistant District Engineer (Bulacan 1st)	Department of Public Works and Highways	Self	Produced files and named Co, Revilla, Estrada, Villanueva.
	Jaypee Mendoza	Former DPWH engineer	Department of Public Works and Highways	Self	Corroborated accounts of irregularities and kickbacks.
	Sally Santos	Owner and General Manager of SYMS Construction Trading	Government Contractors	Self	Corroborated accounts of irregularities and kickbacks.
	Curlee and Sarah Discaya	St. Gerrard Construction General Contractor and Development Corp.; Alpha and Omega General Contractor And Development Corp.; St. Timothy Construction Corp.; Amethyst Horizon Builders and General Contractor and Development Corp.; St. Matthew General Contractor and Development Corp.; Great Pacific Builders and General Contractor Inc.; YPR General Contractor and Construction Supply Inc.; Way Maker OPC; Elite General Contractor And Development Corp.	Government Contractors	Self	Named ~18 House members and officials as linked to commissions/payoffs.
	Orly Regala Guteza	Former security aide to Representative Co	N/A	Self (testimony)	Named Romualdez, Co and Yap.
