= Universidad de Zamboanga =

Private university in Zamboanga del Sur, Philippines

Coordinates: 6.91920°N 122.08740°E

- Pamantasan ng Zamboanga
- Former name: Zamboanga A.E. Colleges (1948-2005)
- Motto: La Educacion es Libertad (Spanish)
- Motto in English: Education is Freedom
- Type: Private nonsectarian Research Non-profit Coeducational Secondary and Higher education institution
- Established: October 12, 1948; 77 years ago
- Founder: Engineer Arturo Francisco Eustaquio
- Academic affiliations: DepEd, CHED, TESDA and PACUCOA
- President: Abram M. Eustaquio
- Vice-president: Dr. Azenath M. Eustaquio (VP for Finance); Dr. Jo-Anne J. Bernardo (VP for Academic Affairs); Ronald S. Eustaquio (VP for Administration)
- Location: Don Toribio Street, Tetuan, Zamboanga City, Philippines
- Campus: Urban Main Barangay Tetuan, Zamboanga City Satellite Cabatangan, Pasonanca, Veterans, Gov. Alvarez St. Barangay Zone-III (High School), Barangay Tiguma, Pagadian City Zamboanga del Sur, Poblacion Ipil, Zamboanga Sibugay.
- Alma Mater song: UZ Hymn
- Colors: Green and White
- Mascot: Wildcat
- Website: uz.edu.ph

The Universidad de Zamboanga (often abbreviated to UZ) is a non-profit, private university founded in Zamboanga City, Philippines. Originally named the Zamboanga Arturo Eustaquio Colleges in 1948 in honor of its founder, it is the largest private university in the Zamboanga Peninsula in terms of the number of enrollments across all of its campuses. The university is owned and operated by the Eustaquio family, with 6 campuses within Zamboanga City and satellite campuses in Ipil and Pagadian. In 2012, the president of the university, Arturo F. Estaquio III, was shot and killed in Zamboanga.

== History ==
=== Founding ===
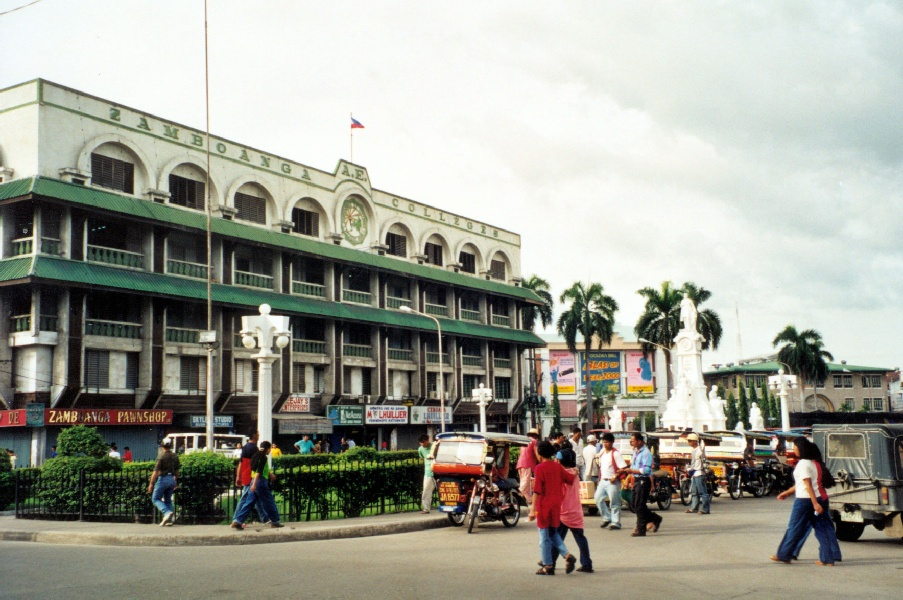
Zamboanga A.E. Colleges in the 90's

1948 - Engineer Arturo Francisco Eustaquio founded the Zamboanga Arturo Eustaquio Colleges (ZAEC), and opened its doors to 479 high school and college students. Classes were held at the former Mendoza Building, where Young Mart is now located.

- ZAEC initially offered a complete academic Secondary Course, Bachelor of Science in education (BSE), Liberal Arts (AB) and Bachelor of Science in commerce (BSC).

1949 - First High School graduation

- ZAEC's Complete Academic Secondary Course was given government recognition. There was a tremendous increase in enrollment and to accommodate the enrollees, ZAEC left the Mendoza Building and moved to its new home (its present location), the main campus in barangay Tetuan

1951 - Bachelor of Laws was offered and phased out in 1996.

1955 - Bachelor of Arts (AB) with majors in English, Filipino, History earned government recognition.

1956 - A one-year course in Pre-Nursing (up to the summer of '79) and Graduate Course in Education M.A. were offered, which lasted up to 1962 and were offered again in 1969. A one-year Secretarial course was initially offered.

1969 - Bachelor of Science in Civil Engineering (BSCE) and Bachelor of Science in Chemical Engineering (BSChe) were first offered.

1970 - Bachelor of Science in Medical Technology (BSMT) were first offered.

1974 - Bachelor of Science in Civil Engineering (BSCE) earned government recognition.

1975 - Bachelor of Science in Medical Technology (BSMT) earned government recognition.

- Master in Business Administration (MBA) was offered.

1976 - Bachelor of Science in Secretarial Administration (BSSA) and Bachelor of Science in criminology (BS Crim) were first offered.

1977 - Graduate course in Master of Arts in education (MA) was given government recognition. Masters in Public Administration (MPA) and Associate in Criminology were given government recognition.

1979 - Bachelor of Science in Chemical Engineering (BSCHE) and Master in Business Administration (MBA) earned government recognition.

- Bachelor of Science in Agriculture Technology (BAT) was first offered. Bachelor of Science in Secretarial Administration (BSSA) earned government recognition.
- Two-year course in Junior Secretarial Administration (BSSA) with majors in Computer Secretarial and Office Management earned government recognition.

1982 - Bachelor of Science in criminology (BS Criminology) earned government recognition.

1984 - Bachelor of Science in Agricultural Business (BSAB) was offered.

- Master in Public Administration (MPA) earned government recognition.

1990- Bachelor of Science in Accountancy (BSA) was first offered.

- Bachelor of Science in Agricultural Business (BSAB) earned government recognition.
- Bachelor of Science in Accountancy (BSA) earned government recognition.

1991 - Two-Year Course in Respiratory therapy and Three-Year Associate in Radiologic Technology were first offered.

- The ZAEC Community Medical Center opened its doors for the first time.
- ZAEC academic High School was converted to the ZAEC Technical High School.
- ZAEC Technical High School opened with an initial enrollment of 50 first year students. It emphasizes the teaching of technical skills to its students.
- Three-Year Associate in Radiologic Technology (ART) earned government Recognition.
- Dental Technology, Bachelor of Science in Computer Engineering (BSCOE) and Bachelor of Science in Electronics and Communications Engineering (BSECE) were offered.

1992 - Doctor in Education was offered.

- Bachelor of Science in Respiratory Therapy (BSRT) were first offered.
- Two-Year course in Respiratory Therapy earned government recognition.
- Bachelor of Science in Pharmacy was offered.
- Two-Year Dental Technology earned government recognition.

1995 - Master in Library Science was offered.

1997 - Master of Science in Criminology was first offered.

- ZAEC NetAccess partnered with Moscom Manila to be an Internet Provider in Zamboanga City.
- Bachelor of Science in Computer Engineering (BSCoE) earned government recognition.
- Bachelor of Science in Radiologic Technology was offered.
- Bachelor of Science in Pharmacy and Bachelor of Science in Radiologic Technology earned government recognition.
- Master of Science in Criminology earned government recognition.
- Bachelor of Science in Elementary Education earned government recognition.

1999 - The Summit Centre, a fully air conditioned multi-purpose sport arena with a seating capacity of 10,000 was inaugurated.

- Hosted the first PBA game held in Zamboanga City at the Summit Centre.

2000 - The Criminology Academy training ground in Cabatangan Campus was established.

- CISCO System, Inc. tie-up with ZAEC through the CISCO Networking Academy Program to develop highly skilled workforce

2002 - ZAEC extended its doors to more students in Mindanao by opening ZAEC Ipil—137 kilometers of Zamboanga City.

=== Universidad status (2005-present) ===
2005 - April 11, 2005, CHED grants ZAEC its University Status and changed its name to Universidad de Zamboanga.

2014 - UZ established another branch at Pagadian City in Barangay Tiguma to cater to the Zamboanga del Sur region. It offered three (3) of its flagship programs in Allied Medicine, namely; Bachelor of Science in Medical Technology, Bachelor of Science in nursing, and Bachelor of Science in pharmacy.

- April 23, 2014, the Department of Education provisional permit was granted for Universidad de Zamboanga to offer the program as a stand-alone Senior High School to include the Ipil Branch and the Technical High School.

2017 - Universidad de Zamboanga clinched the Hall of Famer Award for Energy Leadership - Tertiary Level. This prestigious award recognizes institutions that promote practices and initiatives in electrical safety, energy efficiency, and conservation.

== Campus life ==
The mascot of UZ is the Wildcat.
