= Roseller Lim, Zamboanga Sibugay =

Municipality in Zamboanga Sibugay, Philippines

Roseller Lim
- Municipality
- Municipality of Roseller Lim
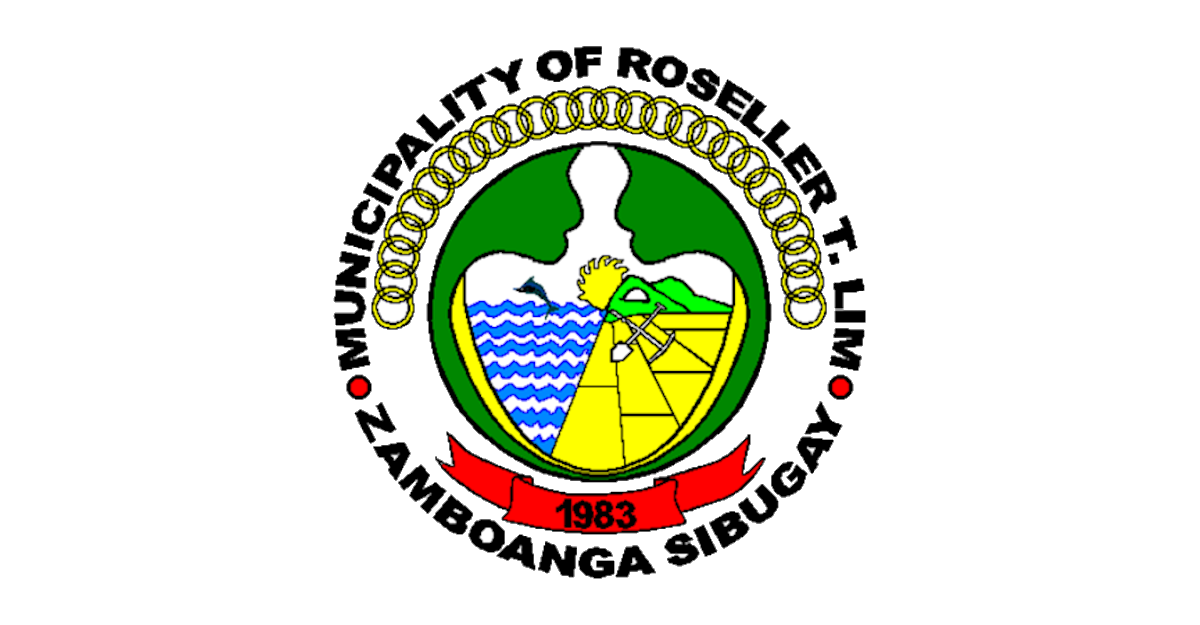
- Flag Seal

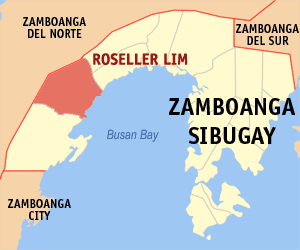
- Map of Zamboanga Sibugay with Roseller Lim highlighted
- Interactive map of Roseller Lim
- Location within the Philippines
- Coordinates: 7°39′30″N 122°27′50″E
- Country: Philippines
- Region: Zamboanga Peninsula
- Province: Zamboanga Sibugay
- District: 2nd district
- Named for: Roseller T. Lim
- Barangays: 26 (see Barangays)

Government
  - Type: Sangguniang Bayan
  - Mayor: Danilo J. Piodena
  - Vice Mayor: Michael A. Piodena
  - Representative: Dr. Marly T. Hofer-Hasim
  - Municipal Council: Members: Marilou P. Subibi; Reygene D. Inso; Rashida H. Loong; Rogelio A. Gomez; Lucio D. Cababat; Scarlett M. Velos; Arlie T. Calexterio; Perfecto J. Panes
  - Electorate: 28,873 voters (2025)

Area
  - Total: 300 km^{2} (120 sq mi)
- Elevation: 60 m (200 ft)
- Highest elevation: 570 m (1,870 ft)
- Lowest elevation: −3 m (−9.8 ft)

Population (2024 census)
  - Total: 44,735
  - Density: 150/km^{2} (390/sq mi)
  - Households: 11,162

Economy
  - Income class: 1st municipal income class
  - Poverty incidence: 21.03% (2023)
  - Revenue: ₱ 243.3 million (2024)
  - Assets: ₱ 674.8 million (2024)
  - Expenditure: ₱ 77.66 million (2024)
  - Liabilities: ₱ 74.43 million (2024)

Service provider
  - Electricity: Zamboanga del Sur 2 Electric Cooperative (ZAMSURECO 2)
- Time zone: UTC+8 (PST)
- ZIP code: 7002
- PSGC: 0908312000
- IDD : area code: +63 (0)62
- Native languages: Subanon; Cebuano; Chavacano; Tagalog
- Website: www.rtlimsibugay.gov.ph

Roseller Lim, officially the Municipality of Roseller T. Lim (Cebuano: Lungsod sa Roseller T. Lim; Subanon: Benwa Roseller T. Lim; Chavacano: Municipalidad de Roseller T. Lim; Tagalog: Bayan ng Roseller T. Lim), is a municipality in the province of Zamboanga Sibugay, Philippines. According to the 2024 census, it has a population of 44,735 people.

== History ==
The town is named in honor of the first Senator from Zamboanga, Roseller T. Lim.

The municipality, then in Zamboanga del Sur, was created as Roseller Lim through Batas Pambansa Blg. 183 which was approved on March 16, 1982; fourteen barangays in Ipil had been separated with Surabay designated the seat of government. A plebiscite for ratification, along with ten more newly-created local entities including Vincenzo Sagun (which remains in Zamboanga del Sur), was held on May 17, coinciding with the barangay elections.

== Geography ==
=== Barangays ===
Roseller Lim is politically subdivided into 26 barangays. Each barangay consists of puroks while some have sitios.

- Ali Alsree
- Balansag
- Calula
- Casacon
- Don Perfecto
- Gango
- Katipunan
- Kulambugan
- Mabini
- Magsaysay
- Malubal
- New Antique
- New Sagay
- Palmera
- Pres. Roxas
- Remedios
- San Antonio
- San Fernandino
- San Jose
- Santo Rosario
- Siawang
- Silingan
- Surabay
- Taruc
- Tilasan
- Tupilac

=== Climate ===
Climate data for Roseller Lim, Zamboanga Sibugay
Month	Jan	Feb	Mar	Apr	May	Jun	Jul	Aug	Sep	Oct	Nov	Dec	Year
Mean daily maximum °C (°F)	30 (86)	30 (86)	31 (88)	31 (88)	30 (86)	29 (84)	29 (84)	29 (84)	29 (84)	29 (84)	30 (86)	30 (86)	30 (86)
Mean daily minimum °C (°F)	23 (73)	23 (73)	23 (73)	25 (77)	25 (77)	25 (77)	24 (75)	24 (75)	24 (75)	24 (75)	24 (75)	23 (73)	24 (75)
Average precipitation mm (inches)	98 (3.9)	78 (3.1)	116 (4.6)	115 (4.5)	222 (8.7)	281 (11.1)	272 (10.7)	282 (11.1)	237 (9.3)	258 (10.2)	180 (7.1)	108 (4.3)	2,247 (88.6)
Average rainy days	19.6	18.6	21.8	22.9	29.0	28.6	28.7	28.3	27.0	28.6	25.9	22.1	301.1
Source: Meteoblue

== Demographics ==
Population census of Roseller Lim
Year	Pop.	±% p.a.
1990	29,325	—
1995	31,291	+1.22%
2000	34,152	+1.89%
2007	34,952	+0.32%
2010	37,216	+2.31%
2015	43,646	+3.08%
2020	43,575	−0.03%
2024	44,735	+0.63%
Source: Philippine Statistics Authority

=== Religion ===
- Roman Catholicism
- Baptism
- Islam
- Iglesia ni Cristo
- Alliance Church
- Grace Gospel Church of Christ
- New Hope
- The Bishop of the Dumaguete City Christian Fellowship Churches of the Philippines
- Members Church of God International (Ang Dating Daan)
- Jehovah’s Witnesses

== Economy ==
Poverty incidence of Roseller Lim (%)

Source: Philippine Statistics Authority

== Government ==
=== List of former chief executives ===
- Romeo Billote
- Camilo Bicoy
- Danilo Piodena
- Michael Piodena - Present

== Education ==
Roseller Lim has many elementary and high schools, as well as colleges.

=== Elementary ===
- Surabay Central Elementary School
- Surabay SPED
- Magsaysay Elementary School
- Kulambugan Elementary School
- Katipunan Elementary School
- Silingan Elementary School
- Tupilac Elementary School
- Malubal Elementary School
- San Jose Primary School
- Siawang Elementary School
- Taruc Elementary School
- Butalian Elementary School
- Guinabucan Elementary School
- Habib Ibrahim Memorial School

=== Secondary ===
- Surabay National High School (SNHS)
- Surabay National High School Senior High School Stand-Alone
- Malubal National High school (MNHS)
- Santo Rosario National High school (SrNHS)
- San Fernandino National High School (SFNHS)
- Gango National High School (GNHS)

=== Tertiary ===
- Western Sibugay College (WESCO)
- Western Mindanao Cooperative College-Annex (WMCC)
