= Surabay National High School =

Public high school in Zamboanga Sibugay, Philippines

Surabay National High School (Filipino: Mataas na Paaralan ng Surabay) is a DepEd senior high school located at Surabay, Roseller Lim, Zamboanga Sibugay in the Philippines. It is the largest national high school in Zamboanga Peninsula (designated as Region IX).

== History ==
Surabay National High School was established by the Department of Education of Philippines in 1969.
