= Antonieta Eudela =

Filipino politician and businesswoman (born 1969)

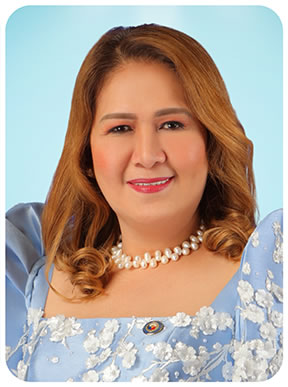
- Official portrait, 2022

Member of the Philippine House of Representatives from Zamboanga Sibugay's 2nd district
- In office June 30, 2022 – June 30, 2025
- Preceded by: Dulce Ann Hofer
- Succeeded by: Marly Hofer–Hasim

Personal details
- Born: July 6, 1969 (age 57) Tampilisan, Zamboanga del Norte, Philippines
- Party: Lakas (from 2021)
- Other political affiliations: PMP (2018–2021)
- Spouse: Lito Aniñon
- Children: 1
- Occupation: Politician, Businesswoman
- Nickname: Ate Tata

Antonieta "Ate Tata" Ramiso Eudela (born July 6, 1969) is a Filipina politician and businesswoman from the province of Zamboanga Sibugay in the Philippines. She recently served as the Representative for Zamboanga Sibugay's 2nd congressional district from 2022 to 2025.

== House of Representatives ==
=== Elections ===
Eudela unsuccessfully ran for the House of Representatives during the 2019 Elections representing Zamboanga Sibugay's 2nd congressional district under Pwersa ng Masang Pilipino, she lost to then incumbent representative, Dulce Ann Hofer of PDP-Laban. She ran again for the same post during the 2022 elections under Lakas–CMD and successfully defeated George "Jet" Hofer II of the Nacionalista Party. She ran for re-election in 2025, but was defeated by doctor and cousin of Hofer, Marly Hofer-Hasim of PFP, while her son, Nathaniel "Nat-Nat" Eudela won as Sangguniang Panlalawigan Member.

=== Tenure ===
==== Impeachment of Sara Duterte ====
Eudela was one of the 215 representatives who signed the Impeachment complaint of Sara Duterte on February 5, 2025, and one of the 41 representatives from Mindanao who signed for the impeachment. Eudela was one of the members of the House of Representatives during the 19th Congress who signed in favor of the impeachment

==== Flood control projects ====
In September 2025, Eudela was among the members of the House named by construction contractors Pacifico and Sarah Discaya in a Senate Blue Ribbon Committee hearing on alleged kickbacks from government flood-control projects. The Discayas alleged that Eudela and her husband, Tungawan Mayor Lito Aniñon, received as much as 25% in commissions from contracts coursed through their district. As of the latest reports, Eudela has not issued an official statement regarding these allegations.

== Electoral history ==
Electoral history of Antonieta Eudela
Year	Office	Party	Votes Eudela received				Result
Year	Office	Party	Total	%	P.	Swing	Result
2019	Representative (Zamboanga Sibugay-2nd)	PMP	58,572	37.70%	2nd	—N/a	Lost
2022	Representative (Zamboanga Sibugay-2nd)	Lakas	79,703	46.29%	1st	+8.59	Won
2025	Representative (Zamboanga Sibugay-2nd)	Lakas	71,823	37.87%	2nd	-8.42	Lost

== Personal life ==
Eudela was born on July 6, 1969, in Tampilisan, Zamboanga del Norte. She is the mother of Incumbent Zamboanga Sibugay 2nd District Sangguniang Panlalawigan Member, Nath Anthony "Nat-Nat" Eudela.

== See also ==
List of implicated parties in the flood control projects scandal in the Philippines
