= Kabasalan =

Municipality in Zamboanga Sibugay, Philippines

- Municipality
- Municipality of Kabasalan
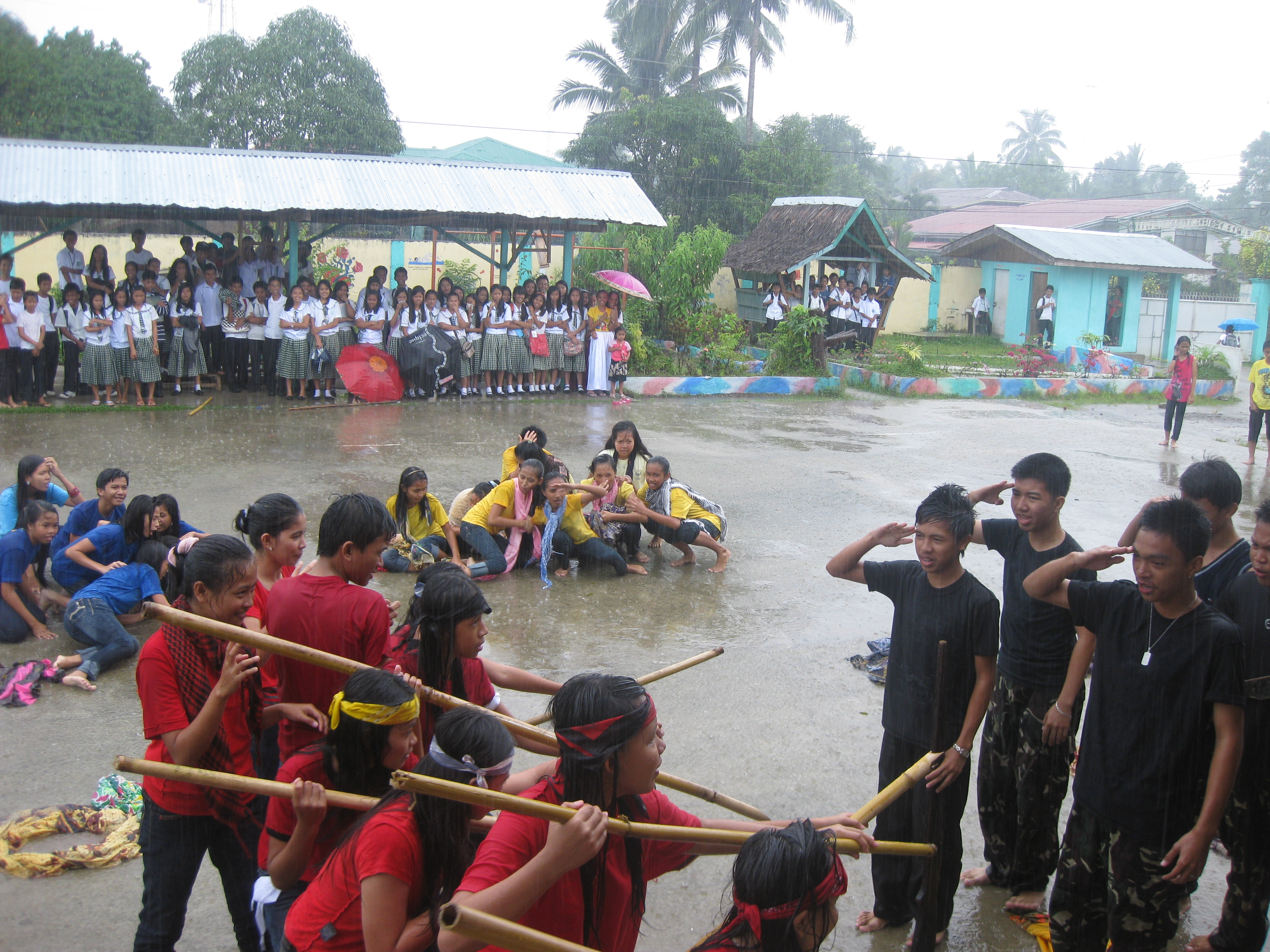
- Kabasalan Science and Technology High School, during the Buwan ng Wika celebration in 2011

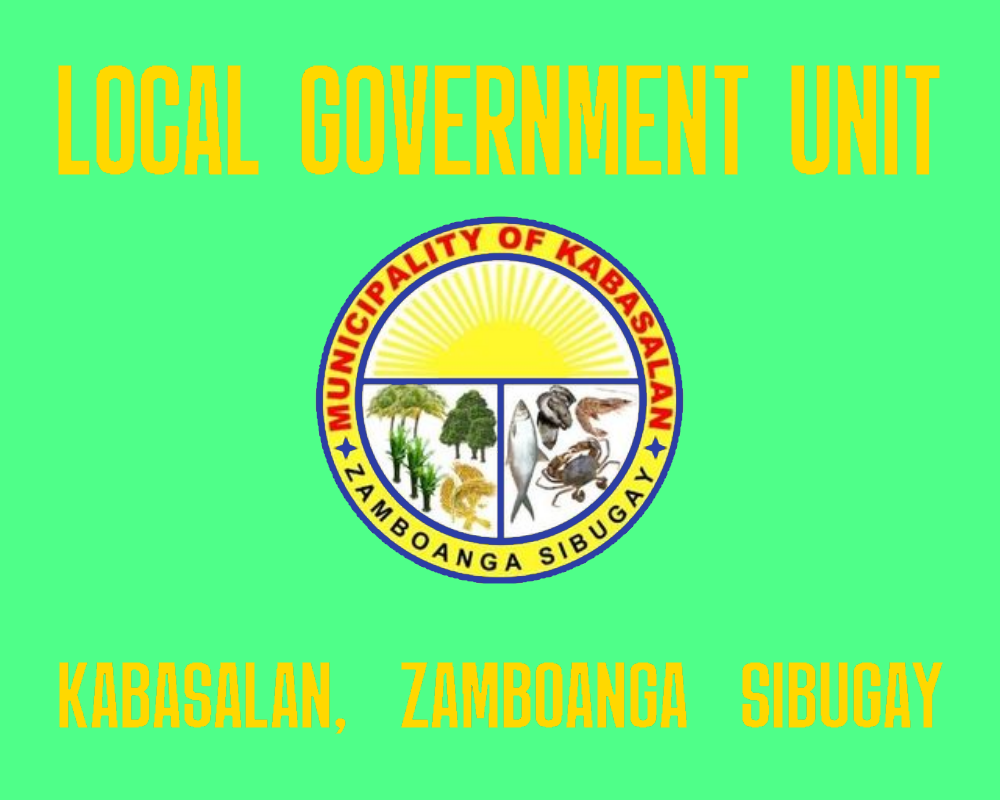
- Flag Seal
- Motto: Agri-Aqua Basin of Zambaoanga Sibugay
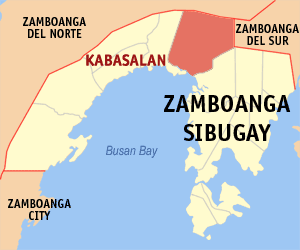
- Map of Zamboanga Sibugay with Kabasalan highlighted
- Interactive map of Kabasalan
- Location within the Philippines
- Coordinates: 7°47′48″N 122°45′46″E
- Country: Philippines
- Region: Zamboanga Peninsula
- Province: Zamboanga Sibugay
- District: 2nd district
- Founded: 1917
- Barangays: 29 (see Barangays)

Government
  - Type: Sangguniang Bayan
  - Mayor: Katrina Cainglet-Balladares
  - Vice Mayor: Isagani C. Balladares
  - Representative: Dr. Marly T. Hofer-Hasim
  - Municipal Council: Members: Freddie I. Chu; Benjamin C. Palanas Sr.; Eduardo P. Deita; Reymon C. Yao Cinco; Venus Helena P. Alcantara; Danny I. Chu; Elma S. Bragado; Edwin B. Morales Jr.
  - Electorate: 34,171 voters (2025)

Area
  - Total: 289.2 km^{2} (111.7 sq mi)
- Elevation: 38 m (125 ft)
- Highest elevation: 367 m (1,204 ft)
- Lowest elevation: −3 m (−9.8 ft)

Population (2024 census)
  - Total: 48,366
  - Density: 167.2/km^{2} (433.2/sq mi)
  - Households: 10,268

Economy
  - Income class: 1st municipal income class
  - Poverty incidence: 23.84% (2023)
  - Revenue: ₱ 250.6 million (2024)
  - Assets: ₱ 836.6 million (2024)
  - Expenditure: ₱ 71.88 million (2024)
  - Liabilities: ₱ 243.2 million (2024)

Service provider
  - Electricity: Zamboanga del Sur 2 Electric Cooperative (ZAMSURECO 2)
- Time zone: UTC+8 (PST)
- ZIP code: 7005
- PSGC: 0908306000
- IDD : area code: +63 (0)62
- Native languages: Subanon; Cebuano; Chavacano; Tagalog
- Website: www.kabasalansibugay.gov.ph

Kabasalan, officially the Municipality of Kabasalan (Cebuano: Lungsod sa Kabasalan; Chavacano: Municipalidad de Kabasalan; Tagalog: Bayan ng Kabasalan), is a municipality in the province of Zamboanga Sibugay, Philippines. According to the 2024 census, it has a population of 48,366 people.

== History ==
The first inhabitants of the place are of Subanen origin. Kabasalan comes from the word basal, meaning to play the agung, a musical instrument which is a favorite pastime of the Subanon. It was during the old times that the whole peninsula was resonating with the sound of that instrument.

In 1956, Siay was established, as twenty-six barrios and sitios, including Barrio Siay which would be the seat of government in the newly created municipality, had been separated from Kabasalan, along with parts of Malangas.

Kabasalan was greatly affected by Typhoon Tembin (2017) which most of the municipality where flooded. Schools were destroyed due to strong winds.

== Geography ==
=== Barangays ===
Kabasalan is politically subdivided into 29 barangays. Each barangay consists of puroks while some have sitios.

- Banker
- Buayan
- Cainglet
- Calapan
- Calubihan (F.L.Pena)
- Canacan (Bolo Battalion)
- Concepcion (Balungis)
- Diampak
- Dipala
- Gacbusan
- Goodyear
- Lacnapan
- Little Baguio
- Lumbayao
- Nazareth
- Palinta
- Peñaranda
- Poblacion
- Salipyasin (Riverside)
- Sanghanan
- Santa Cruz
- Sayao
- Shiolan
- Simbol
- Sininan
- Tamin
- Tampilisan
- Tigbangagan
- Timuay Danda (Mangahas)

=== Climate ===
Climate data for Kabasalan, Zamboanga Sibugay
Month	Jan	Feb	Mar	Apr	May	Jun	Jul	Aug	Sep	Oct	Nov	Dec	Year
Mean daily maximum °C (°F)	31 (88)	31 (88)	32 (90)	31 (88)	30 (86)	29 (84)	29 (84)	29 (84)	29 (84)	29 (84)	30 (86)	30 (86)	30 (86)
Mean daily minimum °C (°F)	23 (73)	23 (73)	24 (75)	25 (77)	25 (77)	25 (77)	24 (75)	24 (75)	24 (75)	24 (75)	24 (75)	23 (73)	24 (75)
Average precipitation mm (inches)	61 (2.4)	55 (2.2)	75 (3.0)	81 (3.2)	145 (5.7)	189 (7.4)	189 (7.4)	197 (7.8)	162 (6.4)	181 (7.1)	115 (4.5)	70 (2.8)	1,520 (59.9)
Average rainy days	16.4	15.7	19.1	21.5	26.9	27.1	26.4	25.0	24.2	26.8	23.5	18.7	271.3
Source: Meteoblue

== Demographics ==
Population census of Kabasalan
Year	Pop.	±% p.a.
1918	9,843	—
1939	15,882	+2.30%
1948	19,037	+2.03%
1960	19,920	+0.38%
1970	15,304	−2.60%
1975	19,175	+4.63%
1980	24,658	+5.16%
1990	32,323	+2.74%
1995	34,483	+1.22%
2000	37,619	+1.88%
2007	40,169	+0.91%
2010	41,421	+1.12%
2015	44,336	+1.30%
2020	46,884	+1.18%
2024	48,366	+0.75%
Source: Philippine Statistics Authority

== Economy ==
Poverty incidence of Kabasalan (%)

Source: Philippine Statistics Authority

== Government ==
=== Elected officials ===
Kabasalan Municipal Council (2025 - 2028)
Position	Name	Party
Congresswoman	Marly Hofer–Hasim	PFP
Mayor	Katrina C. Balladares	PFP
Vice Mayor	Isagani "Gani" C. Balladares	PFP
Councilors	Ariel "Ardag" M. Dagohoy	PFP
Councilors	Mitchell V. Simbol	PFP
Councilors	Benjamin C. Palanas Sr.	PFP
Councilors	Reymon "Idol Mao" C. Yao Cinco	PFP
Councilors	Mobin A. Edres	PFP
Councilors	Aldrin "Al" O. Usman	PFP
Councilors	Freddie I. Chu	Independent
Councilors	Danny I. Chu	Lakas

== Media ==
Kabasalan and its neighboring towns is being served by Flash-FM 91.3 MHz and Countryside Cable Television, Inc.
