= Ipil, Zamboanga Sibugay =

Municipality in Zamboanga Sibugay, Philippines

Ipil
- Municipality
- Municipality of Ipil
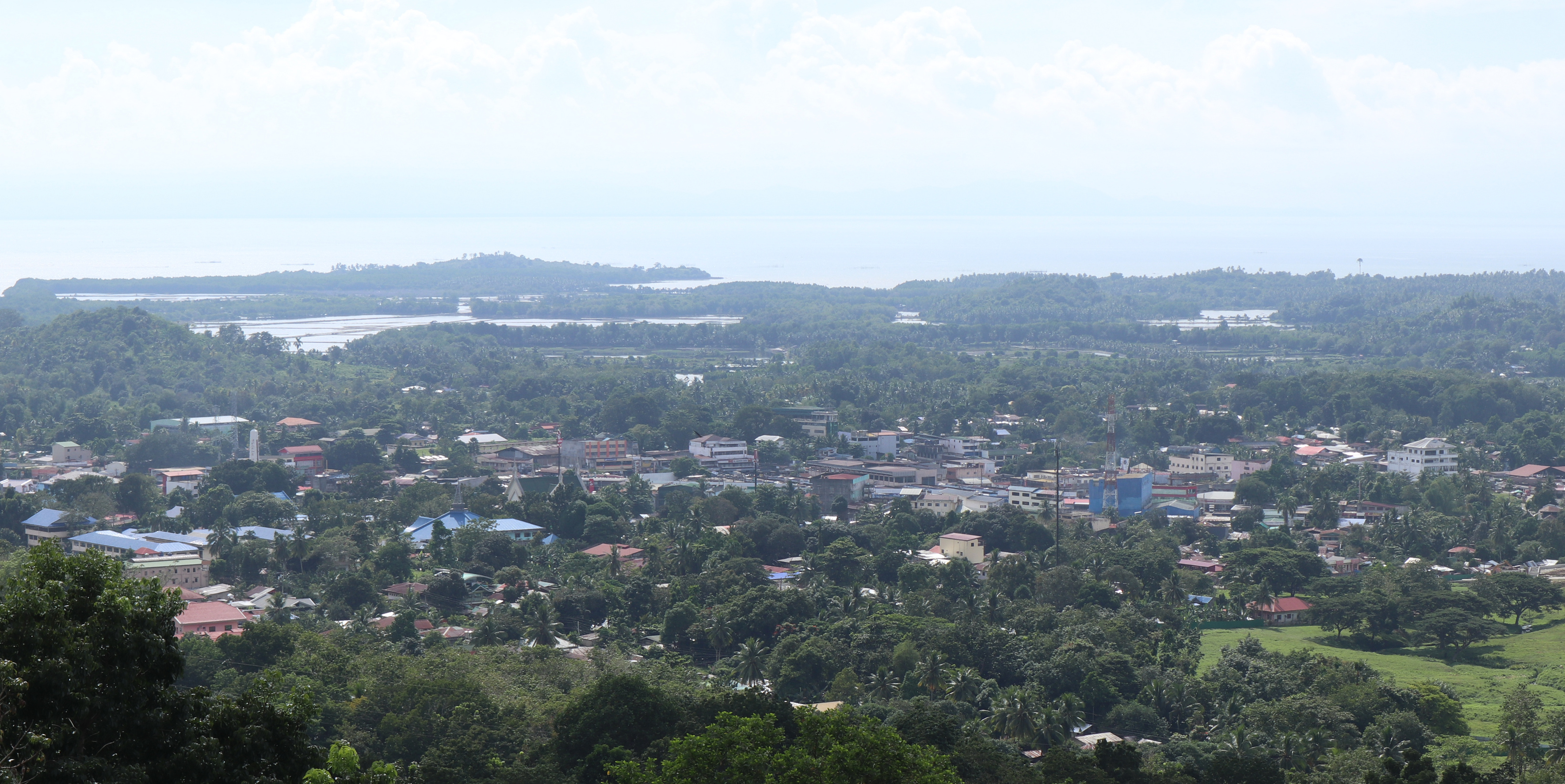
- Skyline Rotunda Obelisk Zamboanga Sibugay Provincial Capitol

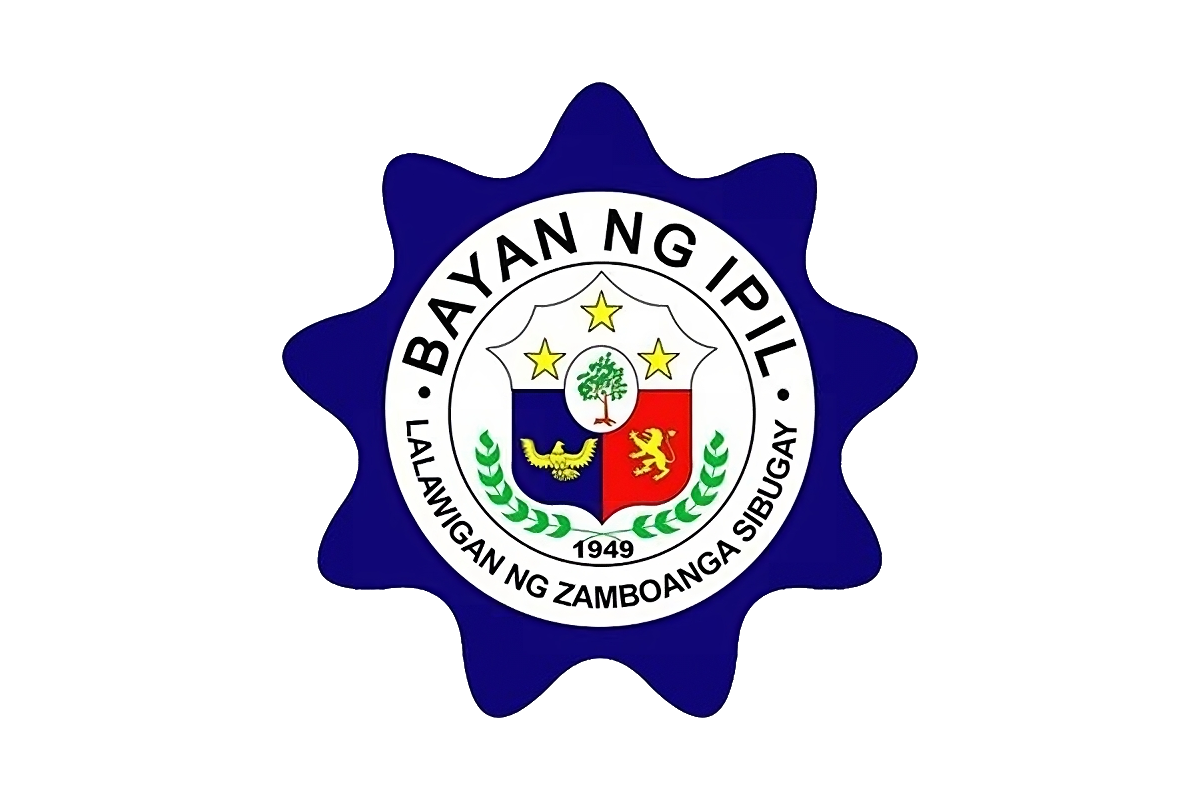
- Flag Seal
- Nicknames: Heart of Sibugay; Crossroads of Region IX
- Motto(s): Ipil: Our place, our responsibility, our pride!
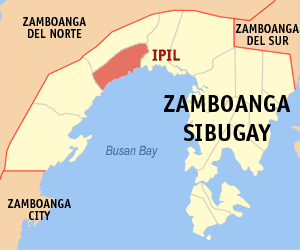
- Map of Zamboanga Sibugay with Ipil highlighted
- Interactive map of Ipil
- Location within the Philippines
- Coordinates: 7°46′56″N 122°35′12″E
- Country: Philippines
- Region: Zamboanga Peninsula
- Province: Zamboanga Sibugay
- District: 2nd district
- Founded: July 26, 1949
- Barangays: 28 (see Barangays)

Government
  - Type: Sangguniang Bayan
  - Mayor: Ramses Troy D. Olegario
  - Vice Mayor: Anamel C. Olegario
  - Representative: Dr. Marly T. Hofer-Hasim
  - Municipal Council: Members: Ian Sabijon; Eric Alibutdan; Elias Dangpalan; Dianne L. Cataluña; Albert Alcoriza; Janelle Bordner; Sharif Mazin Hasim; Joel Ebol
  - Electorate: 60,353 voters (2025)

Area
  - Total: 241.60 km^{2} (93.28 sq mi)
- Elevation: 27 m (89 ft)
- Highest elevation: 185 m (607 ft)
- Lowest elevation: −2 m (−6.6 ft)

Population (2024 census)
  - Total: 96,363
  - Density: 398.85/km^{2} (1,033.0/sq mi)
  - Households: 21,548

Economy
  - Income class: 1st municipal income class
  - Poverty incidence: 13.25% (2023)
  - Revenue: ₱ 447.4 million (2024)
  - Assets: ₱ 1,459 million (2024)
  - Expenditure: ₱ 186.9 million (2024)
  - Liabilities: ₱ 388.2 million (2024)

Service provider
  - Electricity: Zamboanga del Sur 2 Electric Cooperative (ZAMSURECO 2)
  - Water: Ipil-Titay Water District (ITWD)
- Time zone: UTC+8 (PST)
- ZIP code: 7001
- PSGC: 0908305000
- IDD : area code: +63 (0)62
- Native languages: Subanon; Cebuano; Chavacano; Tagalog; Maguindanaon

Ipil (/ˈiːpiːl/ EE-peel), officially the Municipality of Ipil (Cebuano: Lungsod sa Ipil; Maguindanaon: Inged nu Ipil, Jawi: ايڠد نو ايڤل; Chavacano: Municipalidad de Ipil; Tagalog: Bayan ng Ipil), is a municipality and capital of the province of Zamboanga Sibugay, Philippines. According to the 2024 census, it has a population of 96,363 people. Ipil is the most populous municipality of Zamboanga Sibugay, and the second most populous in Region IX after Sindangan.

The town hosts its only airport in the province, Ipil Airport located at Barangay Sanito, along the Pan Philippine Highway. Its large income and population makes it a major commercial and economic center in Zamboanga Sibugay.

== History ==
Ipil used to be known as Sanito, a place under barrio Bacalan under the Municipality of Kabasalan. It was a swampy area and a docking spot for pioneering Ilocanos who settled in the upper areas of Titay. Ipil was a jumping point for their lantsa sailing to Zamboanga City. The first mayor of Ipil was Gregorio Dar, an Ilocano who came from Titay. The Dar Family were the second batch of Ilocanos who settled upon the invitation of Mariano Families who are among the first batch of Ilocanos from Luzon. When Sanito became a Town in 1949, its name was changed to Ipil, as there were many Ipil trees found within the said locale.

The territory was further reduced when, through Batas Pambansa Blg. 183 of 1982, fourteen barangays were separated to create the municipality of Roseller Lim.

=== Early Ilocano routes ===
The first Ilocanos used Ipil as the nearest jump point in connecting Titay with Zamboanga City. They would walk via Lumbia then to Longilog then Gabo reaching Mayabang their original settlement. It was this route that they do not have to cross the rivers as it is uphill. It was the Ilocanos who first set foot on these areas. Mayabang came from the first Tagalog settlers who intermarried with the first ilocano settlers of the place.

=== Ipil massacre ===
On the morning of April 4, 1995, Ipil was attacked by approximately 200 heavily armed Abu Sayyaf militants who fired upon residents, strafed civilian homes, plundered banks, took up to 30 hostages and then burned the centre of the town to the ground.

The militants allegedly arrived in the town by boat and bus, and a number of them had been dressed in military clothing.

The town's Chief of Police was reportedly killed in the attack and close to a billion pesos were looted from eight commercial banks. Army commandos pursued some rebel gunmen in nearby mountains while officials said that the rebels were looting farms and seizing civilians as "human shields" as they fled the town of about 40 rebels, who may have taken hostages, were cornered in a school compound west of Ipil on April 6 when an elite army unit attacked. In the fighting that followed, the television station GMA reported, 11 civilians were killed.

== Geography ==
Ipil is located three hours from the key cities in the region (Dipolog, Pagadian and Zamboanga City). The Ipil seaport is 4 kilometres (2 mi) south of the town center.

=== Barangays ===
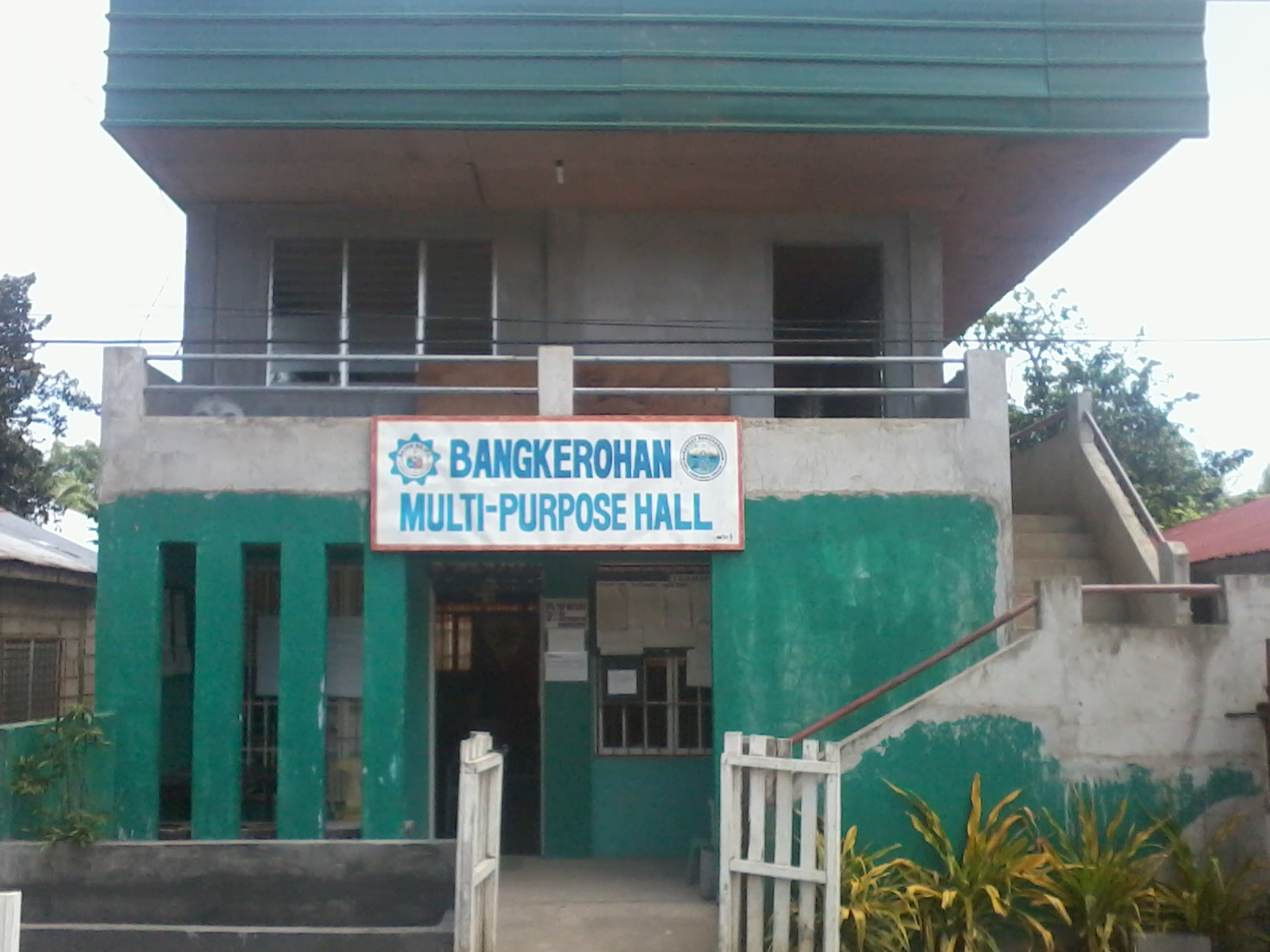
Barangay hall of Barangay Bangkerohan

Ipil is subdivided into 28 barangays. Each barangay consists of puroks while some have sitios.

- Bacalan
- Bangkerohan
- Buluan
- Caparan
- Domandan
- Don Andres
- Doña Josefa
- Guituan
- Ipil Heights
- Labe
- Logan
- Tirso Babiera (Lower Ipil Heights)
- Lower Taway
- Lumbia
- Maasin
- Magdaup
- Makilas
- Pangi
- Poblacion
- Sanito
- Suclema
- Taway
- Tenan
- Tiayon
- Timalang
- Tomitom
- Upper Pangi
- Veteran's Village

=== Climate ===
Climate data for Ipil, Zamboanga Sibugay
Month	Jan	Feb	Mar	Apr	May	Jun	Jul	Aug	Sep	Oct	Nov	Dec	Year
Mean daily maximum °C (°F)	31 (88)	31 (88)	31 (88)	31 (88)	30 (86)	29 (84)	29 (84)	29 (84)	29 (84)	29 (84)	30 (86)	30 (86)	30 (86)
Mean daily minimum °C (°F)	23 (73)	23 (73)	24 (75)	24 (75)	25 (77)	25 (77)	24 (75)	24 (75)	24 (75)	24 (75)	24 (75)	23 (73)	24 (75)
Average precipitation mm (inches)	61 (2.4)	55 (2.2)	75 (3.0)	81 (3.2)	145 (5.7)	189 (7.4)	189 (7.4)	197 (7.8)	162 (6.4)	181 (7.1)	115 (4.5)	70 (2.8)	1,520 (59.9)
Average rainy days	16.4	15.7	19.1	21.5	26.9	27.1	26.4	25.0	24.2	26.8	23.5	18.7	271.3
Source: Meteoblue (modeled/calculated data, not measured locally)

== Demographics ==
Population census of Ipil

Year	Pop.	±% p.a.
1960	21,141	—
1970	32,478	+4.38%
1975	35,798	+1.97%
1980	43,540	+3.99%
1990	43,031	−0.12%
1995	43,991	+0.41%

Year	Pop.	±% p.a.
2000	52,481	+3.86%
2007	60,686	+2.02%
2010	64,939	+2.50%
2015	74,656	+2.69%
2020	89,401	+3.87%
2024	96,363	+1.82%

Source: Philippine Statistics Authority

== Economy ==
Poverty incidence of Ipil (%)

Source: Philippine Statistics Authority

Ipil is a significant commercial and investment center in the Zamboanga Peninsula region. Due to its central location, Ipil is considered the region's logistics and distribution hub. The town also attracts many domestic tourists within its region. Many businesses, regional and national, have set their foot in the town. This includes Budgetwise Shopping Center and Cecile's Pharmacy, both businesses tracing its roots to nearby Zamboanga City, and Gaisano Grand Malls, which has opened its first mall in the region, Gaisano Grand Ipil.

== Government ==
Ipil Municipal Hall

=== List of former and current chief executives ===
- Merjuar
- Joaquin Funda (1956 - 1959)
- Generoso Sucgang (1960 - 1967)
- Col Escalona
- Andres P. Olegario (1972 – 1986)
- Henry de Villa (1986 – 1988)
- José Fontanoza (1988 – 1992)
- Francisco Q. Pontanar (1992 – 1998)
- Rey Andre C. Olegario (1998 – 2007)
- Eldwin M. Alibutdan (2007 – 2016)
- Anamel C. Olegario (2016 – 2025)
- Ramses Troy "Rambo" D. Olegario (2025 – Present)

=== Elected officials ===
Ipil Municipal Council (2025 - 2028)
Position	Name	Party
Congresswoman	Marly Hofer–Hasim	PFP
Mayor	Ramses Troy "Rambo" D. Olegario	PFP
Vice Mayor	Anamel "Inday Amy" C. Olegario	Lakas
Councilors	Glenn Ian Y. Sabijon	NP
Councilors	Sharif Mazin A. Hasim	PFP
Councilors	Dianne L. Cataluña	PFP
Councilors	Iric M. Alibutdan	PFP
Councilors	Janelle F. Bordner	PFP
Councilors	Elias S. Dangpalan	PDP
Councilors	Joel D. Ebol	Lakas
Councilors	Alberto "Jong" A. Alcoriza Jr.	PFP

== Healthcare ==
- Zamboanga Sibugay Provincial Hospital
- Dr. Henry De Villa Memorial Hospital
- Dr. M. Simon Hospital
- Ipil Doctors Hospital

== Media ==
=== Radio stations ===
==== AM ====
- DXUZ 1035 Radyo Lipay (Universidad de Zamboanga)

==== FM ====
- 88.7 Radyo Bisdak (Times Broadcasting Network Corporation)
- 92.7 XFM (XFM (Philippines)
- 94.3 Infinite Radio (St. Jude Thaddeus Institute of Technology)
- 95.3 Radyo Natin (Manila Broadcasting Company/Radyo Natin Network)
- 96.5 DABIG C Radio (Prime Broadcasting Network)
- 99.3 FM Radio Zamboanga Sibugay (Philippine Collective Media Corporation)
- 100.1 Juander Radyo (Capitol Broadcasting Center)
- 100.9 Brigada News FM (Brigada Mass Media Corporation)
- Magic 103.1 (EMedia Productions)

=== Cable and Satellite TV ===
- Ipil Cable TV
- Cignal Digital TV
- G Sat Direct TV

=== Newspapers ===
- Zamboanga Sibugay Tribune
- The Sibugay Express
