= Naga, Zamboanga Sibugay =

Municipality in Zamboanga Sibugay, Philippines

Naga
- Municipality
- Municipality of Naga
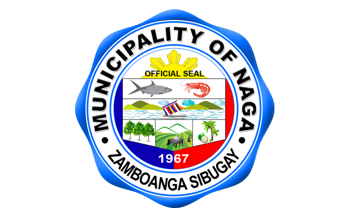
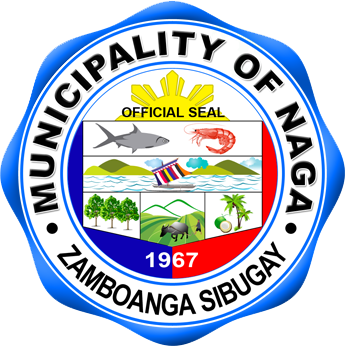
- Flag Seal

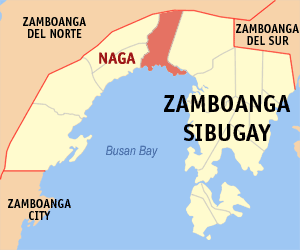
- Map of Zamboanga Sibugay with Naga highlighted
- Interactive map of Naga
- Location within the Philippines
- Coordinates: 7°47′52″N 122°41′40″E
- Country: Philippines
- Region: Zamboanga Peninsula
- Province: Zamboanga Sibugay
- District: 2nd district
- Barangays: 23 (see Barangays)

Government
  - Type: Sangguniang Bayan
  - Mayor: Rino O. De Los Reyes
  - Vice Mayor: Romeo P. Pantag
  - Representative: Dr. Marly T. Hofer-Hasim
  - Municipal Council: Members: Helen A. Sandagon; Moammar M. Jana; Junito H. Garcia; Jing A. Baloyo; Ambri J. Atab; Herminio O. Sale; Ganase M. Almada; Jingle Q. Espinosa
  - Electorate: 28,194 voters (2025)

Area
  - Total: 246.30 km^{2} (95.10 sq mi)
- Elevation: 27 m (89 ft)
- Highest elevation: 266 m (873 ft)
- Lowest elevation: −2 m (−6.6 ft)

Population (2024 census)
  - Total: 42,270
  - Density: 171.6/km^{2} (444.5/sq mi)
  - Households: 9,235

Economy
  - Income class: 1st municipal income class
  - Poverty incidence: 28.44% (2023)
  - Revenue: ₱ 216.1 million (2024)
  - Assets: ₱ 549.4 million (2024)
  - Expenditure: ₱ 81.35 million (2024)
  - Liabilities: ₱ 140.7 million (2024)

Service provider
  - Electricity: Zamboanga del Sur 2 Electric Cooperative (ZAMSURECO 2)
- Time zone: UTC+8 (PST)
- ZIP code: 7004
- PSGC: 0908309000
- IDD : area code: +63 (0)62
- Native languages: Subanon; Cebuano; Chavacano; Tagalog
- Website: www.nagasibugay.gov.ph

Naga, officially the Municipality of Naga (Cebuano: Lungsod sa Naga; Chavacano: Municipalidad de Naga; Tagalog: Bayan ng Naga), is a municipality in the province of Zamboanga Sibugay, Philippines. According to the 2024 census, it has a population of 42,270 people.

== Geography ==
=== Barangays ===
Naga is politically subdivided into 23 barangays. Each barangay consists of puroks while some have sitios.

- Aguinaldo
- Baga
- Baluno
- Bangkaw-bangkaw
- Cabong
- Crossing Santa Clara
- Gubawang
- Guintoloan
- Kaliantana
- La Paz
- Lower Sulitan
- Mamagon
- Marsolo
- Poblacion
- San Isidro
- Sandayong
- Santa Clara
- Sulo
- Tambanan
- Taytay Manubo
- Tilubog
- Tipan
- Upper Sulitan

=== Climate ===
Climate data for Naga, Zamboanga Sibugay
Month	Jan	Feb	Mar	Apr	May	Jun	Jul	Aug	Sep	Oct	Nov	Dec	Year
Mean daily maximum °C (°F)	31 (88)	31 (88)	31 (88)	31 (88)	30 (86)	29 (84)	29 (84)	29 (84)	29 (84)	29 (84)	30 (86)	30 (86)	30 (86)
Mean daily minimum °C (°F)	23 (73)	23 (73)	23 (73)	24 (75)	25 (77)	25 (77)	24 (75)	24 (75)	24 (75)	24 (75)	24 (75)	23 (73)	24 (75)
Average precipitation mm (inches)	61 (2.4)	55 (2.2)	75 (3.0)	81 (3.2)	145 (5.7)	189 (7.4)	189 (7.4)	197 (7.8)	162 (6.4)	181 (7.1)	115 (4.5)	70 (2.8)	1,520 (59.9)
Average rainy days	16.4	15.7	19.1	21.5	26.9	27.1	26.4	25.0	24.2	26.8	23.5	18.7	271.3
Source: Meteoblue

== Demographics ==
Population census of Naga

Year	Pop.	±% p.a.
1970	20,591	—
1975	24,162	+3.26%
1980	24,209	+0.04%
1990	31,582	+2.69%
1995	31,421	−0.10%
2000	35,176	+2.45%

Year	Pop.	±% p.a.
2007	37,349	+0.83%
2010	37,814	+0.45%
2015	38,547	+0.37%
2020	41,743	+1.69%
2024	42,270	+0.30%

Source: Philippine Statistics Authority

== Economy ==
Poverty incidence of Naga (%)

Source: Philippine Statistics Authority
