= Tungawan =

Municipality in The Province of Zamboanga Sibugay, Philippines

- Municipality
- Municipality of Tungawan
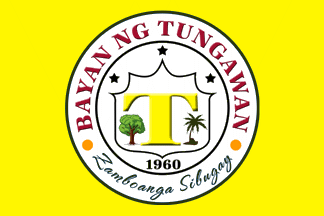
- Flag Seal

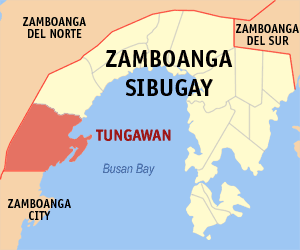
- Map of Zamboanga Sibugay with Tungawan highlighted
- Interactive map of Tungawan
- Location within the Philippines
- Coordinates: 7°36′17″N 122°25′22″E
- Country: Philippines
- Region: Zamboanga Peninsula
- Province: Zamboanga Sibugay
- District: 2nd district
- Founded: May 24, 1960
- Barangays: 25 (see Barangays)

Government
  - Type: Sangguniang Bayan
  - Mayor: Carlnan C. Climaco
  - Vice Mayor: Ivan N. Balano
  - Representative: Dr. Marly T. Hofer-Hasim
  - Municipal Council: Members: Rosalie E. Climaco; Lorverle S. Caracol; Allan E. Mangubat; Ruben M. Abdilla; Maximo L. Medado; Arvie G. Arcillas; Benzar Q. Abison; Muin S. Basa
  - Electorate: 34,367 voters (2025)

Area
  - Total: 473.28 km^{2} (182.73 sq mi)
- Highest elevation: 180 m (590 ft)
- Lowest elevation: −2 m (−6.6 ft)

Population (2024 census)
  - Total: 48,013
  - Density: 101.45/km^{2} (262.75/sq mi)
  - Households: 10,523

Economy
  - Income class: 1st municipal income class
  - Poverty incidence: 27.67% (2023)
  - Revenue: ₱ 316.7 million (2024)
  - Assets: ₱ 649.2 million (2024)
  - Expenditure: ₱ 133.6 million (2024)
  - Liabilities: ₱ 195.2 million (2024)

Service provider
  - Electricity: Zamboanga del Sur 2 Electric Cooperative (ZAMSURECO 2)
- Time zone: UTC+8 (PST)
- ZIP code: 7018
- PSGC: 0908316000
- IDD : area code: +63 (0)62
- Native languages: Subanon; Cebuano; Chavacano; Tagalog; Tausug; Sama
- Website: www.tungawansibugay.gov.ph

Tungawan, officially the Municipality of Tungawan (Cebuano: Lungsod sa Tungawan; Subanon: Benwa Tungawan; Chavacano: Municipalidad de Tungawan; Tausūg: Kawman sin Tungawan; Tagalog: Bayan ng Tungawan), is a municipality in the province of Zamboanga Sibugay, Philippines. According to the 2024 census, it has a population of 48,013 people.

It has an area of 47,328 hectares (116,950 acres) of land, the largest in the province, as well as 15,236 hectares (37,650 acres) of coastal waters.

It was declared as a municipality on May 24, 1960, and started functioning as a Local Government Unit (LGU) on January 29, 1961, by virtue of Executive Order No. 395. Its name was coined from the minute leech generally known as tungaw of the Hirudo family.

Tungawan's economy is primarily based on agriculture, producing rubber, coconut, corn, rice, and seaweeds. It is home to the 880 hectares Bangaan Marine Sanctuary at Barangays Linguisan and Tigbucay.

== Geography ==
=== Barangays ===
Tungawan is politically subdivided into 25 barangays. Each barangay consists of puroks while some have sitios.

- Baluran
- Batungan
- Cayamcam
- Datu Tumanggong
- Gaycon
- Langon
- Libertad (Poblacion)
- Linguisan
- Little Margos
- Loboc
- Looc-Labuan
- Lower Tungawan
- Malungon
- Masao
- San Isidro
- San Pedro
- San Vicente
- Santo Niño
- Sisay
- Taglibas
- Tigbanuang
- Tigbucay
- Tigpalay
- Timbabauan
- Upper Tungawan

=== Climate ===
Climate data for Tungawan, Zamboanga Sibugay
Month	Jan	Feb	Mar	Apr	May	Jun	Jul	Aug	Sep	Oct	Nov	Dec	Year
Mean daily maximum °C (°F)	30 (86)	30 (86)	31 (88)	31 (88)	30 (86)	29 (84)	29 (84)	29 (84)	29 (84)	29 (84)	30 (86)	30 (86)	30 (86)
Mean daily minimum °C (°F)	23 (73)	23 (73)	24 (75)	25 (77)	25 (77)	25 (77)	24 (75)	24 (75)	25 (77)	25 (77)	24 (75)	24 (75)	24 (76)
Average precipitation mm (inches)	98 (3.9)	78 (3.1)	116 (4.6)	115 (4.5)	222 (8.7)	281 (11.1)	272 (10.7)	282 (11.1)	237 (9.3)	258 (10.2)	180 (7.1)	108 (4.3)	2,247 (88.6)
Average rainy days	19.6	18.6	21.8	22.9	29.0	28.6	28.7	28.3	27.0	28.6	25.9	22.1	301.1
Source: Meteoblue

== Demographics ==
Population census of Tungawan
Year	Pop.	±% p.a.
1970	11,838	—
1975	9,573	−4.17%
1980	10,679	+2.21%
1990	26,005	+9.31%
1995	28,552	+1.77%
2000	33,194	+3.28%
2007	37,588	+1.73%
2010	40,552	+2.80%
2015	42,030	+0.68%
2020	46,497	+2.15%
2024	48,013	+0.77%
Source: Philippine Statistics Authority

The population of Tungawan are mostly Chavacanos especially the ones concentrated on the southwest border areas near Zamboanga City, they, together with the Subanon, and Cebuano who are Christian, form the majority population. However, there is also a significant minority of Tausug and Sama who are Muslim, most of whom live in coastal areas, especially in barangays Looc-Labuan, Linguisan, and Santo Niño. Then, Kolibugan people, a Muslim Subanon subgroup, mainly live in barangay Datu Tumanggong.

== Economy ==
Poverty incidence of Tungawan (%)

Source: Philippine Statistics Authority
