= DXKT-FM =

Magic 103 (DXKT)
- Titay; Philippines
- Broadcast area: Zamboanga Sibugay, parts of Zamboanga del Norte
- Frequency: 103.1 MHz
- Branding: Magic 103

Programming
- Languages: Cebuano, Filipino
- Format: Contemporary MOR, News, Talk
- Network: EMedia News FM

Ownership
- Owner: Westwind Broadcasting Network
- Operator: EMedia Productions

Technical information
- Licensing authority: NTC
- Power: 5,000 watts

DXKT (103.1 FM), broadcasting as Magic 103, is a radio station owned by Westwind Broadcasting Network and operated by EMedia Productions. The station's studio is located in Brgy. Poblacion, Titay.

On April 5, 2010, the station was bombed by riding in tandem men, leaving one injured.
