= Titay =

Municipality in The Province of Zamboanga Sibugay, Philippines

- Municipality
- Municipality of Titay
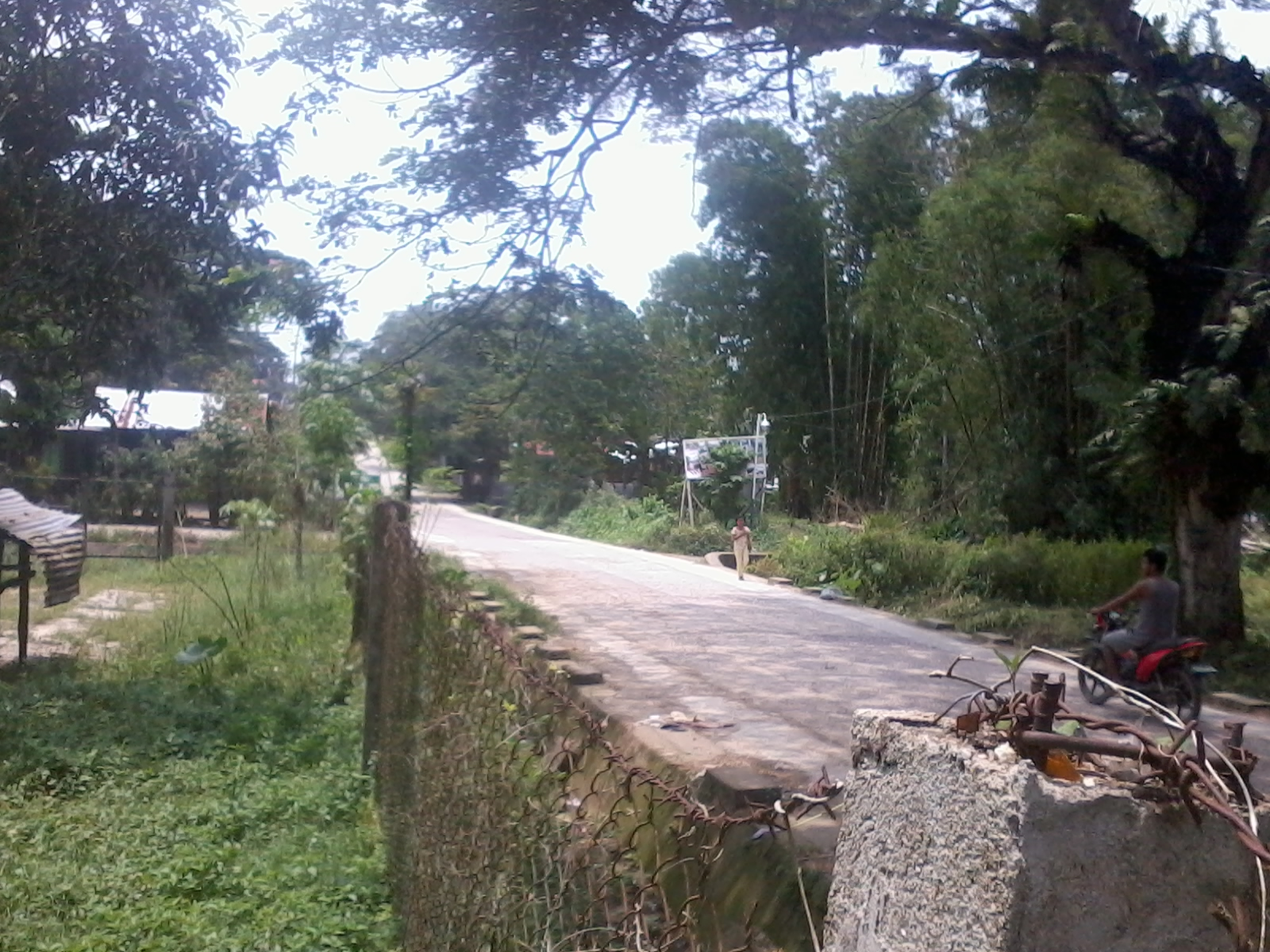
- Road to San Antonio in Titay

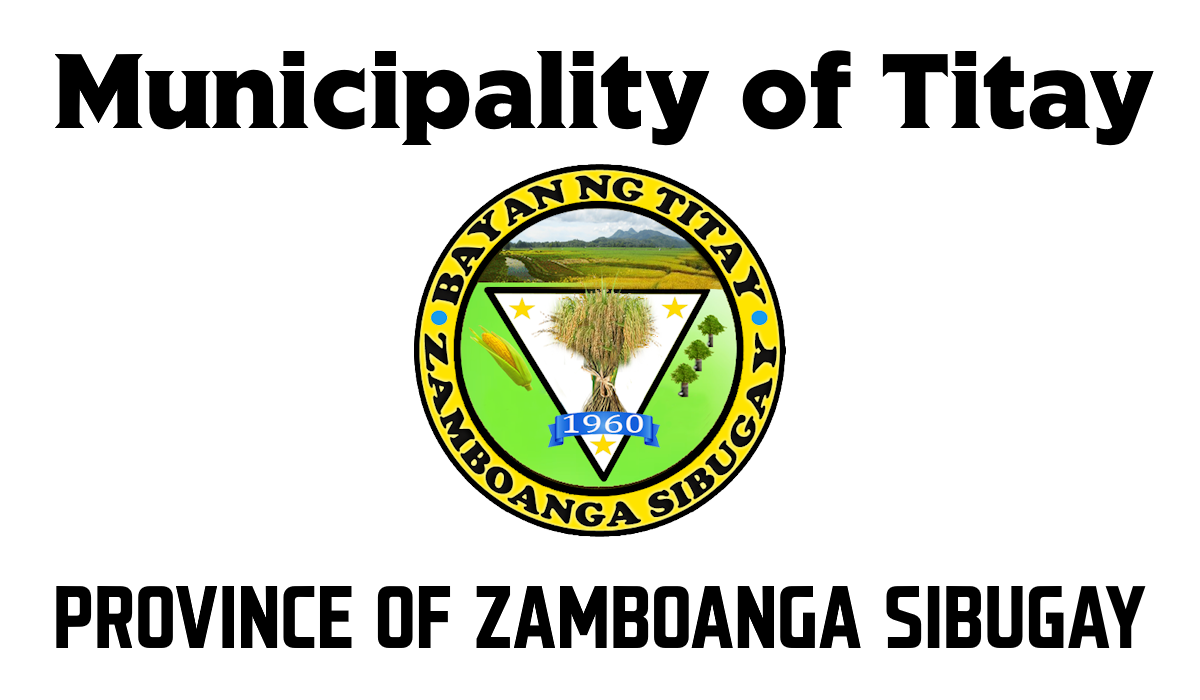
- Flag Seal

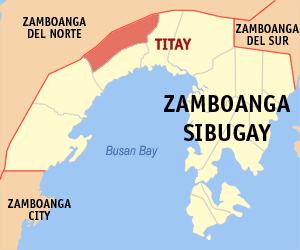
- Map of Zamboanga Sibugay with Titay highlighted
- Interactive map of Titay
- Location within the Philippines
- Coordinates: 7°52′13″N 122°33′34″E
- Country: Philippines
- Region: Zamboanga Peninsula
- Province: Zamboanga Sibugay
- District: 2nd district
- Founded: May 24, 1959
- Barangays: 30 (see Barangays)

Government
  - Type: Sangguniang Bayan
  - Mayor: Donrio Martinez
  - Vice Mayor: Bobong Talania
  - Representative: Dr. Marly T. Hofer-Hasim
  - Municipal Council: Members: Crizamille Laureen P. Jajurie; Samuel R. Cabadunga; Lupo F. Montejo Jr.; Ronito G. Porras; Edwin Butch N. Alegre; Perlie P. Sibud Jr.; Vidal M. Davin Jr.; Gemma R. Batan
  - Electorate: 37,145 voters (2025)

Area
  - Total: 350.44 km^{2} (135.31 sq mi)
- Elevation: 124 m (407 ft)
- Highest elevation: 482 m (1,581 ft)
- Lowest elevation: 31 m (102 ft)

Population (2024 census)
  - Total: 55,534
  - Density: 158.47/km^{2} (410.43/sq mi)
  - Households: 12,733

Economy
  - Income class: 1st municipal income class
  - Poverty incidence: 22.11% (2023)
  - Revenue: ₱ 275.8 million (2024)
  - Assets: ₱ 780 million (2024)
  - Expenditure: ₱ 98.97 million (2024)
  - Liabilities: ₱ 123.3 million (2024)

Service provider
  - Electricity: Zamboanga del Sur 2 Electric Cooperative (ZAMSURECO 2)
  - Water: Ipil-Titay Water District (ITWD)
- Time zone: UTC+8 (PST)
- ZIP code: 7003
- PSGC: 0908315000
- IDD : area code: +63 (0)62
- Native languages: Subanon; Cebuano; Chavacano; Tagalog
- Website: titay.gov.ph

Titay, officially the Municipality of Titay (Cebuano: Lungsod sa Titay; Chavacano: Municipalidad de Titay; Tagalog: Bayan ng Titay), is a municipality in the province of Zamboanga Sibugay, Philippines. According to the 2024 census, it has a population of 55,534 people.

Titay is a second-class municipality located in the province of Zamboanga Sibugay, in the Zamboanga Peninsula of the Philippines. Established on May 24, 1959 by virtue of Executive Order No. 395 it's known for its agricultural economy and natural attractions

It was declared as a separate municipality on May 24, 1959, by virtue of Executive Order No. 395.

== History ==
There are two versions about the origins of the municipality's name.

One version suggests that Subanens and Kalibugans are the original inhabitants of the area known as Taytay (a Subanen and Visayan word for bridge) referring to bridges seen along their houses, thus it later spelled as Titay.

The other states that in 1933 Custodio P. Mariano Sr., the first Ilocano settler from Nueva Ecija, discovered a small place in the center of the poblacion and registered the name of the place in honor of his favorite cousin back in Luzon who is Cristita Mariano nicknamed "Titay" knowing that a woman's name would bring good luck to the place. The Mariano families were among the first batch of Ilocanos who came from Luzon followed by the Dar families who are cousins of the Marianos as well as friends and other relatives from Ilocandia.

Titay was formerly a barrio within the jurisdiction of the Municipality of Kabasalan, Zamboanga del Sur. However, with the creation of the Municipality of Ipil in 1951, Titay was placed under its Municipal jurisdiction.

The continued influx of settlers from Luzon and Visayas in the area resulted in the cultivation of a wide area of agricultural lands. Along with development, the National Highway to Dipolog City was opened in 1958 traversing through the Barangay of Titay. Consequently, private businessmen were attracted to develop and establish agricultural, commercial and industrial establishments that greatly contributed to the development and programs of the locality.

Thus, on May 24, 1959, through the recommendation of former Zamboanga del Sur Governor Bienvenido Ebarle under Executive Order No. 395 was signed by President Carlos P. Garcia, creating Titay as a corporate Municipality of the Province of Zamboanga del Sur.

== Geography ==
=== Barangays ===
Titay is politically subdivided into 30 barangays. Each barangay consists of puroks while some have sitios.

- Achasol
- Azusano
- Bangco
- Camanga
- Culasian
- Dalangin
- Dalangin Muslim
- Dalisay
- Gomotoc
- Imelda (Upper Camanga)
- Kipit
- Kitabog
- La Libertad
- Longilog
- Mabini
- Malagandis
- Mate
- Moalboal
- Namnama
- New Canaan
- Palomoc
- Poblacion (Titay)
- Poblacion Muslim
- Pulidan
- San Antonio
- San Isidro
- Santa Fe
- Supit
- Tugop
- Tugop Muslim
- Poblacion Mariano

=== Climate ===
Climate data for Titay, Zamboanga Sibugay
Month	Jan	Feb	Mar	Apr	May	Jun	Jul	Aug	Sep	Oct	Nov	Dec	Year
Mean daily maximum °C (°F)	29 (84)	29 (84)	30 (86)	30 (86)	29 (84)	28 (82)	28 (82)	28 (82)	28 (82)	28 (82)	29 (84)	29 (84)	29 (84)
Mean daily minimum °C (°F)	22 (72)	22 (72)	23 (73)	24 (75)	24 (75)	24 (75)	24 (75)	24 (75)	24 (75)	24 (75)	24 (75)	23 (73)	24 (74)
Average precipitation mm (inches)	98 (3.9)	78 (3.1)	116 (4.6)	115 (4.5)	222 (8.7)	281 (11.1)	272 (10.7)	282 (11.1)	237 (9.3)	258 (10.2)	180 (7.1)	108 (4.3)	2,247 (88.6)
Average rainy days	19.6	18.6	21.8	22.9	29.0	28.6	28.7	28.3	27.0	28.6	25.9	22.1	301.1
Source: Meteoblue

== Demographics ==
Population census of Titay

Year	Pop.	±% p.a.
1970	19,008	—
1975	20,005	+1.03%
1980	24,983	+4.54%
1990	31,994	+2.50%
1995	35,065	+1.73%
2000	39,730	+2.71%

Year	Pop.	±% p.a.
2007	43,723	+1.33%
2010	46,456	+2.23%
2015	49,673	+1.28%
2020	53,994	+1.77%
2024	55,534	+0.68%

Source: Philippine Statistics Authority

== Economy ==
Poverty incidence of Titay (%)

Source: Philippine Statistics Authority

== Notable personalities ==
- George Hofer (died in 2019) - doctor, former Mayor of Titay (1992-1998); former Representative of the 3rd legislative district of Zamboanga del Sur (1998-2001); and first Governor of Zamboanga Sibugay (2001-2010)
