= Zamboanga Sibugay's 2nd congressional district =

Legislative district of the Philippines

- Constituency for the House of Representatives of the Philippines
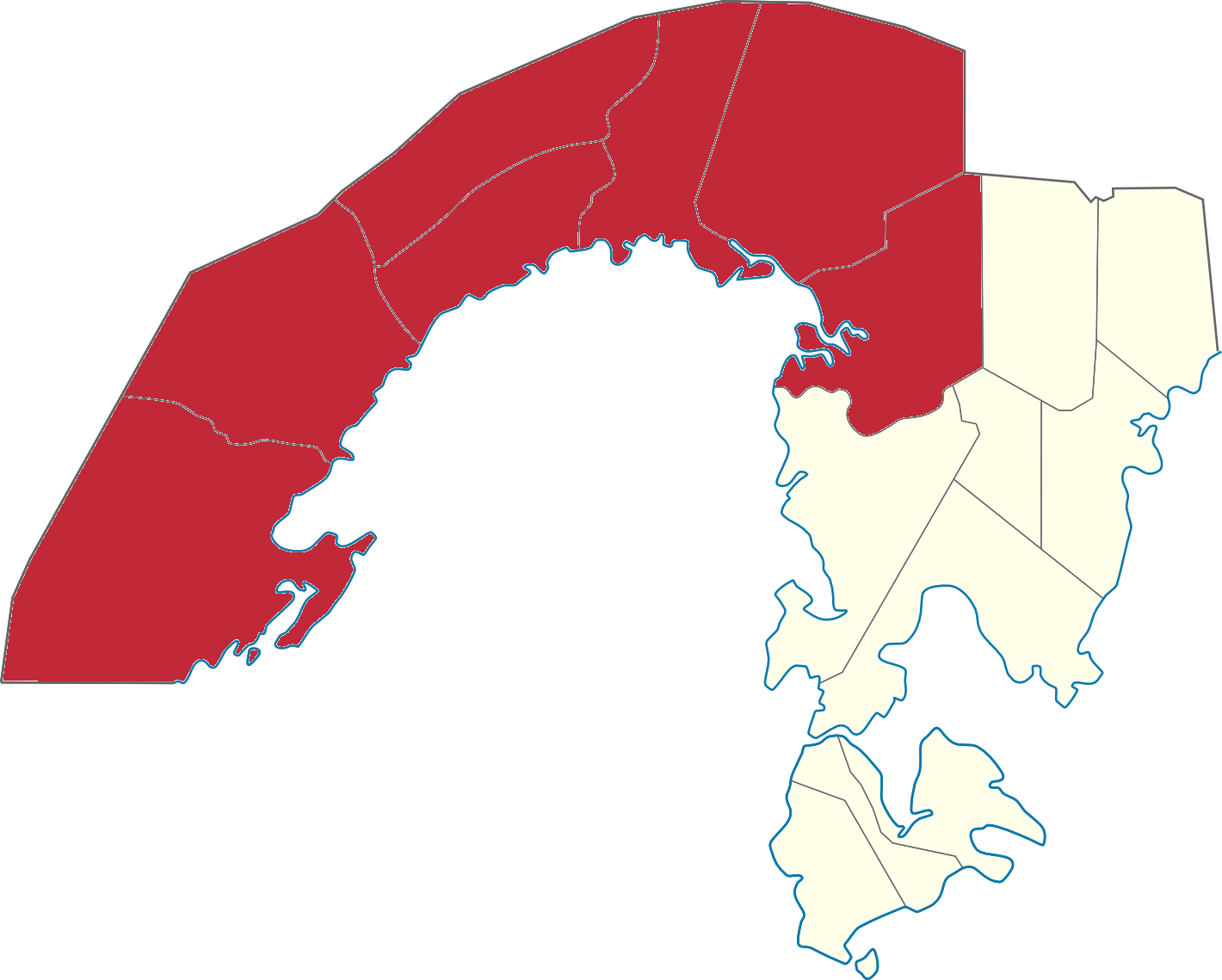
- Boundary of Zamboanga Sibugay's 2nd congressional district in Zamboanga Sibugay

- Location of Zamboanga Sibugay within the Philippines
- Province: Zamboanga Sibugay
- Region: Zamboanga Peninsula
- Population: 362,679 (2020)
- Electorate: 230,204 (2019)
- Major settlements: 7 LGUs: Municipalities; Ipil; Kabasalan; Naga; Roseller Lim; Siay; Titay; Tungawan
- Area: 2,214.48 km^{2} (855.02 sq mi)

Current constituency
- Created: 2006
- Representative: Marly Hofer–Hasim
- Political party: PFP
- Congressional bloc: Majority

Zamboanga Sibugay's 2nd congressional district is one of the two congressional districts of the Philippines in the province of Zamboanga Sibugay. It has been represented in the House of Representatives since 2007. It was created after the 2006 reapportionment that divided the province into two congressional districts. The district is composed of the provincial capital, Ipil, and the western municipalities of Kabasalan, Naga, Roseller Lim, Siay, Titay and Tungawan. It is currently represented in the 20th Congress by Marly Hofer–Hasim of the Partido Federal ng Pilipinas.

== Recent election results from province-wide races ==
Year	Office	Results
2022	President	Bongbong Marcos (PFP) 47.37%
2022	Vice President	Sara Duterte (Lakas) 68.69%
2022	Governor	Dulce Ann Hofer (PDP–Laban) 59.63%
2025	Governor	Dulce Ann Hofer (PFP) 64.23%

== List of members representing the district ==
=== House of Representatives (1987–present) ===
No.	Portrait	Member (Lifespan)	Term of office	Party	Legislature	Electoral history	Constituencies
District created July 24, 2006 from Zamboanga Sibugay's at-large district.
1		Dulce Ann Hofer (born 1967)	June 30, 2007 – June 30, 2010	Lakas	14th Congress	Elected in 2007.	2007–present Ipil, Kabasalan, Naga, Roseller Lim, Siay, Titay, Tungawan
2		Jon-jon Jalosjos (born 1971)	June 30, 2010 – June 30, 2013	Nacionalista	15th Congress	Elected in 2010.	2007–present Ipil, Kabasalan, Naga, Roseller Lim, Siay, Titay, Tungawan
(1)		Dulce Ann Hofer (born 1967)	June 30, 2013 – June 30, 2022	Liberal	16th Congress	Elected in 2013.	2007–present Ipil, Kabasalan, Naga, Roseller Lim, Siay, Titay, Tungawan
(1)		Dulce Ann Hofer (born 1967)	June 30, 2013 – June 30, 2022	PDP–Laban	17th Congress	Re-elected in 2016.	2007–present Ipil, Kabasalan, Naga, Roseller Lim, Siay, Titay, Tungawan
(1)		Dulce Ann Hofer (born 1967)	June 30, 2013 – June 30, 2022	PDP–Laban	18th Congress	Re-elected in 2019.	2007–present Ipil, Kabasalan, Naga, Roseller Lim, Siay, Titay, Tungawan
3		Antonieta Eudela (born 1969)	June 30, 2022 – June 30, 2025	Lakas	19th Congress	Elected in 2022.	2007–present Ipil, Kabasalan, Naga, Roseller Lim, Siay, Titay, Tungawan
4		Marly Hofer–Hasim (born 1974)	June 30, 2025 – present	PFP	20th Congress	Elected in 2025.	2007–present Ipil, Kabasalan, Naga, Roseller Lim, Siay, Titay, Tungawan

== Election results ==
=== 2010 ===
2010 Philippine House of Representatives election in Zamboanga Sibugay
Party	Candidate	Votes	%
Nacionalista	Jon-jon Jalosjos	65,909	50.53
Lakas–Kampi	George Hofer II	63,493	48.68
Independent	Moises Abellano Sr.	595	0.46
Liberal	Noe Barbadillo	445	0.34
Valid ballots		130,442	94.48
Invalid or blank votes		7,627	5.52
Total votes		138,069	100.00
Nacionalista gain from Lakas–Kampi			

=== 2013 ===
2013 Philippine House of Representatives election in Zamboanga Sibugay
Party	Candidate	Votes	%
Liberal	Dulce Ann Hofer	57,511	58.80
Nacionalista	Jon-jon Jalosjos	40,298	41.20
Total votes		97,809	100.00
Liberal gain from Nacionalista			

=== 2016 ===
2016 Philippine House of Representatives election in Zamboanga Sibugay
Party	Candidate	Votes	%
Liberal	Dulce Ann Hofer (incumbent)	119,115	94.42
PDP–Laban	Edgar Alegre	7,043	5.58
Total votes		126,158	100.00
Liberal hold			

=== 2019 ===
2019 Philippine House of Representatives election in Zamboanga Sibugay
Party	Candidate	Votes	%
PDP–Laban	Dulce Ann Hofer (incumbent)	96,788	62.30
PMP	Antonieta Eudela	58,572	37.70
Total votes		155,360	100.00
PDP–Laban hold			

=== 2022 ===
2022 Philippine House of Representatives election in Zamboanga Sibugay
Party	Candidate	Votes	%
Lakas	Antonieta Eudela	79,703	46.29
Nacionalista	George Hofer II	78,297	45.48
PPP	Eldwin Alibutdan	13,182	7.66
Independent	Josefino Bael	992	0.58
Total votes		172,174	100.00
Lakas gain from PDP–Laban			

=== 2025 ===
2025 Philippine House of Representatives election in Zamboanga Sibugay
Party	Candidate	Votes	%
PFP	Marly Hofer-Hasim	92,835	48.95
Lakas	Antonieta Eudela (incumbent)	71,823	37.87
PDP	Jarjar Acosta	22,108	11.66
Independent	Rino delos Reyes	2,607	1.37
Independent	Jose Gerosa	167	0.09
Independent	Al-Sharief Muloc	122	0.06
Total votes		189,662	100.00
PFP gain from Lakas			

== See also ==
- Legislative districts of Zamboanga Sibugay
