= Marly Hofer–Hasim =

Filipina physician and politician (born 1974)

Marly Hofer–Hasim MD
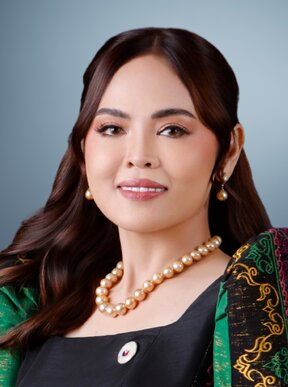
- Official portrait, 2025

Member of the Philippine House of Representatives from Zamboanga Sibugay's 2nd District
- Incumbent
- Assumed office June 30, 2025
- Preceded by: Antonieta Eudela

Personal details
- Born: Anna Marlesa Hofer Tamano; March 18, 1974 (age 52) Manila, Philippines
- Party: PFP (since 2024)
- Spouse: Madzmir Hasim (m. 2008)
- Children: 3
- Relatives: Ann Hofer (cousin); George T. Hofer (uncle)
- Education: University of the Philippines College of Medicine (MD)
- Occupation: Physician; politician
- Nickname: Doc Marly

Anna Marlesa Malahat Hofer Tamano–Hasim (born March 18, 1974) also known as Marly Hofer–Hasim, is a Filipina physician and politician. She has served as member of the Philippine House of Representatives from Zamboanga Sibugay's 2nd congressional district since June 30, 2025. The district is composed of the eastern portion of the province, including its capital Ipil.

Born and raised in Manila, Hofer-Hasim worked as an Ob-Gyn. She later moved to Zamboanga Sibugay in 2008 after marrying her husband, Madzmir. She ran for Congress in 2025, defeating the incumbent Antonieta Eudela, 48.95% to 37.87%.

== Early life and career ==
Hofer–Hasim was born on March 18, 1974, in Manila, the capital city of the Philippines. Her maternal great-grandparents were the first Christian settlers in Balabagan, Lanao (now part of Lanao del Sur). Her father, Salipada Tamano, is a Maranao professor of Mindanao State University – Main Campus in Marawi and was a DEPED regional secretary for Autonomous Region in Muslim Mindanao. Her mother is Marlene Hofer, a professor and former dean of the college of business in Mindanao State University and of Spanish, German, and Maranao descent.

She graduated and earned her bachelor's degree in Medicine from the University of the Philippines College of Medicine. She also runs various Ob-Gyn clinics at the Mall of Asia, and on Taft avenue in Manila.

== House of Representatives ==
=== Elections ===
==== 2025 ====
Hofer–Hasim had been considered a potential contender for Zamboanga Sibugay's 2nd congressional district in the 2025 elections. She officially filed her candidacy for the seat under Partido Federal ng Pilipinas on October 3, 2024, with incumbent governor Ann Hofer of whom seeking reelection. In May 13, 2025, Hofer-Hasim was proclaimed winner of the election, defeating incumbent, Antonieta Eudela and five other candidates.

=== Tenure ===
Hofer–Hasim took office on June 30, 2025. During her first day, she filed her first bill, which aims to create the city of Ipil. She attended and take her oath during the inauguration of provincial and municipal officials at the Provincial Capitol grounds on July 2, 2025 in Zamboanga Sibugay.

== Personal life ==
Hofer–Hasim is married to Sharif Madzmir Hasim in 2008. Their marriage rites were held at the Manila Polo Club main lounge. Madzmir, graduated in Cebu Institute of Technology, and owns a construction firm in Zamboanga City and a review center in accountancy in Davao City. He is also a descendant from the Sultanate of Sulu. They have three children and resides in barangay Caparan, Ipil, Zamboanga Sibugay. Hofer–Hasim is a Muslim.

== Electoral history ==
Election Year	Position	Party	Votes for Hofer–Hasim				Result	Ref.
Election Year	Position	Party	Total	%	Plc.	Swing	Result	Ref.
2025	Representative	PFP	92,835	48.95%	1st	N/A	Won	
