= Laws of the 13th Congress of the Philippines =

Laws passed by 13th Congress of Philippines

The following is the list of laws passed by the 13th Congress of the Philippines:

Date approved	RA number	Title/category	Affected municipality or city	Affected province
2004-09-21	9333	Fixing the Date of Regular Elections of Elective Officials of the Autonomous Region in Muslim Mindanao		Basilan, Lanao del Sur, Maguindanao, Sulu, and Tawi-Tawi
2004-12-21	9334	Amending the National Internal Revenue Code of 1997 or RA 8424 : On Excise Tax on Distilled Spirits, Wines, Fermented Liquors, Tobacco Products, Cigars, and Cigarettes		
2005-01-25	9335	Attrition Act of 2005 : On the Bureau of Internal Revenue and Bureau of Customs		
2005-03-15	9336	Appropriations Act of 2005		
2005-05-24	9337	Amending the National Internal Revenue Code of 1997 or RA 8424		
2005-07-28	9338	Granting Citizenship to a Person		
2005-09-01	9339	Electric Power Distribution Franchise Renewal : Visayan Electric Company, Inc. (VECO)	Cebu City, Mandaue City, Talisay City, Minglanilla, Naga, San Fernando, Consolacion, and Lilo-an	Cebu
2005-09-22	9340	Amending the Synchronized Barangay and Sangguniang Kabataan Elections Act or RA 9164 : Moving the October 2005 Elections to October 2007		
2005-12-21	9341	Rent Control Act of 2005 (Residential)		
2006-01-19	9342	Amending RA 8996 or the Radio and Television Broadcasting Franchise of End Time Mission Broadcasting Service, Inc		
2006-04-24	9343	Amending the Special Purpose Vehicle Act of 2002 or RA 9182 : On the Period of Application for Establishment and Registration, and On Tax Exemptions and Fee Privileges		
2006-04-28	9344	Juvenile Justice and Welfare Act of 2006 (Read about the Convention on the Rights of the Child)		
2006-06-05	9345	Converting a Road and a Bridge into National Road : Panglao Island Circumferential Road	Panglao, Dauis, and Tagbilaran City	Bohol
2006-06-24	9346	Prohibition of the Imposition of Death Penalty : Repealing RA 8177, and Amending RA 7659 and the Revised Penal Code or Act 3815		
2006-07-27	9347	Amending the Labor Code of the Philippines or PD 442 : Rationalizing the Composition and Functions of the National Labor Relations Commission		
2006-08-04	9348	Converting a Road into National Road	Iligan City, and Talakag	Lanao del Norte, and Bukidnon
2006-08-04	9349	Converting a Road into National Road : Concepcion-Capas Road	Concepcion, and Capas	Tarlac
2006-08-04	9350	Converting a Road into National Road : Ramos-Pura Road	Ramos, and Pura	Tarlac
2006-08-04	9351	Converting a Road into National Road : Victoria-La Paz Road	Victoria, and La Paz	Tarlac
2006-08-04	9352	Converting a Road into National Road : Anao-Ramos Road	Anao, and Ramos	Tarlac
2006-09-26	9353	Amending RA 9027 : Inclusion of Accreted Land into the Territory of Sipalay City	Sipalay City	Negros Occidental
2006-09-28	9354	Radio Broadcasting Franchise : Radio Maria Foundation, Inc.		
2006-10-02	9355	Creating a Province : Dinagat Islands	Basilisa, Cagdianao, Dinagat, Libjo (Albor), Loreto, San Jose, and Tubajon	Dinagat Islands, and Surigao del Norte
2006-10-02	9356	Converting a Municipality into a Component City	Meycauayan City	Bulacan
2006-10-10	9357	Reapportioning Legislative Districts of Sultan Kudarat	[First] Columbio, Isulan, Lambayong, Lutayan, President Quirino, and Tacurong; [Second] Bagumbayan, Esperanza, Kalamansig, Lebak, Palimbang, and Senator Ninoy Aquino	Sultan Kudarat
2006-10-17	9358	Supplemental Appropriations Act for 2006		
2006-10-17	9359	Establishing a Standby Fund for the Guimaras Oil Spill Clean Up, the Relief for Mayon Volcano#2006 eruptions Eruption Victims, and the Emergency OFW Repatriation Fund		
2006-10-26	9360	Reapportioning Legislative Districts of Zamboanga Sibugay	[First] Buug, Diplahan, Malangas, Imelda, Alicia, Mabuhay, Olutanga, Talusan, and Payao; [Second] Siay, Kabasalan, Naga, Ipil, Titay, Roseller T. Lim, and Tungawan	Zamboanga Sibugay
2006-11-21	9361	Amending the National Internal Revenue Code of 1997 or RA 8424 : On Excess Output or Input Tax		
2006-11-30	9362	Granting Citizenship to a Person		
2006-11-30	9363	Granting Citizenship to a Person		
2006-12-15	9364	Amending the Charter of the City of Marikina or RA 8223 : Subdividing its Lone Legislative District into Two Districts	Marikina	NCR
2006-12-21	9365	Creating New Enlisted Ranks in the Armed Forces of the Philippines (AFP) : First Chief Master Sergeant and First Master Chief Petty Officer		
2007-01-09	9366	Granting Citizenship to a Person		
2007-01-12	9367	Biofuels Act of 2006		
2007-01-14	9368	Horse Racing Franchise : Mindanao Jockey and Country Club, Inc.		
2007-01-23	9369	Amending RA 8436, RA 7166, RA 6646, and BP 881 : On the Use of Automated Election System in National and Local Electoral Exercises		
2007-02-03	9370	Radio and Television Broadcasting Franchise : Muslim Mindanao Radio and Television Network Corporation		Lanao del Sur
2007-02-22	9371	Reapportioning Legislative districts of Cagayan de Oro	Cagayan de Oro	Misamis Oriental
2007-03-06	9372	Human Security Act of 2007		
2007-03-06	9373	Creating additional Branches of the Regional Trial Court	Tacloban City	Leyte
2007-03-06	9374	Creating additional Branches of the Metropolitan Trial Court	Caloocan	NCR
2007-03-06	9375	Creating additional Branches of the Regional Trial Court and the Municipal Trial Court	Talisay City	Cebu
2007-03-06	9376	Creating additional Branches of the Metropolitan Trial Court	Parañaque City	NCR
2007-03-06	9377	Creating additional Branches of the Regional Trial Court and the Municipal Trial Court	Antipolo City	Rizal
2007-03-07	9378	Declaring Every February 4 a Special Working Holiday in Muntinlupa City in Commemoration of the "Araw ng Kalayaan ng Muntinlupa"	Muntinlupa	NCR
2007-03-08	9379	The Handline Fishing Law		
2007-03-06	9380	Declaring Every May 6 a Special Working Holiday in Pilar Municipality to Commemorate the Death of its Former Mayor, Manuel Sia	Pilar	Sorsogon
2007-03-09	9381	Electric Power Distribution Franchise Renewal : Angeles Electric Corporation	Angeles City	Pampanga
2007-03-10	9382	Cable/Community Antenna Television Franchise : Cable Link Holdings Corp.		
2007-03-10	9383	Radio Broadcasting Franchise : Universidad de Zamboanga		Zamboanga Sibugay
2007-03-10	9384	Radio and Television Broadcasting Franchise : Puerto Princesa Broadcasting Corporation		Palawan
2007-03-10	9385	Electric Power Distribution Franchise Renewal : La Union Electric Company, Inc	San Fernando City, Bauang, and San Juan	La Union
2007-03-10	9386	Radio and Television Broadcasting Franchise : iTransmission, Inc		
2007-03-10	9387	Converting a Municipality into a Highly Urbanized City	Navotas	NCR
2007-03-11	9388	Converting a Municipality into a Highly Urbanized City	San Juan City	NCR
2007-03-15	9389	Converting a Municipality into a Component City	Baybay City	Leyte
2007-03-15	9390	Converting a Municipality into a Component City	Bogo	Cebu
2007-03-15	9391	Converting a Municipality into a Component City	Catbalogan	Samar
2007-03-15	9392	Converting a Municipality into a Component City	Tandag City	Surigao del Sur
2007-03-15	9393	Converting a Municipality into a Component City	Lamitan City	Basilan
2007-03-16	9394	Converting a Municipality into a Component City	Borongan	Eastern Samar
2007-03-17	9395	Converting a State College into a State University : Southern Luzon State University (SLSU)		Quezon
2007-03-18	9396	Amending RA 6948 : Redefining the Term "Veteran"		
2007-03-18	9397	Amending the Urban Development and Housing Act of 1992 or RA 7279 : On Disposition of Lands for Socialized Housing		
2007-03-18	9398	Converting a Municipality into a Component City	Tayabas City	Quezon
2007-03-20	9399	Declaring a One-Time Amnesty on Certain Tax and Duty Liabilities incurred by Certain Business Enterprises operating within Special Economic Zones and Freeport		
2007-03-20	9400	Amending the Bases Conversion and Development Act of 1992 or RA 7227		
2007-03-22	9401	Appropriations Act of 2007		
2007-03-22	9402	Converting a State College into a State University : Laguna State Polytechnic University		Laguna
2007-03-22	9403	Integrating State Colleges into a State University : Bataan Peninsula State University (BPSU)		Bataan
2007-03-23	9404	Converting a Municipality into a Component City	Tabuk City	Kalinga
2007-03-23	9405	Converting a Municipality into a Component City	Bayugan City	Agusan del Sur
2007-03-23	9406	Amending the Administrative Code of 1987 or EO 292 : Reorganizing and Strengthening the Public Attorney's Office (PAO)		
2007-03-24	9407	Converting a Municipality into a Component City	Batac City	Ilocos Norte
2007-03-24	9408	Converting a Municipality into a Component City	Mati City	Davao Oriental
2007-03-24	9409	Converting a Municipality into a Component City	Guihulngan City	Negros Oriental
2007-03-24	9410	Amending RA 9031 : Changing a Special Working Holiday into a Special Nonworking Holiday in Camarines Sur		Camarines Sur
2007-03-24	9411	Declaring Every January 22 a Special Nonworking Holiday in Vigan City in Commemoration of its Cityhood	Vigan City	Ilocos Sur
2007-03-24	9412	Declaring Every August 20 a Special Nonworking Holiday in Dulag Municipality in Commemoration of its Foundation	Dulag	Leyte
2007-03-24	9413	Declaring Every April 3 a Special Nonworking Holiday in Luisiana Municipality in Celebration of the "Araw ng Lubusang Kalayaan Bilang Bayan ng Luisiana" and the Pandan Festival	Luisiana	Laguna
2007-03-24	9414	Declaring Every June 19 a Special Nonworking Holiday in the Northern Samar Province in Commemoration of its Foundation		Northern Samar
2007-03-25	9415	Amending RA 2239 : Allowing the Ramon Magsaysay Foundation to Sell or Lease its Land or Space within Their Building	Manila City	NCR
2007-03-25	9416	Declaring Unlawful Any Form of Cheating in the Civil Service Commission Examinations, and the Use and Possession of CSC Examination-Related Materials		
2007-03-30	9417	Expanding and Streamlining the Office of the Solicitor General's Bureaucracy, Upgrading Employee Skills, and Augmenting Benefits		
2007-04-10	9418	Volunteer Act of 2007		
2007-04-10	9419	Increasing Bed Capacity of a Hospital : Amang Rodriguez Memorial Medical Center	Marikina	NCR
2007-04-10	9420	Conversion of a Portion of Bed Capacity For Tertiary General Hospital Use : Dr. Jose N. Rodriguez Memorial Hospital and Sanitarium	Caloocan	NCR
2007-04-10	9421	Changing the name of a Medical Institution : Valenzuela Medical Center with Increased Bed Capacity into a Tertiary Level Hospital	Valenzuela City	NCR
2007-04-10	9422	Amending the Migrant Workers and Overseas Filipinos Act of 1995 or RA 8042 : Strengthening the Regulatory Functions of the Philippine Overseas Employment Administration (POEA)		
2007-04-10	9423	Creating an additional Branch of the Regional Trial Court	Wao	Lanao del Sur
2007-04-10	9424	Creating additional Branches of the Metropolitan Trial Court	Marikina	NCR
2007-04-10	9425	Declaring Every December 13 a Special Working Holiday in General Trias Municipality in Commemoration of its Foundation	General Trias	Cavite
2007-04-10	9426	Declaring Every March 8 a Special Working Holiday in the Compostela Valley Province in Commemoration of its Foundation		Compostela Valley
2007-04-10	9427	Declaring Every February 5 a Special Working Holiday in Biñan Municipality to Commemorate its Liberation from Japanese Occupation	Biñan	Laguna
2007-04-10	9428	Declaring Every February 14 a Special Working Holiday in Valenzuela City to Commemorate its Conversion into a Highly Urbanized City	Valenzuela City	NCR
2007-04-10	9429	Declaring Every September 18 a Special Working Holiday in Tacurong City in Commemoration of its Cityhood	Tacurong City	Sultan Kudarat
2007-04-10	9430	Declaring Every July 23 a Special Working Holiday in Tanauan City in Commemoration of the Birth of Apolinario Mabini	Tanauan City	Batangas
2007-04-10	9431	Creating a Barangay : Barangay Fortune	Marikina	NCR
2007-04-10	9432	Creating a Barangay : Barangay Tumana	Marikina	NCR
2007-04-11	9433	Magna Carta for Public Social Workers		
2007-04-12	9434	Converting a Municipality into a Component City	Cabadbaran	Agusan del Norte
2007-04-12	9435	Converting a Municipality into a Component City	El Salvador	Misamis Oriental
2007-04-15	9436	Converting a Municipality into a Component City	Carcar	Cebu
2007-04-27	9437	Amending RA 9158 : Renaming the Leyte State University as the Visayas State University	Baybay City	Leyte
2007-04-27	9438	Changing the Name of a National High School : Juan S. Tismo National High School	Babatngon	Leyte
2007-04-27	9439	Prohibition of the Detention of Patients in Hospitals and Medical Clinics Due to Nonpayment of Hospital Bills or Medical Expenses		
2007-04-28	9440	Establishing a Marine Fisheries Laboratory	San Jose	Northern Samar
2007-04-28	9441	Establishing a Marine Research and Breeding Center	Baler	Aurora
2007-04-30	9442	Amending the Magna Carta for Disabled Persons or RA 7277 : Provision for other Privileges and Incentives, Prohibitions on Ridicule and Vilification, and Change of the Act's Title to "Magna Carta for Persons with Disability"		
2007-05-09	9443	Confirming and Declaring the Validity of Existing Transfer Certificates of Title and Reconstituted Certificates of Title Covering the Banilad Friar Lands Estate	Info Needed	Cebu
2007-05-09	9444	Declaring a Tourism Zone : Atulayan Island	Sagñay	Camarines Sur
2007-05-09	9445	Declaring a Tourism Zone : Islands of Lahuy, Cotivas, Guinahuan, Luksuhin, Malibagan, and Masag	Caramoan	Camarines Sur
2007-05-09	9446	Declaring a Tourism Zone : Bohol		Bohol
2007-05-15	9447	Changing the name of an Elementary School : Mariana L. Pineda Memorial Elementary School	Butuan	Agusan del Norte
2007-05-15	9448	Creating an additional Branch of the Regional Trial Court	Imelda	Zamboanga Sibugay
2007-05-15	9449	Creating an additional Branch of the Municipal Trial Court	Daet	Camarines Norte
2007-05-15	9450	Creating additional Branches of the Municipal Trial Court	San Jose Del Monte City	Bulacan
2007-05-15	9451	Establishing a National Science High School : Las Piñas City National Science High School	Las Piñas City	NCR
2007-05-15	9452	Converting a High School Annex into an Independent National High School : Caa National High School	Las Piñas City	NCR
2007-05-15	9453	Changing the name of a National High School : Pinto National High School	Alfonso Lista	Ifugao
2007-05-15	9454	Changing the name of a National High School : Dr. Rodolfo V. Pamor, Jr. Memorial National High School	Tigaon	Camarines Sur
2007-05-15	9455	Changing the name of an Elementary School : Egmidio V. Manzo Memorial Elementary Elementary School	Tanjay City	Negros Oriental
2007-05-15	9456	Converting a State College into a State University : Bukidnon State University		Bukidnon
2007-05-15	9457	Creating a Barangay : Barangay San Carlos	Binangonan	Rizal
2007-05-15	9458	Declaring a Tourism Zone(s)	Biri, Capul, San Antonio, and San Vicente	Northern Samar
2007-05-15	9459	Establishing a Marine Farm for Oysters, Mussels, Crabs, Prawns, and Shrimps	Calabanga	Camarines Sur
2007-05-15	9460	Establishing a Marine Research and Breeding Center	Odiongan	Romblon
2007-05-15	9461	Naming a Road : Marcelino R. Veloso National Highway	Villaba, Tabango, San Isidro, Calubian, and Leyte	Leyte
2007-05-15	9462	Naming a Road : Apolinario Mabini Superhighway (AMS)	Tanauan City, Lipa City, Batangas City, Santo Tomas, Malvar, and Ibaan	Batangas
2007-05-15	9463	Naming a Road : Josefa Llanes Escoda National Highway	San Nicolas, Sarrat, Dingras, and Solsona	Ilocos Norte
2007-05-15	9464	Renaming a Road : Romeo G. Guanzon Avenue	Bacolod City	Negros Occidental
2007-05-15	9465	Renaming a Road : Governor Joaquin L. Ortega Avenue	San Fernando City	La Union
2007-05-15	9466	Renaming a Road : Mayor Lorenzo L. Dacanay Avenue	San Fernando City	La Union
2007-05-15	9467	Renaming a Road : Congressman Hilarion J. Ramiro By-Pass Road	Ozamiz City	Misamis Occidental
2007-05-15	9468	Renaming a Road : Jose W. Diokno Boulevard	Pasay	NCR
2007-05-21	9469	Changing the name of a Fisheries School : Bangui Institute of Technology	Bangui	Ilocos Norte
2007-05-21	9470	National Archives of the Philippines Act of 2007		
2007-05-21	9471	Establishing an Aquatic Research and Technology Center	Info Needed	Camarines Sur
2007-05-22	9472	Amending RA 9045 : Excluding the Polytechnic University of the Philippines Campus in Santo Tomas from Batangas State University	Santo Tomas	Batangas
2007-05-22	9473	Converting a High School Annex into an Independent National High School : Golden Acres National High School	Las Piñas City	NCR
2007-05-22	9474	Lending Company Regulation Act of 2007		
2007-05-22	9475	Changing the name of an Agricultural School : Lasam Institute of Technology	Lasam	Cagayan
2007-05-22	9476	Renaming a Road : Crisanto M. De Los Reyes Avenue	General Trias, Tagaytay City, and Amadeo	Cavite
2007-05-22	9477	Renaming a Road : Jose Abad Santos Avenue (JASA)	Gapan, San Isidro, Cabiao, Santa Ana, Arayat, Mexico, San Fernando City, Bacolor, Guagua, Lubao, Hermosa, Dinalupihan, and Olongapo City	Nueva Ecija, Pampanga, Bataan, and Zambales
2007-05-24	9478	Radio and Television Broadcasting Franchise : Free Air Broadcasting Network Corp.		
2007-05-24	9479	Local Exchange Network Franchise Renewal : Ormoc City Telephone Company, Inc. (with Amendments)		Leyte, Southern Leyte, and Biliran
2007-05-24	9480	Granting Amnesty on All Unpaid National Internal Revenue Taxes for 2005 and Prior Years		
2007-05-25	9481	Amending the Labor Code of the Philippines or PD 442 : Strengthening the Workers' Constitutional Right to Self-Organization		
2007-05-25	9482	Anti-Rabies Act of 2007		
2007-06-02	9483	Oil Pollution Compensation Act of 2007 (Read about the liability and the Fund)		
2007-06-02	9484	The Philippine Dental Act of 2007 : Repealing the Philippine Dental Act of 1965 or RA 4419, and the Philippine Dental Hygienist Law or RA 768 (Read about the history of the practice in the Philippines)		
2007-06-02	9485	Anti-Red Tape Act of 2007		
2007-06-07	9486	Central Cebu Protected Landscape (CCPL) Act of 2007	Cebu City, Talisay City, Toledo City, Danao, Minglanilla, Consolacion, Lilo-an, Compostela, and Balamban	Cebu
2007-06-20	9487	Amending the Charter of the Philippine Amusement and Gaming Corporation or PD 1869		
2007-06-24	9488	Renaming a Road : Diosdado Macapagal Highway	Info Needed	Camarines Sur, and Albay
2007-06-29	9489	Granting Citizenship to a Person		
2007-06-29	9490	Establishing a Special Economic Zone	Casiguran	Aurora
2007-07-15	9491	Converting a Municipality into a Component City	Naga City	Cebu
2007-07-24	9492	Amending EO 292 : On the Observance of Regular and Nationwide Special Days		
2007-07-25	9493	Recognizing the International Character of the Southville International School	Las Piñas City, and Parañaque City	NCR
2007-08-22	9494	The Mimbilisan Protected Landscape Act	Balingoan, and Talisayan	Misamis Oriental
2007-09-07	9495	Creating a Province : Quezon del Sur (Read on the plebiscite)		Quezon
