= Military ranks of the Philippines =

The Military ranks of the Philippines are the military insignia used by the Armed Forces of the Philippines.

== Introduction ==
The current Philippine military ranks are inspired partially by the first military insignia used by the military forces during the Philippine Revolution of 1896 and the Philippine–American War, and the insignia used by the Philippine Constabulary raised in 1902 during the final days of the Philippine–American War, which was basically the same style of insignia used by the United States Army at that time. Elements of both the US army ranks and the old Philippine Army appear in the current ranks; this was reflected at the general officers insignia and enlisted ranks that resembled those of the US military (the silver stars used by generals and admirals were used by field grade officers in the First Republic), the field officers (like colonels), whose insignia are suns, use those insignia used by general officers of the Revolutionary Army. Company rank insignia (i.e. captain), consisting of a silver triangle, are a recent creation. Both company grade and field grade officer insignia have the baybayin letter ka (K) in the middle, another throwback to the days of the war for independence, and even in the medal used by second-level members of the Katipunan during meetings, in which the letter is in the center.

== Current ranks ==
The current AFP insignia used today are a modification of the system first used in 1954–55, as part of the Filipinization of the military forces by then President and former Secretary of National Defense Ramon Magsaysay, ending years of the US-styled rank system in place since 1935. Prior to that period, the Philippines used the same rank insignia of the United States Armed Forces with modifications for Philippine conditions.

=== Officer ranks ===
The rank insignia of commissioned officers.

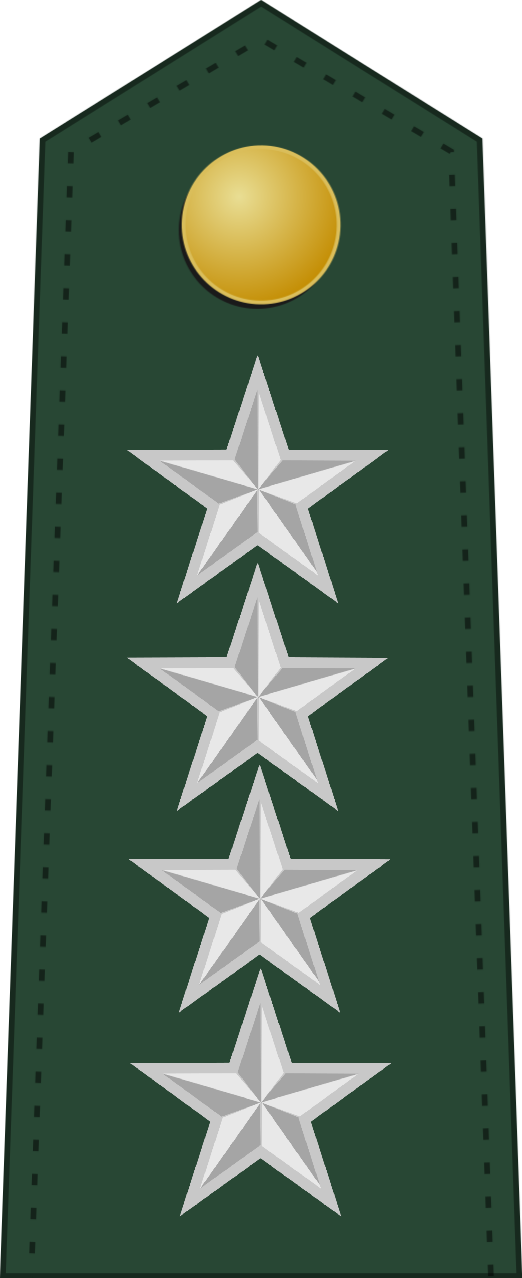
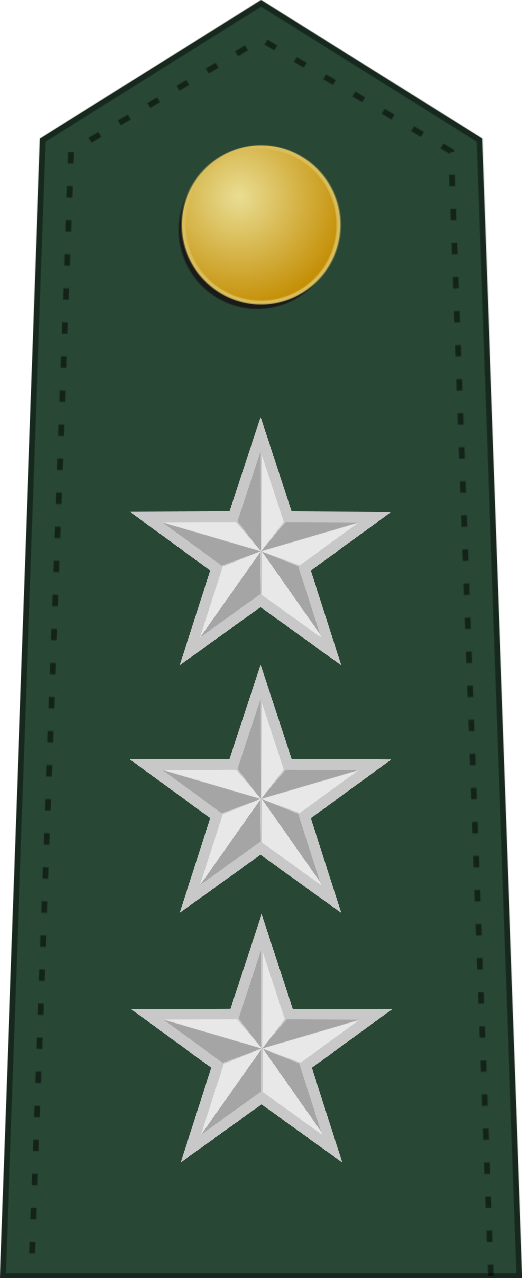
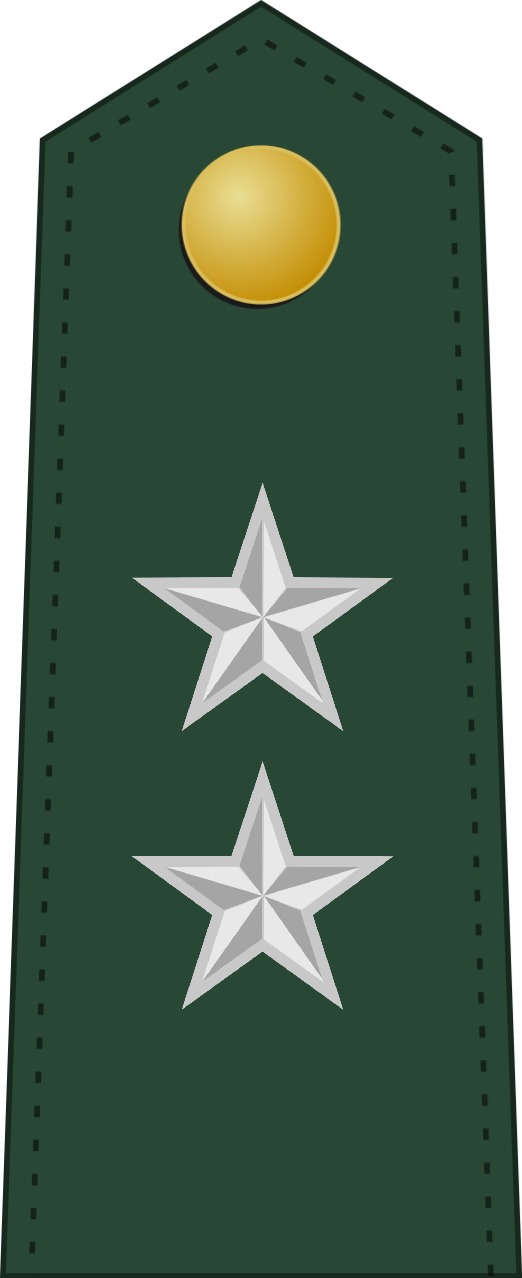
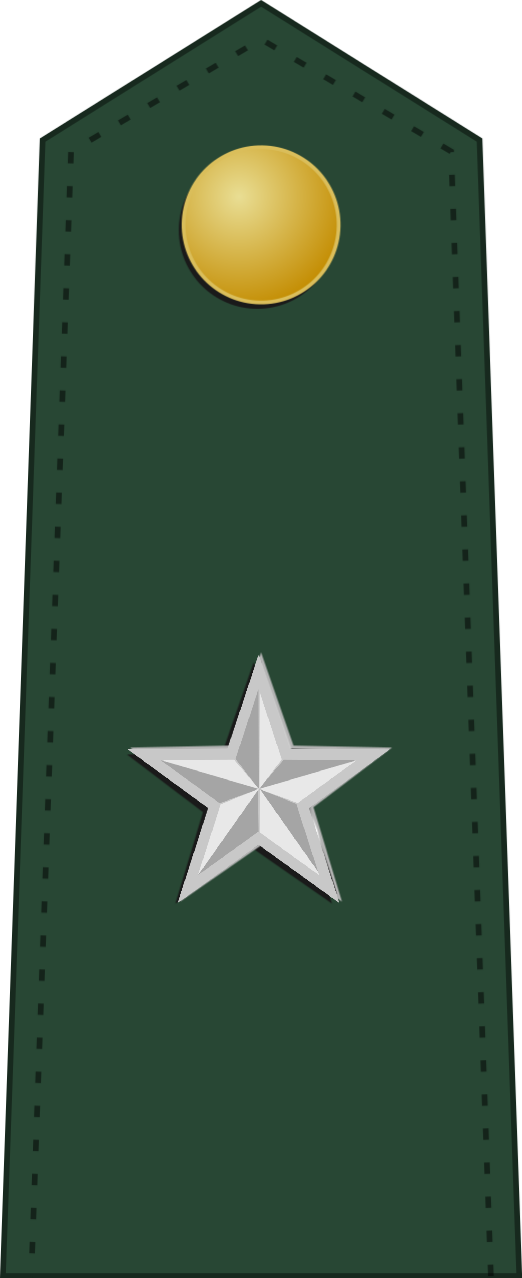
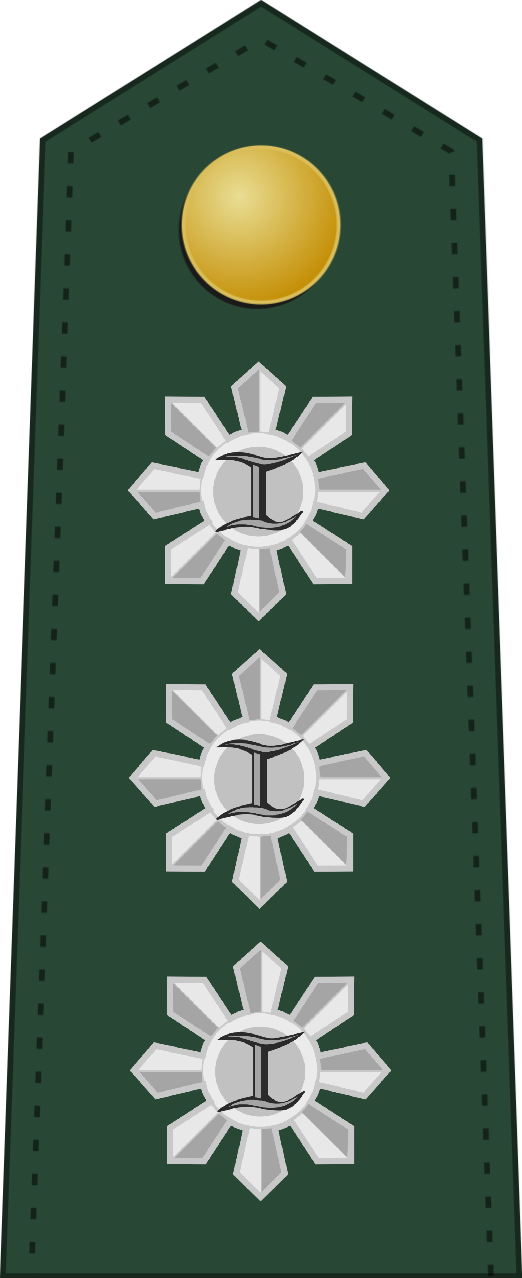
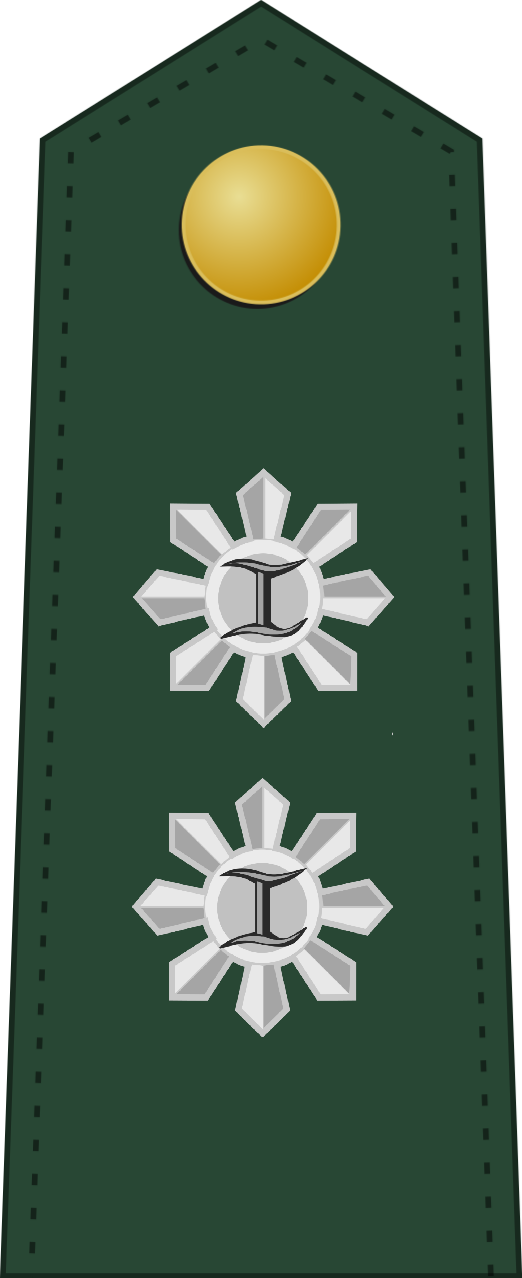
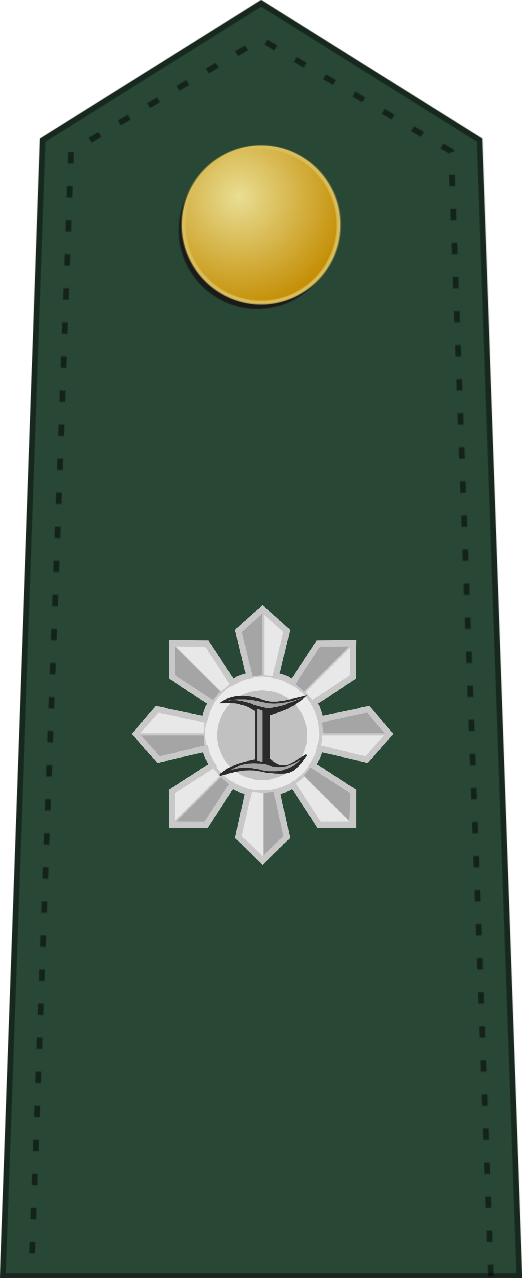
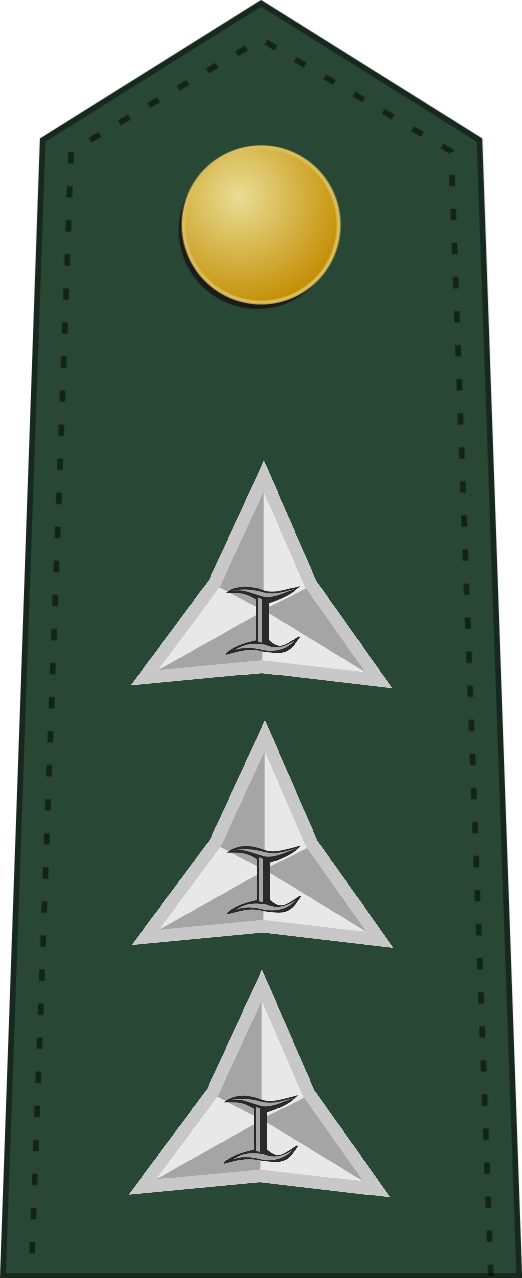
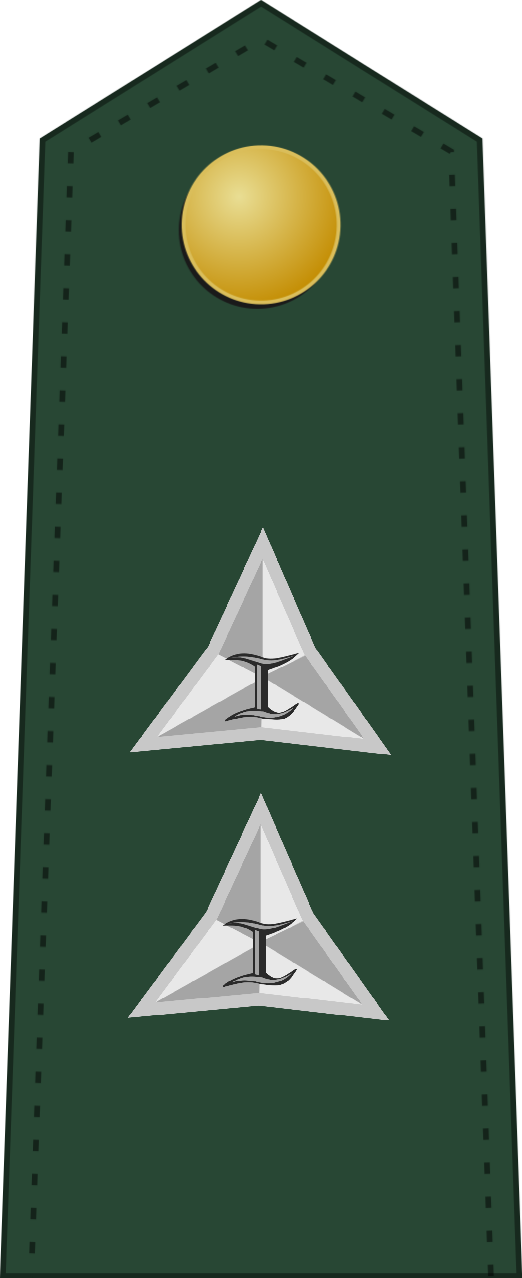
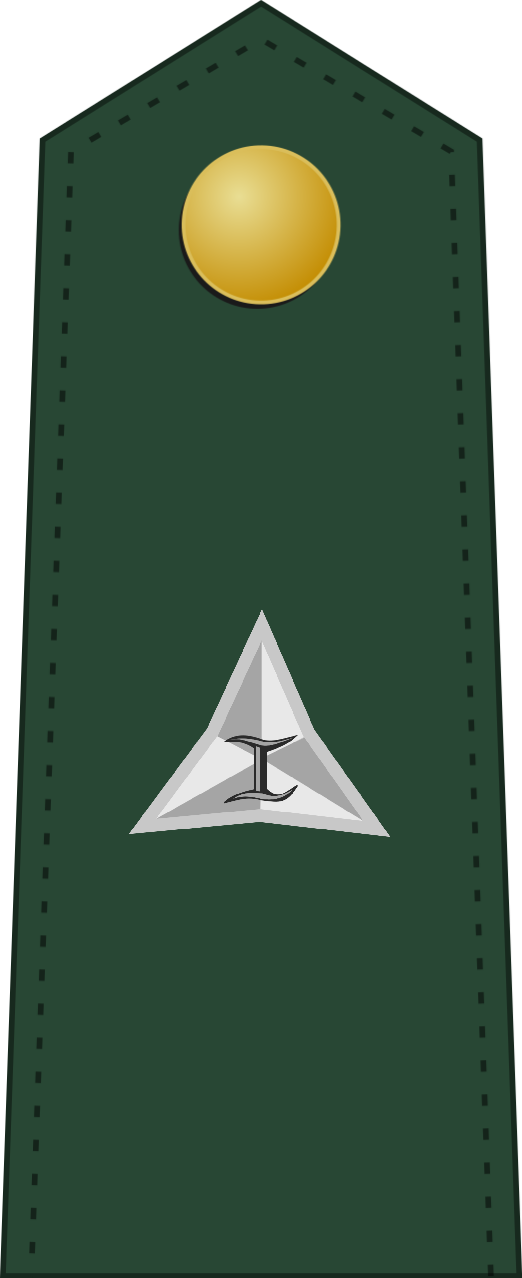
Rank group	General / flag officers				Senior officers			Junior officers
Philippine Army
Philippine Army	General	Lieutenant general	Major general	Brigadier general	Colonel	Lieutenant Colonel	Major	Captain	First lieutenant	Second lieutenant
Philippine Air Force
Philippine Air Force	General	Lieutenant general	Major general	Brigadier general	Colonel	Lieutenant colonel	Major	Captain	First lieutenant	Second lieutenant
Philippine Navy
Philippine Navy	Admiral	Vice admiral	Rear admiral	Commodore	Captain	Commander	Lieutenant commander	Lieutenant	Lieutenant junior grade	Ensign
Philippine Marine Corps
Philippine Marine Corps	General	Lieutenant general	Major general	Brigadier general	Colonel	Lieutenant colonel	Major	Captain	First lieutenant	Second lieutenant
Philippine Coast Guard
Philippine Coast Guard	Admiral	Vice admiral	Rear admiral	Commodore	Captain	Commander	Lieutenant commander	Lieutenant	Lieutenant (junior grade)	Ensign
Rank group	General / flag officers				Senior officers			Junior officers

=== Enlisted personnel ranks ===
The rank insignia of non-commissioned officers and enlisted personnel.

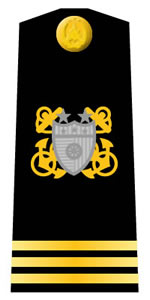
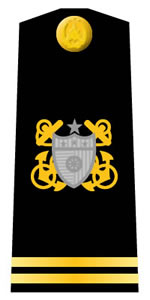
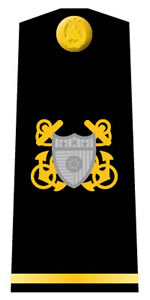
Rank group	Senior NCOs						Junior NCOs	Enlisted
Philippine Army
Philippine Army	Chief master sergeant	Senior master sergeant	Master sergeant	Technical sergeant	Staff sergeant	Sergeant	Corporal	Private first class	Private
Philippine Air Force
Philippine Air Force	Chief master sergeant	Senior master sergeant	Master sergeant	Technical sergeant	Staff sergeant	Sergeant	Airman first class	Airman second class	Airman
Philippine Navy
Philippine Navy	Master chief petty officer	Senior chief petty officer	Chief petty officer	Petty officer, first class	Petty officer, second class	Petty officer, third class	Seaman first class	Seaman second class	Apprentice seaman
Philippine Marine Corps
Philippine Marine Corps	Chief master sergeant	Senior master sergeant	Master sergeant	Technical sergeant	Staff sergeant	Sergeant	Corporal	Private first class	Private
Philippine Coast Guard
Philippine Coast Guard	Master chief petty officer	Senior chief petty officer	Chief petty officer	Petty officer, first class	Petty officer, second class	Petty officer, third class	Seaman first class	Seaman second class	Seaman apprentice
Rank group	Senior NCOs						Junior NCOs	Enlisted

==== Senior appointments ====
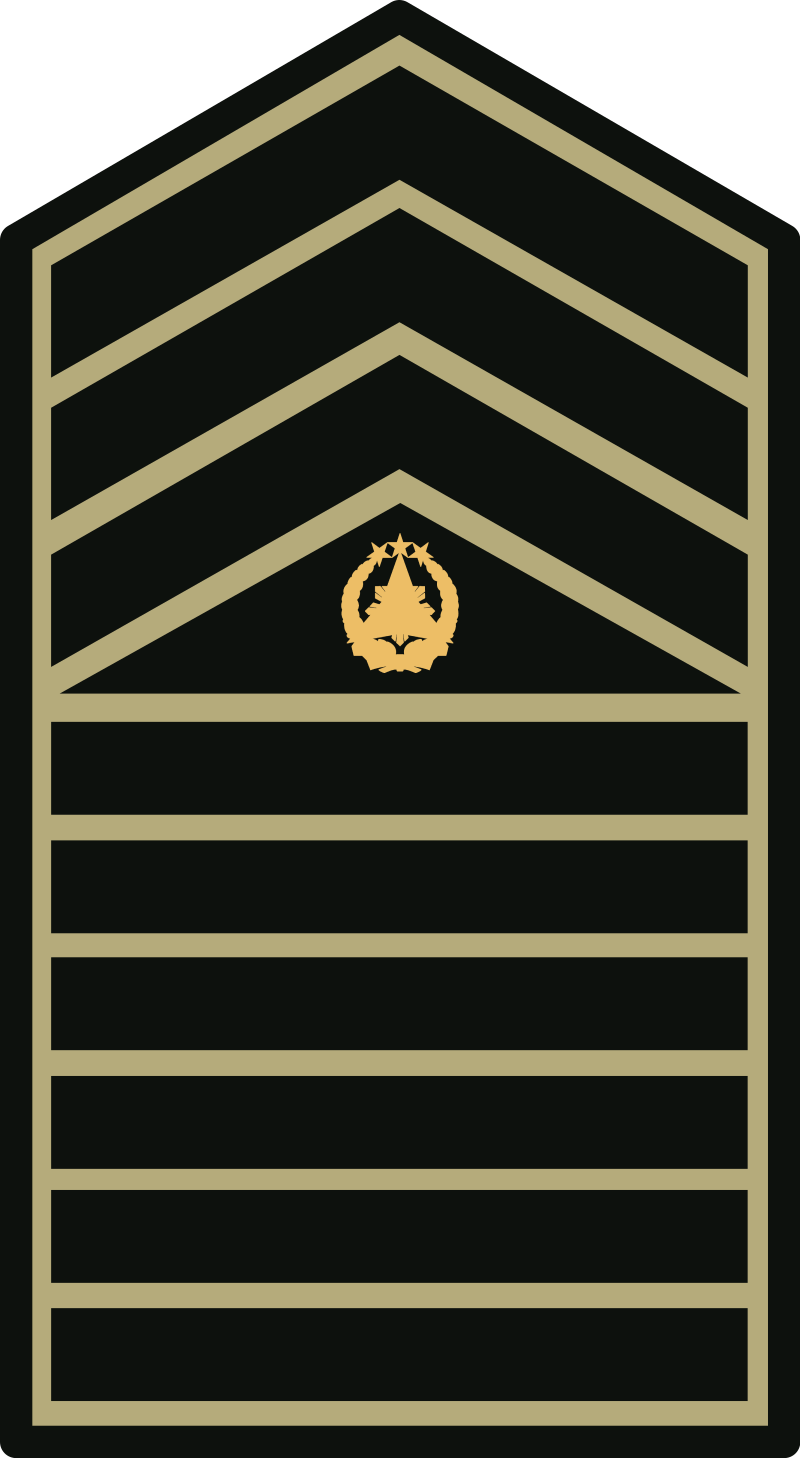
Rank group	Senior appointment
Philippine Army
Philippine Army		First chief master sergeant
Philippine Air Force
Philippine Air Force		First chief master sergeant
Philippine Navy
Philippine Navy	First command master chief petty officer	Command master chief petty officer
Philippine Marine Corps
Philippine Marine Corps	First command sergeant major	Command sergeant major
Philippine Coast Guard
Philippine Coast Guard		First master chief petty officer

== Historic ranks ==
=== Revolutionary Army ranks ===
These rank insignia for the nascent army were created in late 1896, replacing the earlier rank insignia used by the Katipuneros containing the letter K (ka). Ranks were then worn on the sleeves of all uniforms.

Shoulder epaulette insignia was introduced in late 1898, some time after the declaration of Philippine independence. It is worthy of mention that the insignia for the rank of Second Lieutenant and Major has three silver and gold stars, respectively, and the number of stars are reduced when promoted.

==== Officers ====
Rank group	General / flag officers					Senior officers			Junior officers
Shoulder insignia (1899–1901)
Sleeve insignia
English	Generalissimo/Minister marshal	Captain general	Lieutenant general	Divisional general	Brigadier general	Colonel	Lieutenant colonel	Commandant	Captain	First lieutenant	Second lieutenant
Tagalog	Heneralisimo/Ministrong mariskal	Kapitán heneral	Tenyente Heneral	Komandante Heneral	Brigada Heneral	Koronel	Tenyente koronel	Komandante	Kapitán	Tenyente	Alpéres
Spanish	Generalísimo/Ministro mariscal	Capitán general	Teniente general	General de división	General de brigada	Coronel	Teniente coronel	Comandante	Capitán	1^{er} teniente	Alfez

==== Enlisted Personnel ====
Rank group	Senior NCOs	Junior NCOs	Enlisted
Sleeve insignia
English	Sergeant	Corporal	Private	Civil guardsman first class	Civil guardsman
Tagalog	Sarhento	Kabo	Pribato
Spanish	Sargento	Cabo	Privato

=== Rank insignia during the Commonwealth and immediate independence period (until 1954) ===
==== Army and Air Force ====
The Philippine Army during the Commonwealth period as well as after independence - as well as the Air Force beginning 1947 - used essentially the same rank insignias as the United States Army. The main difference is the addition of a rank named third lieutenant and the five-star rank of Field Marshal.

==== Officer ====
10th Grade	9th Grade	8th Grade	7th Grade	6th Grade	5th Grade	4th Grade	3rd Grade	2nd Grade	1st Grade
General	Lieutenant General	Major General	Brigadier General	Colonel	Lieutenant Colonel	Major	Captain	First Lieutenant	Second Lieutenant
GEN	LTG	MG	BG	COL	LTC	MAJ	CPT	1LT	2LT

==== Enlisted ====
US DoD Pay Grade	E-9	E-8	E-7		E-6		E-5		E-4		E-3		E-2	E-1
From 1935	No equivalent													No insignia
From 1935	No equivalent		Master sergeant		First sergeant	Technical sergeant	Staff sergeant		Sergeant		Corporal		Private first class	Private
September 1942	No equivalent													No insignia
September 1942	No equivalent		First sergeant	Master sergeant	Technical sergeant		Staff sergeant	Technician 3rd grade	Sergeant	Technician 4th grade	Corporal	Technician 5th grade	Private first class	Private
August 1948	No equivalent												No insignia	No insignia
August 1948	No equivalent		First sergeant Combat and noncombat	Master sergeant Combat and noncombat	Sergeant first class Combat and noncombat		Sergeant Combat and noncombat		Corporal Combat and noncombat		Private first class Combat and noncombat		Private	Recruit
February 1951	No equivalent												No insignia	No insignia
February 1951	No equivalent		First sergeant	Master sergeant	Sergeant first class		Sergeant		Corporal		Private first class		Private	Recruit

== See also ==
- Cadet rank in the Philippines
- Armed Forces of the Philippines
