= San Antonio Airport (Philippines) =

San Antonio Airport Luparan han San Antonio (Waray) Tugpahanan sa San Antonio (Cebuano) Paliparan ng San Antonio (Filipino)
- IATA: none; ICAO: none

Summary
- Airport type: Public
- Serves: Dalupiri Island
- Location: San Antonio, Northern Samar
- Coordinates: 12°25′04″N 124°16′26″E

Map
- Location in the Philippines

San Antonio Airport, unofficially known as Dalupiri Airport, is an airstrip on the island of Dalupiri, which is part of the municipality of San Antonio, province of Northern Samar in the Eastern Visayas region of the Philippines.

== History ==
Harlin Abayon, the representative of the 1st District of Northern Samar, lobbied for the construction of the airport as early as 1996. The airport's construction was approved and funded by virtue of Republic Act No. 9330, enacted on 8 August 2004. The Department of Transportation and Communications (DOTC) (now Department of Transportation, DOTr) was made the responsible agency for the San Antonio Airport Development Project.

From 2007 to 2009 the amount of funds spent on the airport project totalled ₱30.4 million, spread across four contracts. By 2014 the amount already spent by the government on the airport amounted to around ₱40 million; its status was questioned in the floor of the House of Representatives.

Even though a feasibility study conducted by the DOTC found that the airport was not viable at the time given the low rate of economic internal rate of return, Rep. Abayon argued for its continued construction and was able to secure in the General Appropriations Act of 2016 ₱50 million in funds for the DOTC to acquire the airport site.

== See also ==
- List of airports in the Philippines
