= Human Security Act =

Philippine law

Human Security Act of 2007

Congress of the Philippines
- Long title: An Act to secure the state and protect our people from terrorism
- Citation: Republic Act No. 9372
- Territorial extent: Philippines
- Enacted by: Congress of the Philippines
- Enacted: February 8, 2007
- Signed: March 6, 2007
- Commenced: July 20, 2007
- Bill citation: Republic Act No. 9372

Repealed by
- Anti-Terrorism Act of 2020

Keywords
- terrorism, anti-terrorism legislation
- Status: Repealed

The Human Security Act of 2007, officially designated as Republic Act No. 9372, was a Philippine law that took effect on July 20, 2007. The law, which was watered-down after opposition from some politicians and rights groups feared the legislation would endanger human rights, was aimed at tackling militants, particularly the Abu Sayyaf, in the southern Philippines.

The law defines terrorism a crime of "caus[ing] widespread and extraordinary fear and panic among the populace" and allows authorities to arrest terror suspects without warrants and temporarily detain them without charges for a maximum of three days. Under the law, detained terrorists are entitled to see a lawyer, a priest, a doctor, or family members.

== Background ==
The first anti-terror bill was sponsored in Congress by Senator Juan Ponce Enrile in 1996; the bill that passed was close to Senator Enrile's proposal.

The final version included many amendments by Senator Aquilino Pimentel, Jr. These revisions introduced several amendments and safeguards that have caused the law to be called "toothless" and "watered down". It was ratified by the Senate on February 8, then approved by the House of Representatives during a special session two weeks later on February 19, 2007. It was later signed into law by President Gloria Macapagal Arroyo on March 6. It took effect on July 20, 2007.

The Philippines had long been urged by the United States and other Western countries to bring in stricter anti-terror legislation, citing the presence of al Qaeda-linked extremists who have been blamed for bombings, beheadings, and kidnappings.

== Summary ==
1. The State recognizes that the fight against terrorism requires a comprehensive approach, comprising political, economic, diplomatic, military, and legal means duly taking into account the root causes of terrorism without acknowledging these as justification for terrorist and/or criminal activities. Such measures shall include conflict management and post-conflict peace-building, addressing the roots of conflict by building state capacity and promoting equitable economic development. This statement elucidates that the Philippines government has realized that a strict military approach cannot be adequate solution when dealing with terrorist groups. In this sense, the Philippines government has decided to adopt a broader and more comprehensive approach rather than only applying a military approach.

2. Terrorism is the premeditated or threatened use of violence or force or any other means that deliberately cause harm to persons, or of force and other destructive means against property or the environment, with the intention of creating or sowing a state of danger, panic, fear, or chaos to the general public or segment thereof, or of coercing or intimidating the government to do or refrain from doing an act. The law provides for a clearer definition of terrorism allowing police and security services a better understanding of the crimes at stake. This statement can act as a potential deterrent to future terrorists as they will know that it is no longer possible to commit an attack and escape without being charged.

3. Arrest and Detention. Any peace office or a private person may, without warrant, arrest a person: (a)when, in his presence, the person to be arrested has committed, is actually committing, or attempting to commit any of the offense under this Act; or (b)when any of said offense has in fact been committed and he has reasonable ground to believe that the person to be arrested has committed the same. Any person arrested under this Section may be detained for a period of not more than three(3)days following his arrest for custodial investigation. In previous laws related to anti-terrorism, there were many loopholes that prevented terrorists suspects from being detained. However, this bill clarifies to Philippines Law Enforcement Agencies to arrest suspected terrorists without warrant and bestows the authority to detain suspects for 3 days.

== Supreme Court ruling ==
In a 2010 ruling under Southern Hemisphere Engagement Network et al. v. Anti-Terrorism Council et al., the Supreme Court unanimously ruled that the Human Security Act was constitutional. The court ruled that the petitioners had no legal standing because none of them have been charged under the said law. The Supreme Court ruled with finality on the matter in 2011, affirming its constitutionality.

== International reaction ==
Allies in the United States-led war on terrorism expressed confidence in the Philippines with the signing of the law. In a statement, the US Embassy said "this new law will help provide Philippine law enforcement and judicial authorities with the legal tools they need to confront the threats posed by international terrorism, while ensuring protection and civil liberties and human rights". Australian ambassador Tony Hely hailed the signing of the law and called the Philippines "a key regional counter-terrorism partner" for Australia.

However, the Special Rapporteur of the UN on the promotion and protection of human rights and fundamental freedoms while countering terrorism, Martin Scheinin, issued the following statement; that the Philippine Government should reconsider "Human Security Act of 2007" since implementation of this law can negatively affect the human rights. He stated that even though there are some positive aspects of this law, an overly broad definition can be incompatible with Article 15 of the International Covenant on Civil and Political Rights (ICCPR).

== Anti-Terrorism Act of 2020 ==
During the presidency of Rodrigo Duterte, the Senate approved Senate Bill No. 1083 on February 26, 2020, and later the House of Representative approved House Bill No. 6875 on June 3, 2020. Both bills sought to amend the Human Security Act by imposing stronger measures to combat terrorism but has garnered criticism from human rights advocates who say the law will curtail civil liberties and be prone to constitutional abuse.

Senator Panfilo Lacson, one of the principal authors of the new law, said that the Human Security Act of 2007 was a "dead letter law" because it has been "severely underutilized" as it only resulted in a single convicted felon and had only one prescribed organization, the Abu Sayyaf.

== See also ==
- Laws of the 13th Congress of the Philippines
