= Anjo World =

Amusement park in Cebu, Philippines

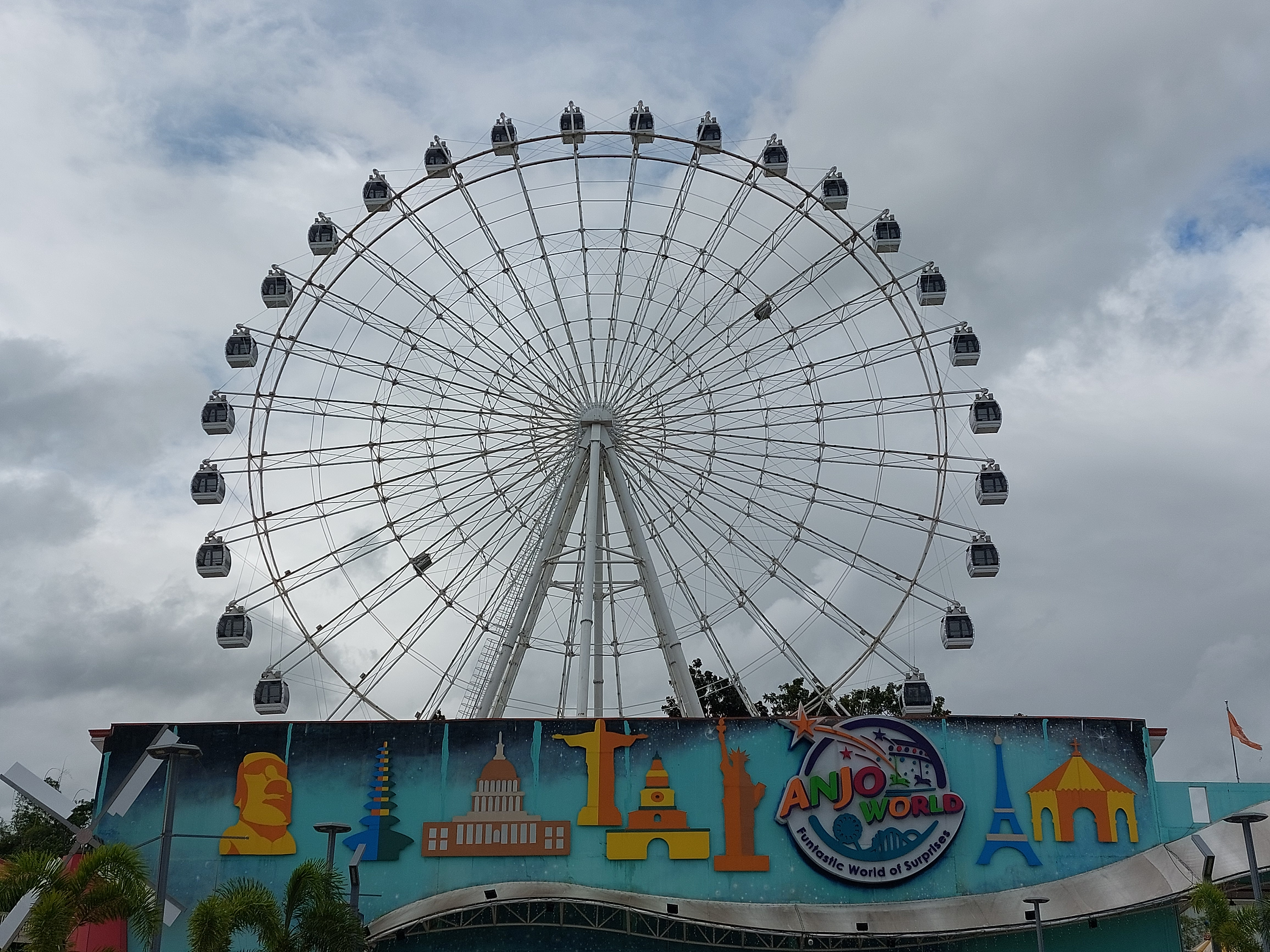
- View of the Ferris wheel at Anjo World
- Interactive map of Anjo World
- Location: Belmont One, Minglanilla, Cebu, Philippines
- Coordinates: 10°14′58″N 123°48′00″E
- Status: Operating
- Opened: 21 December 2018; 7 years ago
- Owner: Cebu Belmont Inc.
- Theme: Continents of the World
- Slogan: Funtastic World of Surprises Cebu’s First World-Class Theme Park
- Area: 1.5 hectares (3.7 acres)

Attractions
- Total: 14 (as of 11/2022)
- Roller coasters: 1 (The Pharaoh)
- Website: www.anjoworld.com

Anjo World is an amusement park in Barangay Calajo-an in Minglanilla, Cebu, Philippines. It is the largest theme park in the Visayas.

== History ==
The realization of the project for the Anjo World Theme Park took five years. The amusement park is situated inside Belmont One, a mixed used development in Minglanilla, Cebu described as the "first integrated family entertainment complex in Visayas and Mindanao" by its proponents. The name of the theme park was derived from the names of the parents of Chester Lim, Belmont One's president; Antonio and Josiefe Lim.

The groundbreaking ceremony of the whole Belmont One complex took place in September 2018. The theme park itself had its soft opening a few months later on December 22, 2018, with six of its twelve rides initially made operational.

== Park layout and design ==
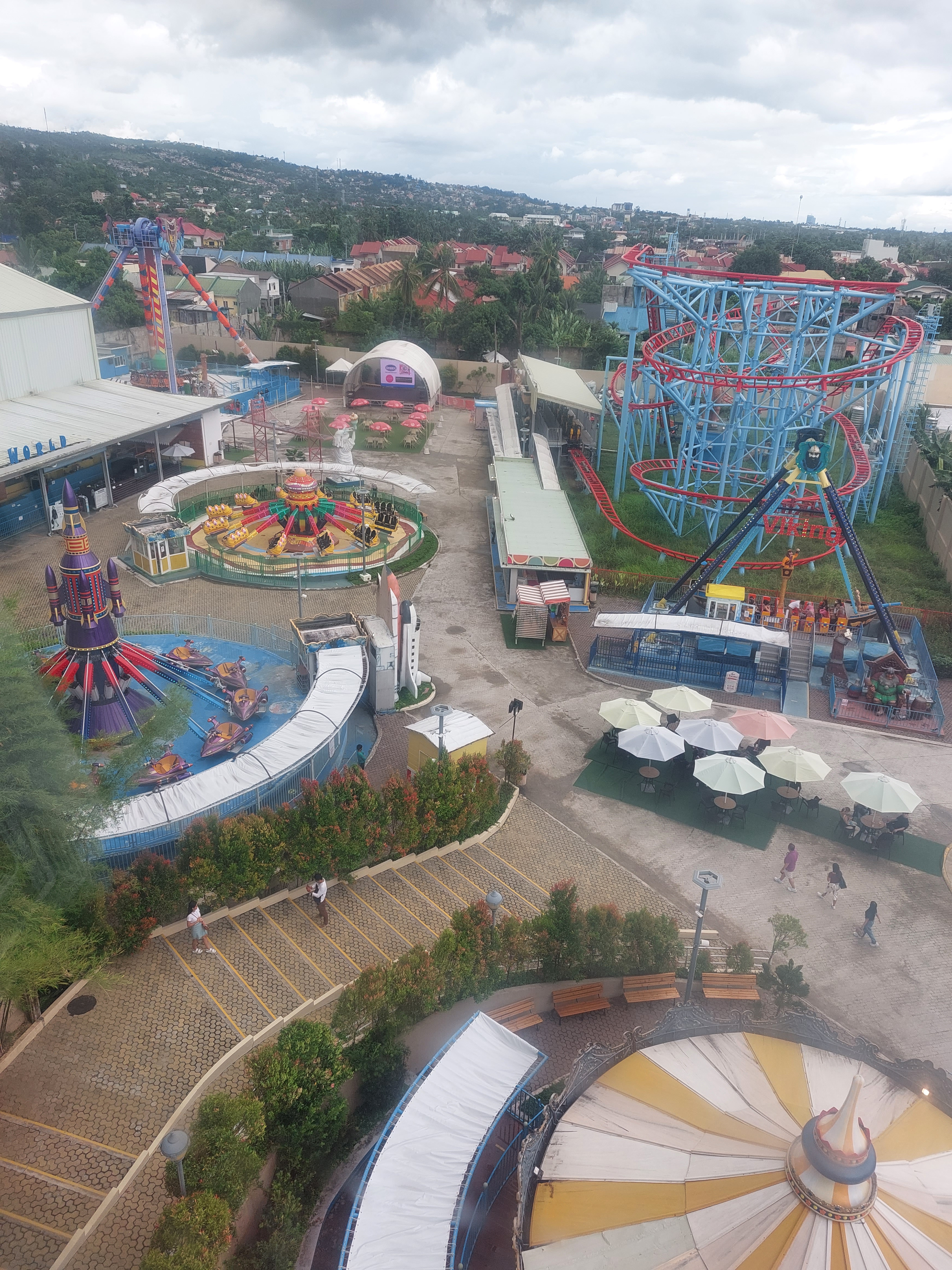
Aerial view

Anjo World covers an area of 1.5 hectares (3.7 acres) and is divided into four different zones namely: Africa, Americas, Asia, and Europe. The four zones are inspired by the continents of the same name in the case of all zones but "America", which was inspirated from the super continent of the Americas.

The parking facilities of the theme park can accommodate up to 200 vehicles.

=== Attractions ===
Attraction rides of Anjo World were bought from manufacturers who are members of the International Association of Amusement Parks and Attractions. Among the attractions of the theme park is the Spinning Coaster or The Pharaoh, a 60.96 m (200.0 ft) Ferris wheel or the Anjo Eye, Boomerang, Hip Hop, Bumper Boats, a 25 m (82 ft) Tower Drop, Carousel, Mr. Toad, Mr. Cup, London Taxi, Space Shuttle, and the Viking.

Anjo World also features an attraction called Snow World Cebu, which is hosted in a two-story building. It features ice sculptures, ice slide, and snow and has the capacity to accommodate 500 people.

Anjo World recently opened Funtastic Arena during their anniversary last November 2022. An indoor family attraction that includes 3 new kiddie rides, more than 15 arcade games, and a 70-seat party area.

== Affiliation ==
The amusement park is a member of the International Association of Amusement Parks and Attractions.

== See also ==
- Enchanted Kingdom
- Star City (amusement park)
