= Minglanilla =

Municipality in Cebu, Philippines

Minglanilla Buat
- Municipality
- Municipality of Minglanilla
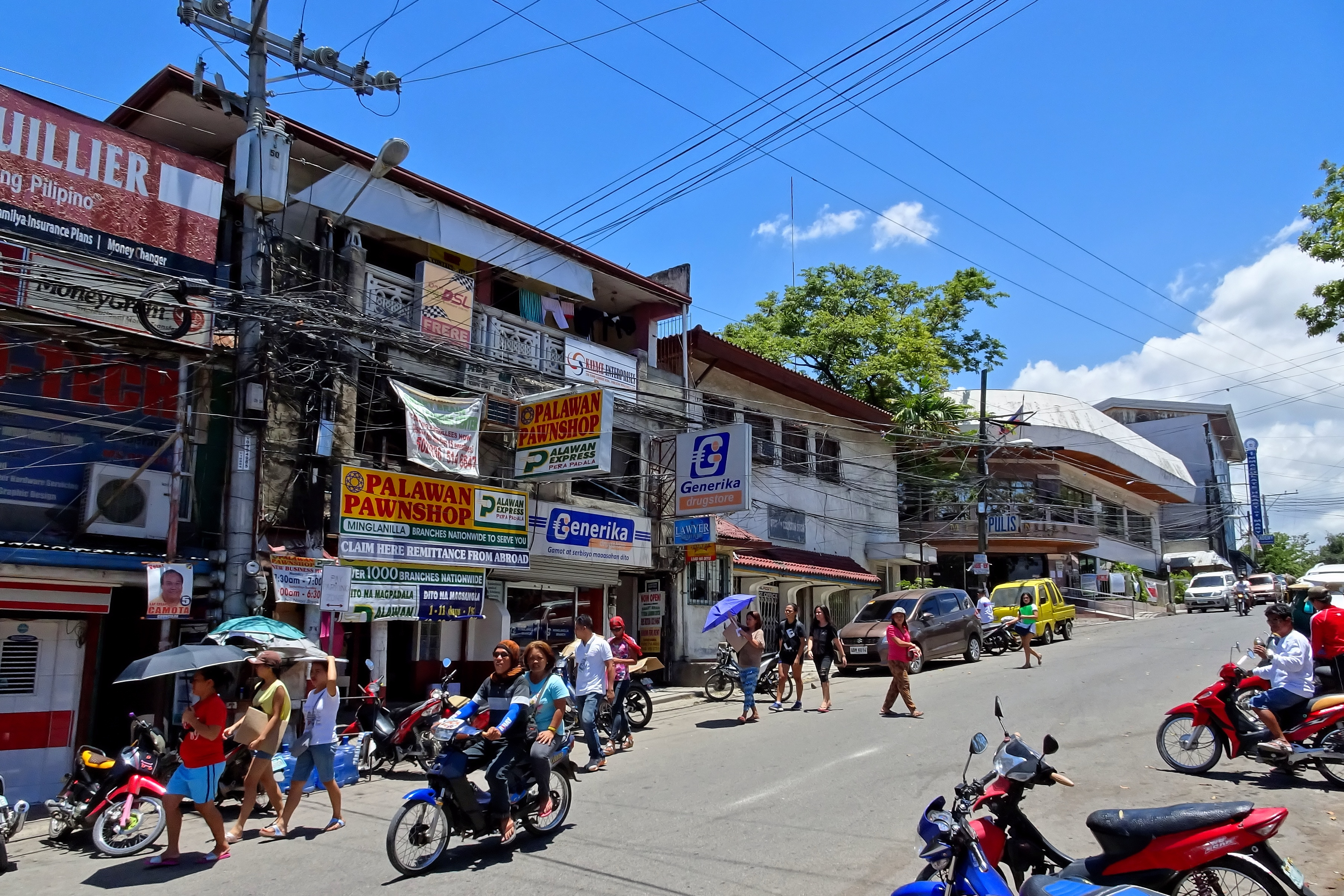
- Downtown of Minglanilla

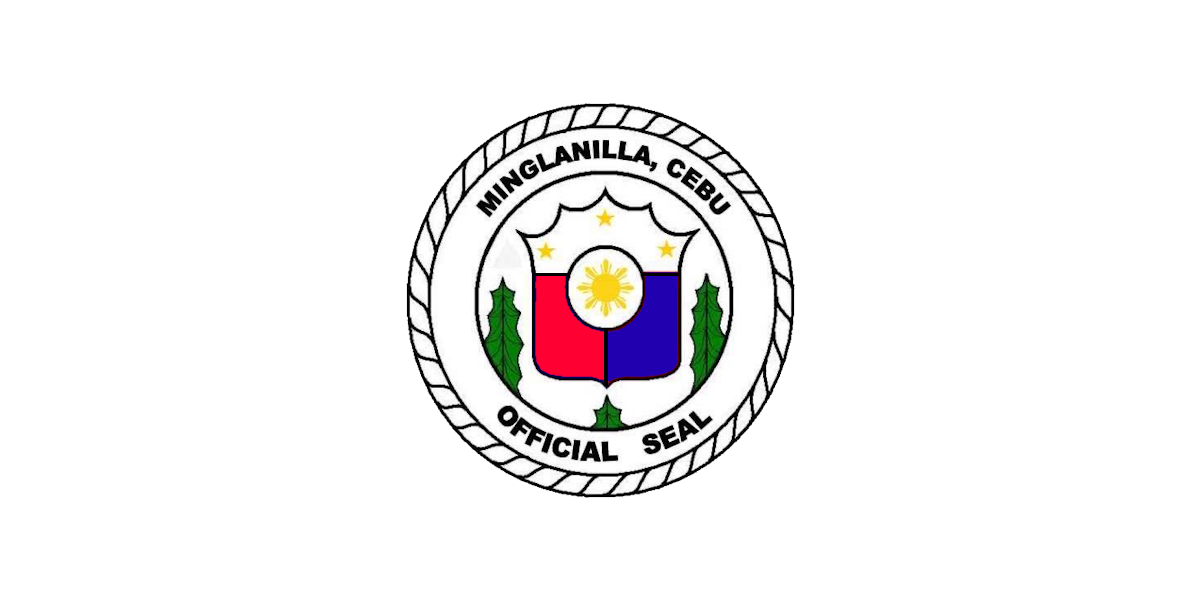
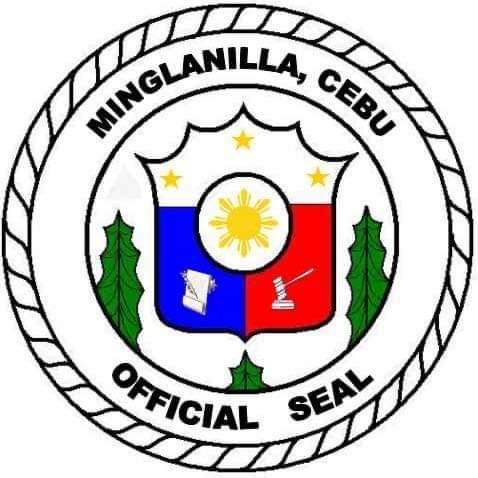
- Flag Seal
- Anthem: Mabuhi ka Minglanilla (lit. Long Live Minglanilla)
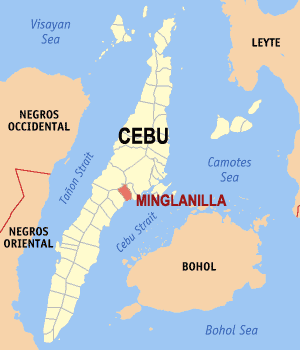
- Map of Cebu with Minglanilla highlighted
- Interactive map of Minglanilla
- Location within the Philippines
- Coordinates: 10°14′42″N 123°47′47″E
- Country: Philippines
- Region: Central Visayas
- Province: Cebu
- District: 1st district
- Founded: 1858
- Barangays: 19 (see Barangays)

Government
  - Type: Sangguniang Bayan
  - Mayor: Rajiv V. Enad (NP)
  - Vice Mayor: Elanito A. Peña (NP)
  - Representative: Rhea Mae A. Gullas
  - Municipal Council: Members: Oscar C. de la Calzada Jr.; Jenny Z. Young; Samuel G. Adlawan Jr.; Jesus D. Velez; Jenifer D. Lariosa; Proserfina Laput-Fajutrao; Jeremias L. Cañares; Jaime S. Caumeran
  - Electorate: 80,580 voters (2025)

Area
  - Total: 65.60 km^{2} (25.33 sq mi)
- Elevation: 64 m (210 ft)
- Highest elevation: 395 m (1,296 ft)
- Lowest elevation: 0 m (0 ft)

Population (2024 census)
  - Total: 155,934
  - Density: 2,377/km^{2} (6,157/sq mi)
  - Households: 37,023

Economy
  - Income class: 1st municipal income class
  - Poverty incidence: 11.55% (2023)
  - Revenue: ₱ 689.3 million (2024)
  - Assets: ₱ 2,539 million (2024)
  - Expenditure: ₱ 528.7 million (2024)
  - Liabilities: ₱ 1,012 million (2024)

Service provider
  - Electricity: Visayan Electric Company (VECO)
- Time zone: UTC+8 (PST)
- ZIP code: 6046
- PSGC: 072232000
- IDD : area code: +63 (0)32
- Native language: Cebuano

Minglanilla, officially the Municipality of Minglanilla (Cebuano: Lungsod sa Minglanilla; Tagalog: Bayan ng Minglanilla), is a municipality in the province of Cebu, Philippines. According to the 2024 census, it has a population of 155,934 people.

It is known as the "Sugat Capital of the South" (where "Sugat" means "meeting" or "welcome" in Cebuano). A big event in Minglanilla is the Sugat, which attracts people from adjacent towns as well as from Cebu city and further afield. On Black Saturday night, a public dance is held at the church plaza to witness the re‑enactment of the "meeting" of the risen Christ and his mother. Their images, borne on richly decorated carrozas, meet amidst joyous songs and the presence of child angels suspended by wires. The Kabanhawan (Cebuano for "Resurrection") festival is held annually on Easter Sunday.

== History ==
Father Sanchez, Minglanilla's first parish priest, is credited as the founder of the town in 1858. The roads and bridges were built by the same Fr. Sanchez together with Fr. Magaz. There were a number of capitanes who headed the town during the Spanish era. The first capitan was Hilario Castañares. During the American regime the first was Canuto Larrobis. The first elected municipal mayor was Gregorio de la Calzada.

Buat was the former name of Minglanilla. It was the place where early settlers dried (buad/buat) their sea catches. But in 1858, it was renamed by Fr. Sanchez after a municipality called Minglanilla in Castilla–La Mancha, Spain.

The town suffered setbacks, among them during the Philippine Revolution of 1896-1898 when insurrectos burned down its municipal building and looted many houses. This event is remembered by a street named 18 de Julio (July 18). In 1942, its poblacion was razed to the ground by the Japanese in retaliation for the presence of the guerrillas in the town.

== Geography ==
Minglanilla is located 15 kilometres (9.3 mi) south of Cebu City. It is bordered to the north by Talisay City, to the west is Toledo City, to the east is the Cebu Strait, and to the south is Naga City. Its land area is 65.6 km^{2} (25.3 sq mi).

Minglanilla lies within Metro Cebu.

=== Barangays ===
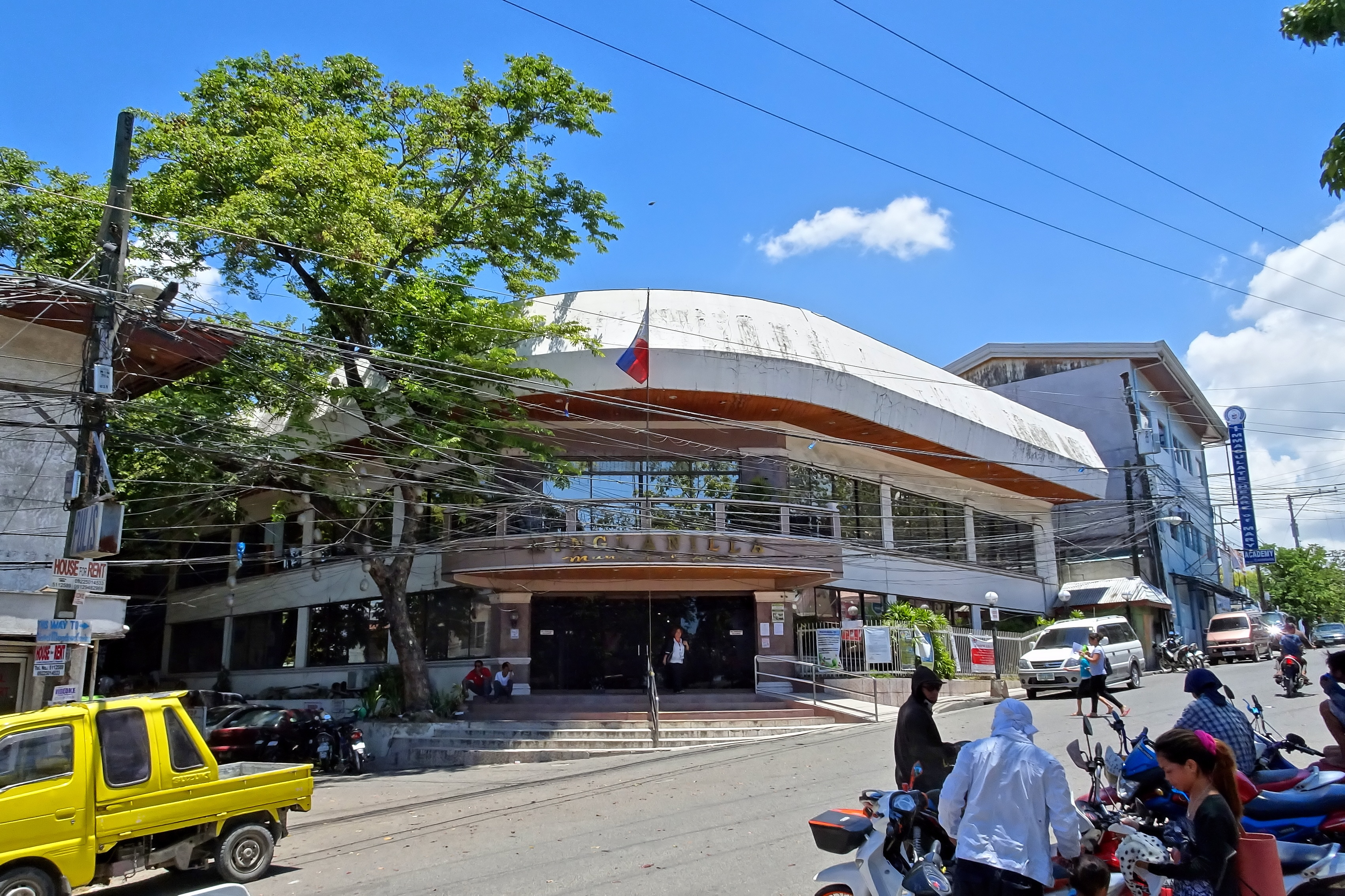
Minglanilla municipal hall

Minglanilla is politically subdivided into 19 barangays. Each barangay consists of puroks and some have sitios.

PSGC	Barangay	Population			±% p.a.	
		2024		2010		
072232001	Cadulawan	3.4%	5,321	3,986	▴	2.03%
072232002	Calajo‑an	7.4%	11,583	10,181	▴	0.90%
072232003	Camp 7	1.6%	2,571	2,279	▴	0.84%
072232004	Camp 8	1.2%	1,798	1,946	▾	−0.55%
072232005	Cuanos	1.8%	2,809	2,499	▴	0.82%
072232006	Guindaruhan	2.2%	3,503	2,707	▴	1.81%
072232007	Linao (Linao-Lipata)	8.3%	12,943	11,432	▴	0.87%
072232008	Manduang	1.4%	2,147	1,968	▴	0.61%
072232009	Pakigne	8.1%	12,644	11,463	▴	0.68%
072232010	Poblacion Ward 1	1.3%	2,087	1,987	▴	0.34%
072232011	Poblacion Ward 2	2.1%	3,254	2,950	▴	0.68%
072232012	Poblacion Ward 3	1.8%	2,884	2,765	▴	0.29%
072232013	Poblacion Ward 4	3.1%	4,767	3,650	▴	1.87%
072232014	Tubod	3.6%	5,626	4,666	▴	1.31%
072232015	Tulay	7.2%	11,286	9,775	▴	1.00%
072232016	Tunghaan	9.1%	14,187	13,389	▴	0.40%
072232019	Tungkil	8.4%	13,109	10,789	▴	1.36%
072232017	Tungkop	7.1%	11,003	7,589	▴	2.61%
072232018	Vito	5.5%	8,613	7,157	▴	1.29%
	Total		155,934	113,178	▴	2.25%

Tunghaan remains the most populous barangay in Minglanilla, while Tungkil was the second most populous and Calajo-an is the third most populous of barangays.

=== Climate ===
Climate data for Minglanilla, Cebu
Month	Jan	Feb	Mar	Apr	May	Jun	Jul	Aug	Sep	Oct	Nov	Dec	Year
Mean daily maximum °C (°F)	28 (82)	29 (84)	30 (86)	31 (88)	31 (88)	30 (86)	30 (86)	30 (86)	30 (86)	29 (84)	29 (84)	28 (82)	30 (85)
Mean daily minimum °C (°F)	23 (73)	23 (73)	23 (73)	24 (75)	25 (77)	25 (77)	25 (77)	25 (77)	25 (77)	25 (77)	24 (75)	23 (73)	24 (75)
Average precipitation mm (inches)	70 (2.8)	49 (1.9)	62 (2.4)	78 (3.1)	138 (5.4)	201 (7.9)	192 (7.6)	185 (7.3)	192 (7.6)	205 (8.1)	156 (6.1)	111 (4.4)	1,639 (64.6)
Average rainy days	13.4	10.6	13.1	14.5	24.2	27.9	28.4	27.7	27.1	27.4	22.5	15.9	252.7
Source: Meteoblue

The climate of Minglanilla is classified as Coronas type III, characterized by a dry season lasting from one to six months. There is no pronounced maximum rain period. The town is placed within the tropical rainforest type of world climate (Köppen type: Af) which has uniform high temperature and heavy precipitation distribution throughout the year.

== Demographics ==
Population census of Minglanilla
Year	Pop.	±% p.a.
1903	10,518	—
1918	12,590	+1.21%
1939	15,295	+0.93%
1948	15,774	+0.34%
1960	20,083	+2.03%
1970	28,880	+3.70%
1975	32,224	+2.22%
1980	38,504	+3.62%
1990	50,875	+2.83%
1995	62,523	+3.94%
2000	77,268	+4.64%
2007	101,585	+3.85%
2010	113,178	+4.01%
2015	132,135	+2.99%
2020	151,002	+2.85%
2024	155,934	+0.77%
Source: Philippine Statistics Authority

== Economy ==
Poverty incidence of Minglanilla (%)

Source: Philippine Statistics Authority

Minglanilla lies in Metro Cebu.

It is primarily a residential town, with most of its population commuting to Cebu City for work. Owing to its close location to Cebu City, which is only 15 kilometres (9.3 mi) away from the municipality, it hosts many subdivisions.

Prior to its suburbanization, Minglanilla's primary industry were agriculture and fishing. However, since the 2000s, when the municipality saw developments trickle down from Cebu City due to the city's own economic boom, the municipality has shifted into having a more service-driven economy.

Anjo World Theme Park is located in Barangay Calajo-an. It is the first amusement park in Cebu, and is located in the larger Belmont One development, which hosts a supermarket, a hardware, restaurants, among other retail components, also located within Barangay Calajo-an.

The Minglanilla Techno-Business Park is a 100 hectares (1.0 km^{2}) development which will be built on reclaimed land along the coast of the municipality's Tulay and Calajo-an barangays. It is envisioned primarily to host light industries, but also to other mixed-use developments as well, and is scheduled for completion by 2024.

== Culture ==
=== Churches ===
Roman Catholic Parishes

- Archdiocesan Shrine of the Immaculate Heart of Mary
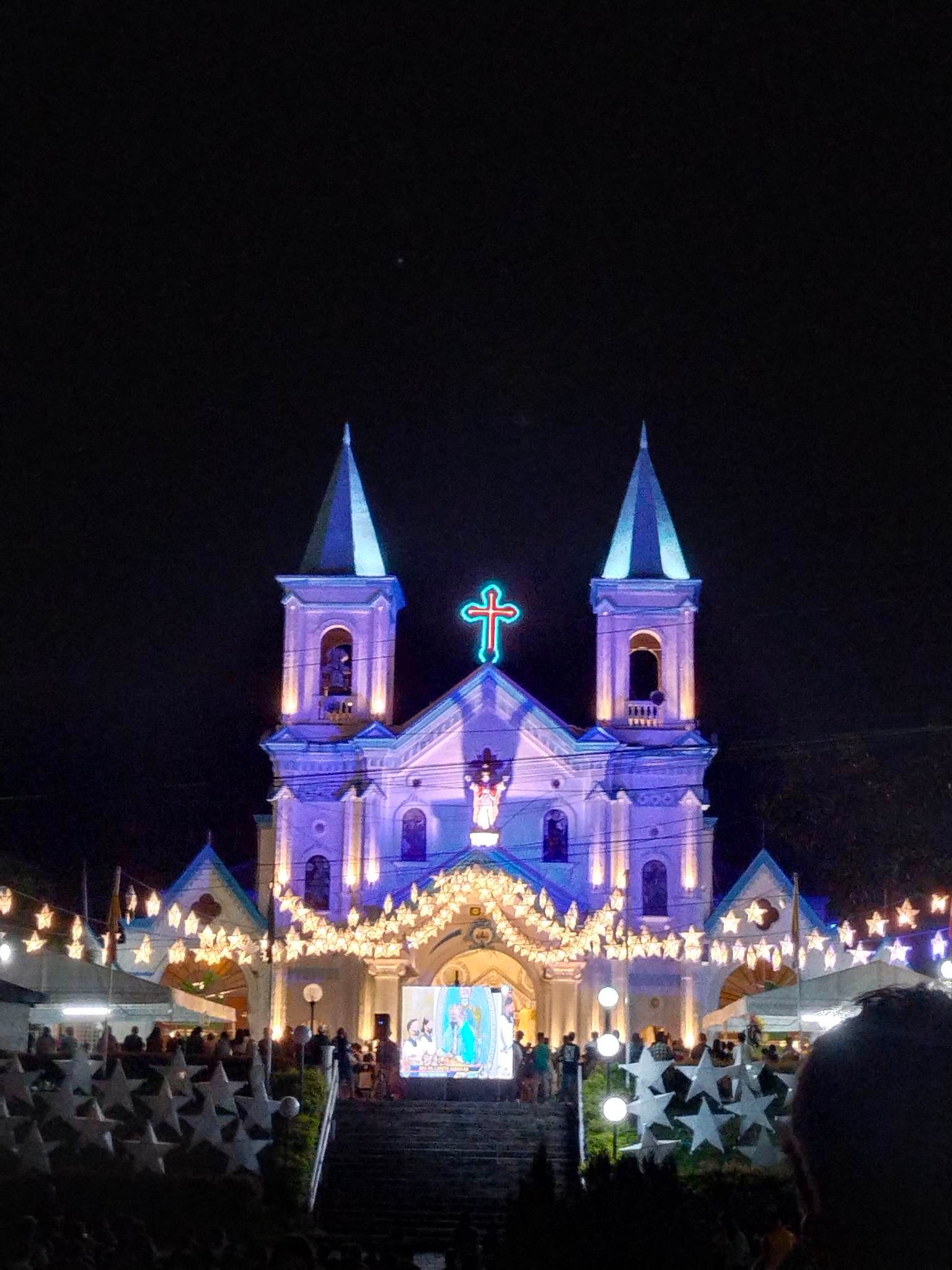
  Archdiocesan Shrine of the Immaculate Heart of Mary illuminated at night
  Poblacion
- San Roque Parish, Linao-Lipata
- Our Lady of the Holy Rosary Parish Tungkop
- Parroquia de Virgen de los Remedios Guindarohan

=== Festivals ===
- Sugat–Kabanhawan festival (Easter Feast of Resurrection)

In its devotion to the celebration of Christ's resurrection, the municipality of Minglanilla has long held the distinction of being the "Sugat Capital of the south". Annually held every Easter Sunday, the occasion primarily focuses on the re‑enactment of the meeting of the Risen Christ and the Sorrowful Mother – followed by a string of activities and events scheduled to take place throughout the day. As one of the biggest annually celebrated occasions of the municipality, the festival takes a direct translation in celebrating Christ's resurrection, with street dancing, a wide assortment of day games, and entertainment features. Essentially a socio-religious event, celebrations have played the role of host to a diverse range of organized contests, competitions, and games, including a carabao race, a Burda-making contest (Burda = embroidery), and a mud volleyball tournament. Easter-egg hunts also are part of Sugat-Kabanhawan festivals, just as the street dancing and the ritual showdown have become mainstay staples of the festival's overall program flow.

== Notable personalities ==
- Morissette, singer
- Golden Cañedo, singer
- Deanna Wong, volleyball player
- Roger Pogoy, basketball player
