= San Antonio, Northern Samar =

Municipality in Northern Samar, Philippines

San Antonio Dalupiri
- Municipality
- Municipality of San Antonio
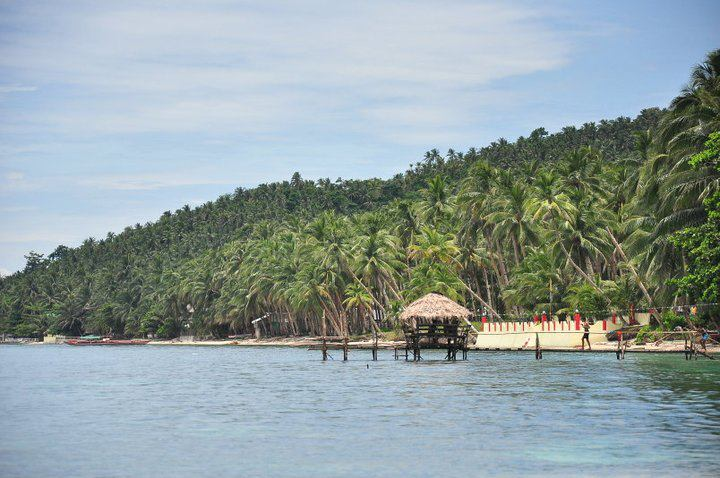
- Dalupiri Island

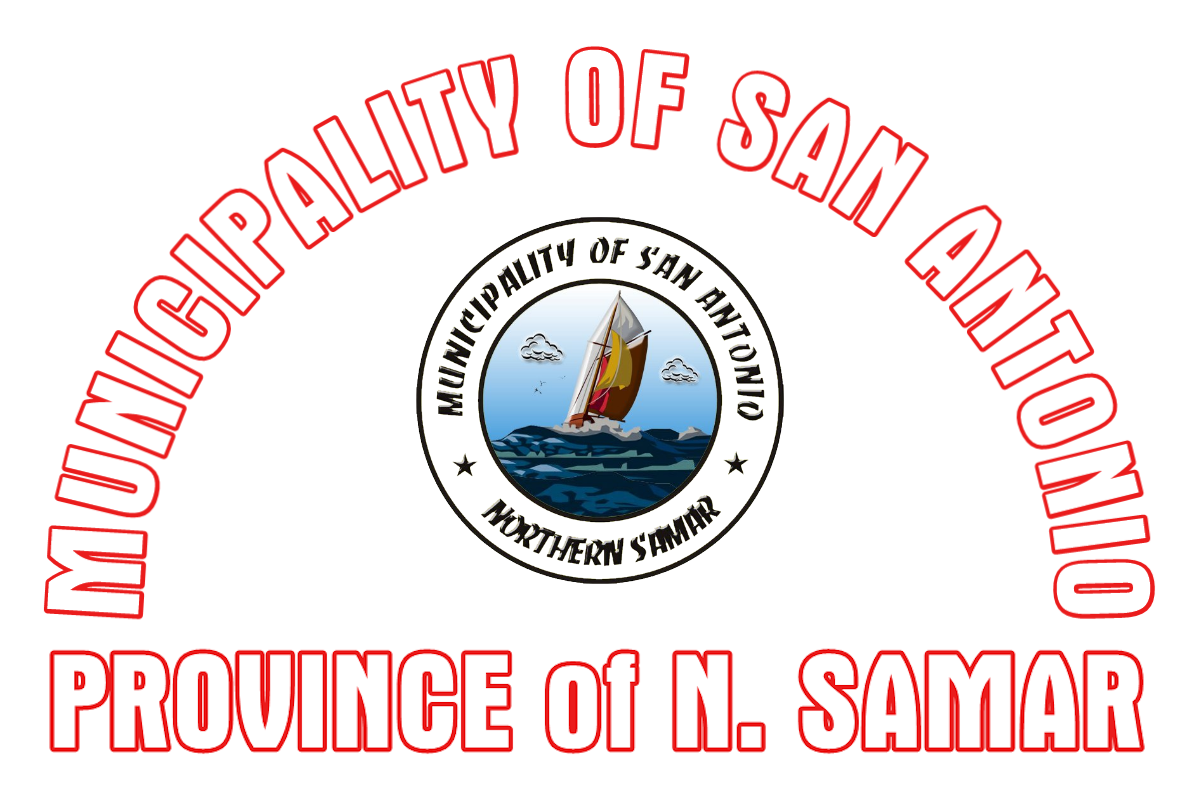
- Flag

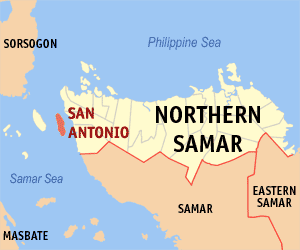
- Map of Northern Samar with San Antonio highlighted
- Interactive map of San Antonio
- Location within the Philippines
- Coordinates: 12°24′50″N 124°16′44″E
- Country: Philippines
- Region: Eastern Visayas
- Province: Northern Samar
- District: 1st district
- Founded: 1904
- Named for: St. Anthony of Padua
- Barangays: 10 (see Barangays)

Government
  - Type: Sangguniang Bayan
  - Mayor: Manuel M. Esponilla
  - Vice Mayor: Rudy S. Baguioso
  - Representative: Paul R. Daza
  - Councilors: List: • Rhoda G. Lucero; • Zosimo A. Agaton; • Mark Neil N. Formaran; • Ruel C. Solana; • Nelson M. Obeda; • Nelita N. Ang; • Flordeliza J. Esquilon; • Thelma D. Serato; DILG Masterlist of Officials
  - Electorate: 7,159 voters (2025)

Area
  - Total: 27.00 km^{2} (10.42 sq mi)
- Elevation: 20 m (66 ft)
- Highest elevation: 626 m (2,054 ft)
- Lowest elevation: 0 m (0 ft)

Population (2024 census)
  - Total: 8,904
  - Density: 329.8/km^{2} (854.1/sq mi)
  - Households: 2,057

Economy
  - Income class: 5th municipal income class
  - Poverty incidence: 23.85% (2023)
  - Revenue: ₱ 79.46 million (2024)
  - Assets: ₱ 176.1 million (2024)
  - Expenditure: ₱ 79.6 million (2024)
  - Liabilities: ₱ 43.54 million (2024)

Service provider
  - Electricity: Northern Samar Electric Cooperative (NORSAMELCO)
- Time zone: UTC+8 (PST)
- ZIP code: 6407
- PSGC: 0804817000
- IDD : area code: +63 (0)55
- Native languages: Cebuano; Waray; Tagalog
- Website: www.sanantonio-nsamar.gov.ph

San Antonio, officially the Municipality of San Antonio (Waray: Bungto san San Antonio; Cebuano: Lungsod sa San Antonio; Tagalog: Bayan ng San Antonio), is a municipality in the province of Northern Samar, Philippines. According to the 2024 census, it has a population of 8,882 people.

Its territory is coterminous with Dalupiri Island, just off the western coast of Samar Island at the south end of the San Bernardino Strait. The island's white beaches are considered an "undisturbed paradise" and future "premier tourist destination" in the Eastern Visayas region. San Antonio is also unique, as it is the only municipality in Northern Samar that also speaks Cebuano due to the influx of Boholano and Cebuano settlers in the past. The locals speak Waray which is the predominant language of Northern Samar and it is the main lingua franca in the island.

== History ==
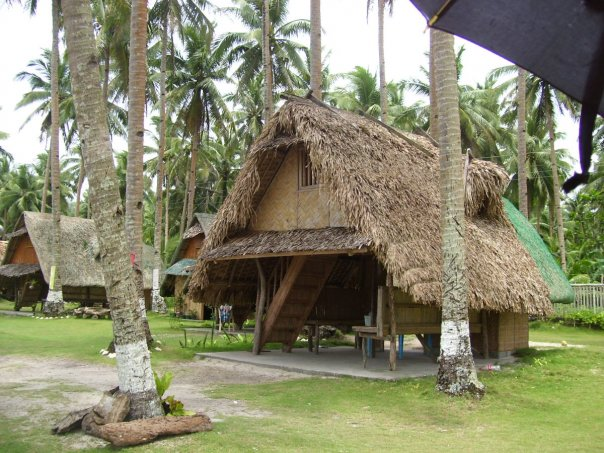
Payag

In the early 19th century the settlers from the mainland of Samar found the island an ideal ground for fishing and bird hunting. They come to the island just to catch fish and hunt birds and go back to the mainland of Samar after a handful of catch. People from Bohol and Cebu came to the island in the second half of the 19th century and introduced a method of catching fish using net, commonly known as "laya". With its introduction, the name "Manoglaya" was born, which literally means mano nga paraglaya or "fishermen using laya".

As new settlers came and built new communities in the island, they called the island as "Sugod-sugod", a Cebuano derivative meaning "just to start or begin". Later, name was changed to "Matabia", referring to the knife-shape of the island. No one knows now why it was changed that way, neither folklores nor historical data reveal the ways and wherefore of the change of its name to Dalupiri Island.

In 1904, San Antonio was established as a municipality of the province of Samar. It was named after its patron saint Anthony of Padua. Following the 1965 Samar division plebiscite, it became part of the province of Northern Samar.

== Geography ==
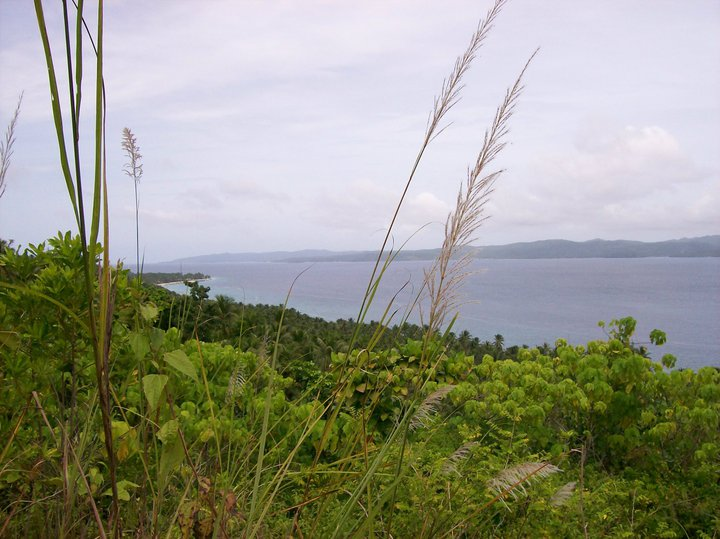
Dalipiri top view

Dalupiri Island lies in the east central periphery of the Philippine archipelago. It is bounded by San Bernardino Strait in the north and east, Samar Sea in the south, and Capul Island in west. It is approximately 5 nautical miles (9.3 km; 5.8 mi) from the Pacific Ocean and sits near the entrance along the Paso de Acapulco, otherwise known as San Bernardino Strait. It has 28 kilometers (17 mi) long white sand beach around the island.

Dalupiri Island is a 2,700-hectare (6,700-acre) of gently rolling hills, mostly of coconut vegetation and shrubbery. It is home to white beaches, caves, and the Lagbangan Lake.

=== Topography ===
The island is composed largely of low and extremely rugged hills and small lowland areas. The island is endowed with relatively rich and fertile soil that allow most crops to be cultivated, but presently it is utilized mostly for coconut plantations.

The highest point of the island is in its central southern portion with a maximum elevation of 35 meters (115 ft) above sea level.

=== Climate ===
The island has no distinct dry or wet season but it has pronounced rainfall from October to January. The heaviest precipitation occurs in November. May is relatively the driest month.

Climate data for San Antonio, Northern Samar
Month	Jan	Feb	Mar	Apr	May	Jun	Jul	Aug	Sep	Oct	Nov	Dec	Year
Mean daily maximum °C (°F)	27 (81)	28 (82)	29 (84)	30 (86)	31 (88)	30 (86)	29 (84)	29 (84)	29 (84)	29 (84)	29 (84)	28 (82)	29 (84)
Mean daily minimum °C (°F)	22 (72)	22 (72)	22 (72)	22 (72)	24 (75)	24 (75)	24 (75)	24 (75)	24 (75)	24 (75)	23 (73)	23 (73)	23 (74)
Average precipitation mm (inches)	84 (3.3)	59 (2.3)	58 (2.3)	55 (2.2)	93 (3.7)	133 (5.2)	149 (5.9)	125 (4.9)	155 (6.1)	165 (6.5)	140 (5.5)	136 (5.4)	1,352 (53.3)
Average rainy days	18.1	13.6	15.8	16.1	21.7	25.5	26.6	25.1	24.8	25.8	22.7	20.1	255.9
Source: Meteoblue

=== Barangays ===
San Antonio is politically subdivided into 10 barangays. Each barangay consists of puroks and some have sitios.

- Burabod
- Dalupirit
- Manraya
- Pilar
- Rizal
- San Nicolas
- Vinisitahan
- Ward I (Poblacion)
- Ward II (Poblacion)
- Ward III (Poblacion)

The town center (poblacion) is divided into three small barangays: Poblacion Ward I, Poblacion Ward II, and Poblacion Ward III.

Barangay San Nicolas, named after its patron Saint Nicolas, is home to picturesque rock formation along the coast. Barangay Rizal is home to a solar spring and cave. Barangay Pilar is the southernmost tip of the island where a fish sanctuary is located. This is the home of palatable seashells and other seafood.

Barangay Burabod's major livelihood is boatbuilding, fishing, copra and dynamite blasting cap manufacturing.

== Demographics ==
Population census of San Antonio
Year	Pop.	±% p.a.
1903	2,059	—
1918	3,994	+4.52%
1939	6,421	+2.29%
1948	6,781	+0.61%
1960	5,898	−1.16%
1970	6,291	+0.65%
1975	7,250	+2.89%
1980	7,008	−0.68%
1990	7,164	+0.22%
1995	7,984	+2.05%
2000	7,915	−0.19%
2007	8,151	+0.41%
2010	8,877	+3.15%
2015	9,058	+0.39%
2020	8,882	−0.41%
Source: Philippine Statistics Authority

== Economy ==
Poverty incidence of San Antonio (%)

Source: Philippine Statistics Authority

San Antonio is one of the manufacturing centers of dynamite chemicals like ammonium nitrate, used in the manufacture of blasting caps that are sold in the other provinces of Samar island. It was learned that the island has been tagged by the police as one of the areas in the manufacture of the dynamite blasting caps.

Chief Supt. Abner Cabalquinto, Regional VIII Police Director, disclosed that the police operatives in Northern Samar confiscated 50 bags of ammonium nitrate in the town of San Antonio. However, the suspects were able to escape and alluded arrest by the police.

Because of the prevalence of homemade dynamite, blast fishing is a perennial problem in the region. In 1994, an Italian tourist was killed and another severely injured while diving when a local fisherman dropped his dynamite on top of them. As a result, the Flying Dog Beach Resort, established in the early 1990s, decided to cease its operation.

The Dalupiri Ocean Power Plant is a proposed tidal fence generating station across the Dalupiri Passage between the islands of Dalupiri and Samar.

== Tourism ==
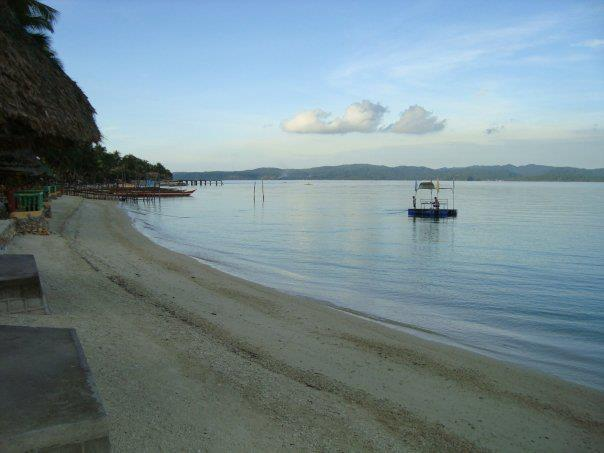
Dalupiri Beach

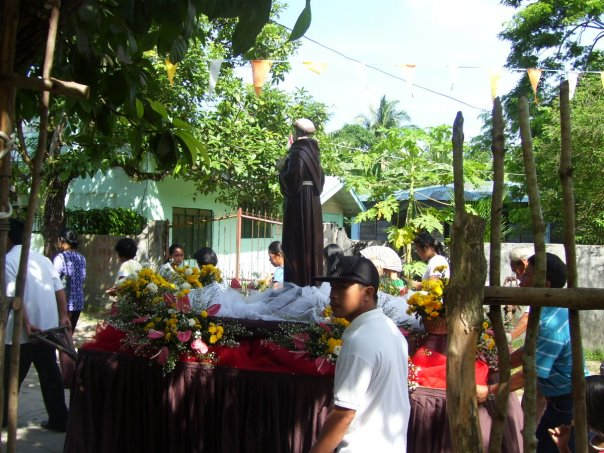
San Antonio de Padua Festival

Because of Dalupiri Island's pristine white sand beach, Republic Act No. 9458 declared San Antonio, together with the island towns of Biri, Capul, and San Vicente, as eco-tourism zones in May 2007.

With its coral reefs, Dalupiri island is ideal for scuba diving, snorkeling, sailing, yachting, jet skiing, para-sailing and marine life observation.

=== Manoglaya Festival ===
A cultural-tourism festival held in the town of San Antonio from the 9th to the 12th of June annually, celebrating the fishing skills of the townfolks. The festival composed of cultural performances, street dance, beauty search and exhibit complemented with “sugod-sugod sa plaza”, a nightly entertainment of music and other performances from leading local performers in the community.

== Transportation ==
=== Airport ===
Dalupiri Airport, also known as San Antonio Airport, is an airstrip in San Antonio in the Eastern Visayas region of Philippines. Its construction was approved by the Senate and House of Representatives of the Philippines on August 8, 2004. This airport is still under constructions and not yet operational to the general public, local resident and Island tourist.

=== Seaport ===
San Antonio town proper Seaport the central part of the island premier gateway to the seaport of the town of Victoria. This two seaports are the busiest port connecting the Island and the mainland of Samar, providing main transport system to the island tourist and local resident.

There are also several seaport in the nearby barangay that also the gateway of the Island to the mainland land of Samar, in northern part of the island is the Vinisitahan Seaport and the western coast is the Dalupiri Seaport both to seaport in the town of Allen, Northern Samar and in the southern coast of the Island is the Burabod Seaport to the town of San Isidro, Northern Samar.

=== Land transport system ===
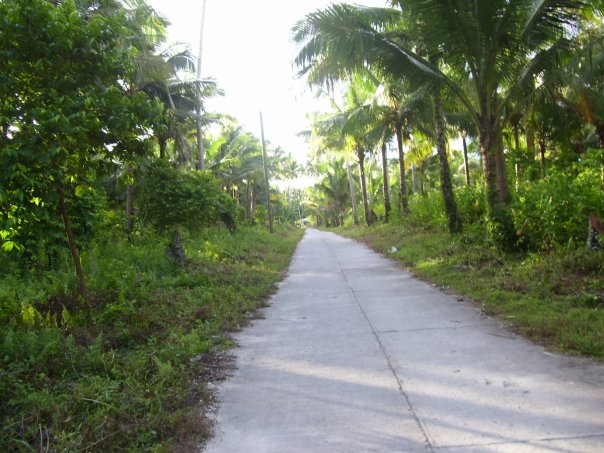
Circumferential Road

The main transportation going to the different part of the Island is the motorcycle where local called it as "honda" regardless of the manufacturer of the motorcycle. While going through the town proper there are several "padyak" as commonly called by the local residents; it is a bicycle driven cart.

== Education ==
=== Private schools ===
- Pearl Island Academy
- Spring View Adventist Academy

=== Public schools ===
Secondary school:

- San Antonio Agricultural and Vocational School

Elementary schools:

- San Antonio Central Elementary School
- Vinisitahan Elementary School
- Dalupirit Elementary School
- San Nicolas Elementary School
- Rizal Elementary School
- Manraya Elementary School
- Pilar Elementary School
- Burabod Elementary School

== Healthcare ==
- San Antonio District Hospital
- Municipal Health Center
- Barangay Health Center
