= First chief master sergeant =

The rank of first chief master sergeant in the Armed Forces of the Philippines was passed in a bill filed by Senator Rodolfo Biazon back in July 2004. It is expected that President Gloria Macapagal Arroyo will sign it very soon, enabling the rank to be created.

== Rank's Aim ==
- According to Bill Number 1286, the creation of the first chief master sergeant aims to professionalize the Armed Forces of the Philippines, especially in allowing its soldiers to choose a better career while serving in the army. The ranks are to be considered as non-commissioned officer ranks.

== Side arm insignia ==
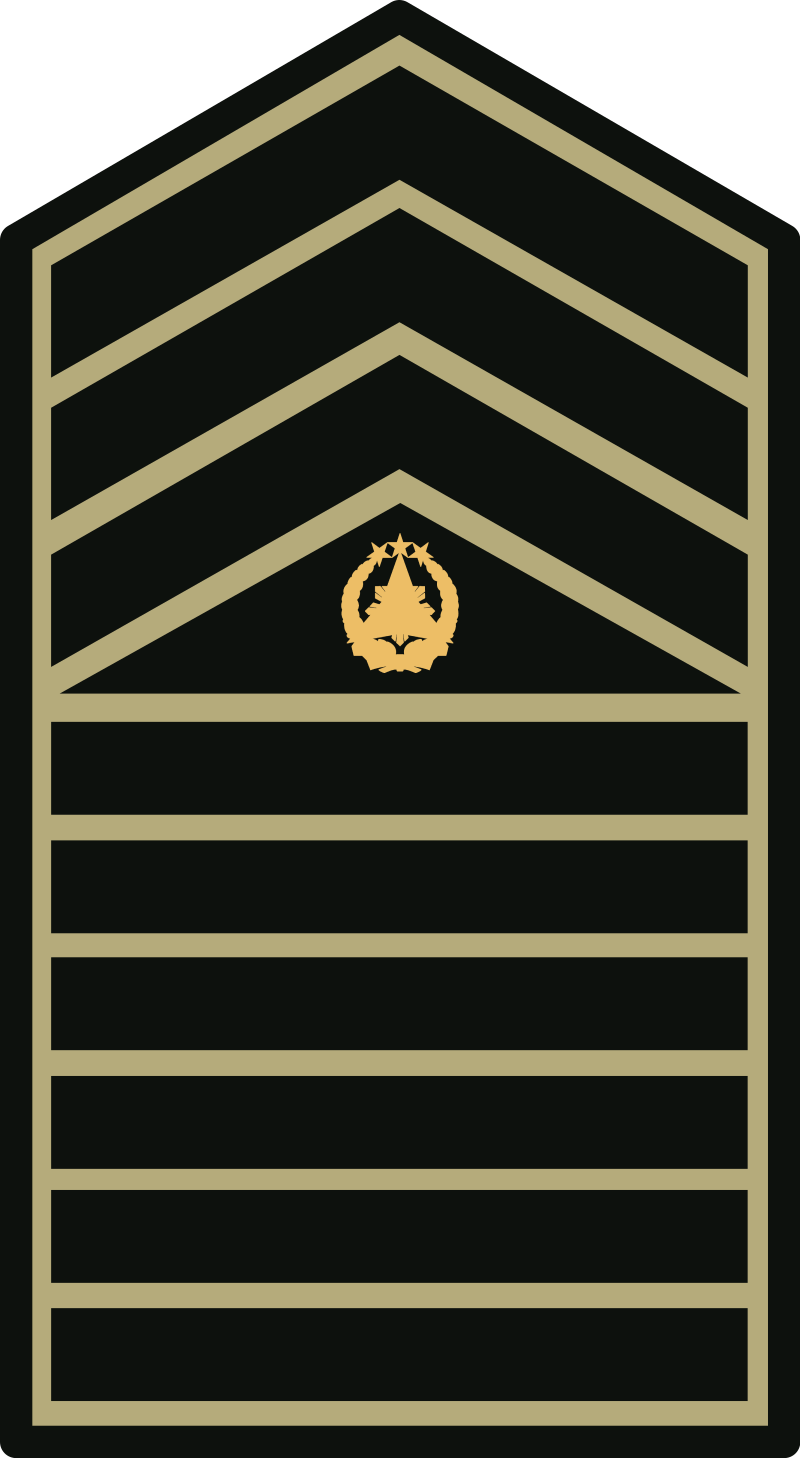
Philippine Army FCMS

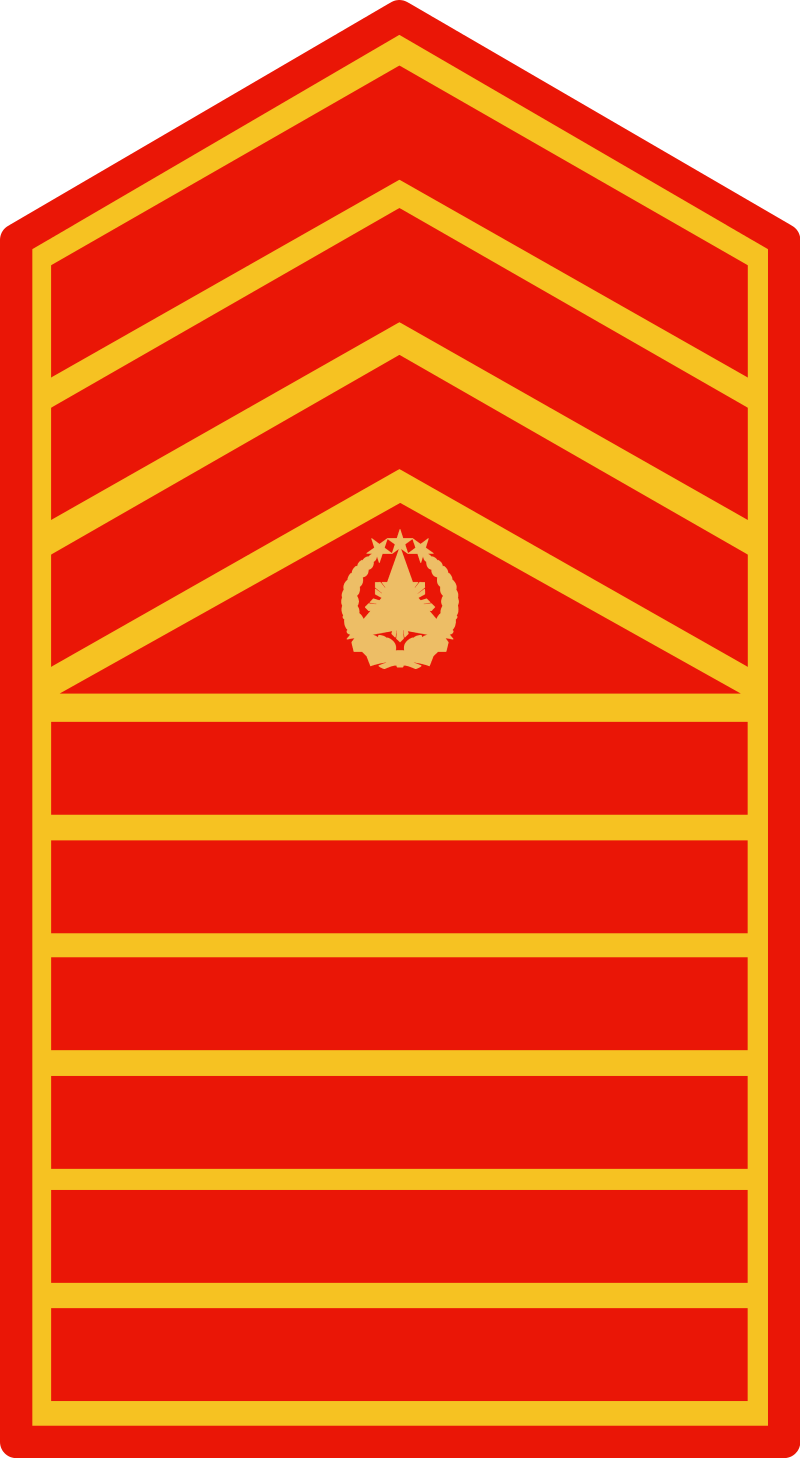
Philippine Marine Corps FCMS

== See also ==
- First master chief petty officer
