= First master chief petty officer =

The naval rank of First Master Chief Petty Officer in the Armed Forces of the Philippines has been passed in a bill filed by Senator Rodolfo Biazon back in July 2004. It is expected that President Gloria Macapagal Arroyo will sign it very soon, enabling the rank to be created. The equivalent rank in the Philippine Army will be first chief master sergeant.

== Rank's aim ==
- According to Senate Bill Number 1286, the creation of the rank of first master chief petty officer aims to professionalize the Armed Forces of the Philippines, especially in allowing its sailors to choose a better career while serving in the navy. The ranks are to be considered as non-commissioned officer ranks.

== Side arm insignia ==
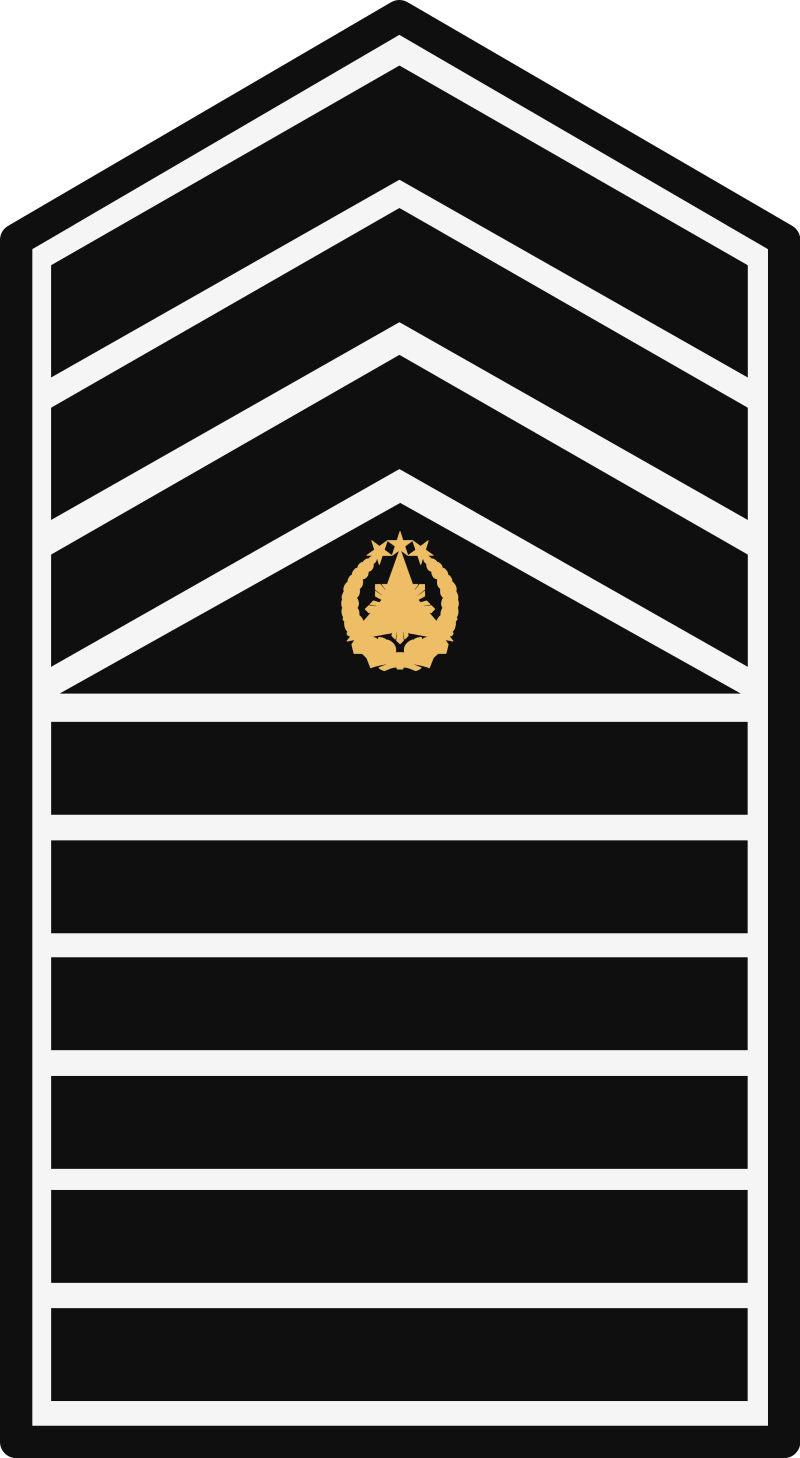
Philippine Navy FMCPO

== See also ==
- First chief master sergeant
