= 2022 Zamboanga del Sur local elections =

Part of the 2022 Philippine general election

2022 Zamboanga del Sur gubernatorial election
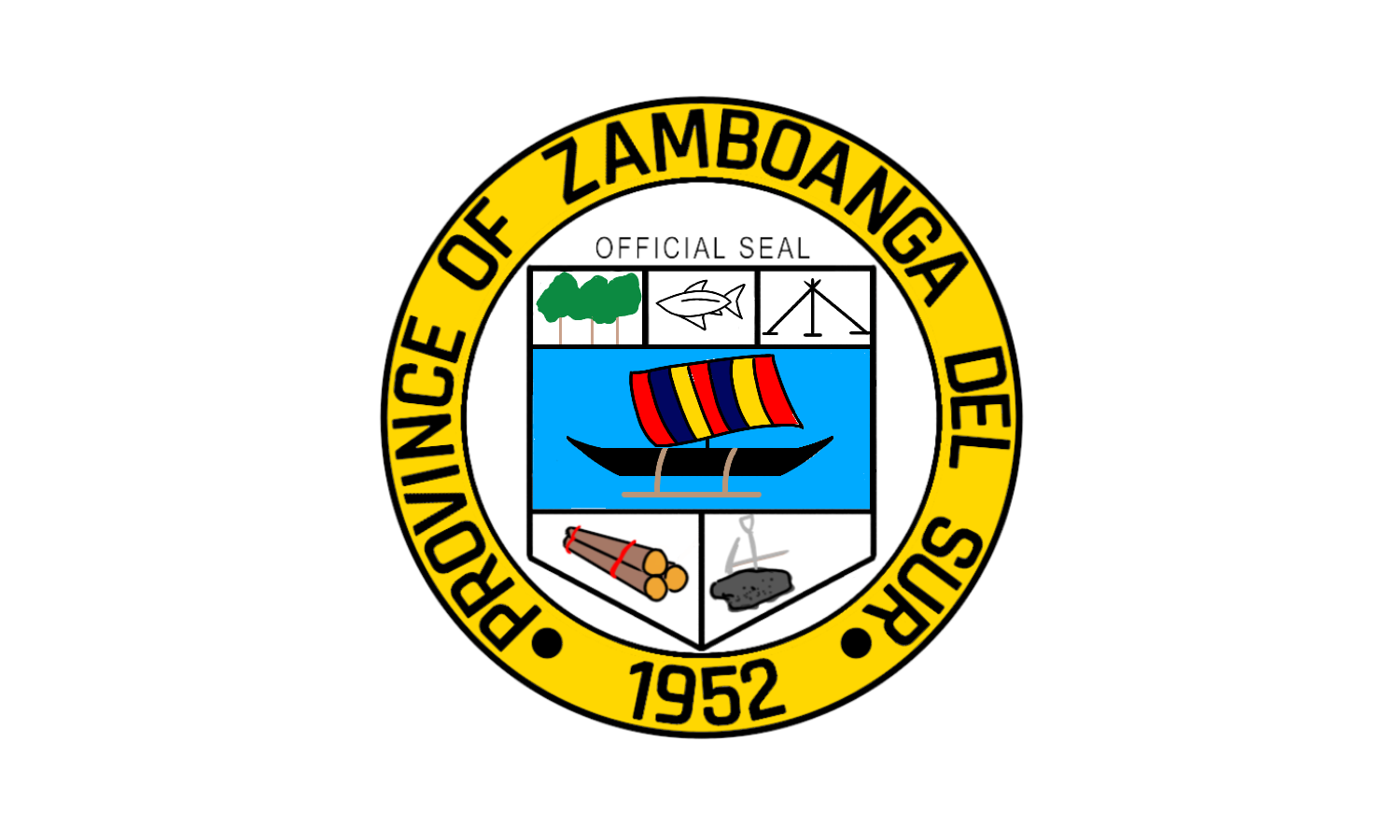
- May 9, 2022
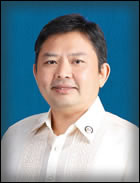
Nominee	Victor Yu	Jun Pacalioga
Party	PDP–Laban	PRP
Running mate	Roseller Ariosa	Ilang-Ilang Co
Popular vote	290,772	154,246
Percentage	55.42	29.40
Governor before election
Victor Yu
PDP–Laban
Elected Governor
Victor Yu
PDP–Laban

Local elections were held in the province of Zamboanga del Sur of the Philippines, on May 9, 2022, as part of the 2022 general election. Voters will select candidates for all local positions: a municipal and city mayor, vice mayor and councilors, as well as members of the Sangguniang Panlalawigan, the governor, vice governor and representatives for the two districts of Zamboanga del Sur.

== Provincial elections ==
All incumbents are marked in Italic

=== Gubernatorial race ===
Incumbent Governor Victor Yu is running for re-election under PDP–Laban. He will face off former representative and former governor Aurora Cerilles whom he easily defeated during the 2019 local elections by almost 100,000 votes.

Zamboanga del Sur Gubernatorial election
Party	Candidate	Votes	%
PDP–Laban	Victor Yu	290,772	55.42
PRP	Nacianceno Pacalioga Jr.	154,246	29.40
Nacionalista	Aurora Cerilles	69,197	13.19
Aksyon	Shaira Yu Gustaham	9,266	1.77
Independent	Alex Delos Santos	1,144	0.22
Total votes		524,625	100.00

=== Vice gubernatorial race ===
2022 Zamboanga del Sur Vice Gubernatorial election
Party	Candidate	Votes	%
PDP–Laban	Roseller Ariosa	241,546	49.89
PRP	Priscilla Ann Co	170,108	35.13
Nacionalista	Ace William Cerilles	72,516	14.98
Total votes		484,170	100.00

=== Provincial board ===
Party	Votes	%	Seats
Partido Demokratiko Pilipino-Lakas ng Bayan	444,300	21.83	4
Lakas-CMD	264,328	12.99	–
United Nationalist Alliance	240,108	11.80	2
Partido Federal ng Pilipinas	210,289	10.33	–
Pederalismo ng Dugong Dakilang Samahan	205,547	10.10	2
Partido Pilipino sa Pagbabago	193,251	9.49	1
Nationalist People's Coalition	132,056	6.49	–
Nacionalista Party	116,283	5.71	–
People's Reform Party	102,208	5.02	–
Independent	127,165	6.25	1
Ex officio seats			3
Total	2,035,535	100.00	13

==== 1st District ====
2022 Provincial Board Election in 1st District in Zamboanga del Sur
Party	Candidate	Votes	%
PDP–Laban	Cesar "Julu" Dacal Jr.	158,615	17.18
UNA	Rogelio "Roger" Saniel	147,602	15.99
PDDS	Maphilindo "Mapi" Obaob	132,140	14.31
PDP–Laban	Francisvic Villamero	118,687	12.86
Independent	Bienvenido "Jun" Ebarle	111,419	12.07
PPP	Almando Sanoria	109,491	11.86
PFP	Eric Bersales	95,994	10.40
Lakas	Rose Bolotaolo	94,793	10.27
PFP	Arnulfo "Noli" Garcia	81,198	8.80
PFP	Jovencio "Jovy" Mendoza	33,097	3.59
Nacionalista	Adriano "Django" Durano	26,028	2.82
NPC	Mario Cerilles	22,444	2.43
NPC	Mylo Quinto	16,657	1.80
NPC	Ramon "Dondon" Rodrigo	15,349	1.66
Independent	Marilou Fuentes	13,263	1.44
NPC	Sultan Radsac Bago	13,247	1.44
Total votes		1,190,024	100.00

==== 2nd District ====
2022 Provincial Board Election in 2nd District in Zamboanga del Sur
Party	Candidate	Votes	%
UNA	Juan "John" Regala	92,506	10.02
PDP–Laban	Jenifer "Dang" Mariano	85,570	9.27
PPP	Ronaldo "Loloy" Poloyapoy	83,760	9.07
PDP–Laban	Bebie Vidad	81,428	8.82
PDDS	Nanding Dela Cruz	73,407	7.95
Lakas	Kurt Cajeta	61,539	6.67
Lakas	Felicito "Ricky" Chavez	59,096	6.40
PRP	Edward "Dodong" Pintac	55,643	6.03
Lakas	Pastor Anlap	48,900	5.30
PRP	Onan Dacula	46,565	5.04
NPC	Miguelito Ocapan	36,172	3.92
Nacionalista	Danilo Dalid	32,622	3.53
Nacionalista	Canuto "Jun" Enerio	28,929	3.13
Nacionalista	Juneth Lanzaderas	28,704	3.11
NPC	Edgar Montero	28,187	3.05
Independent	Elmer Rocha	2,483	0.27
Total votes		845,511	100.00

== Congressional elections ==
=== 1st District ===
2022 Zamboanga del Sur Philippine House of Representatives election in the 1st District of Zamboanga del Sur
Party	Candidate	Votes	%
PDP–Laban	Divina Grace Yu	166,002	52.86
PRP	Edmario Revelo	131,275	41.80
NPC	Archie Yongco	15,544	4.95
Reform PH-People's Party	Delfin "Dell Ceniza" Supapo	1,220	0.39
Total votes		314,041	100.00

=== 2nd District ===
2022 Zamboanga del Sur Philippine House of Representatives election in the 2nd District of Zamboanga del Sur
Party	Candidate	Votes	%
PDP–Laban	Jeyzel Victoria Yu	104,055	49.04
Lakas	Leonardo "Jun" Babasa	61,703	28.78
NPC	Antonio Cerilles	47,065	22.18
Total votes		212,193	100.00

== City and municipal elections ==
=== 1st district ===
==== Pagadian City ====
Incumbent mayor Sammy Co is running for re-election; vice mayor Maphilindo Obaob is eligible for re-election, but opted to run for 1st district board member.

Pagadian City Mayoralty Election
Party	Candidate	Votes	%
PDDS	Jackielyn Krystyl "Jackie" Bana		
PDP–Laban	Samuel "Sammy" Co		
NPC	Ernesto "Erning" Mondarte		
Total votes			

Pagadian City Vice Mayoralty Election
Party	Candidate	Votes	%
NUP	Baldomero "Boy Baleleng" Fernandez		
NPC	Marive Jongco		
PDDS	Romeo "Tata" Pulmones		
Total votes			

==== Aurora ====
Aurora Mayoralty Election
Party	Candidate	Votes	%
PFP	Gallant Enrique "Gal" Cabahug		
Lakas	Karl Mendoza		
PDP–Laban	Silvano Zanoria		
Total votes			

Aurora Vice Mayoralty Election
Party	Candidate	Votes	%
Lakas	Sunny Dolorican		
PDDS	Emmanuel "Jojo" Palma II		
Nacionalista	Therisse Suzette "Pangs" Yongco		
Total votes			

==== Dumingag ====
Dumingag Mayoralty Election
Party	Candidate	Votes	%
PRP	Joan Pacalioga-Abejuela		
PDP–Laban	Gerry Paglinawan		
PFP	Edgar Trazona		
Aksyon	Kenneth Tom "Ken" Uy		
Total votes			

Dumingag Vice Mayoralty Election
Party	Candidate	Votes	%
Aksyon	Edwin Fanilag		
PFP	Lorrie Gallogo		
PDDS	Edgardo Jamero		
Lakas	Mydell Pacalioga		
Total votes			

==== Josefina ====
Josefina Mayoralty Election
Party	Candidate	Votes	%
Nacionalista	Melba Abear		
PDP–Laban	Catalino Adapon		
PRP	Edgar Maisog		
Total votes			

Josefina Vice Mayoralty Election
Party	Candidate	Votes	%
PDDS	Alberto "Dodong" Etulle		
NPC	Corsiana Monsanto		
Lakas	Maria Fe Pitogo		
Total votes			

==== Labangan ====
Labangan Mayoralty Election
Party	Candidate	Votes	%
Nacionalista	Bahnarin Ambag		
PRP	Oscar Buenaobra		
PDP–Laban	Eduardo "Eddie" Relacion		
Total votes			

Labangan Vice Mayoralty Election
Party	Candidate	Votes	%
Independent	Ferdinand Cabañas		
NPC	Lino Corpuz		
Lakas	Azralf Manupac		
PDDS	Susan Relacion		
Total votes			

==== Mahayag ====
Mahayag Mayoralty Election
Party	Candidate	Votes	%
PFP	Raquel "Sayson" Frasco		
PRP	Paulino Fanilag Sr.		
PDP–Laban	Manuel Saladaga		
Total votes			

Mahayag Vice Mayoralty Election
Party	Candidate	Votes	%
Independent	Virginia "Virgie" Baul		
Independent	Caritino Andrew "Anoy" Espina II		
PDDS	Lester Ace Espina		
Total votes			

==== Midsalip ====
Incumbent vice mayor Stewart Padayhag opted to run for mayor.

Midsalip Mayoralty Election
Party	Candidate	Votes	%
Nacionalista	Bienvenido Lumaad		
Lakas	Stewart Padayhag		
PDP–Laban	Elmer Soronio		
Total votes			

Midsalip Vice Mayoralty Election
Party	Candidate	Votes	%
PRP	Leonida Angcap		
NPC	Porferio "Dr. Periong" Sarabia		
PDP–Laban	Joann Tumapon		
Total votes			

==== Molave ====
Molave Mayoralty Election
Party	Candidate	Votes	%
Aksyon	Rico Amigo		
PDP–Laban	Cyril Reo "Dok-Cy" Glepa		
PRP	Flavio Saniel Jr.		
Total votes			

Molave Vice Mayoralty Election
Party	Candidate	Votes	%
Aksyon	Sharon Amigo		
PDDS	Monalisa "Mona" Glepa		
Lakas	Alberto "Yuki" Lacuaren Jr.		
Total votes			

==== Ramon Magsaysay ====
Mayor Nilo Borinaga and vice mayor Margie Arcite-Machon, both incumbents elected after the 2019 local elections, are switching positions in this election.

Ramon Magsaysay Mayoralty Election
Party	Candidate	Votes	%
PDP–Laban	Margie Arcite-Machon		
Lakas	Romulo Briones		
NPC	Alfonso "Jun" Donaire Jr.		
Total votes			

Ramon Magsaysay Vice Mayoralty Election
Party	Candidate	Votes	%
PDP–Laban	Leonilo "Nilo" Borinaga Jr.		
Nacionalista	James Borja		
Lakas	Jose Tabania Sr.		
Total votes			

==== Sominot ====
Sominot Mayoralty Election
Party	Candidate	Votes	%
Lakas	Stephen Acosta		
PDP–Laban	Johnriel "Jan Jan" Melo		
Total votes			

Sominot Vice Mayoralty Election
Party	Candidate	Votes	%
PRP	Amor Buhion		
PDDS	Proceso Estrada		
Total votes			

==== Tambulig ====
Tambulig Mayoralty Election
Party	Candidate	Votes	%
PFP	Romel Angus		
NPC	Rey Millante		
PDP–Laban	Charlotte "Lotte" Panal		
Total votes			

Tambulig Vice Mayoralty Election
Party	Candidate	Votes	%
PDDS	Jonathan "Jojo" Butad		
Nacionalista	Marivic Dolino		
PFP	Sherwin Tumala		
Total votes			

==== Tukuran ====
Incumbent vice mayor Delfina Cortina is running for mayor.

Tukuran Mayoralty Election
Party	Candidate	Votes	%
PRP	Delfina Cortina		
Independent	Christorey "Rey" Ramones		
Nacionalista	Leomy Saysip		
PDP–Laban	Macario "Dodong Ores" Tingson		
Total votes			

Tukuran Vice Mayoralty Election
Party	Candidate	Votes	%
PDP–Laban	Joean Marie "An-An" Tiongson		
Lakas	Jocyl Faith "Lab-lab" Vega		
Nacionalista	Maychel Velayo-Rota		
Total votes			

=== 2nd district ===
==== Bayog ====
Bayog Mayoralty Election
Party	Candidate	Votes	%
Nacionalista	Mary Ann Cartalla		
PPP	Lucenio Manda		
Lakas	Celso "Dodong" Matias		
PDP–Laban	Rodely "Lang Lang" Paquit		
Total votes			

Bayog Vice Mayoralty Election
Party	Candidate	Votes	%
PRP	Jocel "Cha Cha" Babasa		
PPP	Elfred "Tabong" Esteban		
Nacionalista	Jonathan Funa		
PDP–Laban	Julieto Monding		
Total votes			

==== Dimataling ====
Dimataling Mayoralty Election
Party	Candidate	Votes	%
NPC	Haniel "Niel" Baya		
Lakas	Lope Congcardas Jr.		
PFP	Jose "Abel" Yamba Jr.		
PDP–Laban	Avelino "Abel" Yrauda		
Total votes			

Dimataling Vice Mayoralty Election
Party	Candidate	Votes	%
PDDS	Omar Buluan		
PRP	Rolly Duran		
Nacionalista	Moises Roque Jr.		
Total votes			

==== Dinas ====
Dinas Mayoralty Election
Party	Candidate	Votes	%
PRP	Frederick "Dong-Dong" Albios		
PFP	Romeo "Kling 2x" Alima Jr.		
PDP–Laban	Eleazer Asoy		
Aksyon	Felix "Jun-Jun" Asoy Jr.		
Total votes			

Dinas Vice Mayoralty Election
Party	Candidate	Votes	%
Independent	Melvin Alicos		
PDP–Laban	Arlyn Coronado		
Lakas	Matt Nian		
PFP	Luis "Bong" Tolentino Jr.		
Total votes			

==== Dumalinao ====
Dumalinao Mayoralty Election
Party	Candidate	Votes	%
Nacionalista	Junaflor "Sweet" Cerilles		
PDP–Laban	Raul Famor		
PFP	Alex Fernandez		
Total votes			

Dumalinao Vice Mayoralty Election
Party	Candidate	Votes	%
PDDS	Lorenzo "Lor" Alcantara		
PFP	Idyl Lauglaug		
Nacionalista	Wilfredo "Willy" Malong Sr.		
Total votes			

==== Guipos ====
Guipos Mayoralty Election
Party	Candidate	Votes	%
Lakas	Vicente "Dodo" Cajeta		
PDP–Laban	Francisco "Jun" Oraiz Jr.		
PFP	Bernaldo "Bernie" Perez		
Total votes			

Guipos Vice Mayoralty Election
Party	Candidate	Votes	%
NPC	Mario Chavez		
PDP–Laban	Junevell "Kabing" Oraiz-Lamiing		
PRP	Merlyn Rabe		
Total votes			

==== Kumalarang ====
Kumalarang Mayoralty Election
Party	Candidate	Votes	%
Aksyon	Ranny Dorimon		
PDP–Laban	Raniel Graciano "Raniel" Dormitorio		
Lakas	Ruel "Balong" Molina		
Nacionalista	Eugenio "Loloy" Salva Jr.		
Total votes			

Kumalarang Vice Mayoralty Election
Party	Candidate	Votes	%
PDDS	Manuel Biaco		
PRP	Pinky Molina		
NPC	Eleuterio "Jun" Rafayla Jr.		
Total votes			

==== Lakewood ====
Lakewood Mayoralty Election
Party	Candidate	Votes	%
PDP–Laban	Domingo "Doming" Mirrar		
Lakas	Roger "Ondo" Polinar		
Aksyon	Mary Joan Sarmiento		
Total votes			

Lakewood Vice Mayoralty Election
Party	Candidate	Votes	%
PRP	Alex Cuajotor		
PDP–Laban	Ronaldo Looc		
Aksyon	Arnel Pano		
Total votes			

==== Lapuyan ====
Lapuyan Mayoralty Election
Party	Candidate	Votes	%
WPP	Myrone Banghulot		
Aksyon	Samuel "Sammy" Cubico		
PFP	Joenery "Jun" Ojas		
Nacionalista	Leonard "Nard" Sindod		
PDP–Laban	Joel Sulong		
Total votes			

Lapuyan Vice Mayoralty Election
Party	Candidate	Votes	%
PDP–Laban	Morvin Fernandez		
WPP	Tomboc Sabang Jr.		
NPC	Liezel Sia		
Total votes			

==== Margosatubig ====
Mayor George Minor and vice mayor Totoy Agua, all incumbents in their positions, are running for reelection.

Margosatubig Mayoralty Election
Party	Candidate	Votes	%
NPC	Edilberto "Eddie" Adlaon		
Lakas	Roy Encallado		
PDP–Laban	George "Doctor" Minor		
Total votes			

Margosatubig Vice Mayoralty Election
Party	Candidate	Votes	%
PDDS	Alejandro "Totoy" Agua III		
PRP	Rey "Rey-Rey" Burburan		
Nacionalista	Jerome Reales		
Total votes			

==== Pitogo ====
Incumbent mayor James Yecyec is running for reelection, while vice mayor Zosimo Garban is running for mayor.

Pitogo Mayoralty Election
Party	Candidate	Votes	%
NPC	Zosimo Garban		
KBL	Paquito "Tikboy" Omisol		
Lakas	Antonio "Tony" Patayon		
PDP–Laban	James Yecyec		
Total votes			

Pitogo Vice Mayoralty Election
Party	Candidate	Votes	%
Nacionalista	Rezza Mendez		
PRP	Erna Patayon		
PDDS	James Yecyec Jr.		
Total votes			

==== San Miguel ====
Incumbent mayor Dodong Martinez is running for vice mayor.

San Miguel Mayoralty Election
Party	Candidate	Votes	%
PFP	Marilou "Lolong" Felicia		
PRP	Vida Belle Althea "Vdang" Martinez		
PDP–Laban	Ex Ocapan		
Total votes			

San Miguel Vice Mayoralty Election
Party	Candidate	Votes	%
PDP–Laban	Bengie Beniga		
Lakas	Angelito "Dodong" Martinez II		
PFP	Jeanez "Jiji" Tumatal		
Total votes			

==== San Pablo ====
San Pablo Mayoralty Election
Party	Candidate	Votes	%
PFP	Rey Binag		
PDP–Laban	Belman Mantos		
Lakas	Danilo "Danny" Taucan		
Total votes			

San Pablo Vice Mayoralty Election
Party	Candidate	Votes	%
PRP	Roberto Aguilar		
PDP–Laban	Flavio "Banjo" Cordero Jr.		
PFP	Prencelio "Prince" Pamplona		
Total votes			

==== Tabina ====
Incumbent vice mayor Greg Dayondon and Sangguniang Bayan member Anthony Dayondon are running for mayor. Despite Greg Dayondon's affiliation with Aksyon Demokratiko and that of Jessel Campomanes with People's Reform Party, they are running as independents based on COMELEC records.

Tabina Mayoralty Election
Party	Candidate	Votes	%
PDP–Laban	Anthony Dayondon		
Aksyon	Greg Dayondon		
Lakas	Juhaine "Bader" Malaco		
Total votes			

Tabina Vice Mayoralty Election
Party	Candidate	Votes	%
PRP	Jessel Campomanes		
Aksyon	Rally Eslit		
PDDS	Clydelyn Poloyapoy-Pablo		
Total votes			

==== Tigbao ====
Incumbent mayor Dodong Carcallas is running for reelection, while vice mayor Joy Balandra is running for Sangguniang Bayan member.

Tigbao Mayoralty Election
Party	Candidate	Votes	%
Nacionalista	Ricardo Alajeño		
PDP–Laban	Eleazar "Dodong" Carcallas		
Lakas	Tadios "Thads" Dapogracion		
Total votes			

Tigbao Vice Mayoralty Election
Party	Candidate	Votes	%
PDP–Laban	Rowell "Onggok" Lalican		
Nacionalista	Leonardo Sajulga		
PRP	Mercy Sayson		
Total votes			

==== Vincenzo A. Sagun ====
Vincenzo A. Sagun Mayoralty Election
Party	Candidate	Votes	%
PDP–Laban	Adriano "Arding" Balugtod		
Aksyon	Meriline Locson		
Lakas	Jeffry Mata		
PROMDI	Cerelito "Lito" Sabellano		
Total votes			

Vincenzo A. Sagun Vice Mayoralty Election
Party	Candidate	Votes	%
PDP–Laban	Ruflearson "Ruff" Alfaro		
PRP	Noel Reales		
Aksyon	Joyleen Sorabia		
PROMDI	Noel Umbac		
Total votes			
