= Zamboanga del Sur State University =

Public college in Zamboanga del Sur, Philippines

- Pamantasang Pang-estado ng Zamboanga del Sur (Filipino)
- Former names: Josefina H. Cerilles Memorial Barangay High School (1983‑1995); Josefina H. Cerilles Polytechnic College (1996‑2001); J.H. Cerilles State College (2001‑2025)
- Type: State university
- Established: 1996
- Academic affiliations: PASUC, MASCUF
- President: Edgardo H. Rosales
- Vice-president: Vilma C. Grengia (VP for Academic Affairs); Jerry B. Superales (VP for Research & Extension)
- Location: Mati, San Miguel, Zamboanga del Sur, Philippines; 7°42′30″N 123°17′33″E
- Campus: San Miguel (main); Pagadian Annex; Canuto MS Enerio (Lakewood); Dumingag
- Sporting affiliations: SCUAA
- Website: jhcsc.edu.ph
- Location in Mindanao Location in the Philippines

Zamboanga del Sur State University (ZDSSU), formerly known as Josefina H. Cerilles State College, is a state university in Zamboanga del Sur, Philippines. Its main campus is located in Mati, San Miguel, Zamboanga del Sur.

== History ==
=== Josefina H. Cerilles Memorial High School ===
The school was named Josefina H. Cerilles Memorial Barangay High School in honor of the assemblyman's wife who was once a supervisor of DECS. This was approved through a Sangguniang Bayan Resolution No. 23 in April 1983 and Sangguniang Panlalawigan Resolution No. 295-A in 1984 pursuant to DECS Order N0.6, series of 1983.

Crispin Mag-usara took the leadership of the newly created school and not long after, Fortunato Gumintad succeeded him as teacher-in-charge. With the cooperation of the school's faculty and staff, and the residents of the community, Gumintad made a lot of improvements of the school which was originally constructed out of light materials.

In 1987, when all barangay high schools in the country were fully nationalized, the school's name was changed to Josefina H. Cerilles National High School. In the succeeding year, it was one of the recipients of the Secondary Education Development Program (SEDP) building package and subsequently thereafter, the U.S. AID academic building package.

=== Josefina H. Cerilles Polytechnic College ===
On February 25, 1995, Josefina H. Cerilles National High School was converted into Josefina H. Cerilles Polytechnic College by virtue of the Republic Act No. 7895 authored by then Congressman Antonio H. Cerilles. With this development, the High School Department became the laboratory school of the Teacher Education Department of the college.

In 1996, Josefina H. Cerilles Polytechnic College started its full operation as a CHED-supervised institution with Mr. Francisco Caylan of the DECS as its officer-in-charge. The first eight faculty members of the college were Mrs. Filomena G. Montealto, Mrs. Winifreda L. Rico, Mrs. Daylinda P. Sulong, Mrs. Mila A. Samin, Miss Nelia B. Aragon, Engr. Jerry B. Superales, Mr. Lumabao B. Sanlao and Mr. Jesus B. Purisima.

In 1997, Mrs. Filomena G. Montealto was appointed as vocational school superintendent.

=== J.H. Cerilles State College ===
After six years of operation as a CHED-supervised institution, JHCPC was converted into J.H. Cerilles State College on August 11, 2001, by virtue of the Republic Act 9159 authored by Congresswoman Aurora Cerilles. Montealto was appointed as the first president of the State College.

=== Elevation as state university ===
On September 25, 2023, Zamboanga del Sur 2nd district Representative Victoria Yu filed House Bill No. 9315 that aims to convert the state college to a state university and renaming it as Zamboanga del Sur State University. The bill passed by the House on third reading on November 23, 2023 with no objections. The Senate approved the bill on third reading on June 3, 2025 with amendments and the House concurred with Senate amendments on June 9, 2025. The approved bill was transmitted to the President on August 15, 2025 but was lapsed on to a law on September 15, 2025 as Republic Act No. 12295. Republic Act No. 12295 took effect on October 4, 2025.

== Integration ==
In June 2006, two external units were opened in the municipalities of Josefina and San Pablo. A former WMSU-ESU in the municipality of Margosatubig was affiliated to JHCSC in June of this year. CMSECAT (Canuto MS Enerio College of Arts and Trade) in the municipality of Lakewood was integrated to the college in October of the same year.

On December 1, 2006, Dr. Carlicita A. Saniel was appointed by the JHCSC-BOT as president of the college to serve the remaining term of Montealto while Dante B. Bayocot assumed his former position as college registrar.

In March 2007, Saniel was installed by JHCSC-BOT as the second president of the college. During her term of office, new external units were opened to cater the educational needs of the poor but deserving students of Zamboanga del Sur. These external units are located in the municipalities of Vincenzo Sagun (opened in June 2007), Tabina (October 2007), Guipos (June 2009) and Sominot (June 2009). The integration of ZSAC (Zamboanga del Sur Agricultural College) to JHCSC in June 2009 led to the birth of JHCSC-Dumingag campus. This was followed by the offering of extension classes of JHCSC-Main in Dumalinao (June 2012) and the extension classes of JHCSC-Dumingag in Molave and Aurora.

On June 15, 2012, JHCSC-BOT confirmed Saniel as president of JHCSC for a second term. Today, the JHCSC System has 3 Organic Campuses and 18 external units located in the different municipalities of Zamboanga del Sur. Its main campus is preparing for its Level 1 accreditation with AACCUP.

To make education accessible to the poorest students in the province of Zamboanga del Sur, JHCSC External Units were opened in the municipalities of Tigbao, Lapuyan, Dimataling, Mahayag, Tambulig, and Ramon Magsaysay in June 2005. Three former Western Mindanao State University-External Studies Units (WMSU-ESU) were affiliated to JHCSC during this year. It was also the year that marked the opening of JHCSC-Pagadian Annex.
