= Sominot =

Municipality in Zamboanga del Sur, Philippines

- Municipality
- Municipality of Sominot
- Seal

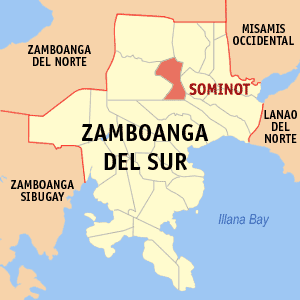
- Map of Zamboanga del Sur with Sominot highlighted
- Interactive map of Sominot
- Location within the Philippines
- Coordinates: 8°02′30″N 123°23′05″E
- Country: Philippines
- Region: Zamboanga Peninsula
- Province: Zamboanga del Sur
- District: 1st district
- Founded: March 27, 1980
- Barangays: 18 (see Barangays)

Government
  - Type: Sangguniang Bayan
  - Mayor: Johnriel D. Melo
  - Vice Mayor: Proceso S. Estrada
  - Representative: Divina Grace C. Yu
  - Municipal Council: Members: Gabriel N. Maglangit; Tomas S. Maglangit Jr.; Sancho P. Jagonia; Manolo E. Masong Sr.; Shella M. Sullano; Roel S. Hocoy; Randie B. Pitogo; Noemie James T. Damas II
  - Electorate: 10,862 voters (2025)

Area
  - Total: 111.52 km^{2} (43.06 sq mi)
- Elevation: 256 m (840 ft)
- Highest elevation: 490 m (1,610 ft)
- Lowest elevation: 22 m (72 ft)

Population (2024 census)
  - Total: 17,247
  - Density: 154.65/km^{2} (400.55/sq mi)
  - Households: 4,237

Economy
  - Income class: 4th municipal income class
  - Poverty incidence: 46.31% (2023)
  - Revenue: ₱ 128 million (2024)
  - Assets: ₱ 404.3 million (2024)
  - Expenditure: ₱ 35.67 million (2024)
  - Liabilities: ₱ 121.9 million (2024)

Service provider
  - Electricity: Zamboanga del Sur 1 Electric Cooperative (ZAMSURECO 1)
- Time zone: UTC+8 (PST)
- ZIP code: 7022
- PSGC: 0907340000
- IDD : area code: +63 (0)62
- Native languages: Subanon; Cebuano; Chavacano; Tagalog
- Website: www.zds-sominot.gov.ph

Sominot, officially the Municipality of Sominot (Cebuano: Lungsod sa Sominot; Subanen: Benwa Sominot; Chavacano: Municipalidad de Sominot; Tagalog: Bayan ng Sominot), is a municipality in the province of Zamboanga del Sur, Philippines. According to the 2024 census, it has a population of 17,247 people.

The town was created in 1980 as Don Mariano Marcos, after then-President Ferdinand Marcos' father Mariano Marcos, and was composed of barangays previously part of the municipalities of Dumingag, Mahayag, Midsalip, Ramon Magsaysay, and Tukuran. It was renamed to its present name in 1988.

== Geography ==
=== Barangays ===
Sominot is politically subdivided into 18 barangays. Each barangay consists of puroks while some have sitios.

- Bag-ong Baroy
- New Oroquieta
- Barubuhan
- Bulanay
- Datagan
- Eastern Poblacion
- Lantawan
- Libertad
- Lumangoy
- New Carmen
- Picturan
- Poblacion
- Rizal
- San Miguel
- Santo Niño
- Sawa
- Tungawan
- Upper Sicpao

=== Climate ===
Climate data for Sominot, Zamboanga del Sur
Month	Jan	Feb	Mar	Apr	May	Jun	Jul	Aug	Sep	Oct	Nov	Dec	Year
Mean daily maximum °C (°F)	28 (82)	28 (82)	29 (84)	30 (86)	28 (82)	28 (82)	27 (81)	27 (81)	28 (82)	27 (81)	28 (82)	28 (82)	28 (82)
Mean daily minimum °C (°F)	21 (70)	21 (70)	21 (70)	22 (72)	22 (72)	22 (72)	22 (72)	22 (72)	22 (72)	22 (72)	22 (72)	21 (70)	22 (71)
Average precipitation mm (inches)	48 (1.9)	44 (1.7)	56 (2.2)	56 (2.2)	112 (4.4)	135 (5.3)	124 (4.9)	124 (4.9)	115 (4.5)	134 (5.3)	90 (3.5)	56 (2.2)	1,094 (43)
Average rainy days	13.0	11.7	15.6	18.1	25.6	25.7	25.2	24.1	23.8	26.1	22.3	16.5	247.7
Source: Meteoblue

== Demographics ==
Population census of Sominot
Year	Pop.	±% p.a.
1990	12,653	—
1995	13,344	+1.00%
2000	14,815	+2.27%
2007	16,367	+1.38%
2010	16,652	+0.63%
2015	18,537	+2.06%
2020	19,061	+0.59%
2024	17,247	−2.37%
Source: Philippine Statistics Authority

== Economy ==
Poverty incidence of Sominot (%)

Source: Philippine Statistics Authority
