= Western Mindanao State University =

Public university in Zamboanga City, Philippines

- Pamantasang Pampamahalaan ng Kanlurang Mindanao (Filipino)
- Type: Public Regional higher education institution
- Established: 1904; 122 years ago
- President: Dr. Ma. Carla A. Ochotorena
- Vice-president: Dr. Nursia M. Barjose (VP for Academic Affairs); Dr. Joselito D. Madroñal (VP for Administration & Finance); Dr. Joel G. Fernando (VP for Research, Extension Services & External Linkages); Dr. Fredelino M. San Juan (OIC) (VP for Resource Generation)
- Faculty: 1,000
- Undergraduates: 28,000
- Postgraduates: 2,000
- Location: Normal Road, Baliwasan, Zamboanga City, Philippines; 6°54′47″N 122°03′43″E
- Campus: Main: Baliwasan, Zamboanga City 7.9 hectares (79,000 m^{2}) Satellite: San Ramon, Zamboanga City 20 hectares (200,000 m^{2}); Curuan, Zamboanga City; Malangas, Zamboanga Sibugay
- Mascot: Fighting Crimsons
- Website: wmsu.edu.ph
- Location in Mindanao Location in the Philippines

Western Mindanao State University (WMSU; Filipino: Pamantasang Pampamahalaan ng Kanlurang Mindanao; Chavacano: Universidad del Estado de Mindanao Occidental) is a state university located in Zamboanga City, Philippines. It has two campuses: the main campus of 79,000 square metres and 9,147 square metres in the city proper, and the satellite campus of 200,000 square metres in San Ramon about 20 kilometers from the city. Campuses comprising the external studies units are in the provinces of Zamboanga del Sur and Zamboanga Sibugay. It has a student population of over 32,000, regular faculty members of over 600 and over 200 administrative personnel.

It has 15 colleges, one institute and two autonomous campuses offering undergraduate and postgraduate courses specializing in accounting, education, engineering, nursing, arts and humanities, social work, science and mathematics. Along with these major fields of concentration, WMSU also offers courses in agriculture, architecture, forestry, home economics, nutrition and dietetics, computer science, criminology, Asian and Islamic Studies and special degree courses for foreign students. It also offers external studies and non-formal education courses.

WMSU ranked sixth among 68 universities all over the country, according to a survey on the Top Academic Institutions in the Philippines conducted by the Commission on Higher Education. The university's College of Teacher Education is a Center for Development; the College of Architecture is a Center of Development; and the College of Social Work and Community Development was awarded the Best School for Social Work in the Philippines.

== History ==
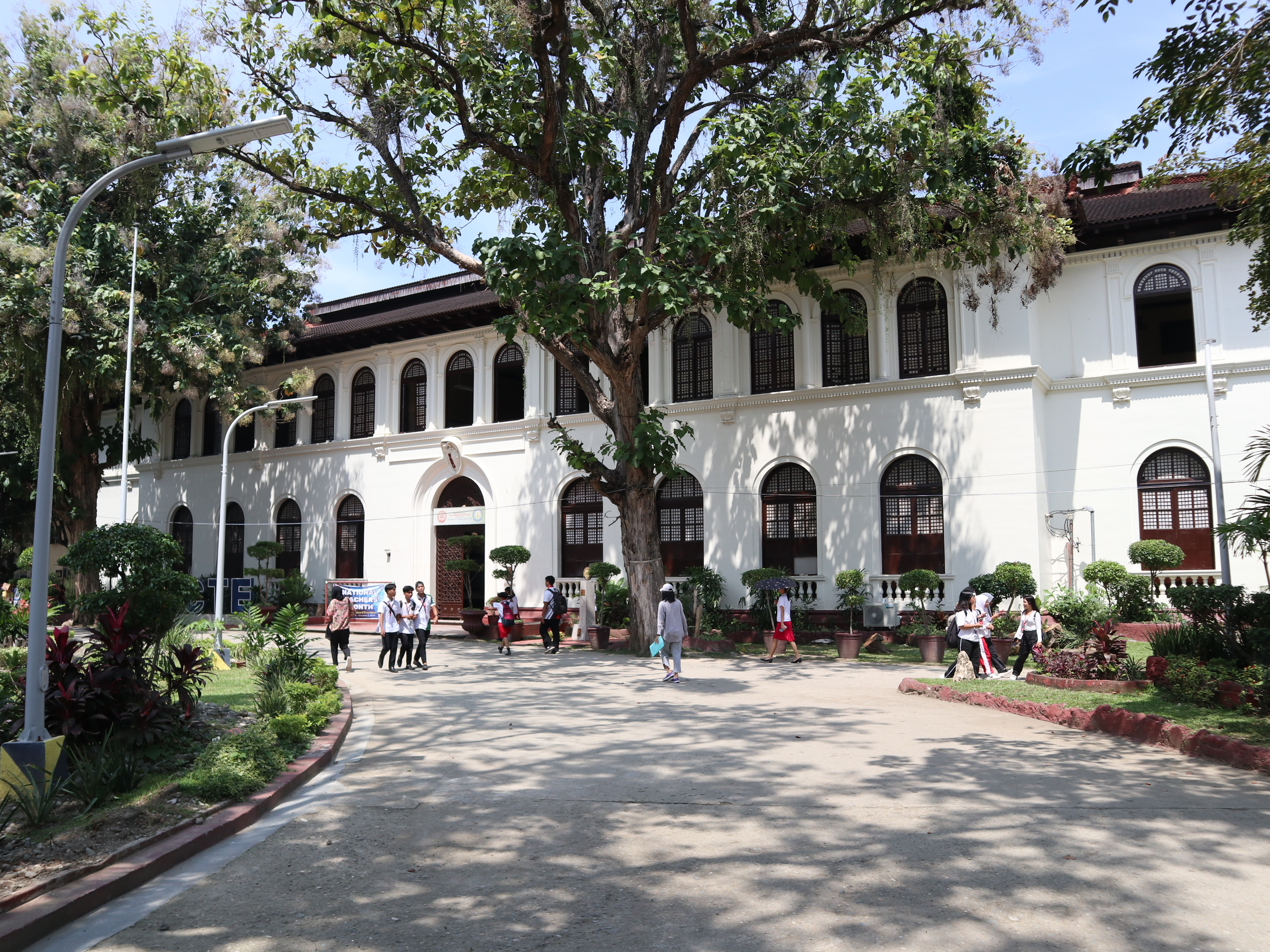
Gabaldon building of the Zamboanga Normal School, the predecessor of Western Mindanao State University

With the cessation of the hostilities that marked the end of the Spanish–American War in 1898, Filipino and American educators agreed that the best way to rebuild a devastated nation was through the establishment of a sound education system. Eight normal schools were then established in the Philippines by the Americans. One of them was the Zamboanga Normal School established in 1904. As a secondary school, the Zamboanga Normal School offered a general academic curriculum under the Department of Mindanao and Sulu primarily designed to cater to the needs of cultural minorities in the provinces of Cotabato, Davao, Lanao, Sulu, and Zamboanga.

In June 1921, the secondary normal curriculum of the Zamboanga Normal School had to be phased out for lack of enrollees. It was re-opened the following year and produced its first batch of graduates in 1926. Until the end of school year 1939–1940, the general secondary academic and normal curricula continued to be simultaneously offered. As a result of the opening of the Zamboanga City High School in 1939, the general secondary academic curriculum was discontinued but was offered at the college level. It was briefly disrupted with the outbreak of the Second World War.

After the war, the school resumed operations enabling those who started first year in the two-year collegiate normal curriculum before the war to continue as sophomore students. In April 1946 they were awarded the Elementary Teacher's Certificate (E.T.C.). The secondary normal curriculum was offered only during the summer term until 1952.

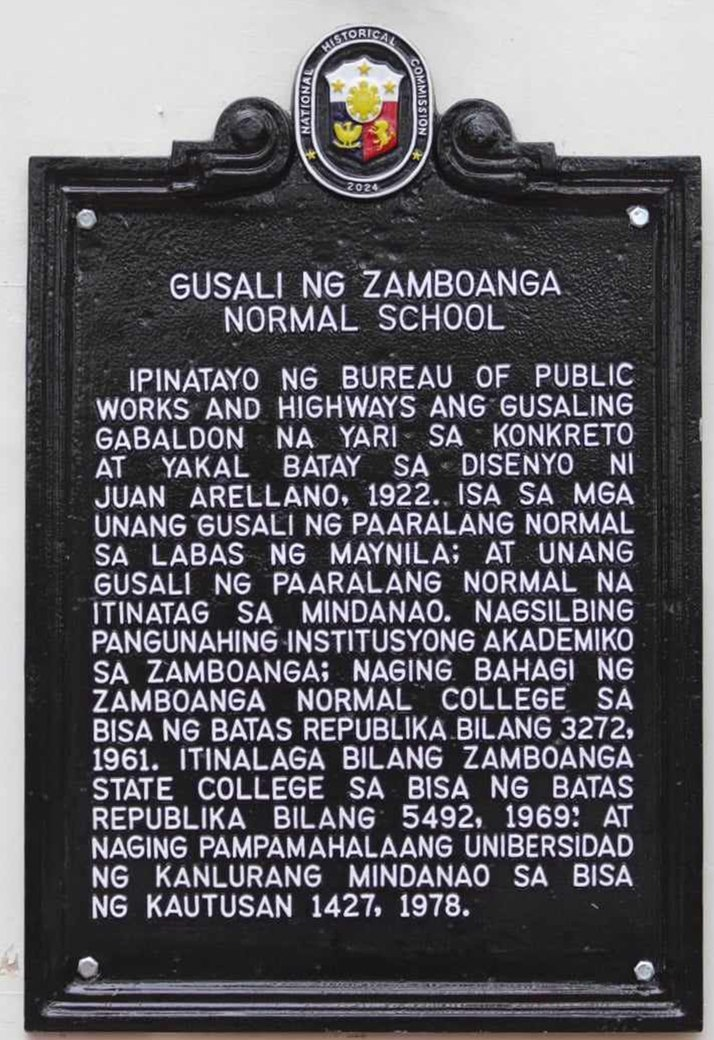
Historical marker installed in 1921 to commemorate the original building of the Zamboanga Normal School

Upon its conversion to the Zamboanga Normal College on June 17, 1961, by virtue of Republic Act No. 3272, the Zamboanga Normal College was placed under the direct supervision of the Bureau of Public Schools (BPS) until its autonomy in 1963. Gradually, it started to offer new degree programs.

The Zamboanga del Norte Agricultural College was the former name of the Tampilisan campus of Western Mindanao State University. The passage of Republic Act No. 3889 on June 18, 1964, caused the conversion of the Zamboanga del Norte National Agricultural School in Liloy, Zamboanga del Norte, to become a college known as Zamboanga del Norte Agricultural College.

The amendment of Republic Act No. 3272 on June 26, 1969 by Republic Act No. 5492 resulted in the conversion of the Zamboanga Normal School into the Zamboanga State College. Considering the demands of a growing population in a rapidly changing society and upon the initiative of Western Mindanao Regional Commissioner Rear Admiral Romulo Espaldon, President Ferdinand E. Marcos signed Presidential Decree No. 1427 on June 10, 1978, elevating the Zamboanga State College into the Western Mindanao State University.

Since its conversion into a state university, the following university presidents have taken its leadership: Dr. Juanito A. Bruno, as Acting President (1978–1986); Dr. Bernabela L. Ko, as first full-fledged president (1986–1991); Dr. Erdulfo B. Fernando (1991–1997); Dr. Eldigario D. Gonzales, DPA, CSEE (1997–2007); Dr. Grace Rebollos, the university's first summa cum laude graduate (2007–2012); Dr. Milabel Enriquez-Ho (2012–2020); Dr. Ma. Carla Ochotorena (2020–Present). Today, WMSU has a total of 1,000 teaching and administrative support staff catering to over 20,000 students.

The university's College of Teacher Education and College of Forestry have been designated as a Centers of Development by the Commission on Higher Education.

== Campuses ==
=== Main campuses ===
- Main Campus, Normal Road, Baliwasan, Zamboanga City
- Campus B, San Jose Road, Baliwasan, Zamboanga City

=== Satellite campuses ===
- San Ramon Campus, San Ramon, Zamboanga City
- Malangas Campus, Malangas, Zamboanga Sibugay
- Curuan Campus, Curuan, Zamboanga City

=== Former campuses ===
- Tampilisan Campus, Tampilisan, Zamboanga del Norte

now Jose Rizal Memorial State University

- Dumingag Campus, Dumingag, Zamboanga del Sur

now Josefina H. Cerilles State College

=== External Studies Unit (ESU) ===
- Alicia, Zamboanga Sibugay
- Aurora, Zamboanga del Sur
- Diplahan, Zamboanga Sibugay
- Imelda, Zamboanga Sibugay
- Ipil, Zamboanga Sibugay
- Mabuhay, Zamboanga Sibugay
- Molave, Zamboanga del Sur
- Naga, Zamboanga Sibugay
- Olutanga, Zamboanga Sibugay
- Pagadian City, Zamboanga del Sur
- Siay, Zamboanga Sibugay
- Tungawan, Zamboanga Sibugay

=== Autonomous campuses ===
- Curuan Campus, Zamboanga City
- Malangas Campus, Zamboanga Sibugay

== Notable faculty and alumni ==
- Evangelina Macaraeg Macapagal, the former First Lady of the Republic of the Philippines and mother of the former President Gloria Macapagal Arroyo. Macapagal is an alumna of the College of Teacher Education of the University.
- Rear Admiral Romulo Espaldon, first Regional Commissioner of Region IX and first Minister of Muslim Affairs. Espaldon was awarded a Doctorate of Humanities honoris causa for his role in elevating Zamboanga State College into Western Mindanao State University.

== See also ==
- Zamboanga del Sur Agricultural College
- Zamboanga del Norte Agricultural College
