= Molave, Zamboanga del Sur =

Municipality in Zamboanga del Sur, Philippines

Molave
- Municipality
- Municipality of Molave
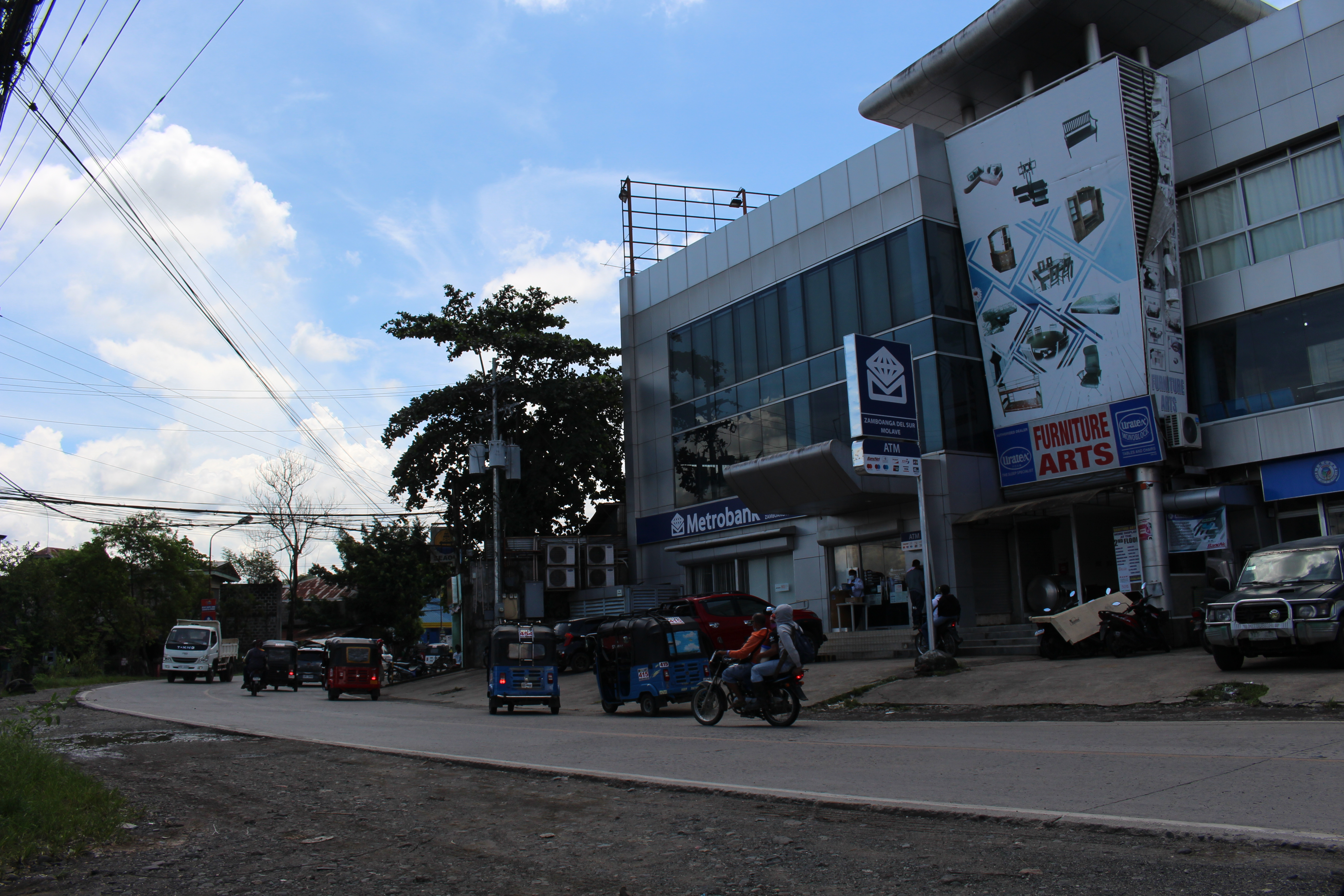
- Portion of Molave's Poblacion

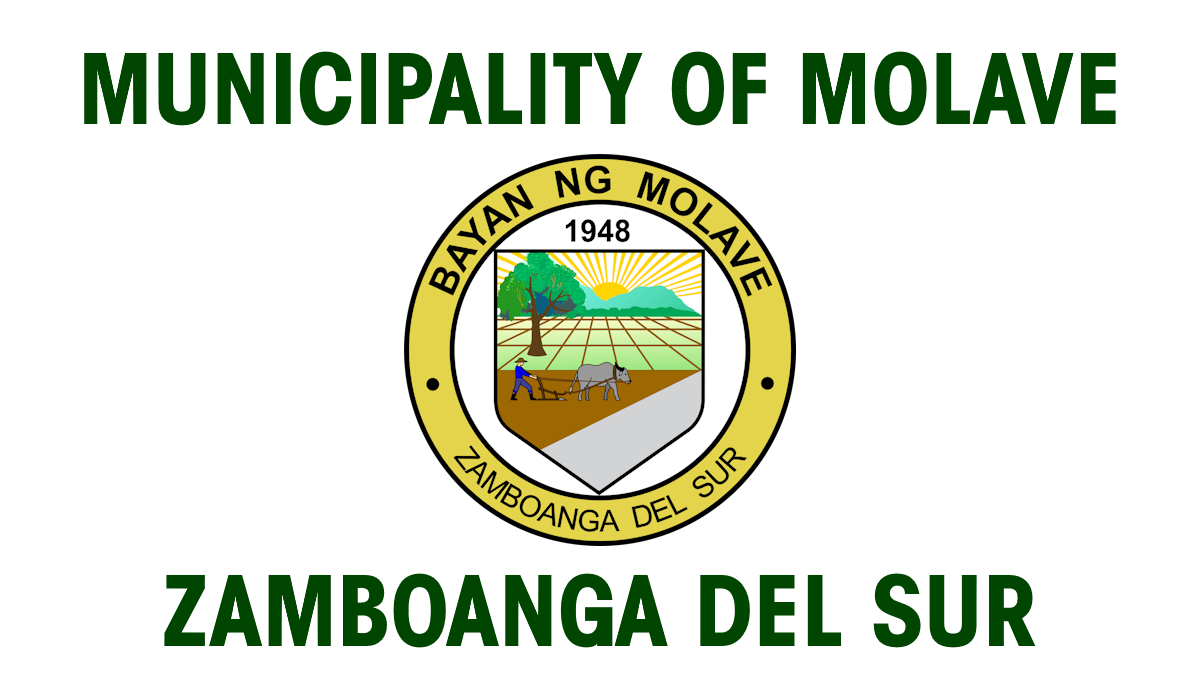
- Flag Seal

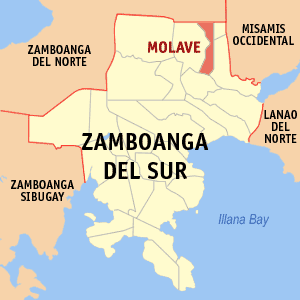
- Map of Zamboanga del Sur with Molave highlighted
- Interactive map of Molave
- Location in the Philippines
- Coordinates: 8°05′36″N 123°29′06″E
- Country: Philippines
- Region: Zamboanga Peninsula
- Province: Zamboanga del Sur
- District: 1st district
- Founded: June 16, 1948
- Barangays: List: 25 (see Barangays)

Government
  - Type: Sangguniang Bayan
  - Mayor: Cyril Reo A. Glepa
  - Vice Mayor: Monalisa J. Glepa
  - Representative: Divina Grace C. Yu
  - Municipal Council: Members: Desiderio L. Jabello; Victor Jose M. Geromo Jr.; Zadrac S. Bermejo; Jonathan S. Uy; Linda M. Saniel; Ricardo P. Golez; Jacosalem A. Perong Jr.; Illuwil D. Orbita
  - Electorate: 33,459 voters (2025)

Area
  - Total: 251.50 km^{2} (97.10 sq mi)
- Elevation: 50 m (160 ft)
- Highest elevation: 303 m (994 ft)
- Lowest elevation: 11 m (36 ft)

Population (2024 census)
  - Total: 52,540
  - Density: 208.9/km^{2} (541.1/sq mi)
  - Households: 11,937

Economy
  - Income class: 1st municipal income class
  - Poverty incidence: 26.34% (2023)
  - Revenue: ₱ 344.4 million (2024)
  - Assets: ₱ 1,441 million (2024)
  - Expenditure: ₱ 121.2 million (2024)
  - Liabilities: ₱ 413.7 million (2024)

Service provider
  - Electricity: Zamboanga del Sur 1 Electric Cooperative (ZAMSURECO 1)
- Time zone: UTC+8 (PST)
- ZIP code: 7023
- PSGC: 0907319000
- IDD : area code: +63 (0)62
- Native languages: Subanon; Cebuano; Chavacano; Tagalog
- Website: molave.gov.ph

Molave, officially known as the Municipality of Molave (Cebuano: Lungsod sa Molave; Subanen: Benwa Molave; Chavacano: Municipalidad de Molave; Maranao: Inged a Molave; Tagalog: Bayan ng Molave), is a municipality in the province of Zamboanga del Sur, Philippines. In the 2024 census, it had 52,540 people. It is in the eastern part of the province of Zamboanga del Sur, and has an area of 21,685 hectares (83.73 square miles).

== History ==
The name "Molave" refers to the tree (and its hardwood) that was common in the area. Its economy is focused on agricultural production, and 1,378.5 hectares (3,406 acres) of fertile land is irrigated and planted with rice. Corn, coconut, cassava, banana, camote and various vegetables are also grown. These are marketed to neighboring towns and cities, and reach Cebu. Due to its strategic location, Molave is becoming the commercial hub of the Salug Valley. It is the most populous municipality in Zamboanga del Sur, and the third most populous in Region IX.

Molave originated during the 1930s as a small settlement in a marshy jungle, originally known as Salug. The Subanons were early settlers of the area; the fertile land of the Salug Valley later attracted settlers from throughout the Philippines, making the area ethnically diverse. On June 16, 1948, the settlement was separated from the municipality of Aurora as a separate municipality and designated the new capital of the province of Zamboanga. Molave was the provincial capital until Zamboanga was divided into the provinces of Zamboanga del Norte and Zamboanga del Sur; it became part of Zamboanga del Sur, with the town of Pagadian as its capital.

== Geography ==
Molave is in the northeastern part of the province of Zamboanga del Sur, at the foot of a hill, and is bounded by the Salug River and mountains which protect it from typhoons. It is bordered by the municipalities of Tambulig in the east, Mahayag in the west, Josefina and Province of Zamboanga del Norte in the north, and Ramon Magsaysay in the south. Molave is about 38 kilometres (24 mi) from Pagadian, the provincial capital, and 58 kilometres (36 mi) from Ozamiz. It is 15 metres (49 ft) above sea level.

=== Topography ===
Molave is divided into two topographical areas. The east and southwest lowlands, which cover 30 percent of its total land area, consist of nine barangays and are generally flat, swampy and marshy. The upland, which covers 70 percent of Molave's total area, is hilly and mostly deforested. The terrain is moderately sloping to rolling, with the overall grade varying from 10 percent in the lowlands to 27 percent in the mountains.

The municipality has two types of soil. The lowlands and part of the upper barangays are composed of San Miguel silt loam, and is well-suited for cultivation. Adtoyon clay loam is found in the upland areas, and can be used for grazing and a variety of crops such as corn, cassava, and camote.

=== Climate ===
Climate data for Molave, Zamboanga del Sur
Month	Jan	Feb	Mar	Apr	May	Jun	Jul	Aug	Sep	Oct	Nov	Dec	Year
Mean daily maximum °C (°F)	30 (86)	31 (88)	31 (88)	32 (90)	30 (86)	30 (86)	29 (84)	29 (84)	30 (86)	29 (84)	30 (86)	30 (86)	30 (86)
Mean daily minimum °C (°F)	23 (73)	23 (73)	23 (73)	24 (75)	24 (75)	24 (75)	24 (75)	24 (75)	24 (75)	24 (75)	24 (75)	23 (73)	24 (74)
Average precipitation mm (inches)	48 (1.9)	44 (1.7)	56 (2.2)	56 (2.2)	112 (4.4)	135 (5.3)	124 (4.9)	124 (4.9)	115 (4.5)	134 (5.3)	90 (3.5)	56 (2.2)	1,094 (43)
Average rainy days	13.0	11.7	15.6	18.1	25.6	25.7	25.2	24.1	23.8	26.1	22.3	16.5	247.7
Source: Meteoblue

Molave is the fourth type on the PAGASA climatology map, with rainfall evenly distributed throughout the year. Its average temperature is 29.7 °C (85.5 °F).

=== Barangays ===
Molave is divided into 25 barangays. Each barangay consists of puroks while some have sitios.

- Alicia
- Ariosa
- Bagong Argao
- Bagong Gutlang
- Blancia
- Bogo Capalaran
- Culo
- Dalaon
- Dipolo
- Dontulan
- Gonosan
- Lower Dimalinao
- Pablo Bahinting Sr. (Lower Dimorok)
- Mabuhay
- Madasigon (Poblacion)
- Makuguihon (Poblacion)
- Maloloy-on (Poblacion)
- Miligan
- Parasan
- Rizal
- Santo Rosario
- Silangit
- Simata
- Sudlon
- Upper Dimorok

== Demographics ==
Population of Molave
Year	Pop.	±% p.a.
1960	38,568	—
1970	21,579	−5.64%
1975	22,363	+0.72%
1980	29,698	+5.84%
1990	36,556	+2.10%
1995	40,423	+1.90%
2000	45,082	+2.37%
2007	48,215	+0.93%
2010	48,939	+0.54%
2015	52,006	+1.16%
2020	53,140	+0.46%
2024	52,540	−0.27%
Source: Philippine Statistics Authority

== Economy ==
Poverty incidence of Molave (%)

Source: Philippine Statistics Authority

- Gross sales of registered companies: ₱1,358,640,795
- Total capitalization of new businesses, 2015: ₱150,000,000
- Growth of capitalization of new businesses, 2014–2015: 286.9 percent

Molave is the commercial hub of the Salug Valley. Rice trading, milling and farming are major agricultural industries, others are major non-agricultural products such as the glass and aluminum by the 31 year old Molave Glass House of the Arapoc Family. Molave's economy is focused on agricultural production; 91.85 percent of its total land area is devoted to agriculture, and 1,378.5 hectares (3,406 acres) are irrigated and planted with rice. Corn, coconut, cassava, bananas, camote, and other vegetables are also grown. They are marketed to neighboring towns and cities as far as Cebu. Molave has 23 farmer cooperatives (19 of which are registered), with a total membership of 7,566.

== Healthcare ==
Molave has ten barangay health stations, one maternity clinic, 26 health and nutrition posts, and a municipal health center staffed by one rural-health physician, one dentist, one sanitary inspector, three nurses and 11 midwives. It has three private hospitals (Lumapas Hospital, Salug Valley Medical Center and Blancia Hospital), five private clinics, ten pharmacies, and two funeral chapels, the oldest being the Valley of Angels Memorial Chapels establish in 1967 by the Arapoc Family and now has their newly renovated state of the art 2 storey memorial chapels with elevator that offers embalming, burial and air con and non aircon chapels.

== Sports and recreation ==
Sports facilities include a municipal gymnasium, three tennis courts, four basketball courts, three volleyball courts and the Molave Regional Pilot School sports complex. Molave also has a wide function hall offered by the now newly renovated Courtyard Business Hotel in Rizal Avenue which is owned by businessman and socialite Stephen Agbu Arapoc. A landscaped municipal plaza has a playground. A driving range is in the barangay of Parasan, 4 kilometres (2.5 mi) from Molave.

== Law enforcement ==
The Molave Municipal Police station has two commissioned officers and 24 non-commissioned officers. It has two outposts, in the Dipolo and Sudlon barangays. Crime has decreased in recent years, and the 10th Infantry Battalion of the 1st Infantry Division (stationed in Barangay Bag-ong Argao) and the 906th Provincial Mobile Group help to maintain order.

== Education ==
Molave has four private preschools, 23 public and one private elementary school, six primary schools, five secondary schools and four tertiary schools. The secondary schools are:

- Blancia Carreon College Foundation, Inc. (High School Department)
- Molave Vocational Technical School (MVTS)
- Parasan National High School
- Sacred Heart Diocesan School
- Simata National High School

The tertiary schools are:

- J.H. Cerilles State College, Molave Campus
- Our Lady Of Triumph Institute of Technology, Molave
- Western Mindanao State University - External Studies Unit, Molave
- Zamboanga del Sur Maritime Institute of Technology
