= Maguikay =

Maguikay may refer to any of the following places in the Philippines:

- Maguikay, a barangay in the city of Mandaue
- Maguikay, a barangay in the municipality of Aurora, Zamboanga del Sur
