= Zamboanga del Sur Agricultural College =

Public college in Zamboanga del Sur, Philippines

Coordinates: 6.9138°N 122.0614°E

Zamboanga del Sur Agricultural College was the former name of the Dumingag campus of Western Mindanao State University in Mindanao, Philippines. By virtue of Batas Pambansa Blg. 385, passed by the Batasan Pambansa on April 14, 1983, the Zamboanga del Sur National Agricultural School in Dumingag, Zamboanga del Sur was converted into a college and renamed as Zamboanga del Sur Agricultural College.
