= Zamboanga del Sur's 1st congressional district =

Legislative district of the Philippines

- Constituency for the House of Representatives of the Philippines
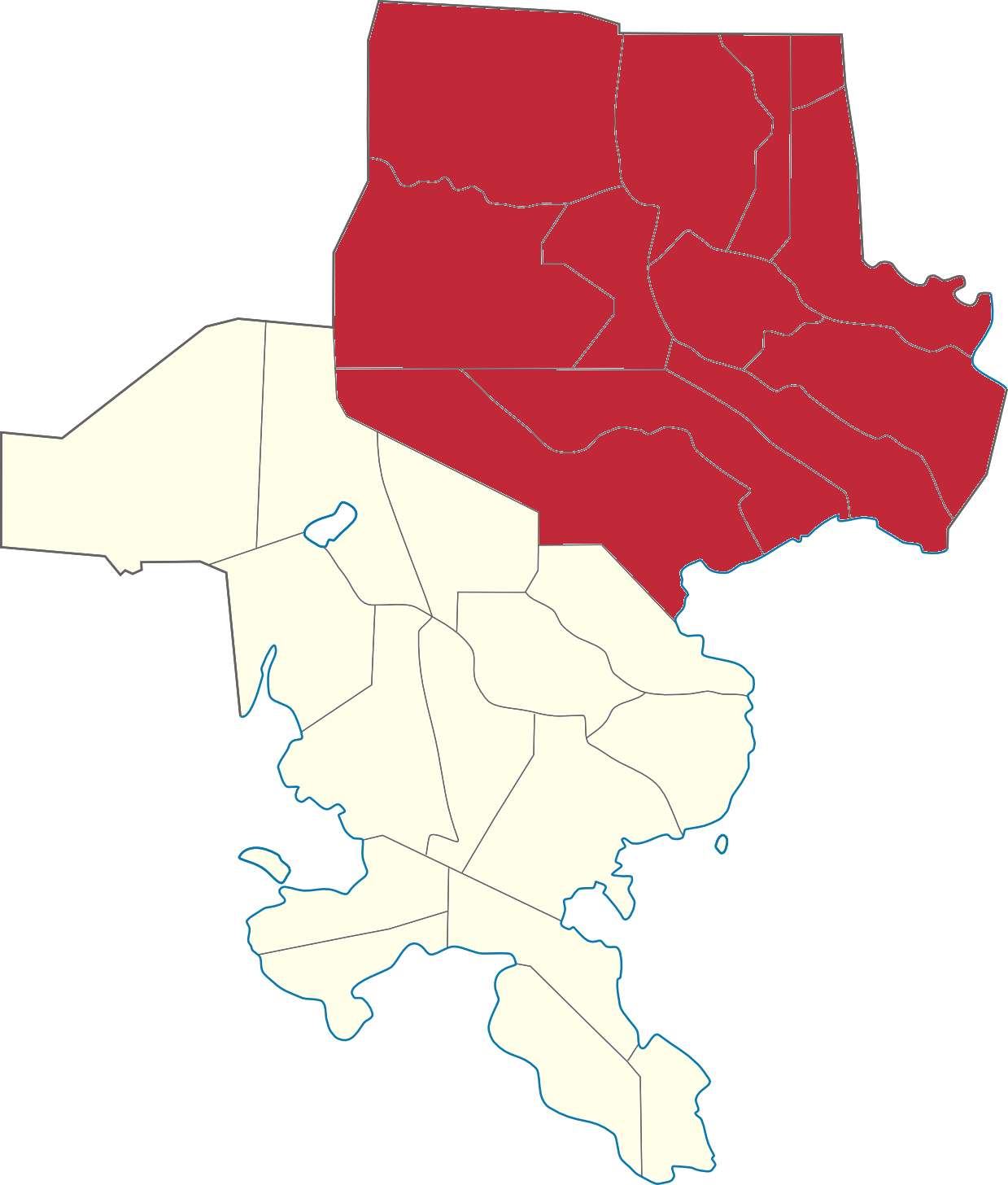
- Boundary of Zamboanga del Sur's 1st congressional district in Zamboanga del Sur

- Location of Zamboanga del Sur within the Philippines
- Province: Zamboanga del Sur
- Region: Zamboanga Peninsula
- Population: 630,154 (2020)
- Electorate: 415,735 (2022)
- Major settlements: 12 LGUs: Cities; Pagadian; Municipalities; Aurora; Dumingag; Josefina; Labangan; Mahayag; Midsalip; Molave; Ramon Magsaysay; Sominot; Tambulig; Tukuran
- Area: 2,180.49 km^{2} (841.89 sq mi)

Current constituency
- Created: 1987
- Representative: Joseph Yu
- Political party: Lakas–CMD
- Congressional bloc: Majority

Zamboanga del Sur's 1st congressional district is one of the two congressional districts of the Philippines in the province of Zamboanga del Sur. It has been represented in the House of Representatives since 1987. The district encompasses the northern half of the province consisting of its provincial capital city of Pagadian and the municipalities of Aurora, Dumingag, Josefina, Labangan, Mahayag, Midsalip, Molave, Ramon Magsaysay, Sominot, Tambulig and Tukuran. It is currently represented in the 20th Congress by Joseph Yu of the Lakas–CMD.

== Representation history ==
#	Image	Member	Term of office		Congress	Party	Electoral history	Constituent LGUs
#	Image	Member	Start	End	Congress	Party	Electoral history	Constituent LGUs
=== Zamboanga del Sur's 1st district for the House of Representatives of the Philippines ===
District created February 2, 1987 from Zamboanga del Sur's at-large district.
1		Isidoro E. Real Jr.	June 30, 1987	June 30, 1992	8th	PDP–Laban	Elected in 1987.	1987–1992; Aurora, Don Mariano Marcos, Dumingag, Josefina, Labangan, Mahayag, Midsalip, Molave, Pagadian, Ramon Magsaysay, Tambulig, Tukuran
2		Alejandro S. Urro	June 30, 1992	June 30, 2001	9th	Lakas	Elected in 1992.	1992–present Aurora, Dumingag, Josefina, Labangan, Mahayag, Midsalip, Molave, Pagadian, Ramon Magsaysay, Sominot, Tambulig, Tukuran
2		Alejandro S. Urro	June 30, 1992	June 30, 2001	10th	Lakas	Re-elected in 1995.	1992–present Aurora, Dumingag, Josefina, Labangan, Mahayag, Midsalip, Molave, Pagadian, Ramon Magsaysay, Sominot, Tambulig, Tukuran
2		Alejandro S. Urro	June 30, 1992	June 30, 2001	11th	LDP	Re-elected in 1998.	1992–present Aurora, Dumingag, Josefina, Labangan, Mahayag, Midsalip, Molave, Pagadian, Ramon Magsaysay, Sominot, Tambulig, Tukuran
(1)		Isidoro E. Real Jr.	June 30, 2001	June 30, 2007	12th	Lakas	Elected in 2001.	1992–present Aurora, Dumingag, Josefina, Labangan, Mahayag, Midsalip, Molave, Pagadian, Ramon Magsaysay, Sominot, Tambulig, Tukuran
(1)		Isidoro E. Real Jr.	June 30, 2001	June 30, 2007	13th	Lakas	Re-elected in 2004.	1992–present Aurora, Dumingag, Josefina, Labangan, Mahayag, Midsalip, Molave, Pagadian, Ramon Magsaysay, Sominot, Tambulig, Tukuran
3		Victor J. Yu	June 30, 2007	June 30, 2016	14th	NPC	Elected in 2007.	1992–present Aurora, Dumingag, Josefina, Labangan, Mahayag, Midsalip, Molave, Pagadian, Ramon Magsaysay, Sominot, Tambulig, Tukuran
3		Victor J. Yu	June 30, 2007	June 30, 2016	15th	NPC	Re-elected in 2010.	1992–present Aurora, Dumingag, Josefina, Labangan, Mahayag, Midsalip, Molave, Pagadian, Ramon Magsaysay, Sominot, Tambulig, Tukuran
3		Victor J. Yu	June 30, 2007	June 30, 2016	16th	NPC	Re-elected in 2013.	1992–present Aurora, Dumingag, Josefina, Labangan, Mahayag, Midsalip, Molave, Pagadian, Ramon Magsaysay, Sominot, Tambulig, Tukuran
4		Divina Grace C. Yu	June 30, 2016	June 30, 2025	17th	NPC	Elected in 2016.	1992–present Aurora, Dumingag, Josefina, Labangan, Mahayag, Midsalip, Molave, Pagadian, Ramon Magsaysay, Sominot, Tambulig, Tukuran
4		Divina Grace C. Yu	June 30, 2016	June 30, 2025	18th	PDP–Laban	Re-elected in 2019.	1992–present Aurora, Dumingag, Josefina, Labangan, Mahayag, Midsalip, Molave, Pagadian, Ramon Magsaysay, Sominot, Tambulig, Tukuran
4		Divina Grace C. Yu	June 30, 2016	June 30, 2025	19th	Lakas	Re-elected in 2022.	1992–present Aurora, Dumingag, Josefina, Labangan, Mahayag, Midsalip, Molave, Pagadian, Ramon Magsaysay, Sominot, Tambulig, Tukuran
5		Joseph Yu	June 30, 2025	Incumbent	20th	Lakas	Elected in 2025.	1992–present Aurora, Dumingag, Josefina, Labangan, Mahayag, Midsalip, Molave, Pagadian, Ramon Magsaysay, Sominot, Tambulig, Tukuran

== Election results ==
=== 2025 ===
Term-limited incumbent Divina Grace Yu of Lakas–CMD ran for governor of Zamboanga del Sur. She was previously affiliated with PDP–Laban.

Lakas–CMD nominated Yu's son, Joseph Yu, who won the election against Labangan mayor Eddie Relacion (Nationalist People's Coalition).

Candidate	Party	Votes	%
Joseph Yu	Lakas–CMD	190,907	58.32
Eddie Relacion	Nationalist People's Coalition	136,415	41.68
Total		327,322	100.00
Valid votes		327,322	89.88
Invalid/blank votes		36,874	10.12
Total votes		364,196	100.00
Registered voters/turnout		429,807	84.73
Lakas–CMD hold			
Source: Commission on Elections

=== 2022 ===
Incumbent Divina Grace Yu of PDP–Laban ran for a third term.

Candidate	Party	Votes	%
Divina Grace Yu (incumbent)	PDP–Laban	166,432	52.89
Edmario Revelo	People's Reform Party	131,421	41.77
Archie Yongco	Nationalist People's Coalition	15,581	4.95
Dell Ceniza Supapo	Reform Party	1,223	0.39
Total		314,657	100.00
Total votes		353,711	–
Registered voters/turnout		415,735	85.08
PDP–Laban hold			
Source: Commission on Elections

=== 2019 ===
Divina Grace Yu was the Incumbent.

2019 Philippine House of Representatives election at Zamboanga del Sur's 1st District
Party	Candidate	Votes	%
PDP–Laban	Divina Grace Yu	164,990	
Nacionalista	Marlyn Revelo	119,141	
Total votes		284,131	
PDP–Laban gain from Nacionalista			

=== 2016 ===
Victor Yu is the incumbent but ineligible for reelection. His party nominated his wife, Divina Grace Yu.

2016 Philippine House of Representatives election at Zamboanga del Sur's 1st District
Party	Candidate	Votes	%
NPC	Divina Grace Yu	180,705	83.004
NUP	Alex Acain	37,000	16.995
Total votes		217,705	
NPC hold			

=== 2013 ===
Victor Yu was the incumbent.

2013 Philippine House of Representatives election at Zamboanga del Sur's 1st district
Party	Candidate	Votes	%	±%
NPC	Victor Yu	72,593		
Liberal	Samuel Co	50,026		
Margin of victory				
Rejected ballots				
Turnout				
NPC hold		Swing		

=== 2010 ===
Victor Yu is the incumbent.

Philippine House of Representatives election at Zamboanga del Sur's 1st district
Party	Candidate	Votes	%
NPC	Victor Yu	162,787	75.22
Liberal	Romeo Vera Cruz	53,634	24.78
Valid ballots		216,421	90.52
Invalid or blank votes		22,654	9.48
Total votes		239,075	100.00
NPC hold			

== See also ==
- Legislative districts of Zamboanga del Sur
