= Josefina, Zamboanga del Sur =

Municipality in Zamboanga del Sur, Philippines

Josefina Gumahan
- Municipality
- Municipality of Josefina
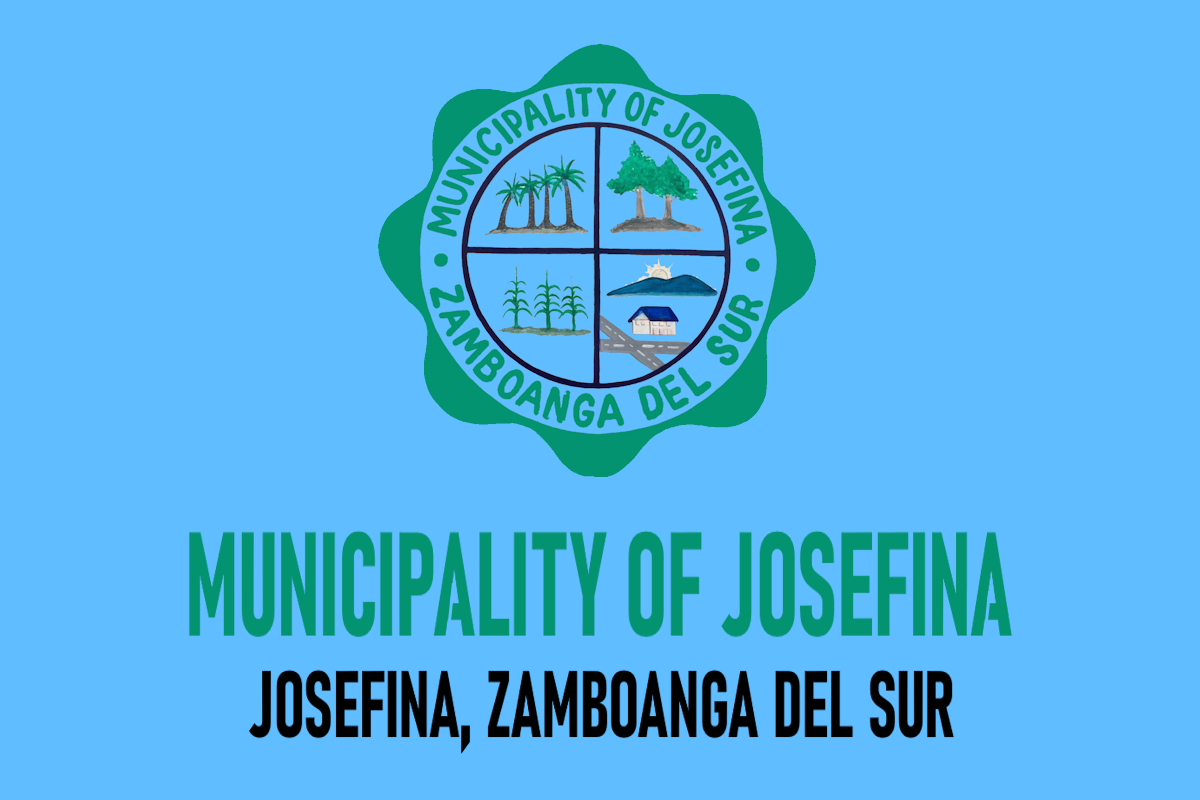
- Flag Seal

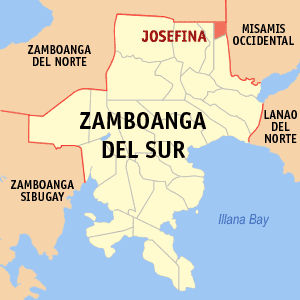
- Map of Zamboanga del Sur with Josefina highlighted
- Interactive map of Josefina
- Location within the Philippines
- Coordinates: 8°12′52″N 123°32′38″E
- Country: Philippines
- Region: Zamboanga Peninsula
- Province: Zamboanga del Sur
- District: 1st district
- Founded: November 11, 1977
- Named for: Josefina Herrera Cerilles
- Barangays: 14 (see Barangays)

Government
  - Type: Sangguniang Bayan
  - Mayor: Catalino A. Adapon
  - Vice Mayor: Alberto M. Etulle
  - Representative: Divina Grace C. Yu
  - Municipal Council: Members: Perly Rey T. Flores; Melred A. Mag-usara; Benjamin D. Jaicten; Manuel D. Bersaga; Raul P. Samson Sr.; Jaime N. Libre; Eulogio P. Moñeza; Nenita P. Espinosa
  - Electorate: 7,971 voters (2025)

Area
  - Total: 56.35 km^{2} (21.76 sq mi)
- Elevation: 645 m (2,116 ft)
- Highest elevation: 1,434 m (4,705 ft)
- Lowest elevation: 288 m (945 ft)

Population (2024 census)
  - Total: 11,190
  - Density: 198.6/km^{2} (514.3/sq mi)
  - Households: 2,986

Economy
  - Income class: 4th municipal income class
  - Poverty incidence: 34.03% (2023)
  - Revenue: ₱ 98.68 million (2024)
  - Assets: ₱ 416 million (2024)
  - Expenditure: ₱ 15.03 million (2024)
  - Liabilities: ₱ 45.7 million (2024)

Service provider
  - Electricity: Zamboanga del Sur 1 Electric Cooperative (ZAMSURECO 1)
- Time zone: UTC+8 (PST)
- ZIP code: 7027
- PSGC: 0907337000
- IDD : area code: +63 (0)62
- Native languages: Subanon; Cebuano; Chavacano; Tagalog
- Website: www.zds-josefina.gov.ph

Josefina, officially the Municipality of Josefina (Cebuano: Lungsod sa Josefina; Subanen: Benwa Josefina; Chavacano: Municipalidad de Josefina; Tagalog: Bayan ng Josefina), is a municipality in the province of Zamboanga del Sur, Philippines. According to the 2024 census, it has a population of 11,190 people, making it the least populated municipality in the province.

== History ==
In the early years the lands of which is now Josefina was part of the Municipality of Aurora. In later years, Molave separated from Aurora and became a town; at that time Tambulig and the area now within the jurisdiction of the present municipality were still part of the former. Some years later Tambulig became independent and was recognized as a township with the land of Josefina still tagged as part of its territories. During this time the first Visayan settlers came to live in the area. These settlers came from Tudela, Misamis Occidental, a barrio part of Tambulig was established and was named Bagong Tudela.

Some years passed and the Paredes family, one of the first settlers, was able to acquire properties there and named it "Salug Estate". A member of the family was a rubber technologist at that time and worked in Borneo. He brought along his lessons and expertise and together with the locals, "the Subanen", planted his land with Rubber Trees. By then the Rubber Technologist, Nicholas Paredes, coined the name "New Town" for the new rubber plantation.

With the rubber plantation, the place was then locally called as "Gumahan". This became a new trading center and small businesses came bustling. With the increased activity in this new location it was then christened as "Upper Bagong Tudela". This eventually became the center of the new community.

In the early 1970s, the people of Gumahan and its outlying barrios made a move, through the leadership of Nicholas Paredes, to create a town. They were able to submit the proposal to congress, through the sponsorship of then Cong. Cerilles, and it passed the 2nd congressional reading. When scheduled for the 3rd and final congressional reading, Martial Law was declared dissolving the Congress.

On November 11, 1978, by virtue of Presidential Decree 1240, 13 barangays of Tambulig were separated and formed into the independent municipality Josefina. During this time Nicholas Paredes (who was the point person of the township proposal) stood as the first Mayor (appointed). Mayor Paredes donated the land where now stands the Market Area, the school, the Municipal Hall and the Catholic Church. The town center is also located within the properties of the Paredes family.

Josefina was named after the mother of Congressman Cerilles, who was a known educator in Zamboanga Del Sur.

As to this day Josefina is still commonly known as "Gumahan".

== Geography ==
=== Barangays ===
Josefina is politically subdivided into 14 barangays. Each barangay consists of puroks while some have sitios.

- Bogo Calabat
- Dawa (Diwa)
- Ebarle
- Gumahan (Poblacion)
- Leonardo
- Litapan
- Lower Bagong Tudela
- Mansanas
- Moradji
- Nemeño
- Nopulan
- Sebukang
- Tagaytay Hill
- Upper Bagong Tudela (Poblacion)

=== Climate ===
Climate data for Josefina, Zamboanga del Sur
Month	Jan	Feb	Mar	Apr	May	Jun	Jul	Aug	Sep	Oct	Nov	Dec	Year
Mean daily maximum °C (°F)	24 (75)	25 (77)	26 (79)	27 (81)	27 (81)	27 (81)	26 (79)	27 (81)	27 (81)	26 (79)	26 (79)	25 (77)	26 (79)
Mean daily minimum °C (°F)	19 (66)	19 (66)	19 (66)	20 (68)	21 (70)	21 (70)	20 (68)	20 (68)	20 (68)	20 (68)	20 (68)	20 (68)	20 (68)
Average precipitation mm (inches)	69 (2.7)	44 (1.7)	37 (1.5)	29 (1.1)	87 (3.4)	137 (5.4)	131 (5.2)	141 (5.6)	143 (5.6)	134 (5.3)	68 (2.7)	53 (2.1)	1,073 (42.3)
Average rainy days	9.9	7.6	7.4	8.1	21.6	26.5	26.4	26.6	25.8	24.3	15.1	10.4	209.7
Source: Meteoblue

== Demographics ==
Population census of Josefina
Year	Pop.	±% p.a.
1980	6,755	—
1990	7,591	+1.17%
1995	9,024	+3.29%
2000	8,758	−0.64%
2007	10,796	+2.93%
2010	10,826	+0.10%
2015	11,799	+1.65%
2020	12,205	+0.71%
2024	11,190	−2.06%
Source: Philippine Statistics Authority

== Economy ==
Poverty incidence of Josefina (%)

Source: Philippine Statistics Authority
