= Midsalip =

Municipality in Zamboanga del Sur, Philippines

- Municipality
- Municipality of Midsalip
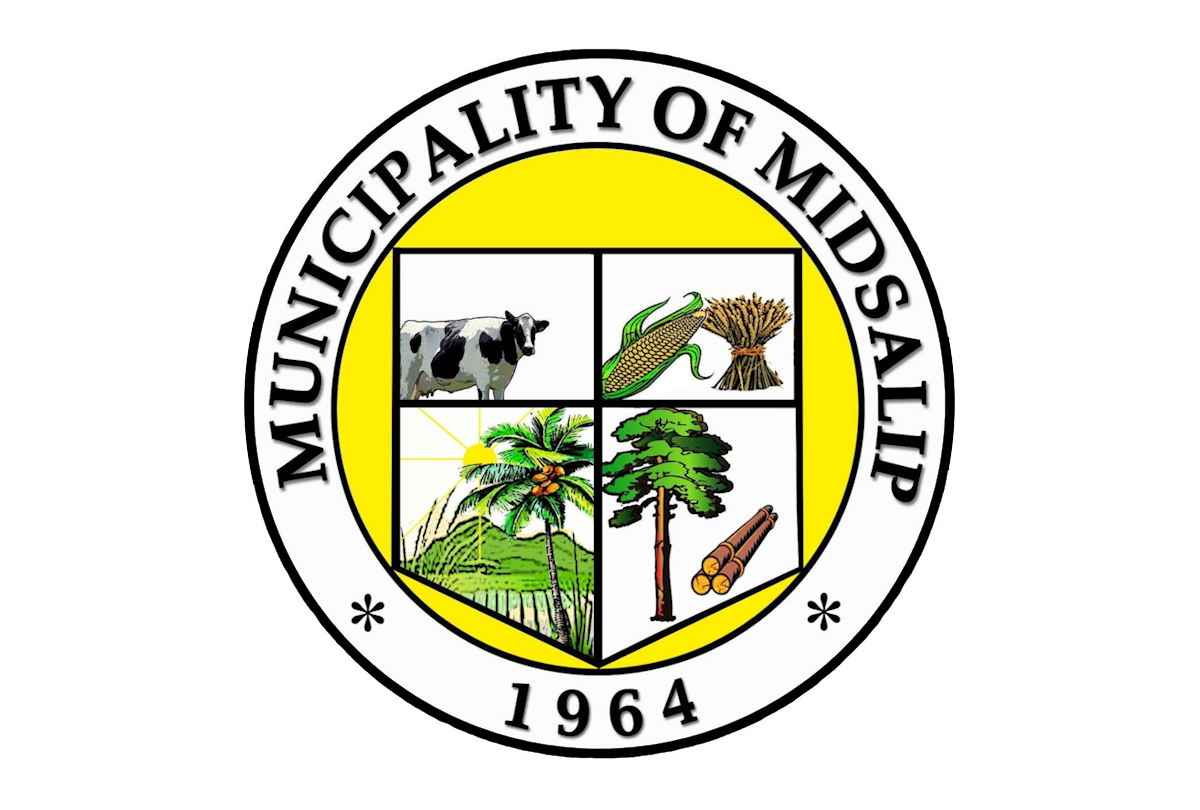
- Flag Seal

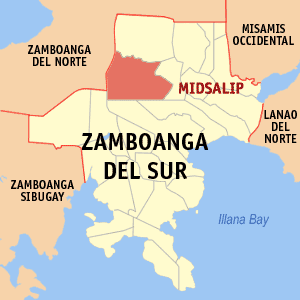
- Map of Zamboanga del Sur with Midsalip highlighted
- Interactive map of Midsalip
- Location within the Philippines
- Coordinates: 8°01′58″N 123°18′53″E
- Country: Philippines
- Region: Zamboanga Peninsula
- Province: Zamboanga del Sur
- District: 1st district
- Founded: September 9, 1964
- Barangays: 33 (see Barangays)

Government
  - Type: Sangguniang Bayan
  - Mayor: Elmer M. Soronio
  - Vice Mayor: Stewart R. Padayhag
  - Representative: Divina Grace C. Yu
  - Municipal Council: Members: Rudy R. Nacion; Osias L. Sullano; Darlito S. Mario; Bryan M. Dumandos; Joel B. Ordaniza; Jennefer M. Tapales; Rosalina U. Andilab; Alberto L. Sapinit
  - Electorate: 22,619 voters (2025)

Area
  - Total: 161.56 km^{2} (62.38 sq mi)
- Elevation: 399 m (1,309 ft)
- Highest elevation: 1,174 m (3,852 ft)
- Lowest elevation: 236 m (774 ft)

Population (2024 census)
  - Total: 35,643
  - Density: 220.62/km^{2} (571.40/sq mi)
  - Households: 7,531

Economy
  - Income class: 2nd municipal income class
  - Poverty incidence: 45.44% (2023)
  - Revenue: ₱ 176.5 million (2024)
  - Assets: ₱ 857.1 million (2024)
  - Expenditure: ₱ 59.2 million (2024)
  - Liabilities: ₱ 158.7 million (2024)

Service provider
  - Electricity: Zamboanga del Sur 1 Electric Cooperative (ZAMSURECO 1)
- Time zone: UTC+8 (PST)
- ZIP code: 7021
- PSGC: 0907318000
- IDD : area code: +63 (0)62
- Native languages: Subanon; Cebuano; Chavacano; Tagalog
- Website: www.zds-midsalip.gov.ph

Midsalip, officially the Municipality of Midsalip (Cebuano: Lungsod sa Midsalip; Subanen: Benwa Midsalip; Chavacano: Municipalidad de Midsalip; Tagalog: Bayan ng Midsalip), is a municipality in the province of Zamboanga del Sur, Philippines. According to the 2024 census, it has a population of 35,643 people.

== Etymology ==
The town's name is from a Subanen word,"Migsalip" which means "to collect" or "accumulate".

== History ==
Midsalip was formed as a municipality out of 21 barrios of the Municipality of Ramon Magsaysay and 6 barrios of the municipality of Dumingag on September 9, 1964, by virtue of Executive Order Number 94 signed by President Diosdado Macapagal. This did not last long, however, as it was dissolved on February 26, 1966, due to a Supreme Court decision regarding the legality of the funds disbursed by the municipal treasurer. As a result, Midsalip was reverted to barrio status. It was not until May 8, 1967, when the Republic Act No. 4871 was passed when Midsalip became a regular municipality again.

== Geography ==
=== Climate ===
Climate data for Midsalip, Zamboanga del Sur
Month	Jan	Feb	Mar	Apr	May	Jun	Jul	Aug	Sep	Oct	Nov	Dec	Year
Mean daily maximum °C (°F)	25 (77)	25 (77)	26 (79)	26 (79)	25 (77)	24 (75)	24 (75)	24 (75)	24 (75)	24 (75)	24 (75)	25 (77)	25 (76)
Mean daily minimum °C (°F)	17 (63)	17 (63)	18 (64)	18 (64)	19 (66)	19 (66)	18 (64)	18 (64)	18 (64)	19 (66)	18 (64)	18 (64)	18 (64)
Average precipitation mm (inches)	48 (1.9)	44 (1.7)	56 (2.2)	56 (2.2)	112 (4.4)	135 (5.3)	124 (4.9)	124 (4.9)	115 (4.5)	134 (5.3)	90 (3.5)	56 (2.2)	1,094 (43)
Average rainy days	13.0	11.7	15.6	18.1	25.6	25.7	25.2	24.1	23.8	26.1	22.3	16.5	247.7
Source: Meteoblue

=== Barangay captain names ===
Midsalip is politically subdivided into 33 barangays. Each barangay consists of puroks while some have sitios.

- Bacahan
- Balonai
- Bibilop
- Buloron
- Cabaloran
- Canipay Norte
- Canipay Sur
- Cumarom
- Dakayakan
- Duelic
- Dumalinao
- Ecuan
- Golictop
- Guinabot
- Guitalos
- Guma
- Kahayagan
- Licuro-an
- Lumpunid
- Matalang
- New Katipunan
- New Unidos
- Palili
- Pawan
- Pili
- Pisompongan
- Piwan
- Poblacion A
- Poblacion B
- Sigapod
- Timbaboy
- Tulbong
- Tuluan

== Demographics ==
Population census of Midsalip
Year	Pop.	±% p.a.
1970	17,397	—
1975	20,927	+3.77%
1980	24,624	+3.31%
1990	22,891	−0.73%
1995	25,258	+1.86%
2000	28,909	+2.94%
2007	30,772	+0.87%
2010	31,467	+0.82%
2015	32,075	+0.37%
2020	33,711	+1.05%
2024	35,643	+1.35%
Source: Philippine Statistics Authority

== Economy ==
Poverty incidence of Midsalip (%)

Source: Philippine Statistics Authority
