= Mahayag =

Municipality in Zamboanga del Sur, Philippines

- Municipality
- Municipality of Mahayag
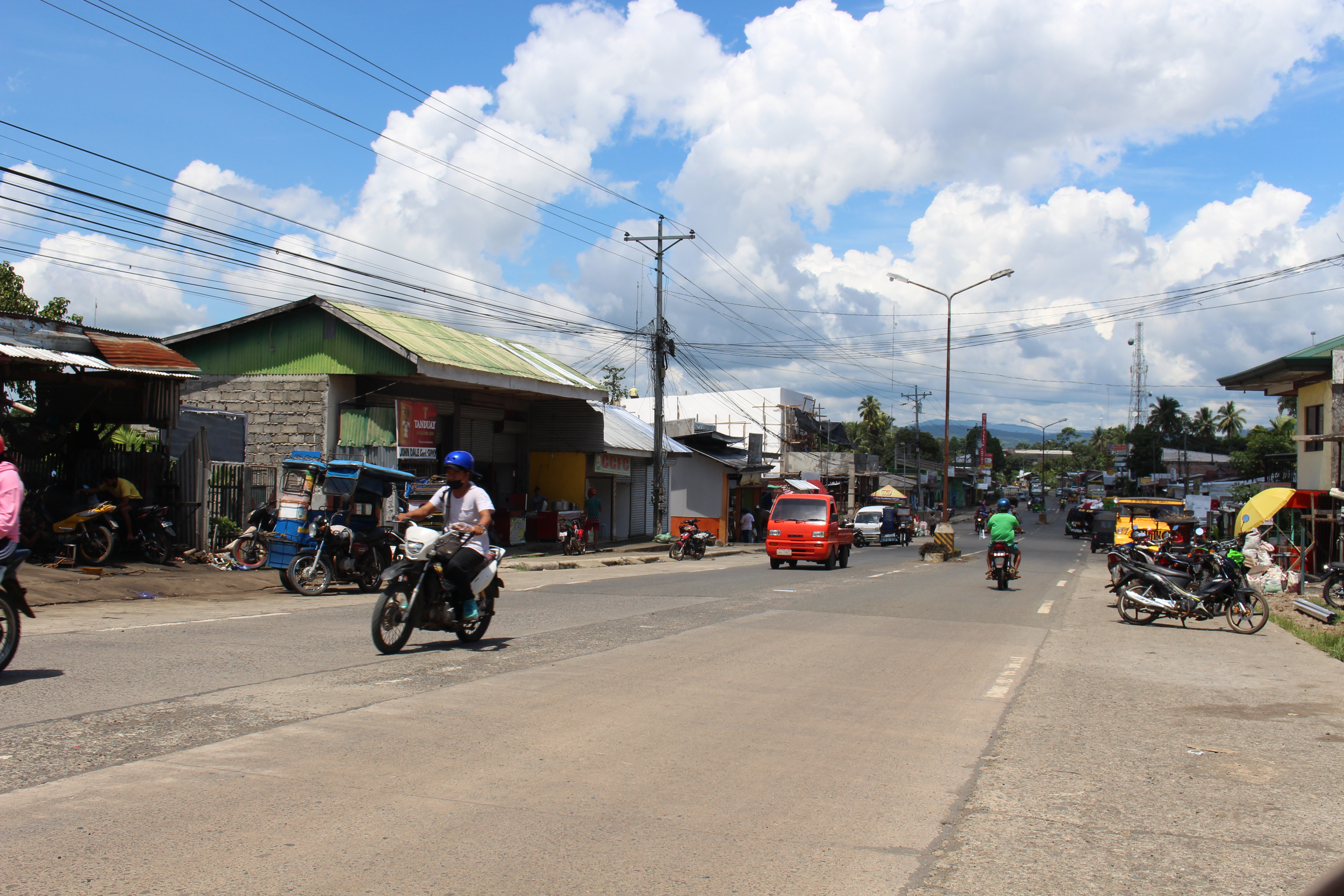
- Poblacion of Mahayag

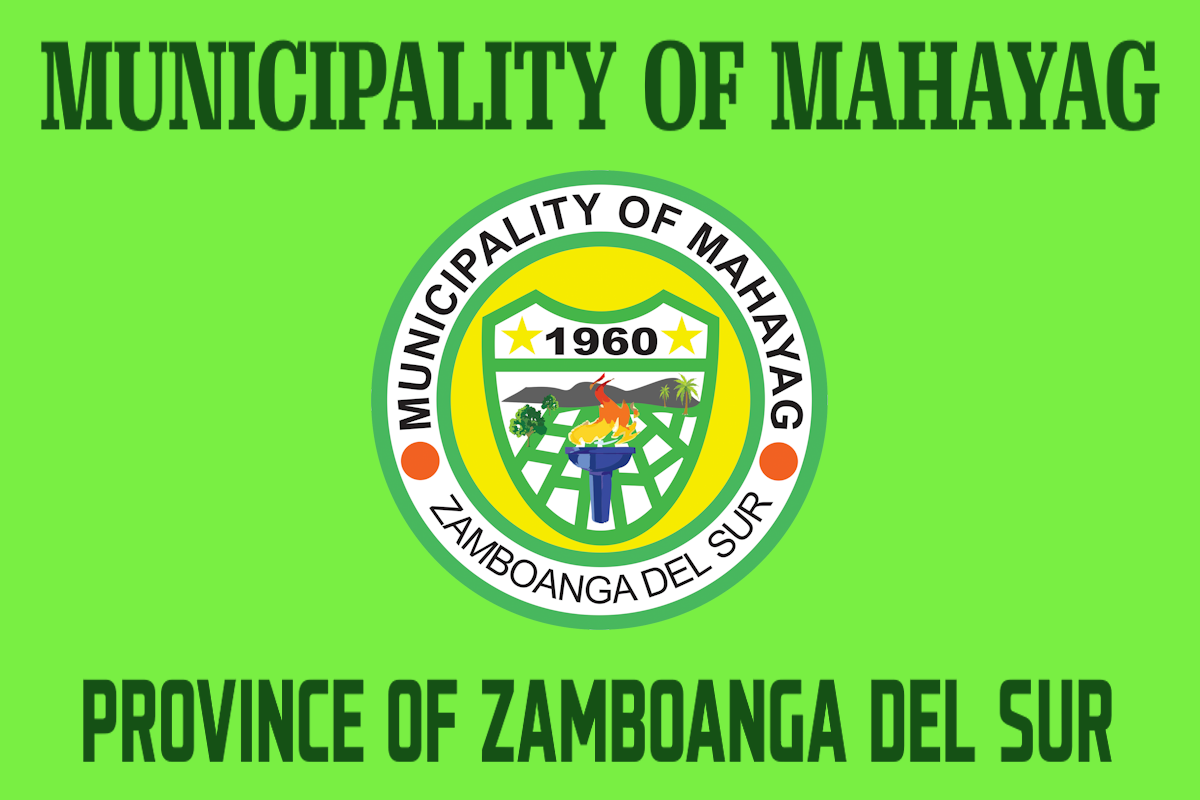
- Flag Seal

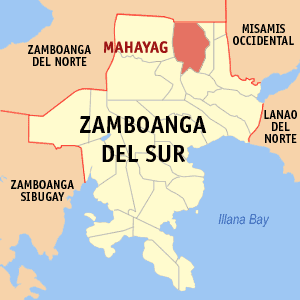
- Map of Zamboanga del Sur with Mahayag highlighted
- Interactive map of Mahayag
- Location within the Philippines
- Coordinates: 8°07′47″N 123°26′18″E
- Country: Philippines
- Region: Zamboanga Peninsula
- Province: Zamboanga del Sur
- District: 1st district
- Founded: March 9, 1960
- Barangays: 29 (see Barangays)

Government
  - Type: Sangguniang Bayan
  - Mayor: Manuel T. Saladaga
  - Vice Mayor: Lester Ace S. Espina
  - Representative: Divina Grace C. Yu
  - Municipal Council: Members: Teomila A. Noblezá; Felipe E. Caylan; Elmer C. Perez; Apolinar G. Sebandal; Felipe A. Capadngan; Eduardo B. Borado; Helen M. Maglasang; Antonio P. Watin
  - Electorate: 32,693 voters (2025)

Area
  - Total: 194.90 km^{2} (75.25 sq mi)
- Elevation: 64 m (210 ft)
- Highest elevation: 486 m (1,594 ft)
- Lowest elevation: 17 m (56 ft)

Population (2024 census)
  - Total: 48,695
  - Density: 249.85/km^{2} (647.10/sq mi)
  - Households: 11,185

Economy
  - Income class: 1st municipal income class
  - Poverty incidence: 32.6% (2023)
  - Revenue: ₱ 25.65 million (2024)
  - Assets: ₱ 820.9 million (2024)
  - Expenditure: ₱ 81.84 million (2024)
  - Liabilities: ₱ 157.4 million (2024)

Service provider
  - Electricity: Zamboanga del Sur 1 Electric Cooperative (ZAMSURECO 1)
- Time zone: UTC+8 (PST)
- ZIP code: 7026
- PSGC: 0907315000
- IDD : area code: +63 (0)62
- Native languages: Subanon; Cebuano; Chavacano; Tagalog
- Website: www.mahayag.gov.ph

Mahayag, officially the Municipality of Mahayag (Cebuano: Lungsod sa Mahayag; Subanen: Benwa Mahayag; Chavacano: Municipalidad de Mahayag; Tagalog: Bayan ng Mahayag), is a municipality in the province of Zamboanga del Sur, Philippines. According to the 2024 census, it has a population of 48,695 people.

== History ==
The Municipality of Mahayag was founded in 1960 by Executive Order No. 393, created from areas in the municipalities of Dumingag and Molave. The area now known as Mahayag was once an unfamiliar place, unmistakably swampy darkened by big trees, wild shrubs and marshes and the habitat of wildlife. The name Mahayag was derived from the Subanen dialect “Boyed Mahayag” a native term for forested and mountainous area. It was the Subanen tribe who first lived in the area, particularly along river banks since it is where their economic livelihood is situated.

During the early part of 1939, Christians explored and settled permanently in the plains of Mahayag in search of plain land for farming. The Subanen tribe retreated to mountainous areas and settled there.

Social and economic activities were being established such as “Taboan” hence; Christian settlers proposed that the place be named “Mahayag” a Cebuano term (ma = to become + hayag = bright) which means to become bright or sunny. When the Visayan migrant first trickled into the area after World War II, the place was heavily forested. Local historical sources said that when the large “DAO” trees which stand in the town site fell, the place became bright, hence the expression “MAHAYAG”.

Mahayag used to be sitio of Barangay Molave, Municipality of Aurora. Early settlers of the area had endeavored for the creation of another municipality to fast-track development, which is possible only by having a distinct political subdivision from the municipality of Molave. On May 9, 1960 by virtue of Executive Order No. 393 issued by His Excellency Carlos P. Garcia, Mahayag became an independent Municipality. The town site for the new municipality was donated by Mr. Zacarias dela Torre and Mr. Pedro Alquizar. The first appointed Municipal Mayor was Hon. Saturnino Mendoza. At present, Hon. Manuel T. Saladaga stands as the 13th Municipal Mayor elected in the Municipality of Mahayag.

== Geography ==
Mahayag is bordered by the municipalities of Dumingag, Sominot, Ramon Magsaysay, and Molave, as well as the municipality of Sergio Osmeña to the north in the province of Zamboanga Del Norte.

=== Climate ===
Climate data for Mahayag, Zamboanga del Sur
Month	Jan	Feb	Mar	Apr	May	Jun	Jul	Aug	Sep	Oct	Nov	Dec	Year
Mean daily maximum °C (°F)	30 (86)	30 (86)	31 (88)	32 (90)	30 (86)	30 (86)	29 (84)	29 (84)	30 (86)	29 (84)	30 (86)	30 (86)	30 (86)
Mean daily minimum °C (°F)	23 (73)	23 (73)	23 (73)	24 (75)	24 (75)	24 (75)	24 (75)	24 (75)	24 (75)	24 (75)	24 (75)	23 (73)	24 (74)
Average precipitation mm (inches)	48 (1.9)	44 (1.7)	56 (2.2)	56 (2.2)	112 (4.4)	135 (5.3)	124 (4.9)	124 (4.9)	115 (4.5)	134 (5.3)	90 (3.5)	56 (2.2)	1,094 (43)
Average rainy days	13.0	11.7	15.6	18.1	25.6	25.7	25.2	24.1	23.8	26.1	22.3	16.5	247.7
Source: Meteoblue

=== Barangays ===
Mahayag is politically subdivided into 29 barangays. Each barangay consists of puroks while some have sitios.

- Bag-ong Balamban
- Bag-ong Dalaguete
- Boniao
- Daniel C. Mantos (Sicpao)
- Delusom
- Diwan
- Guripan
- Kaangayan
- Kabuhi
- Lourmah (Lower Mahayag)
- Lower Salug Daku
- Lower Santo Niño
- Malubo
- Manguiles
- Marabanan (Balanan)
- Panagaan
- Paraiso
- Pedagan
- Pugwan
- Poblacion (Upper Mahayag)
- San Isidro
- San Jose
- San Vicente
- Santa Cruz
- Tuboran
- Tulan
- Tumapic
- Upper Salug Daku
- Upper Santo Niño

== Demographics ==
Population census of Mahayag
Year	Pop.	±% p.a.
1970	22,493	—
1975	25,305	+2.39%
1980	29,692	+3.25%
1990	37,690	+2.41%
1995	40,806	+1.50%
2000	42,462	+0.86%
2007	44,087	+0.52%
2010	45,015	+0.76%
2015	46,516	+0.63%
2020	48,258	+0.78%
2024	48,695	+0.22%
Source: Philippine Statistics Authority

== Economy ==
Poverty incidence of Mahayag (%)

Source: Philippine Statistics Authority

== Government ==
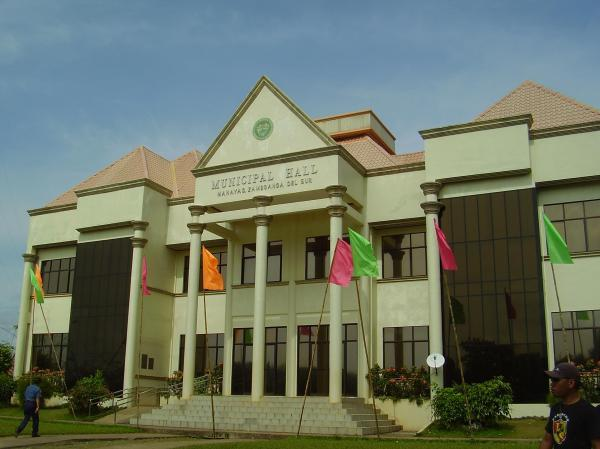
Municipal Hall

=== Elected officials ===
Members of the Mahayag Municipal Council (2019-2022) Municipal officials:

- Mayor Manuel Saladaga
- Vice Mayor Lester Ace S. Espina
- Councilors:
1. Teomila A. Nobleza
2. Felipe E. Caylan
3. Elmer Perez
4. Apolinar G. Sebandal
5. Felipe Capadngan
6. Eduardo B. Borado Jr
7. Helen M. Maglasang
8. Antonio Watin

== Tourism ==
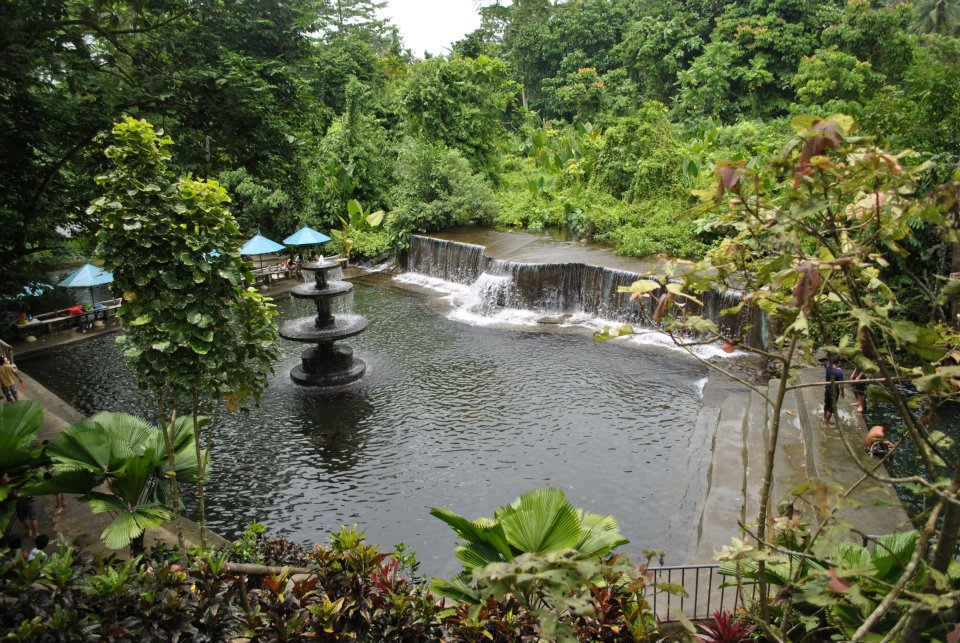
Eriberta Resorts

The town of Mahayag has a high eco-tourism potential, particularly, the cold springs in Barangay Tuburan, the cave system in Barangay Kaangayan, and the Salug River that traverses the Municipality.

Although the municipality has good eco-tourism potential, to date, only the cold springs in Barangay Tuburan have been developed as evidenced by the three private resorts in the area. This is the only tourist destination in Mahayag as of this time.

Government investment to promote and to develop eco-tourism remains to be desired. The cave system in Barangay Kaangayan, for example, due to its proximity to the national highway, can be developed to promote spelunking activities. On the one hand, studies can be undertaken on the feasibility of promoting whitewater rafting in the rapids of Salug River.

== Education ==
In addition to the daycare centers in each barangay, at least one public elementary school exists in each of the 29 barangays in the municipality.

There are six public high schools and one private high school run by the Catholic Church in the municipality.

Although permitted to operate and offer Collegiate courses since the later part of the 1990s, no tertiary courses had been offered by the Santa Maria Goretti Diocesan School except during the time when it served as an extension campus of the Saint Columban College, Pagadian City.

College students who cannot afford to obtain their education from far places like Ozamiz or Pagadian, may still enroll post secondary classes or TESDA accredited short-term courses at the Pagadian Institute of Technology (PIT) campus in Mahayag, and college degrees like Bachelor in Secondary Education (BSED), Bachelor in Elementary Education (BEED) and Associate in Information Technology (AIT) at Josefina H. Cerilles State College- Mahayag External Studies Unit.
