= Aurora, Zamboanga del Sur =

Municipality in Zamboanga del Sur, Philippines

Aurora
- Municipality
- Municipality of Aurora
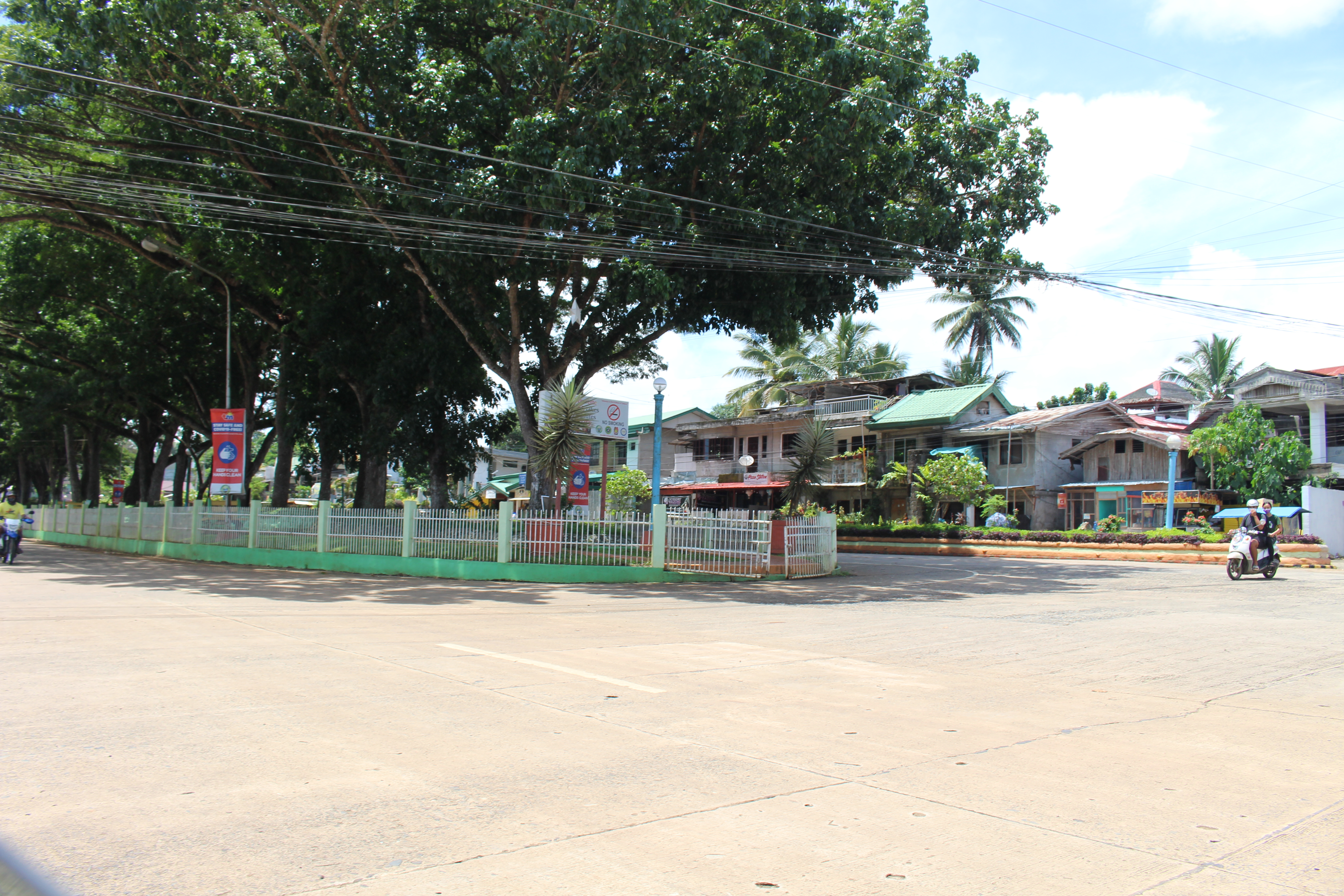
- Poblacion of Aurora

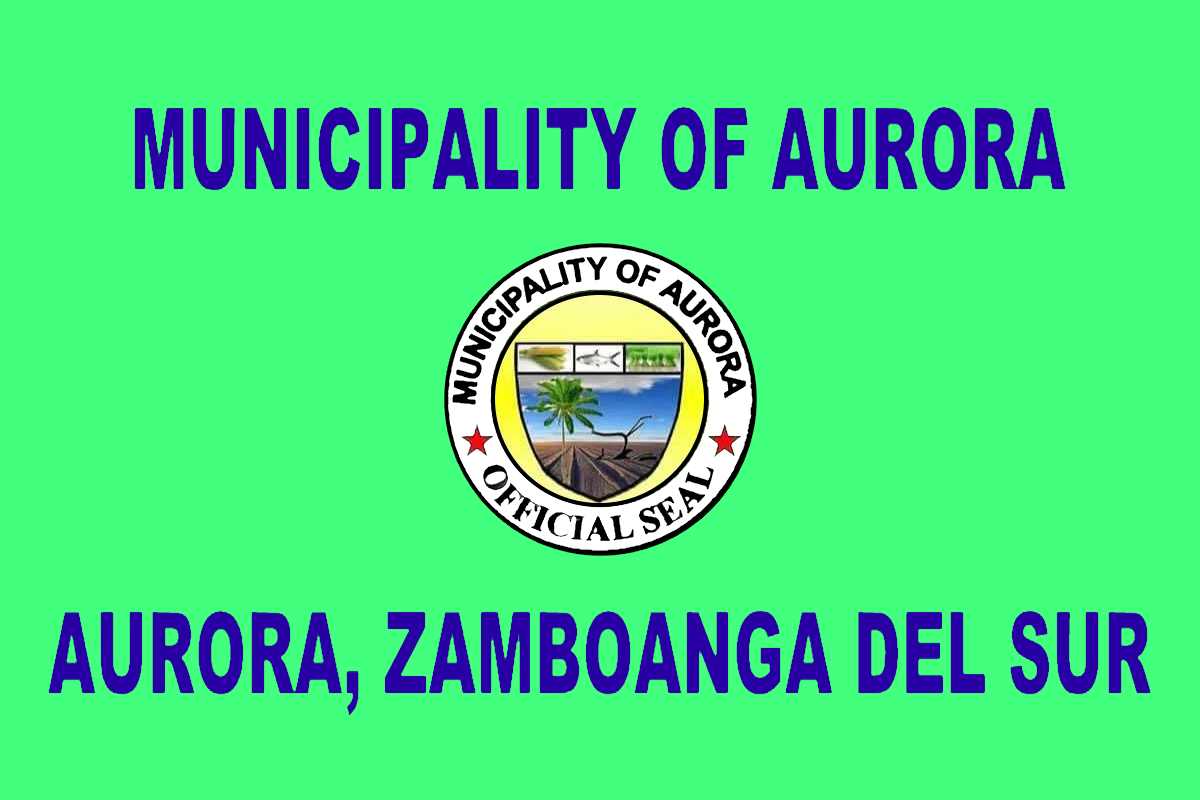
- Flag Seal

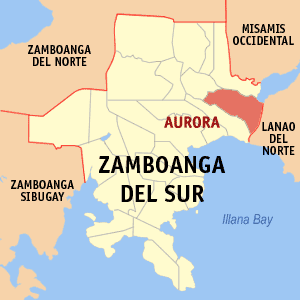
- Map of Zamboanga del Sur with Aurora highlighted
- Interactive map of Aurora
- Location within the Philippines
- Coordinates: 7°56′54″N 123°34′55″E
- Country: Philippines
- Region: Zamboanga Peninsula
- Province: Zamboanga del Sur
- District: 1st district
- Founded: January 1, 1942
- Named for: Aurora Quezon
- Barangays: 44 (see Barangays)

Government
  - Type: Sangguniang Bayan
  - Mayor: Silvano C. Zanoria
  - Vice Mayor: Jojo Palma
  - Representative: Divina Grace Yu
  - Municipal Council: Members: Bobong Ardiente; Caoky Ceniza; Boning Cabahug; Jerry Dongallo; Don Enriquez; Teddy Mayol; Gemar Quirim; Allan R. Godoy
  - Electorate: 37,413 voters (2025)

Area
  - Total: 180.95 km^{2} (69.87 sq mi)
- Elevation: 157 m (515 ft)
- Highest elevation: 501 m (1,644 ft)
- Lowest elevation: 0 m (0 ft)

Population (2024 census)
  - Total: 52,746
  - Density: 291.49/km^{2} (754.97/sq mi)
  - Households: 12,790

Economy
  - Income class: 1st municipal income class
  - Poverty incidence: 29.12% (2023)
  - Revenue: ₱ 321.1 million (2024)
  - Assets: ₱ 1,012 million (2024)
  - Expenditure: ₱ 88.75 million (2024)
  - Liabilities: ₱ 364 million (2024)

Service provider
  - Electricity: Zamboanga del Sur 1 Electric Cooperative (ZAMSURECO 1)
- Time zone: UTC+8 (PST)
- ZIP code: 7020
- PSGC: 0907302000
- IDD : area code: +63 (0)62
- Native languages: Subanon; Cebuano; Chavacano; Tagalog; Maguindanaon
- Website: aurorazds.gov.ph

Aurora, officially the Municipality of Aurora (Cebuano: Lungsod sa Aurora; Subanen: Benwa Aurora; Maguindanaon: Inged nu Awrura, Jawi: ايڠد نو اورور; Chavacano: Municipalidad de Aurora; Tagalog: Bayan ng Aurora), is a municipality in the province of Zamboanga del Sur, Philippines. According to the 2024 census, it has a population of 52,746 people.

The town was named after President Manuel L. Quezon's wife, Aurora Quezon.

== History ==
On July 1, 1941, the barrios of Cebuano Barracks, Parasan, and Tambulig were excised from Pagadian to form the new municipality of Aurora, then part of the undivided province Zamboanga, by virtue of Executive Order No. 353, signed by President Manuel L. Quezon. Cebuano Barracks was designated as the municipal seat. The new municipality was named after the President's wife, First Lady Aurora Quezon. The change took effect six months later, on January 1, 1942.

In 1948, a portion of Aurora was separated to form the town of Molave.

One June 6, 1952, Aurora became part of the new province of Zamboanga del Sur as a result of Zamboanga's division.

== Geography ==
Aurora is the easternmost municipality in Zamboanga del Sur, bounded by the Province of Lanao del Norte on its eastern side.

=== Barangays ===
Aurora is politically subdivided into 44 barangays. Each barangay consists of puroks while some have sitios.

- Acad
- Alang-alang
- Alegria
- Anonang
- Bagong Mandaue
- Bagong Maslog
- Bagong Oslob
- Bagong Pitogo
- Baki
- Balas
- Balide
- Balintawak
- Bayabas
- Bemposa
- Cabilinan
- Campo Uno
- Ceboneg
- Commonwealth
- Gubaan
- Inasagan
- Inroad
- Kahayagan East (Katipunan)
- Kahayagan West
- Kauswagan
- La Paz (Tinibtiban)
- La Victoria
- Lantungan
- Libertad
- Lintugop
- Lubid
- Maguikay
- Mahayahay
- Monte Alegre
- Montela
- Napo
- Panaghiusa
- Poblacion
- Resthouse
- Romarate
- San Jose
- San Juan
- Sapa Loboc
- Tagulalo
- Waterfall

=== Climate ===
Climate data for Aurora, Zamboanga del Sur
Month	Jan	Feb	Mar	Apr	May	Jun	Jul	Aug	Sep	Oct	Nov	Dec	Year
Mean daily maximum °C (°F)	28 (82)	28 (82)	29 (84)	30 (86)	29 (84)	28 (82)	28 (82)	28 (82)	28 (82)	28 (82)	28 (82)	28 (82)	28 (83)
Mean daily minimum °C (°F)	21 (70)	21 (70)	21 (70)	22 (72)	23 (73)	23 (73)	22 (72)	22 (72)	22 (72)	22 (72)	22 (72)	21 (70)	22 (72)
Average precipitation mm (inches)	69 (2.7)	58 (2.3)	67 (2.6)	60 (2.4)	109 (4.3)	114 (4.5)	83 (3.3)	78 (3.1)	76 (3.0)	92 (3.6)	86 (3.4)	63 (2.5)	955 (37.7)
Average rainy days	12.8	11.6	14.8	17.4	24.8	23.5	20.7	18.5	17.4	22.5	21.6	15.6	221.2
Source: Meteoblue

== Demographics ==
Population census of Aurora
Year	Pop.	±% p.a.
1948	35,090	—
1960	25,558	−2.61%
1970	25,975	+0.16%
1975	31,092	+3.67%
1980	37,248	+3.68%
1990	38,097	+0.23%
1995	40,157	+0.99%
2000	42,820	+1.39%
2007	47,177	+1.35%
2010	48,434	+0.96%
2015	50,755	+0.90%
2020	52,995	+0.91%
2024	52,746	−0.11%
Source: Philippine Statistics Authority

== Economy ==
Poverty incidence of Aurora (%)

Source: Philippine Statistics Authority
