= Tambulig =

Municipality in Zamboanga del Sur, Philippines

- Municipality
- Municipality of Tambulig
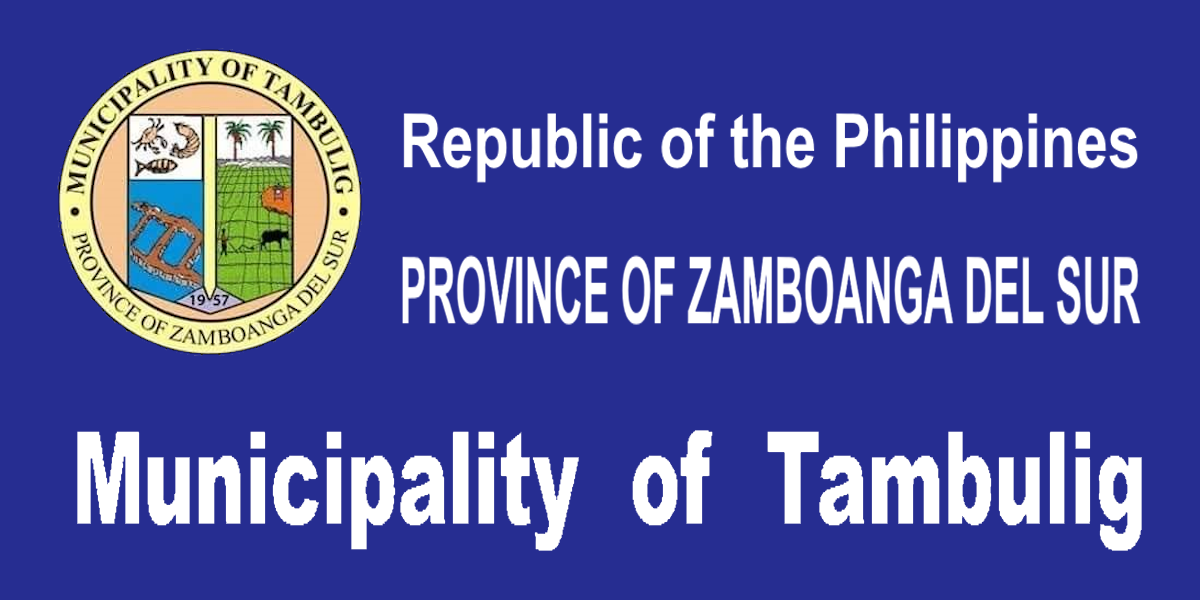
- Flag Seal

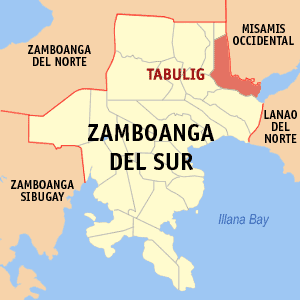
- Map of Zamboanga del Sur with Tambulig highlighted
- Interactive map of Tambulig
- Location within the Philippines
- Coordinates: 8°04′12″N 123°32′14″E
- Country: Philippines
- Region: Zamboanga Peninsula
- Province: Zamboanga del Sur
- District: 1st district
- Founded: December 27, 1957
- Barangays: 31 (see Barangays)

Government
  - Type: Sangguniang Bayan
  - Mayor: Ruel Omar L. Cabardo
  - Vice Mayor: Jonathan O. Butad
  - Representative: Joseph Yu
  - Municipal Council: Members: Caridad B. Balaod; Ysmher S. Upao; Algerica A. Hilaga; Mariecore H. Tumamak; Septeemy Beam Machon-Palumar; David J. Doong Sr.; Joe D. Malto; Aires E. Colegado
  - Electorate: 25,788 voters (2025)

Area
  - Total: 130.65 km^{2} (50.44 sq mi)
- Elevation: 76 m (249 ft)
- Highest elevation: 390 m (1,280 ft)
- Lowest elevation: 3 m (9.8 ft)

Population (2024 census)
  - Total: 37,400
  - Density: 286/km^{2} (741/sq mi)
  - Households: 8,656

Economy
  - Income class: 2nd municipal income class
  - Poverty incidence: 36.86% (2023)
  - Revenue: ₱ 190.7 million (2024)
  - Assets: ₱ 525.6 million (2024)
  - Expenditure: ₱ 32.41 million (2024)
  - Liabilities: ₱ 124.5 million (2024)

Service provider
  - Electricity: Zamboanga del Sur 1 Electric Cooperative (ZAMSURECO 1)
- Time zone: UTC+8 (PST)
- ZIP code: 7025
- PSGC: 0907328000
- IDD : area code: +63 (0)62
- Native languages: Subanon; Cebuano; Chavacano; Tagalog
- Website: www.zds-tambulig.gov.ph

Tambulig, officially the Municipality of Tambulig (Cebuano: Lungsod sa Tambulig; Subanen: Benwa Tambulig; Chavacano: Municipalidad de Tambulig; Tagalog: Bayan ng Tambulig), is a municipality in the province of Zamboanga del Sur, Philippines. According to the 2024 census, it has a population of 37,400 people.

== Geography ==
=== Barangays ===
Tambulig is politically subdivided into 31 barangays. Each barangay consists of puroks while some have sitios.

- Alang-alang
- Angeles
- Bag-ong Kauswagan
- Bag-ong Tabogon
- Balugo
- Cabgan
- Calolot
- Dimalinao
- Fabian (Balucot)
- Gabunon
- Happy Valley (Poblacion)
- Kapalaran
- Libato
- Limamaan
- Lower Liasan
- Lower Lodiong (Poblacion)
- Lower Tiparak
- Lower Usogan
- Maya-maya
- New Village (Poblacion)
- Pelocuban
- Riverside (Poblacion)
- Sagrada Familia
- San Jose
- San Vicente
- Sumalig
- Tuluan
- Tungawan
- Upper Liaison
- Upper Lodiong
- Upper Tiparak

=== Climate ===
Climate data for Tambulig, Zamboanga del Sur
Month	Jan	Feb	Mar	Apr	May	Jun	Jul	Aug	Sep	Oct	Nov	Dec	Year
Mean daily maximum °C (°F)	29 (84)	30 (86)	30 (86)	31 (88)	30 (86)	30 (86)	29 (84)	30 (86)	30 (86)	30 (86)	30 (86)	29 (84)	30 (86)
Mean daily minimum °C (°F)	22 (72)	22 (72)	22 (72)	23 (73)	24 (75)	24 (75)	24 (75)	24 (75)	24 (75)	24 (75)	23 (73)	23 (73)	23 (74)
Average precipitation mm (inches)	69 (2.7)	58 (2.3)	67 (2.6)	60 (2.4)	109 (4.3)	114 (4.5)	83 (3.3)	78 (3.1)	76 (3.0)	92 (3.6)	86 (3.4)	63 (2.5)	955 (37.7)
Average rainy days	12.8	11.6	14.8	17.4	24.8	23.5	20.7	18.5	17.4	22.5	21.6	15.6	221.2
Source: Meteoblue

== Demographics ==
Population census of Tambulig
Year	Pop.	±% p.a.
1960	18,165	—
1970	19,140	+0.52%
1975	22,041	+2.87%
1980	17,740	−4.25%
1990	27,796	+4.59%
1995	29,147	+0.89%
2000	31,399	+1.61%
2007	34,242	+1.20%
2010	34,883	+0.68%
2015	36,160	+0.69%
2020	37,480	+0.76%
2024	37,400	−0.05%
Source: Philippine Statistics Authority

== Economy ==
Poverty incidence of Tambulig (%)

Source: Philippine Statistics Authority
