= Ramon Magsaysay, Zamboanga del Sur =

Municipality in Zamboanga del Sur, Philippines

Ramon Magsaysay Liargao
- Municipality
- Municipality of Ramon Magsaysay
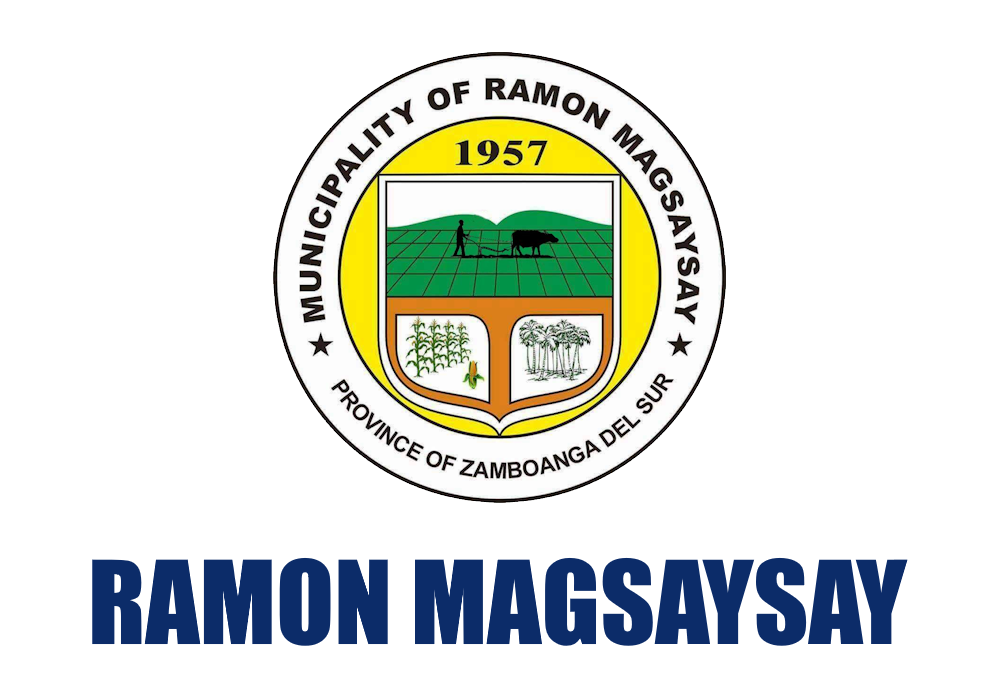
- Flag Seal

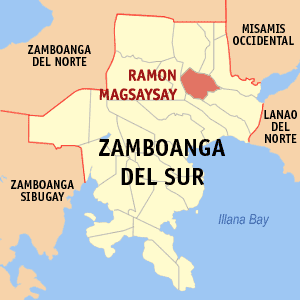
- Map of Zamboanga del Sur with Ramon Magsaysay highlighted
- Interactive map of Ramon Magsaysay
- Location within the Philippines
- Coordinates: 8°00′19″N 123°29′13″E
- Country: Philippines
- Region: Zamboanga Peninsula
- Province: Zamboanga del Sur
- District: 1st district
- Founded: February 13, 1957
- Named for: Ramon Magsaysay
- Barangays: 27 (see Barangays)

Government
  - Type: Sangguniang Bayan
  - Mayor: Margie A. Machon
  - Vice Mayor: Leonila D. Borinaga Sr.
  - Representative: Divina Grace C. Yu
  - Municipal Council: Members: Verginita A. Gonzales; John Paul C. Hontiveros; Necaster N. Javier; Chandel Ray N. Entienza; Lolito O. Arias; Anselmo D. Sacasan Jr.; Nieves A. Cabasag; Celso C. Cuyos
  - Electorate: 18,056 voters (2025)

Area
  - Total: 113.70 km^{2} (43.90 sq mi)
- Elevation: 174 m (571 ft)
- Highest elevation: 468 m (1,535 ft)
- Lowest elevation: 8 m (26 ft)

Population (2024 census)
  - Total: 28,419
  - Density: 249.95/km^{2} (647.36/sq mi)
  - Households: 6,588

Economy
  - Income class: 3rd municipal income class
  - Poverty incidence: 33.04% (2023)
  - Revenue: ₱ 179.5 million (2024)
  - Assets: ₱ 575.1 million (2024)
  - Expenditure: ₱ 37.95 million (2024)
  - Liabilities: ₱ 113 million (2024)

Service provider
  - Electricity: Zamboanga del Sur 1 Electric Cooperative (ZAMSURECO 1)
- Time zone: UTC+8 (PST)
- ZIP code: 7024
- PSGC: 0907323000
- IDD : area code: +63 (0)62
- Native languages: Subanon; Cebuano; Chavacano; Tagalog
- Website: www.zds-ramonmagsaysay.gov.ph

Ramon Magsaysay, officially the Municipality of Ramon Magsaysay (Cebuano: Lungsod sa Ramon Magsaysay; Subanen: Benwa Ramon Magsaysay; Chavacano: Municipalidad de Ramon Magsaysay; Tagalog: Bayan ng Ramon Magsaysay), is a municipality in the province of Zamboanga del Sur, Philippines. According to the 2024 census, it has a population of 28,419 people.

== History ==
The municipality was formed on February 13, 1957, out of 23 barrios of the Municipality of Aurora, and was originally called Liargao. It was renamed after Philippine president Ramon Magsaysay who created the municipality by virtue of Executive Order Number 239. Republic Act Number 2788 marked the renaming of Liargao to Ramon Magsaysay on June 19, 1960.

== Geography ==
=== Barangays ===
Ramon Magsaysay is politically subdivided into 27 barangays. Each barangay consists of puroks while some have sitios.

- Bag-ong Opon
- Bambong Daku
- Bambong Diut
- Bobongan
- Campo IV
- Campo V
- Caniangan
- Dipalusan
- Eastern Bobongan
- Esperanza
- Gapasan
- Katipunan
- Kauswagan
- Lower Sambulawan
- Mabini
- Magsaysay
- Malating
- Paradise
- Pasingkalan
- Poblacion
- San Fernando
- Santo Rosario
- Sapa Anding
- Sinaguing
- Switch
- Upper Laperian
- Wakat

=== Climate ===
Climate data for Ramon Magsaysay, Zamboanga del Sur
Month	Jan	Feb	Mar	Apr	May	Jun	Jul	Aug	Sep	Oct	Nov	Dec	Year
Mean daily maximum °C (°F)	29 (84)	29 (84)	30 (86)	30 (86)	29 (84)	28 (82)	28 (82)	28 (82)	28 (82)	28 (82)	29 (84)	29 (84)	29 (84)
Mean daily minimum °C (°F)	21 (70)	21 (70)	22 (72)	23 (73)	23 (73)	23 (73)	22 (72)	22 (72)	22 (72)	23 (73)	22 (72)	22 (72)	22 (72)
Average precipitation mm (inches)	48 (1.9)	44 (1.7)	56 (2.2)	56 (2.2)	112 (4.4)	135 (5.3)	124 (4.9)	124 (4.9)	115 (4.5)	134 (5.3)	90 (3.5)	56 (2.2)	1,094 (43)
Average rainy days	13.0	11.7	15.6	18.1	25.6	25.7	25.2	24.1	23.8	26.1	22.3	16.5	247.7
Source: Meteoblue

== Demographics ==
Population census of Ramon Magsaysay
Year	Pop.	±% p.a.
1960	24,282	—
1970	15,221	−4.56%
1975	18,057	+3.49%
1980	17,852	−0.23%
1990	21,065	+1.67%
1995	22,795	+1.49%
2000	23,323	+0.49%
2007	25,321	+1.14%
2010	26,194	+1.24%
2015	26,606	+0.30%
2020	27,280	+0.53%
2024	28,419	+0.99%
Source: Philippine Statistics Authority

== Economy ==
Poverty incidence of Ramon Magsaysay (%)

Source: Philippine Statistics Authority
