= Dumingag =

Municipality in Zamboanga del Sur, Philippines

- Municipality
- Municipality of Dumingag
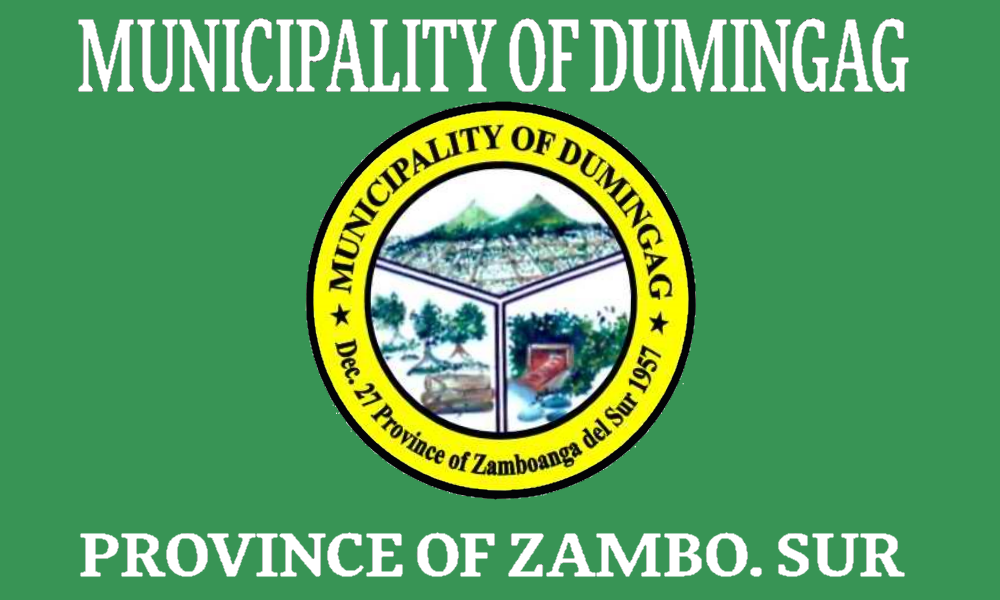
- Flag Seal

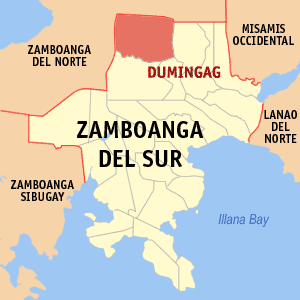
- Map of Zamboanga del Sur with Dumingag highlighted
- Interactive map of Dumingag
- Location within the Philippines
- Coordinates: 8°09′18″N 123°20′42″E
- Country: Philippines
- Region: Zamboanga Peninsula
- Province: Zamboanga del Sur
- District: 1st district
- Founded: December 27, 1957
- Barangays: 44 (see Barangays)

Government
  - Type: Sangguniang Bayan
  - Mayor: Gerry T. Paglinawan
  - Vice Mayor: Edgardo G. Jamero
  - Representative: Divina Grace C. Yu
  - Municipal Council: Members: Julius G. Jamero; Lars Christian C. Tangalin; Irish J. Mandao; Tracy E. Morpos; Paquito P. Duerme Jr.; Nilo B. Ledesma; Jenny T. Arbitrario; Francis Joeray T. Gumban
  - Electorate: 30,932 voters (2025)

Area
  - Total: 297.75 km^{2} (114.96 sq mi)
- Elevation: 118 m (387 ft)
- Highest elevation: 536 m (1,759 ft)
- Lowest elevation: 29 m (95 ft)

Population (2024 census)
  - Total: 48,495
  - Density: 162.87/km^{2} (421.84/sq mi)
  - Households: 11,334

Economy
  - Income class: 1st municipal income class
  - Poverty incidence: 42.32% (2023)
  - Revenue: ₱ 267.2 million (2024)
  - Assets: ₱ 724.5 million (2024)
  - Expenditure: ₱ 102.9 million (2024)
  - Liabilities: ₱ 155.2 million (2024)

Service provider
  - Electricity: Zamboanga del Sur 1 Electric Cooperative (ZAMSURECO 1)
- Time zone: UTC+8 (PST)
- ZIP code: 7028
- PSGC: 0907308000
- IDD : area code: +63 (0)62
- Native languages: Subanon; Cebuano; Chavacano; Tagalog
- Website: dumingag.gov.ph

Dumingag, officially the Municipality of Dumingag (Cebuano: Lungsod sa Dumingag; Subanen: Benwa Dumingag; Chavacano: Municipalidad de Dumingag; Tagalog: Bayan ng Dumingag), is a municipality in the province of Zamboanga del Sur, Philippines. According to the 2024 census, it has a population of 48,495 people.

== Etymology ==
Local stories said it is named after a noted Subanen chieftain, "Dumi" and his wife, "Ingag". Another supposed origin of the name tells about the native fellow who was asked by a government agent as to what the name of the place was while watching a cockfight. After the game was over, the stranger inquired about the name of the place. The native curtly replied: "Duminag!" meaning "I won". The government agent misheard the word. Instead of "Duminag", he wrote down "Dumingag".

The authenticity of these stories, however, is questionable since there has never been a single piece of evidence or record that Dumi and Ingag had ever actually existed. The first non-Subanen settlers of Dumingag were from the Ilo-ilo town of Dumangas the Decolongon Family who cultivated town center area. According to more convincing sources, the earliest settlers arrived in Dumingag with renewed optimism after World War II and, starting their lives anew, they hailed the place as "Little Dumangas". Hence, this soon developed into the current name "Dumingag".

== History ==
=== First inhabitants ===
The first inhabitants of Dumingag were the Subanens who initially came from the coastal areas of the province and the neighboring province of Misamis Occidental. The place is a vast expanse of jungle and marshland.

=== Establishment as a municipality ===
Originally, Dumingag was a barrio, and was part of the municipality of Molave. It was created in 1950 and the first barrio lieutenant back then was Jose Montuerto. On December 27, 1957, by virtue of Executive Order No. 283 issued by President Carlos P. Garcia, Dumingag finally became a municipality. Ever since it acquired its municipality status, a total of five people have handled the position of municipal mayor. They are Isidoro Y. Real, Sr (1957-1978), Julian C. Kho (1978-1986), Domeciano Y. Real (1986-1998), Edgardo J. Jamero (1998-2007), and Nacianceno M. Pacalioga, Jr. Of all the mayors who served the position, Isidro Y. Real, Sr. is widely considered to be the municipality's father and builder, him being the first mayor and the one who has served the longest.

=== Martial law era ===
The 1970s brought a period of numerous concurrent conflicts on the island of Mindanao, including Dumingag and Zamboanga del Sur. This included land dispute conflicts arising from the influx of settlers from Luzon and Visayas, and from the Marcos administration’s encouragement of militia groups such as the Ilaga. News of the 1968 Jabidah massacre ignited a furor in the Moro community, and ethnic tensions encouraged with the formation of secessionist movements. Additionally, an economic crisis in late 1969, violent crackdowns on student protests in 1970, and 1971, and eventually the declaration of Martial Law all led to the radicalization of many students. Many of them left schools in Manila and joined New People's Army units in their home provinces, bringing a Communist rebellion in the Philippines to Mindanao for the first time.

Dumingag became the site of a significant event during this period on February 12, 1982. Members of the Ilaga militia killed 12 persons in Dumingag, Zamboanga del Sur, allegedly to avenge the death of their leader, whom they believed had been killed by the NPA.

== Geography ==
Dumingag is the northernmost town of Zamboanga del Sur, and is located in the heartlands of the Zamboanga peninsula. It is north-west of the fertile Salug Valley and its land boundaries are the municipality of Sergio Osmeña, Sr. of Zamboanga del Norte in the north, the municipality of Mahayag in the east, the municipalities of Sominot and Midsalip in the south, and the municipality of Siayan in the west. Dumingag is classified as a 1st class municipality and, as of the 2020 census, has a population of about 48,881.

=== Barangays ===
Dumingang is politically subdivided into 44 barangays. Each barangay consists of puroks while some have sitios.

- Bag-ong Valencia
- Bag-ong Kauswagan
- Bag-ong Silangan
- Bucayan
- Calumanggi
- Canibongan
- Caridad
- Danlugan
- Dapiwak
- Datu Totocan
- Dilud
- Ditulan
- Dulian
- Dulop
- Guintananan
- Guitran
- Gumpingan
- La Fortuna
- Labangon
- Libertad
- Licabang
- Lipawan
- Lower Landing
- Lower Timonan
- Macasing
- Mahayahay
- Manlabay
- Malagalad
- Maralag
- Marangan
- New Basak
- Saad
- Salvador
- San Juan
- San Pablo (Poblacion)
- San Pedro (Poblacion)
- San Vicente
- Senote
- Sinonok
- Sunop
- Tagun
- Tamurayan
- Upper Landing
- Upper Timonan

=== Climate ===
Climate data for Dumingag, Zamboanga del Sur
Month	Jan	Feb	Mar	Apr	May	Jun	Jul	Aug	Sep	Oct	Nov	Dec	Year
Mean daily maximum °C (°F)	28 (82)	29 (84)	30 (86)	31 (88)	30 (86)	29 (84)	29 (84)	29 (84)	30 (86)	29 (84)	29 (84)	29 (84)	29 (85)
Mean daily minimum °C (°F)	23 (73)	23 (73)	23 (73)	23 (73)	24 (75)	24 (75)	24 (75)	24 (75)	24 (75)	24 (75)	24 (75)	23 (73)	24 (74)
Average precipitation mm (inches)	104 (4.1)	76 (3.0)	92 (3.6)	97 (3.8)	199 (7.8)	238 (9.4)	195 (7.7)	193 (7.6)	178 (7.0)	212 (8.3)	171 (6.7)	110 (4.3)	1,865 (73.3)
Average rainy days	14.7	12.5	15.8	17.5	27.6	28.5	29.0	27.5	26.9	27.9	23.5	18.2	269.6
Source: Meteoblue

== Demographics ==
Population census of Dumingag
Year	Pop.	±% p.a.
1960	23,713	—
1970	27,503	+1.49%
1975	29,521	+1.43%
1980	30,465	+0.63%
1990	33,514	+0.96%
1995	38,155	+2.46%
2000	42,203	+2.19%
2007	46,039	+1.21%
2010	46,500	+0.36%
2015	47,485	+0.40%
2020	48,881	+0.61%
2024	48,495	−0.19%
Source: Philippine Statistics Authority

== Economy ==
Poverty incidence of Dumingag (%)

Source: Philippine Statistics Authority
