= Legislative districts of Zamboanga del Sur =

The legislative districts of Zamboanga del Sur are the representations of the province of Zamboanga del Sur in the various national legislatures of the Philippines. The province is currently represented in the lower house of the Congress of the Philippines through its first and second congressional districts.

== History ==
Prior to gaining separate representation, areas now under the jurisdiction of Zamboanga del Sur were represented under the Department of Mindanao and Sulu (1917–1935) and the historical Zamboanga Province (1935–1953).

The enactment of Republic Act No. 711 on June 6, 1952 divided the old Zamboanga Province into Zamboanga del Norte and Zamboanga del Sur and provided them each with a congressional representative. Per Section 7 of Republic Act No. 711, the chartered cities of Zamboanga and Basilan formed part of Zamboanga del Sur's representation. The province, along with the two cities, first elected its representative starting in the 1953 elections. Even after receiving its own city charter on June 21, 1969, Pagadian remained part of the representation of the Province of Zamboanga del Sur by virtue of Section 108 of Republic Act No. 5478.

Zamboanga del Sur was represented in the Interim Batasang Pambansa as part of Region IX from 1978 to 1984. The province returned three representatives, elected at-large, to the Regular Batasang Pambansa in 1984. Basilan (established as a province in 1973) and Zamboanga City (classified as a highly urbanized city in 1983) separately elected their representatives starting that year.

Zamboanga del Sur was reapportioned into three congressional districts under the new Constitution which was proclaimed on February 11, 1987, and elected members to the restored House of Representatives starting that same year.

The passage of Republic Act No. 8973 and its subsequent ratification by plebiscite on February 22, 2001 separated Zamboanga del Sur's entire third district to create the new province of Zamboanga Sibugay. Per Section 7 of Republic Act No. 8973, Zamboanga del Sur's representation was reduced to two districts. The former third district first elected a representative under the designation Lone congressional district of Zamboanga Sibugay beginning in the 2001 election.

The now-defunct 3rd district automatically became the representation of Zamboanga Sibugay upon its establishment in February 2001, but it was in May 2001 that this new province first elected a representative under its own name.

== Current districts ==
Zamboanga del Sur's current congressional delegation is composed of two members.

Lakas–CMD (2)

Legislative districts and representatives of Zamboanga del Sur
District	Current Representative		Party	Constituent LGUs	Population (2020)	Area	Map
District	Image	Name	Party	Constituent LGUs	Population (2020)	Area	Map
1st		Joseph Yu (since 2025); Pagadian	Lakas–CMD	List: Aurora; Dumingag; Josefina; Labangan; Molave; Pagadian; Ramon Magsaysay; Sominot; Tambulig; Tukuran	630,154	2180.49 km²	
2nd		Victoria Yu (since 2022); Guipos	Lakas–CMD	List: Bayog; Dimataling; Dinas; Dumalinao; Guipos; Kumalarang; Lakewood; Lapuyan; Margosatubig; Pitogo; San Miguel; San Pablo; Tabina; Tigbao; Vincenzo Sagun	420,514	2318.97 km²	

== Historical districts ==
=== 3rd District (defunct) ===
- Municipalities: Alicia, Buug, Diplahan, Imelda, Ipil, Kabasalan, Mabuhay, Malangas, Naga, Olutanga, Payao, Roseller T. Lim, Siay, Talusan, Titay, Tungawan

Period	Representative
8th Congress; 1987–1992	Wilfredo G. Cainglet
9th Congress; 1992–1995	Belma A. Cabilao
10th Congress; 1995–1998	Belma A. Cabilao
11th Congress; 1998–2001	George T. Hofer

=== Lone District (defunct) ===
- includes Zamboanga City, and the present-day provinces of Basilan and Zamboanga Sibugay

Period	Representative
3rd Congress; 1953–1957	Roseller T. Lim (Note: Elected in 1955 to the Senate; seat remained vacant until the end of 3rd Congress.)
3rd Congress; 1953–1957	vacant
4th Congress; 1957–1961	Canuto M.S. Enerio
5th Congress; 1961–1965	Vincenzo Sagun
6th Congress; 1965–1969	Vincenzo Sagun
7th Congress; 1969–1972	Vicente M. Cerilles

=== At-Large (defunct) ===
- includes the present-day province of Zamboanga Sibugay

Period	Representatives
Regular Batasang Pambansa; 1984–1986	Vicente M. Cerilles
Regular Batasang Pambansa; 1984–1986	Bienvenido A. Ebarle
Regular Batasang Pambansa; 1984–1986	Alfredo Genaro C. Quintos

== See also ==
- Legislative district of Mindanao and Sulu
- Legislative district of Zamboanga
  - Legislative district of Basilan
  - Legislative districts of Zamboanga City
  - Legislative districts of Zamboanga Sibugay
