= Guipos =

Municipality in Zamboanga del Sur, Philippines

- Municipality
- Municipality of Guipos
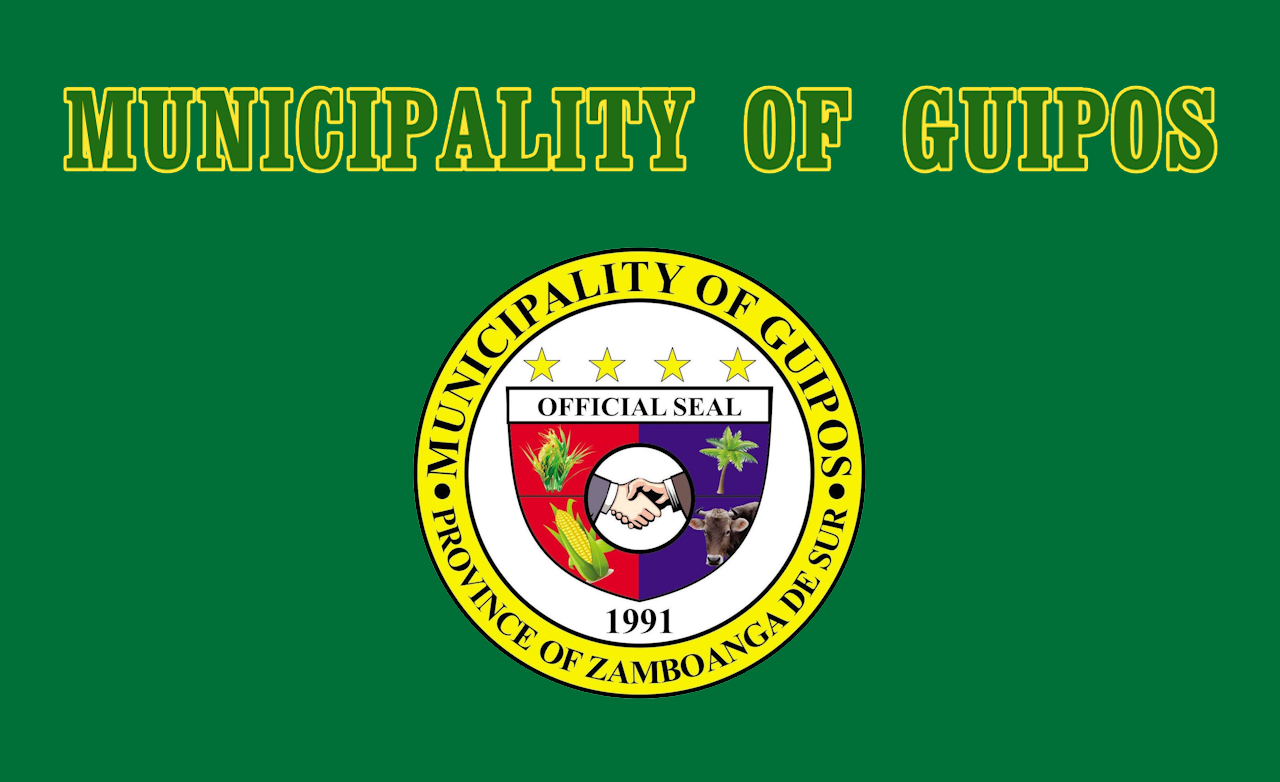
- Flag Seal

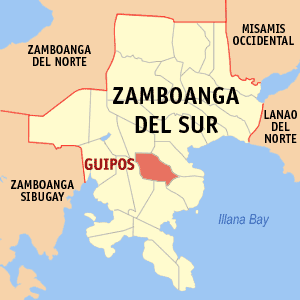
- Map of Zamboanga del Sur with Guipos highlighted
- Interactive map of Guipos
- Location within the Philippines
- Coordinates: 7°43′48″N 123°19′18″E
- Country: Philippines
- Region: Zamboanga Peninsula
- Province: Zamboanga del Sur
- District: 2nd district
- Founded: October 17, 1991
- Barangays: 17 (see Barangays)

Government
  - Type: Sangguniang Bayan
  - Mayor: Vicente P. Cajeta
  - Vice Mayor: Junevell O. Lamiing
  - Representative: Leonardo L. Babasa Jr.
  - Municipal Council: Members: Merlyn U. Rabe; Arnold T. Tagaloguin; Dionisio T. Alejay; Jerson R. Galinada; Elsie B. Ordoñez; Catalina D. Bala; Junner R. Revilleza; Earl Vincent P. Revelo
  - Electorate: 20,020 voters (2025)

Area
  - Total: 90.53 km^{2} (34.95 sq mi)
- Elevation: 207 m (679 ft)
- Highest elevation: 530 m (1,740 ft)
- Lowest elevation: 71 m (233 ft)

Population (2024 census)
  - Total: 22,173
  - Density: 244.9/km^{2} (634.4/sq mi)
  - Households: 5,080

Economy
  - Income class: 4th municipal income class
  - Poverty incidence: 30.19% (2023)
  - Revenue: ₱ 137.2 million (2024)
  - Assets: ₱ 327.7 million (2024)
  - Expenditure: ₱ 45.12 million (2024)
  - Liabilities: ₱ 116.6 million (2024)

Service provider
  - Electricity: Zamboanga del Sur 1 Electric Cooperative (ZAMSURECO 1)
- Time zone: UTC+8 (PST)
- ZIP code: 7042
- PSGC: 0907343000
- IDD : area code: +63 (0)62
- Native languages: Subanon; Cebuano; Chavacano; Tagalog

Guipos, officially the Municipality of Guipos (Cebuano: Lungsod sa Guipos; Subanen: Benwa Guipos; Chavacano: Municipalidad de Guipos; Tagalog: Bayan ng Guipos), is a municipality in the province of Zamboanga del Sur, Philippines. According to the 2024 census, it has a population of 22,173 people.

The town was officially established on October 7, 1991, by virtue of Republic Act No. 7159, signed by President Corazon C. Aquino. It was formed from barangays Guipos, Katipunan, Bagong Oroquieta, and Dalapang of the municipality of San Miguel; barangays Datagan, Dagohoy, Balongating, Baguitan, Magting, Sikatuna, Dacsol, Guling, and Canunan of the municipality of Dumalinao; barangays Lintum, Singclot and Litan of the municipality of Dinas; and barangay Regla of the municipality of San Pablo.

Through Presidential Proclamation 682, October 7, 2024 was declared a special non-working day in Guipos to commemorate the 33rd Araw ng Guipos.

== Geography ==
=== Barangays ===
Guipos is politically subdivided into 17 barangays. Each barangay consists of puroks while some have sitios.

- Bagong Oroquieta
- Baguitan
- Balongating
- Canunan
- Dacsol
- Dagohoy
- Dalapang
- Datagan
- Guling
- Katipunan
- Lintum
- Litan
- Magting
- Poblacion (Guipos)
- Regla
- Sikatuna
- Singclot

=== Climate ===
Climate data for Guipos, Zamboanga del Sur
Month	Jan	Feb	Mar	Apr	May	Jun	Jul	Aug	Sep	Oct	Nov	Dec	Year
Mean daily maximum °C (°F)	29 (84)	30 (86)	30 (86)	30 (86)	29 (84)	28 (82)	27 (81)	27 (81)	28 (82)	28 (82)	29 (84)	29 (84)	29 (84)
Mean daily minimum °C (°F)	20 (68)	20 (68)	21 (70)	22 (72)	23 (73)	23 (73)	22 (72)	22 (72)	22 (72)	22 (72)	22 (72)	20 (68)	22 (71)
Average precipitation mm (inches)	22 (0.9)	18 (0.7)	23 (0.9)	24 (0.9)	67 (2.6)	120 (4.7)	132 (5.2)	156 (6.1)	119 (4.7)	124 (4.9)	54 (2.1)	24 (0.9)	883 (34.6)
Average rainy days	9.4	9.1	11.5	11.9	20.1	22.5	22.4	23.2	21.5	22.2	15.7	11.5	201
Source: Meteoblue

== Demographics ==
Population census of Guipos
Year	Pop.	±% p.a.
1995	16,399	—
2000	18,172	+2.23%
2007	19,616	+1.06%
2010	19,771	+0.29%
2015	20,729	+0.91%
2020	21,738	+1.01%
2024	22,173	+0.48%
Source: Philippine Statistics Authority

== Economy ==
Poverty incidence of Guipos (%)

Source: Philippine Statistics Authority
