= Pitogo =

Pitogo may refer to one of several topics relating to the Philippines:

- Cycas edentata, a species of Cycas called "pitogo" in the Philippines
- Pitogo, Quezon
- Pitogo, Zamboanga del Sur
- Pitogo, Taguig
- President Carlos P. Garcia, Bohol, formerly known as Pitogo
