= Bayog =

Municipality in Zamboanga del Sur, Philippines

- Municipality
- Municipality of Bayog
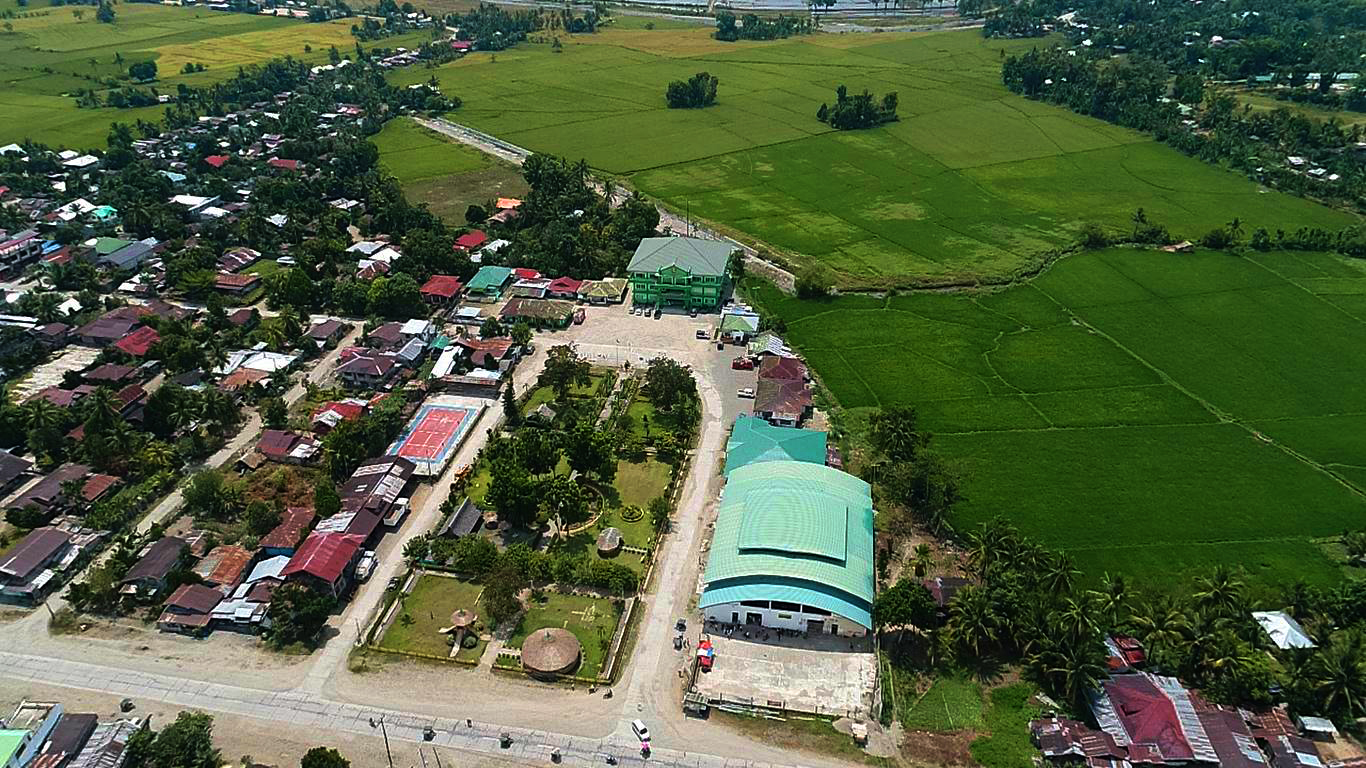
- Aerial view

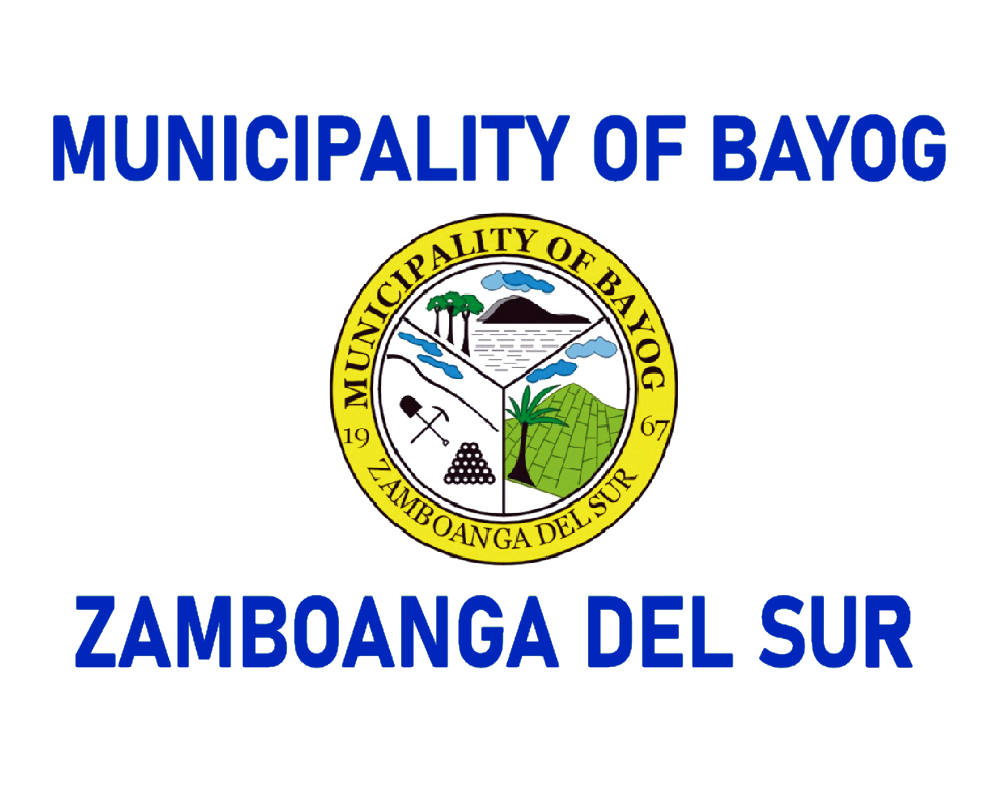
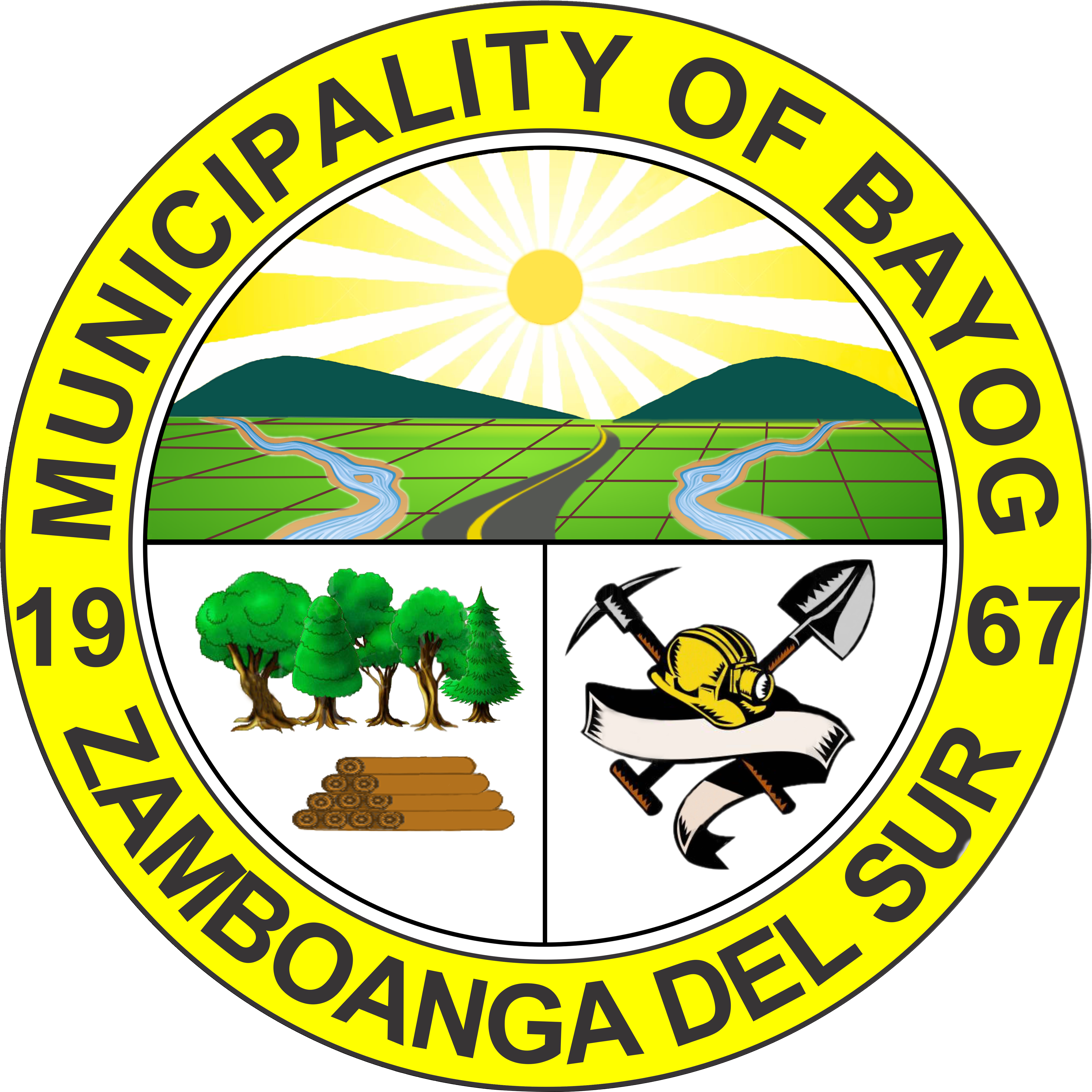
- Flag Seal

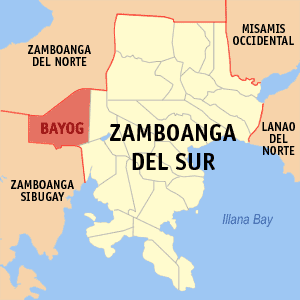
- Map of Zamboanga del Sur with Bayog highlighted
- Interactive map of Bayog
- Location within the Philippines
- Coordinates: 7°50′51″N 123°02′32″E
- Country: Philippines
- Region: Zamboanga Peninsula
- Province: Zamboanga del Sur
- District: 2nd district
- Founded: May 8, 1967
- Barangays: 28 (see Barangays)

Government
  - Type: Sangguniang Bayan
  - Mayor: Celso A. Matias
  - Vice Mayor: Jocel L. Babasa
  - Representative: Leonardo L. Babasa Jr.
  - Municipal Council: Members: Horace Paul T. Anlap; Junel P. Bacbac; Berly E. Jate; Ernesto C. Yagos; Norelyn B. Rodriguez; Cerilo B. Carcueva; Ronilo A. Yamaro; Godofredo T. Compacion
  - Electorate: 21,967 voters (2025)

Area
  - Total: 356.40 km^{2} (137.61 sq mi)
- Elevation: 152 m (499 ft)
- Highest elevation: 578 m (1,896 ft)
- Lowest elevation: 27 m (89 ft)

Population (2024 census)
  - Total: 32,687
  - Density: 91.714/km^{2} (237.54/sq mi)
  - Households: 7,633

Economy
  - Income class: 1st municipal income class
  - Poverty incidence: 43.1% (2023)
  - Revenue: ₱ 278.1 million (2024)
  - Assets: ₱ 574.2 million (2024)
  - Expenditure: ₱ 284.8 million (2024)
  - Liabilities: ₱ 167.6 million (2024)

Service provider
  - Electricity: Zamboanga del Sur 2 Electric Cooperative (ZAMSURECO 2)
- Time zone: UTC+8 (PST)
- ZIP code: 7011
- PSGC: 0907303000
- IDD : area code: +63 (0)62
- Native languages: Subanon; Cebuano; Chavacano; Tagalog
- Website: www.zds-bayog.gov.ph

Bayog, officially the Municipality of Bayog (Cebuano: Lungsod sa Bayog; Subanen: Benwa Bayog; Chavacano: Municipalidad de Bayog; Tagalog: Bayan ng Bayog), is a municipality in the province of Zamboanga del Sur, Philippines. According to the 2024 census, it has a population of 32,687 people.

== History ==
In 1953, large numbers of immigrants started settling permanently in this area which was then sparsely populated by the native Subanen. Barrio Bayog came into existence under the Municipality of Malangas. Bayog was adopted as the name of the barrio, as this place was known to the natives due to the abundance of the “Bayog” (pterospermum diversifolium) trees in the area.

Opportunities in agriculture, business and employment attracted more settlers into the area, particularly during the year 1957 and 1958. The influx of settlers was given more impetus when the Samar Mining Company (SAMICO) constructed the existing 42 kilometres (26 mi) SAMICO road from Bobuan to its wharf in Pamintayan. By 1959, Bayog was already quite big for a barrio. So another barrio was created which is now the present barangay Kahayagan. When the municipality of Buug (also a former barrio of Malangas) was created in 1960, barangay Bayog and Kahayagan were among the barrios under it.

As early as 1963, three years after the SAMICO road was completed and the company was in full-blast operation, the population of Bayog already warranted the creation of a new municipality. Thus, on November 14, 1964, Bayog started to function as a corporate municipality separate and distinct from the Municipality of Buug by virtue of Executive Order No. 112 issued by the then President Diosdado Macapagal. However, on February 15, 1966, the infant municipality was dissolved and reverted into its former status as one of the barangays of the Municipality of Buug by virtue of a Supreme Court decision in the case of Pelaez vs. Auditor General. The then Senator Pealez contented that the creation of a new municipality through an executive Order was against the law as the same was a prerogative of Congress.

In time, the town re-applied as a candidate for municipality. The Municipality of Bayog became the 29th municipality of the Province of Zamboanga del Sur on May 8, 1967, by virtue of Republic Act No. 4872, authorized by then Congressman Vincenso Sagun. The new municipality was formed out of twenty barrios of the Municipality of Buug (at that time still Province of Zamboanga del Sur): Bayog (which became the poblacion), Bobuan, Datagan, Pulangbato, Dipili, Salawagan, Lamari, Damit, Depasi, Pangi (now San Isidro), Liba, Datagan I, Datagan II, Mataga, Dimalinao, Baking, Dipuri, Kwai, Maton-og and Kanipa-an. During the later part of the year, barangays Supon, Canoayan, Dagum, Camp Blessing, Conakon, Matin-ao, Balukbahan, Sigacad, Deporehan, Bantal and Balunbunan were created by virtue of a Provincial Board Resolution. To date, the Municipality has twenty-eight (28) barangays within its juridical boundaries.

== Geography ==
Bayog is the only town in Zamboanga del Sur that borders the provinces of Zamboanga del Norte and Zamboanga Sibugay. It is bounded on the north by Godod, Bacungan, Sindangan, and Siayan; on the east by Lakewood; on the south by Kumalarang, Buug, and Diplahan; and on the west by Kabasalan. It is the westernmost town in the province.

The town is partly situated in the Sibougey Valley watered by the Sibuguey River, Dipili River, and Depore River. 75% of the land lies on rugged terrain with elevation up to 300 metres (980 ft).

=== Climate ===
Climate data for Bayog, Zamboanga del Sur
Month	Jan	Feb	Mar	Apr	May	Jun	Jul	Aug	Sep	Oct	Nov	Dec	Year
Mean daily maximum °C (°F)	30 (86)	30 (86)	31 (88)	31 (88)	30 (86)	29 (84)	29 (84)	29 (84)	29 (84)	29 (84)	30 (86)	30 (86)	30 (86)
Mean daily minimum °C (°F)	22 (72)	22 (72)	23 (73)	24 (75)	24 (75)	24 (75)	23 (73)	23 (73)	23 (73)	24 (75)	23 (73)	23 (73)	23 (74)
Average precipitation mm (inches)	48 (1.9)	44 (1.7)	56 (2.2)	56 (2.2)	112 (4.4)	135 (5.3)	124 (4.9)	124 (4.9)	115 (4.5)	134 (5.3)	90 (3.5)	56 (2.2)	1,094 (43)
Average rainy days	13.0	11.7	15.6	18.1	25.6	25.7	25.2	24.1	23.8	26.1	22.3	16.5	247.7
Source: Meteoblue

=== Barangays ===
Bayog is politically subdivided into 28 barangays. Each barangay consists of puroks while some have sitios.

- Baking
- Balukbahan
- Balumbunan
- Bantal
- Bobuan
- Camp Blessing
- Canoayan
- Conacon
- Dagum
- Damit
- Datagan
- Depase
- Dipili
- Depore
- Deporehan
- Dimalinao
- Kahayagan
- Kanipaan
- Lamare
- Liba
- Matin-ao
- Matun-og
- San Isidro (Pangi)
- Poblacion
- Pulang Bato
- Salawagan
- Sigacad
- Supon

== Demographics ==
Population census of Bayog
Year	Pop.	±% p.a.
1970	13,599	—
1975	15,784	+3.03%
1980	16,782	+1.23%
1990	22,092	+2.79%
1995	25,231	+2.52%
2000	26,248	+0.85%
2007	28,707	+1.24%
2010	30,048	+1.68%
2015	33,591	+2.15%
2020	34,519	+0.58%
2024	32,687	−1.30%
Source: Philippine Statistics Authority

== Economy ==
Poverty incidence of Bayog (%)

Source: Philippine Statistics Authority

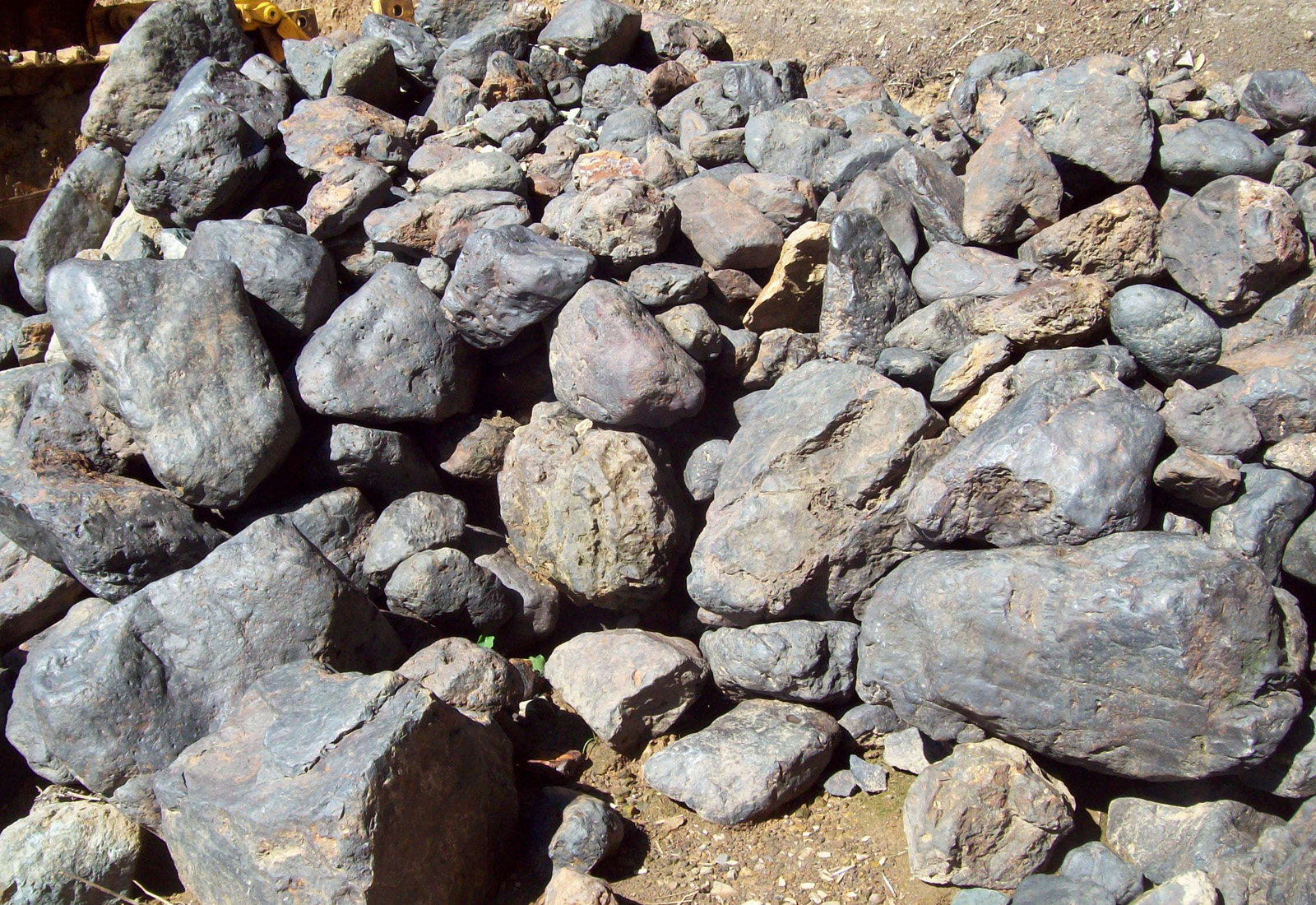
Iron ore from Bayog

Bayog has one of the most bustling economies in the province, since it is one of the top revenue-producing municipalities in Zamboanga del Sur, with an annual income of over 25,000,000 which come mainly from mining, business establishments, and quarrying.

As of now, there is one financial institution which operates in the town and numerous cooperatives which also contribute to the town's overall income. Two pawnshops have also started operations in the town - the Mlhuiller Pawnshop and the Bayog Pawnshop.

Since Bayog is mainly agricultural, over 20 rice and corn mills can be found in the municipality. In addition, their products are also traded with neighbouring cities such as Zamboanga City and Pagadian City, which is why Bayog has also been considered as th "Rice Granary Of Region IX". The people of the town rely mainly on crop raising and animal husbandry. The town is situated in a wide plain fed by the Siboguey River and its tributaries. Two dams can be found in the municipality, namely, the Sibouguey Irrigation Dam and the Dipili River Irrigation Dam, which are responsible for irrigating some 100 square kilometres of ricefields. This dams were erected during the late 1970s with support from the Philippine-Australian Development Project. The dams are now under the management of the National Irrigation Administration through their office in the town center.

Bayog has also been cited as the Livestock Center of the region because of the Western Mindanao Livestock Development Center in Barangay Kahayagan, which is responsible for the improvement of livestock products in Zamboanga Peninsula through right breedings.

The people have also been engaged in logging due to the vast forest which were found in the area. In the past, Bayog was also referred as the Timbermines Country.

Mining is a major industry in Bayog. Gold is concentrated in Barangay Depore while copper, lead and steel are mined in Barangay Bubuan and Barangay Liba. Several companies have already started their explorations here, i.e. Toronto Ventures Incorporated (TVI), Cebu Ore Mining Inc, Miki Trio Ore Mining Inc., and some small scale miners which have their own organization, the Monte de Oro Small Scale Mining Association (MOSSMA).

=== Public market ===
The new Public Market Building has 180 stalls occupied by different business groups. The Fish and Meat section has 40 stalls, fruit stand & old carenderia has 15 stalls, Dry Goods section 15 stalls, and new Carenderia building with 7 stalls. As of now there were already 6 stalls in the newly constructed night market. A new phase of the Public Market is under construction and will add new 25 stalls.

== Tourism ==
Bayog has a gymnasium with a seating capacity of 4500, considered as one of the largest in the province. Three other gymnasiums in the town are also used in handling large crowds, the Kahayagan Gymnasium, BCES Gymnasium and the BNHS Gymnasium. There are also four tennis courts ( BALTEC, NIA, Kahayagan Sports Complex, WESMILDEC), maintained by the Bayog Lawn Tennis Club. Another local facility is the Bayog Municipal Plaza.

- The Dipili River - a tributary of the Sibuguey River and was awarded as the cleanest river in the Philippines.
- Western Mindanao Livestock Development Center - known for its buildings and guests house. It is situated in a hill which overlooks the town.
- Loading Point - an irrigation system that serves as haven for the young people during weekends.
- Supon Dam - a dam which is also an attraction
- Bailey Bridge - a 55-meter modular bridge crossing the Sibuguey River.
- Escalante Caves - located in Barangay Lamare. Featured more or less 60 caves in just one setting.
- Buko Falls - located in barangay Kahayagan.
- Lupisan Falls - located in Barangay Datagan.
- Balumbonan Cave - located in barangay Balumbonan.

Every summer, the town was always been the venue of different religious gatherings, including the Regional Youth Camp which is hosted by the Liberty Bible Baptist Church and draws approximately 600 youths from all over the region and several participants from Cebu, Lanao del Norte, and Misamis Occidental. Another is the GAYEM, hosted by the Seventh-Day Adventist Church and held participants from the Provinces of Zamboanga del Sur and Zamboanga Sibugay.

== Culture ==
=== Fiestas and festivals ===
Festival dates in Bayog include the following:

- 3rd Week of January for the Sinulog sa Kahayagan which features carnivals and street dancings in honor of Sr. Santo Niño.
- May 8–10 for the celebration of the Araw ng Bayog.
- May 8 for the Tribal Festival which features pageantry between the different tribes which resides in Bayog.
- May 9 for the Buklog Festival, a Subanen fertility ritual.
- September 17 for the celebration of the Araw ng Zamboanga del Sur.
- 3rd Week of November for the Feast of Saint Joseph the Worker.

== Infrastructure ==
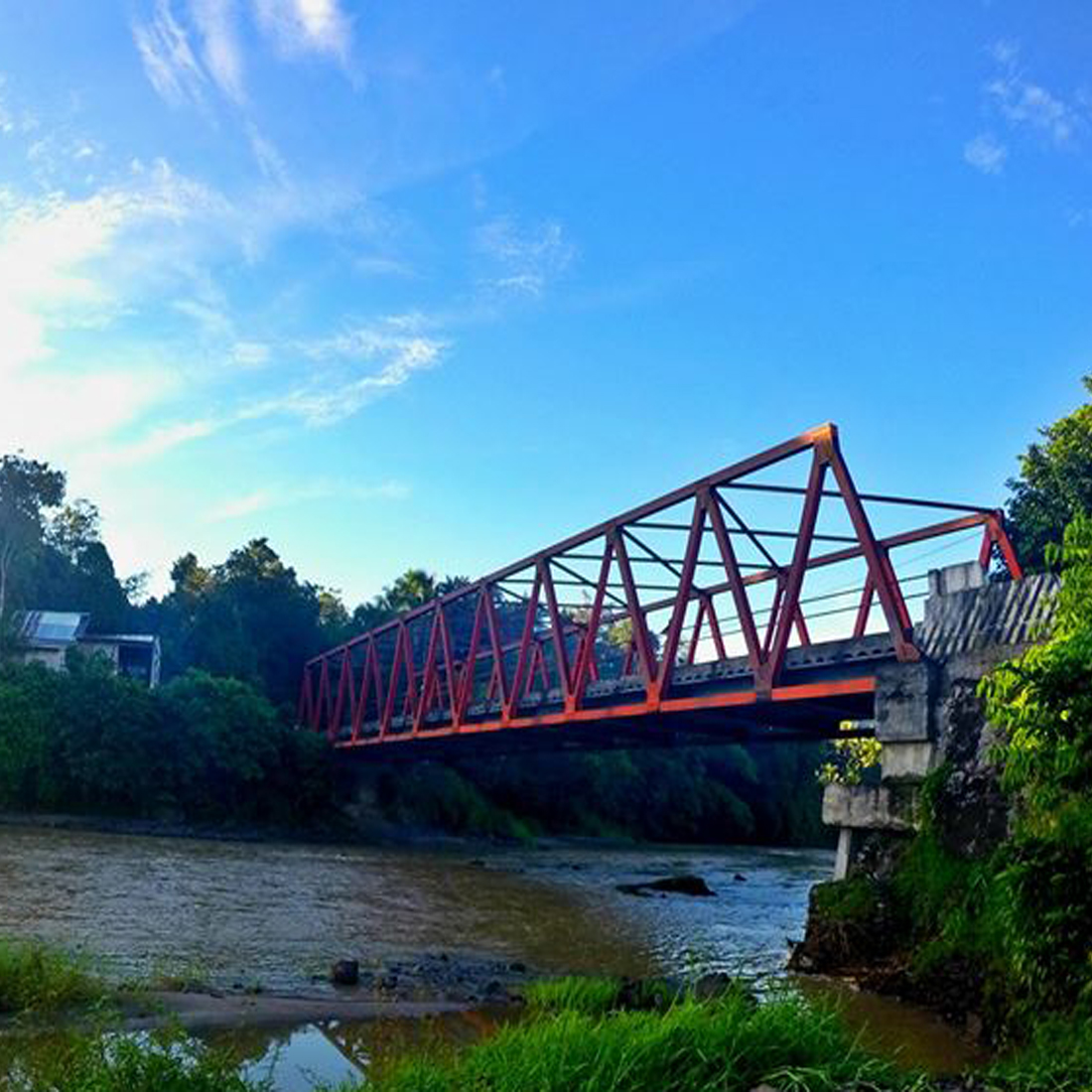
Bailey Bridge, a 55-meter modular bridge which crosses the Sibuguey River

=== Roads ===
The total road network of the municipality is 195.42 kilometres (121.43 mi), of which 7.56 kilometres (4.70 mi) are concrete, 133.34 kilometres (82.85 mi) are gravel and 54.52 kilometres (33.88 mi) are dirt roads.

=== Transport facilities ===
Municipal records show that there are 134 registered tricycles/Habal-Habal as of December 2005. There are 50 privately owned vehicles in the municipality. There are also passenger buses and jeepneys plying Bayog to Buug, Bayog-Pagadian routes. To date, there are two buses plying Bayog-Zamboanga Route.

Out of the twenty eight barangays, only two barangays are not accessible by vehicles due to the very poor conditions of their farm to market roads. Residents utilized horses or carabaos to transport their farm products up to the point where transportation is accessible.

=== Bridges ===
The municipality of Bayog has nine (9) Tulay ng Pangulo projects constructed at Barangays Dipili, Depase, Balunbunan, Depase, Canoayan, Lamare, Bobuan, Depore and Poblacion.

=== Utilities ===
Power
The electric power of the municipality is supplied by the Zamboanga del Sur Electric Cooperative II (ZAMSURECO II) through its substation in the municipality of Buug, Zamboanga Sibugay. The municipality has 28 barangays that all are now energized.

Water
The local government unit of Bayog has its level III water system that supplies the need of the people in the Poblacion & Kahayagan. The types of water system used in the different barangays are classified into Level 1 (shallow well, deep well & spring) Level II (spring development with communal faucets), and Level III (with individual households connections).

== Government ==
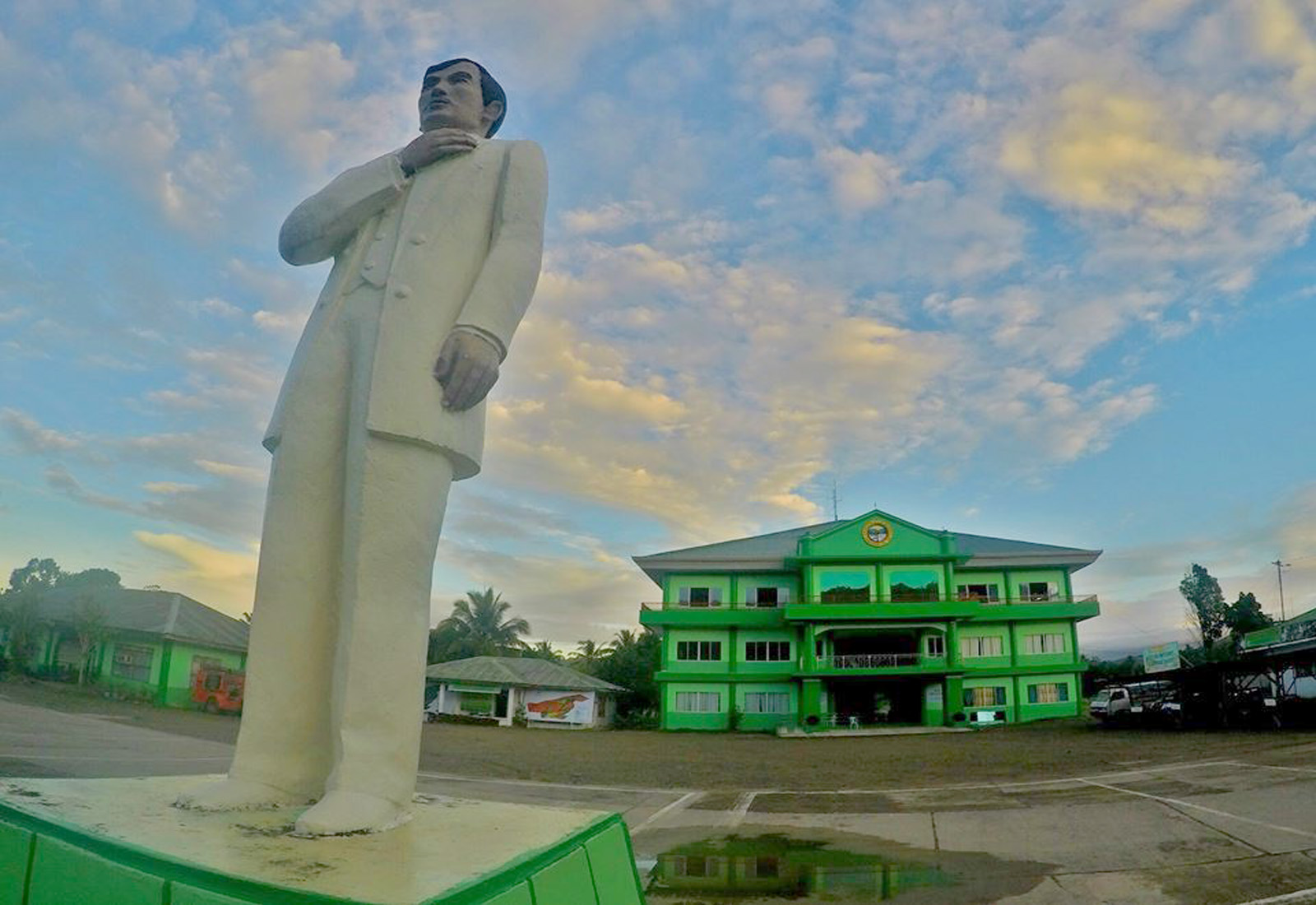
Bayog Municipal Government Center

The municipal compound is located in the heart of the town. The charred municipal building is in the center, looking over Bayog Municipal Plaza, which featured a Children's Park; a twin fountain which has the town's map drawn on it; a flower field, a priority project of the recent administration; a statue of the National Hero; the famous 30 flagpoles, and the Bayog Trees, which is believed to be the burial site of a Subanen Datu which was considered as the first town's settler.

On its right side, resides the Philippine National Police Headquarters, the Bayog Lawn Tennis Association Court, the Municipal Canteen, the Municipal Motorpool, the SIVAFA Midwife Clinic, and the AFUZS Headquarters.

While on its left sides, stand the ABC Multi-purpose Building, the DILG Office, a session hall, the Bayog Municipal Health Center, and the 3500-seater Municipal Gymnasium.

Along the side of the Municipal Hall, there you can find the Senior Citizen House, the post office, the Office of the Agriculturist, the Department of Transportation and Communication, the Department of Environment and Natural Resources, Department of Social Welfare and Development, the Municipal Day Care Center, the Newly constructed E-Center and the Municipal Swimming Pool.

At its back is the Municipal Nursery, and the Municipal Guest House.

=== List of former chief executives ===
Mayor	Vice Mayor	Tenure
Juan Tagabuen	Antonio Ejudo	1967
Dominador Salomon	Alfonso Carballo	1967–1971
Valentin Cercado	Felipe Dulatre	1971–1975
Valentin Cercado	Felipe Dulatre	1971–1980
Valentin Cercado	Emercindo Fullo	1980–1986
Dominador Salomon	Frank Mabulay	1986–1987
Constantino Belza	Lydia Lucero	1987–1988
Emercindo Fullo	Melody Belza	1988–1992
Melody L. Belza	Nerrisa Lucero	1992–1995
Melody L. Belza	Frank Mabulay	1995–1998
Melody L. Belza	Baltazar Caberte	1998–2001
Mary Ann E. Lucero - Cartalla	Severo Opay	2001–2004
Mary Ann E. Lucero - Cartalla	Pedro Anlap	2004–2007
Mary Ann E. Lucero - Cartalla	Pedro Anlap	2007–2010
Leonardo L. Babasa, Jr.	Romualdo S. Godin	2010-2013
Leonardo L. Babasa, Jr.	Celso A. Matias	2013-2016
Leonardo L. Babasa, Jr.	Celso A. Matias	2016-2019
Celso A. Matias	Jocel L. Babasa	2019 - 2022
Celso A. Matias	Jocel L. Babasa	2022 - 2025

== Education ==
The town has a college, the Josefina H. Cerilles State College which caters the educational needs of the entire populace and of the neighboring towns. It offers cheap education to the townfolks. It has replaced the External Studies Unit of Western Mindanao State University, which for seven years have served the municipality of Bayog and provided the Bayoganos access to higher learning. Bayog has also four secondary schools, of which Bayog National High School is the most prominent. There are 33 elementary schools in this town, of which one is a private institution, the Siboguey SDA Elementary School owned by the Seventh-day Adventist Church. All of the public schools here are networked through an office situated at the Central School.

== Sister cities ==
- (Philippines) Makati
