= Vincenzo A. Sagun, Zamboanga del Sur =

Municipality in Zamboanga del Sur, Philippines

Vincenzo A. Sagun Kabatan
- Municipality
- Municipality of Vincenzo A. Sagun
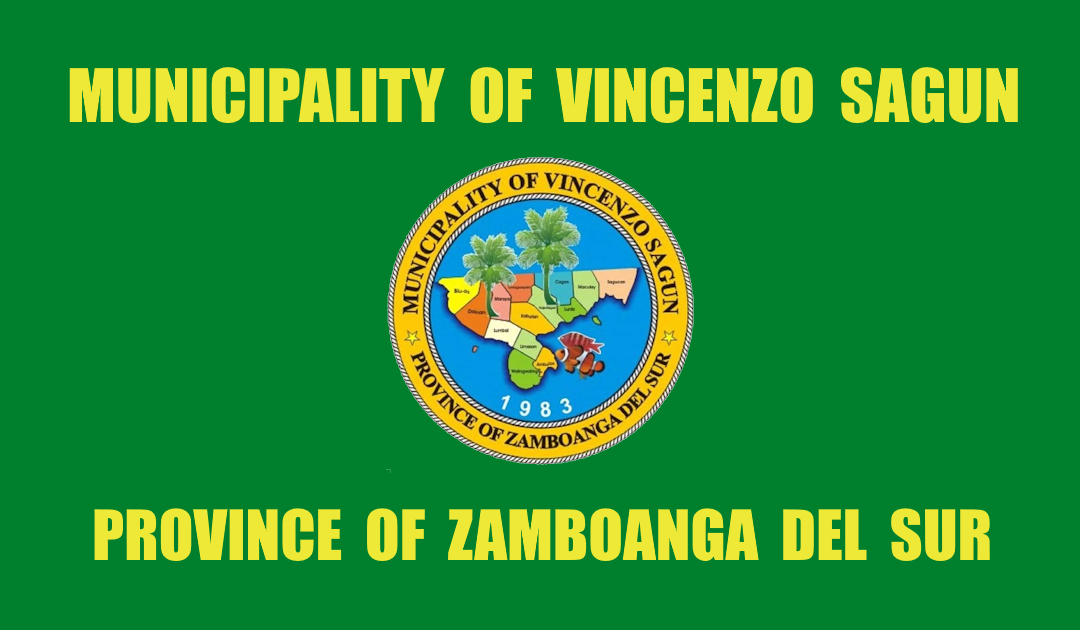
- Flag Seal
- Nickname: Sagun
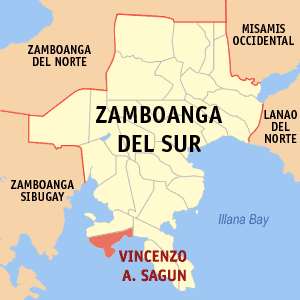
- Map of Zamboanga del Sur with Vincenzo A. Sagun highlighted
- Interactive map of Vincenzo A. Sagun
- Location within the Philippines
- Coordinates: 7°30′53″N 123°10′15″E
- Country: Philippines
- Region: Zamboanga Peninsula
- Province: Zamboanga del Sur
- District: 2nd district
- Founded: 17 May 1982
- Named for: Vincenzo Sagun
- Barangays: 14 (see Barangays)

Government
  - Type: Sangguniang Bayan
  - Mayor: Jeffry P. Maata
  - Vice Mayor: Noel D. Reales
  - Representative: Jeyzel Victoria C. Yu
  - Municipal Council: Members: Merlinda P. Maata; John Ford C. Tornandizo; Nestor Dolar; Reynaldo Tago; Janie S. Rivera; Estanislao Elago; Junafer Oral; Maria Teresa Pailden
  - Electorate: 16,121 voters (2025)

Area
  - Total: 63.00 km^{2} (24.32 sq mi)
- Elevation: 102 m (335 ft)
- Highest elevation: 421 m (1,381 ft)
- Lowest elevation: 0 m (0 ft)

Population (2024 census)
  - Total: 22,619
  - Density: 359.0/km^{2} (929.9/sq mi)
  - Households: 5,791

Economy
  - Income class: 4th municipal income class
  - Poverty incidence: 38.9% (2023)
  - Revenue: ₱ 134 million (2024)
  - Assets: ₱ 436.7 million (2024)
  - Expenditure: ₱ 43.31 million (2024)
  - Liabilities: ₱ 157.7 million (2024)

Service provider
  - Electricity: Zamboanga del Sur 1 Electric Cooperative (ZAMSURECO 1)
- Time zone: UTC+8 (PST)
- ZIP code: 7036
- PSGC: 0907341000
- IDD : area code: +63 (0)62
- Native languages: Subanon; Cebuano; Chavacano; Tagalog
- Website: zds-vsagun.gov.ph

Vincenzo A. Sagun, officially the Municipality of Vincenzo A. Sagun (Cebuano: Lungsod sa Vincenzo A. Sagun; Subanen: Benwa Vincenzo A. Sagun; Chavacano: Municipalidad de Vincenzo A. Sagun; Tagalog: Bayan ng Vincenzo A. Sagun), is a municipality in the province of Zamboanga del Sur, Philippines. According to the 2024 census, it has a population of 22,619 people.

The municipality is named after Zamboanga del Sur Governor and Representative Vincenzo Sagun.

== History ==
The municipality was created as Vincenzo Sagun through Batas Pambansa Blg. 173 which was approved on February 8, 1982; thirteen barangays in Margosatubig had been separated with Cabatan designated the seat of government. A plebiscite for ratification, along with ten more newly-created local entities including Roseller Lim (now in Zamboanga Sibugay), was held on May 17, coinciding with the barangay elections.

Government expenses was minimized relative to this political exercise. Majority of the electorate of the affected barangays voted in favor of the creation of the municipality.

== Geography ==
Vicenzo A. Sagun is a coastal municipality that is found in the southern section of Zamboanga del Sur. It is in the Baganian Peninsula, some 60 kilometers northwest of the province's capital of Pagadian City. As for its boundaries, the municipality of Margosatubig can be found on the north, while the south is occupied by Maligay Bay and Dumanquilas Bay, on the southeast and the southwest, respectively. The municipality of Dimataling cradles it on the east. The total area of Vincenzo A. Sagun makes up 8.15% of Zamboanga del Sur's area, and .041% of the whole Zamboanga Peninsula Region.

Of the 14 barangays that Vincenzo Sagun has, 11 of them are coastal, and most of the inhabitants are fisherfolk by trade and livelihood. The municipality is noted for its rich marine resources, with some parts being groomed to be prime tourist aquatic spot. One of the Vincenzo Sagun's featured products are the dried fish which are usually exported to the other provinces.

=== Climate ===
Climate data for Vincenzo A. Sagun, Zamboanga del Sur
| Month | Jan | Feb | Mar | Apr | May | Jun | Jul | Aug | Sep | Oct | Nov | Dec | Year |
|---|---|---|---|---|---|---|---|---|---|---|---|---|---|
| Mean daily maximum °C (°F) | 30 (86) | 31 (88) | 32 (90) | 32 (90) | 30 (86) | 29 (84) | 28 (82) | 28 (82) | 29 (84) | 29 (84) | 30 (86) | 30 (86) | 30 (86) |
| Mean daily minimum °C (°F) | 21 (70) | 21 (70) | 22 (72) | 23 (73) | 24 (75) | 24 (75) | 23 (73) | 23 (73) | 23 (73) | 23 (73) | 23 (73) | 21 (70) | 23 (73) |
| Average precipitation mm (inches) | 22 (0.9) | 18 (0.7) | 23 (0.9) | 24 (0.9) | 67 (2.6) | 120 (4.7) | 132 (5.2) | 156 (6.1) | 119 (4.7) | 124 (4.9) | 54 (2.1) | 24 (0.9) | 883 (34.6) |
| Average rainy days | 9.4 | 9.1 | 11.5 | 11.9 | 20.1 | 22.5 | 22.4 | 23.2 | 21.5 | 22.2 | 15.7 | 11.5 | 201 |
Source: Meteoblue

=== Barangays ===
Vincenzo A. Sagun is politically subdivided into 14 barangays. Each barangay consists of puroks while some have sitios.

- Ambulon
- Biu-os
- Cogon
- Danan
- Kabatan (Poblacion)
- Kapatagan
- Limason
- Linoguayan
- Lumbal
- Lunib
- Maculay
- Maraya
- Sagucan
- Walingwaling

Sitios:

- Liangan, Kabatan
- Lote, Limason
- Borbon, Kapatagan
- Sumbaga, Walingwaling
- Kabuling, Danan

== Demographics ==
Population census of Vincenzo A. Sagun
| Year | Pop. | ±% p.a. |
|---|---|---|
| 1990 | 17,294 | — |
| 1995 | 17,410 | +0.13% |
| 2000 | 19,072 | +1.97% |
| 2007 | 19,984 | +0.65% |
| 2010 | 20,583 | +1.08% |
| 2015 | 23,759 | +2.77% |
| 2020 | 24,852 | +0.95% |
| 2024 | 22,619 | −2.23% |
Source: Philippine Statistics Authority

== Economy ==
Poverty incidence of Vincenzo A. Sagun (%)

Source: Philippine Statistics Authority

== Education ==
=== College ===
- Zamboanga Del Sur Provincial Government College—Vincenzo Sagun Campus

=== High schools ===
- Cogon National High School
- Judge Edmundo S. Pinga National High School
- Kabatan National High School
- Lunib Integrated School
- Maraya National High School
- Sagucan National High School
