= Zamboanga del Sur's 2nd congressional district =

Legislative district of the Philippines

- Constituency for the House of Representatives of the Philippines
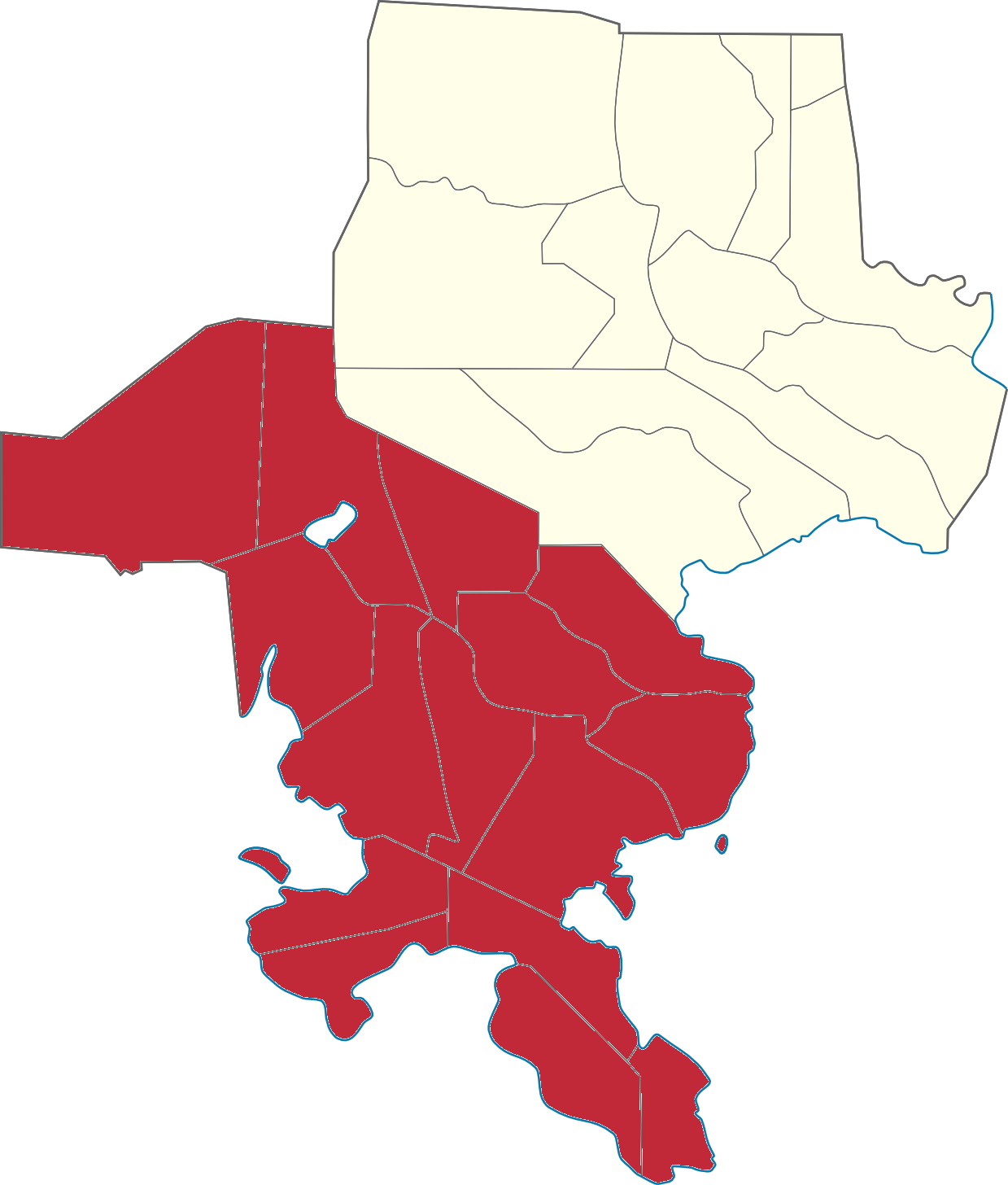
- Boundary of Zamboanga del Sur's 2nd congressional district in Zamboanga del Sur

- Location of Zamboanga del Sur within the Philippines
- Province: Zamboanga del Sur
- Region: Zamboanga Peninsula
- Population: 420,514 (2020)
- Electorate: 277,350 (2022)
- Major settlements: 15 LGUs: Municipalities; Bayog; Dimataling; Dinas; Dumalinao; Guipos; Kumalarang; Lakewood; Lapuyan; Margosatubig; Pitogo; San Miguel; San Pablo; Tabina; Tigbao; Vincenzo A. Sagun
- Area: 2,318.97 km^{2} (895.36 sq mi)

Current constituency
- Created: 1987
- Representative: Jeyzel Victoria Yu
- Political party: Lakas–CMD
- Congressional bloc: Majority

Zamboanga del Sur's 2nd congressional district is one of the two congressional districts of the Philippines in the province of Zamboanga del Sur. It has been represented in the House of Representatives since 1987. The district encompasses the southern half of the province consisting of the municipalities of Bayog, Dimataling, Dinas, Dumalinao, Guipos, Kumalarang, Lakewood, Lapuyan, Margosatubig, Pitogo, San Miguel, San Pablo, Tabina, Tigbao and Vincenzo A. Sagun. It is currently represented in the 20th Congress by Jeyzel Victoria Yu of the Lakas–CMD.

== Representation history ==
#	Image	Member	Term of office		Congress	Party	Electoral history	Constituent LGUs
#	Image	Member	Start	End	Congress	Party	Electoral history	Constituent LGUs
=== Zamboanga del Sur's 2nd district for the House of Representatives of the Philippines ===
District created February 2, 1987 from Zamboanga del Sur's at-large district.
1		Antonio Cerilles	June 30, 1987	June 30, 1998	8th	Nacionalista	Elected in 1987.	1987–1992; Bayog, Dimataling, Dinas, Dumalinao, Kumalarang, Lakewood, Lapuyan, Margosatubig, Pitogo, San Miguel, San Pablo, Tabina, Vincenzo A. Sagun
1		Antonio Cerilles	June 30, 1987	June 30, 1998	9th	NPC	Re-elected in 1992.	1992–present Bayog, Dimataling, Dinas, Dumalinao, Guipos, Kumalarang, Lakewood, Lapuyan, Margosatubig, Pitogo, San Miguel, San Pablo, Tabina, Tigbao, Vincenzo A. Sagun
1		Antonio Cerilles	June 30, 1987	June 30, 1998	10th	NPC	Re-elected in 1995.	1992–present Bayog, Dimataling, Dinas, Dumalinao, Guipos, Kumalarang, Lakewood, Lapuyan, Margosatubig, Pitogo, San Miguel, San Pablo, Tabina, Tigbao, Vincenzo A. Sagun
2		Aurora E. Cerilles	June 30, 1998	June 30, 2001	11th	LAMMP	Elected in 1998.	1992–present Bayog, Dimataling, Dinas, Dumalinao, Guipos, Kumalarang, Lakewood, Lapuyan, Margosatubig, Pitogo, San Miguel, San Pablo, Tabina, Tigbao, Vincenzo A. Sagun
3		Filomena S. San Juan	June 30, 2001	June 30, 2004	12th	Lakas	Elected in 2001.	1992–present Bayog, Dimataling, Dinas, Dumalinao, Guipos, Kumalarang, Lakewood, Lapuyan, Margosatubig, Pitogo, San Miguel, San Pablo, Tabina, Tigbao, Vincenzo A. Sagun
(1)		Antonio Cerilles	June 30, 2004	June 30, 2010	13th	NPC	Elected in 2004.	1992–present Bayog, Dimataling, Dinas, Dumalinao, Guipos, Kumalarang, Lakewood, Lapuyan, Margosatubig, Pitogo, San Miguel, San Pablo, Tabina, Tigbao, Vincenzo A. Sagun
(1)		Antonio Cerilles	June 30, 2004	June 30, 2010	14th	Lakas	Re-elected in 2007.	1992–present Bayog, Dimataling, Dinas, Dumalinao, Guipos, Kumalarang, Lakewood, Lapuyan, Margosatubig, Pitogo, San Miguel, San Pablo, Tabina, Tigbao, Vincenzo A. Sagun
(2)		Aurora E. Cerilles	June 30, 2010	June 30, 2019	15th	Lakas	Elected in 2010.	1992–present Bayog, Dimataling, Dinas, Dumalinao, Guipos, Kumalarang, Lakewood, Lapuyan, Margosatubig, Pitogo, San Miguel, San Pablo, Tabina, Tigbao, Vincenzo A. Sagun
(2)		Aurora E. Cerilles	June 30, 2010	June 30, 2019	16th	NPC	Re-elected in 2013.	1992–present Bayog, Dimataling, Dinas, Dumalinao, Guipos, Kumalarang, Lakewood, Lapuyan, Margosatubig, Pitogo, San Miguel, San Pablo, Tabina, Tigbao, Vincenzo A. Sagun
(2)		Aurora E. Cerilles	June 30, 2010	June 30, 2019	17th	NPC	Re-elected in 2016.	1992–present Bayog, Dimataling, Dinas, Dumalinao, Guipos, Kumalarang, Lakewood, Lapuyan, Margosatubig, Pitogo, San Miguel, San Pablo, Tabina, Tigbao, Vincenzo A. Sagun
4		Leonardo L. Babasa Jr.	June 30, 2019	June 30, 2022	18th	PDP–Laban	Elected in 2019.	1992–present Bayog, Dimataling, Dinas, Dumalinao, Guipos, Kumalarang, Lakewood, Lapuyan, Margosatubig, Pitogo, San Miguel, San Pablo, Tabina, Tigbao, Vincenzo A. Sagun
5		Jeyzel Victoria C. Yu	June 30, 2022	Incumbent	19th	PDP	Elected in 2022.	1992–present Bayog, Dimataling, Dinas, Dumalinao, Guipos, Kumalarang, Lakewood, Lapuyan, Margosatubig, Pitogo, San Miguel, San Pablo, Tabina, Tigbao, Vincenzo A. Sagun
5		Jeyzel Victoria C. Yu	June 30, 2022	Incumbent	20th	Lakas	Re-elected in 2025.	1992–present Bayog, Dimataling, Dinas, Dumalinao, Guipos, Kumalarang, Lakewood, Lapuyan, Margosatubig, Pitogo, San Miguel, San Pablo, Tabina, Tigbao, Vincenzo A. Sagun

== Election results ==
=== 2025 ===
Candidate	Party	Votes	%
Victoria Yu	Lakas–CMD	125,668	55.00
Auring Cerilles	Nationalist People's Coalition	102,804	45.00
Total		228,472	100.00
Valid votes		228,472	95.68
Invalid/blank votes		10,315	4.32
Total votes		238,787	100.00
Registered voters/turnout		283,148	84.33
Lakas–CMD gain from NPC			
Source: Commission on Elections

=== 2022 ===
2022 Philippine House of Representatives election at Zamboanga del Sur's 2nd District
Party	Candidate	Votes	%
PDP–Laban	Victoria Yu	104,055	49.04
Lakas	Jun Babasa	61,073	28.80
NPC	Antonio Cerilles	47,065	22.18
Total votes		212,193	100
PDP–Laban hold			

=== 2019 ===
2019 Philippine House of Representatives election at Zamboanga del Sur's 2nd District
Party	Candidate	Votes	%
PDP–Laban	Leonardo Babasa Jr.	94,362	51.72
NPC	Antonio Cerilles	88,074	48.28
Total votes		182,436	100.00
PDP–Laban gain from NPC			

=== 2016 ===
2016 Philippine House of Representatives election at Zamboanga del Sur's 2nd District
Party	Candidate	Votes	%
NPC	Aurora Enerio-Cerilles	117,658	92.31
Aksyon	James Yecyec	9,805	7.69
Total votes		127,463	
NPC hold			

=== 2013 ===
2013 Philippine House of Representatives election at Zamboanga del Sur's 2nd district
Party	Candidate	Votes	%	±%
NPC	Aurora Enerio-Cerilles	33,020		
Nacionalista	Marjorie "Cat" Jalosjos	19,374		
Independent	Rogelio Carbiera	370		
Margin of victory				
Rejected ballots				
Turnout				
NPC hold		Swing		

=== 2010 ===
Philippine House of Representatives election at Zamboanga del Sur's 2nd district
Party	Candidate	Votes	%
Lakas–Kampi	Aurora Enerio-Cerilles	120,933	81.46
Liberal	Tirsendo Poloyapoy	27,531	18.54
Valid ballots		148,464	91.82
Invalid or blank votes		13,220	8.18
Total votes		161,684	100.00
Lakas–Kampi hold			

== See also ==
- Legislative districts of Zamboanga del Sur
