= Dimataling =

Municipality in Zamboanga del Sur, Philippines

- Municipality
- Municipality of Dimataling
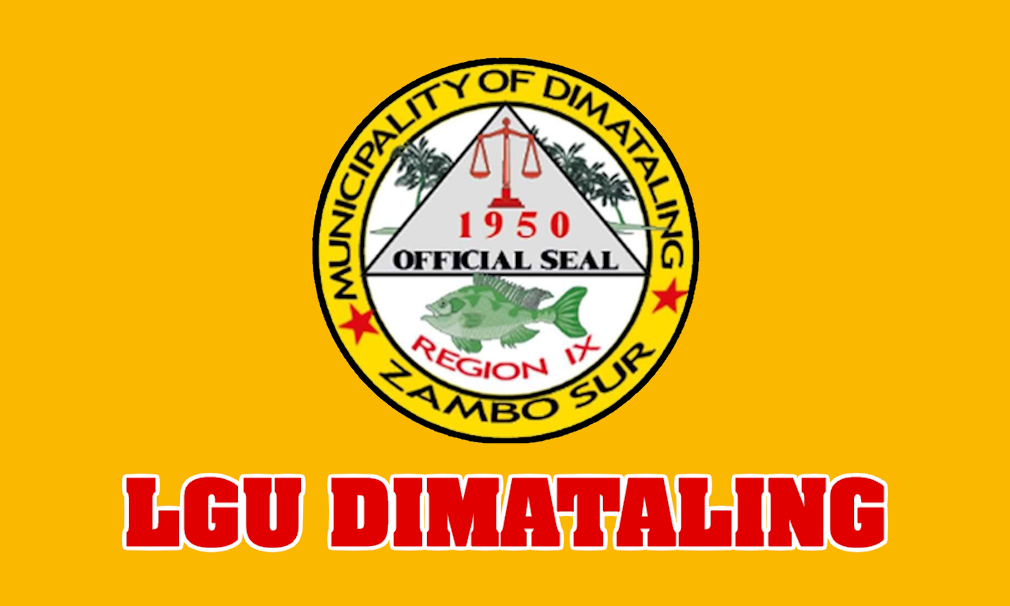
- Flag Seal

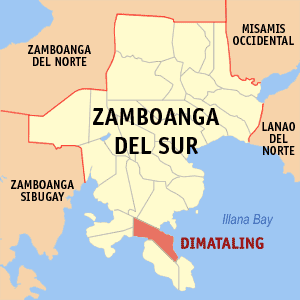
- Map of Zamboanga del Sur with Dimataling highlighted
- Interactive map of Dimataling
- Location within the Philippines
- Coordinates: 7°31′47″N 123°21′58″E
- Country: Philippines
- Region: Zamboanga Peninsula
- Province: Zamboanga del Sur
- District: 2nd district
- Founded: June 17, 1950
- Barangays: 24 (see Barangays)

Government
  - Type: Sangguniang Bayan
  - Mayor: Avelino J. Yrauda
  - Vice Mayor: Omar T. Buluan
  - Representative: Leonardo L. Babasa Jr.
  - Municipal Council: Members: Rolly C. Duran; Benny D. Carbero; Junaid M. Mustapha; Udtog T. Taug; Wilfredo P. Deocampo; Reyham C. Lazaga; Mary Villa P. Baya; Sinsuat S. Mustapha
  - Electorate: 22,755 voters (2025)

Area
  - Total: 141.80 km^{2} (54.75 sq mi)
- Elevation: 12 m (39 ft)
- Highest elevation: 146 m (479 ft)
- Lowest elevation: 0 m (0 ft)

Population (2024 census)
  - Total: 33,156
  - Density: 233.82/km^{2} (605.60/sq mi)
  - Households: 7,252

Economy
  - Income class: 3rd municipal income class
  - Poverty incidence: 39.79% (2023)
  - Revenue: ₱ 170.8 million (2024)
  - Assets: ₱ 551.8 million (2024)
  - Expenditure: ₱ 48.59 million (2024)
  - Liabilities: ₱ 221.5 million (2024)

Service provider
  - Electricity: Zamboanga del Sur 1 Electric Cooperative (ZAMSURECO 1)
- Time zone: UTC+8 (PST)
- ZIP code: 7032
- PSGC: 0907305000
- IDD : area code: +63 (0)62
- Native languages: Subanon; Cebuano; Chavacano; Tagalog; Maguindanao; Maranao
- Website: www.zds-dimataling.gov.ph

Dimataling, officially the Municipality of Dimataling (Cebuano: Lungsod sa Dimataling; Subanen: Benwa Dimataling; Maguindanaon: Inged nu Dimataling, Jawi: ايڠد نو دمتالڠ; Maranao: Inged a Dimataling; Chavacano: Municipalidad de Dimataling; Tagalog: Bayan ng Dimataling), is a municipality in the province of Zamboanga del Sur, Philippines. According to the 2024 census, it has a population of 33,156 people.

Dimataling was created in 1950 from the barrios of Dinas, Legarda, Mirapao, Migpulao, Kalipapa, Pisaan, Bubway, Tiniguangan, Tabina and Dimataling from Pagadian (not yet as a city at that time) and the barrios of Punta Flecha, Pitogo, Qugbay, Balong-balong, Libertad and Dumanguilas from Margosatubig.

== Geography ==
=== Barangays ===
Dimataling is administratively subdivided into 24 barangays. Each barangay consists of puroks while some have sitios.

- Bacayawan
- Baha
- Balanagan
- Baluno
- Binuay
- Buburay
- Grap
- Josefina
- Kagawasan
- Lalab
- Libertad
- Magahis
- Mahayag
- Mercedes
- Poblacion
- Saloagan
- San Roque
- Sugbay Uno
- Sumbato
- Sumpot
- Tinggabulong
- Tiniguangan
- Tipangi
- Upper Ludiong

=== Climate ===
Climate data for Dimataling, Zamboanga del Sur
Month	Jan	Feb	Mar	Apr	May	Jun	Jul	Aug	Sep	Oct	Nov	Dec	Year
Mean daily maximum °C (°F)	31 (88)	31 (88)	32 (90)	32 (90)	31 (88)	30 (86)	29 (84)	29 (84)	29 (84)	29 (84)	30 (86)	31 (88)	30 (87)
Mean daily minimum °C (°F)	21 (70)	22 (72)	22 (72)	23 (73)	24 (75)	24 (75)	24 (75)	24 (75)	24 (75)	24 (75)	23 (73)	22 (72)	23 (74)
Average precipitation mm (inches)	22 (0.9)	18 (0.7)	23 (0.9)	24 (0.9)	67 (2.6)	120 (4.7)	132 (5.2)	156 (6.1)	119 (4.7)	124 (4.9)	54 (2.1)	24 (0.9)	883 (34.6)
Average rainy days	9.4	9.1	11.5	11.9	20.1	22.5	22.4	23.2	21.5	22.2	15.7	11.5	201
Source: Meteoblue

== Demographics ==
Population census of Dimataling
Year	Pop.	±% p.a.
1960	30,632	—
1970	28,341	−0.77%
1975	20,883	−5.94%
1980	16,497	−4.60%
1990	20,365	+2.13%
1995	23,116	+2.40%
2000	25,843	+2.42%
2007	26,902	+0.56%
2010	27,715	+1.09%
2015	30,081	+1.57%
2020	31,340	+0.87%
2024	33,156	+1.36%
Source: Philippine Statistics Authority

== Economy ==
Poverty incidence of Dimataling (%)

Source: Philippine Statistics Authority
