= Lakewood, Zamboanga del Sur =

Municipality in Zamboanga del Sur, Philippines

Lakewood
- Municipality
- Municipality of Lakewood
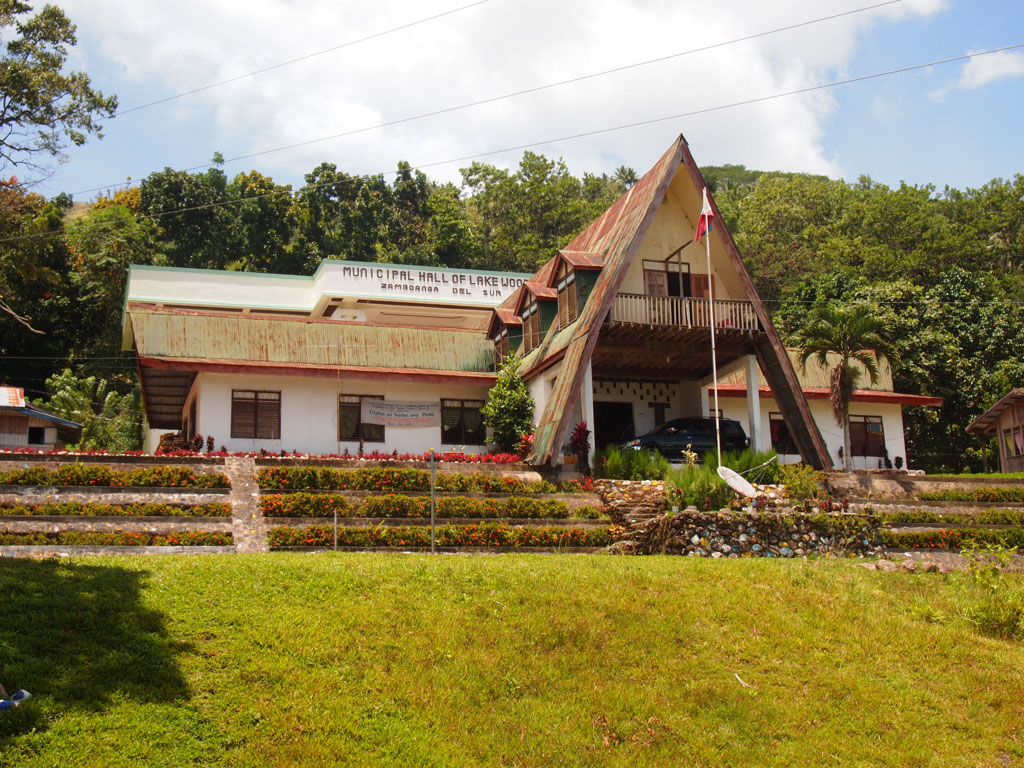
- Lakewood Municipal Hall

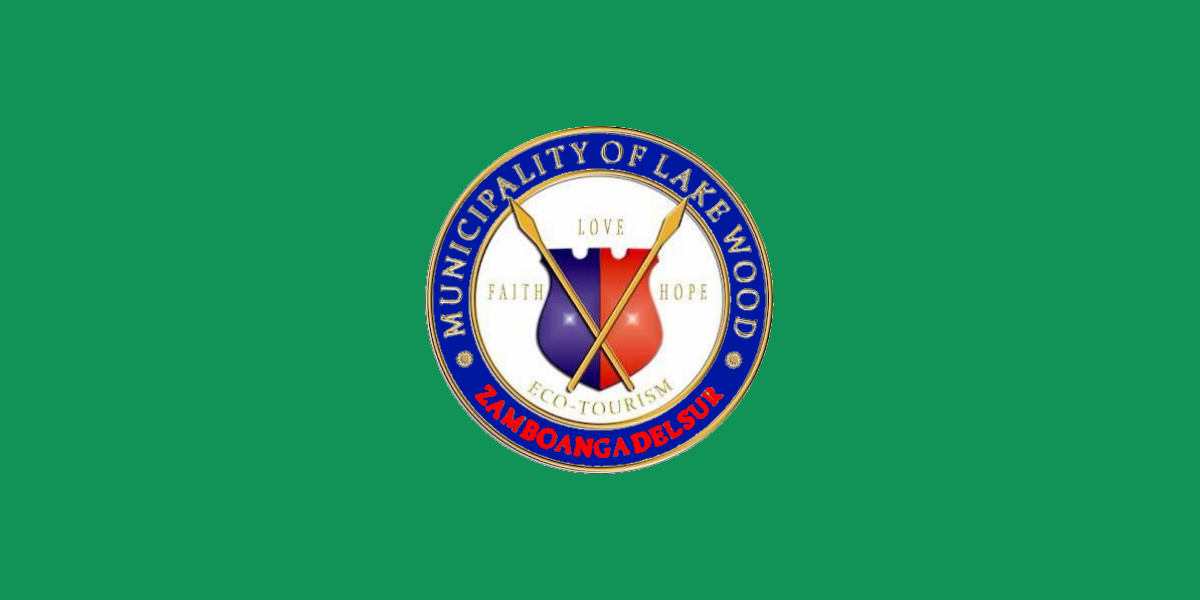
- Flag

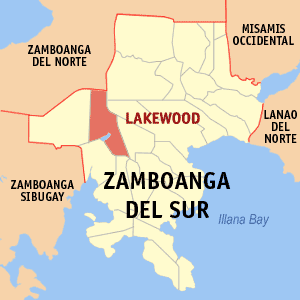
- Map of Zamboanga del Sur with Lakewood highlighted
- Interactive map of Lakewood
- Location within the Philippines
- Coordinates: 7°51′19″N 123°09′04″E
- Country: Philippines
- Region: Zamboanga Peninsula
- Province: Zamboanga del Sur
- District: 2nd district
- Founded: November 11, 1977
- Barangays: 14 (see Barangays)

Government
  - Type: Sangguniang Bayan
  - Mayor: Domingo V. Mirrar (Lakas)
  - Vice Mayor: Arnel Pano (NPC)
  - Representative: Victoria Yu (Lakas)
  - Municipal Council: Members: Pepe Sugue; Catalina Duran; Ronaldo Looc; Jaime Yurong; Dodong Sacal; Dadoy Mag-aso; Dodong Banihit; Nilo Calanda
  - Electorate: 14,410 voters (2025)

Area
  - Total: 201.30 km^{2} (77.72 sq mi)
- Elevation: 409 m (1,342 ft)
- Highest elevation: 948 m (3,110 ft)
- Lowest elevation: 118 m (387 ft)

Population (2024 census)
  - Total: 23,599
  - Density: 117.23/km^{2} (303.63/sq mi)
  - Households: 4,735

Economy
  - Income class: 3rd municipal income class
  - Poverty incidence: 45.05% (2023)
  - Revenue: ₱ 158.1 million (2024)
  - Assets: ₱ 357.7 million (2024)
  - Expenditure: ₱ 46.83 million (2024)
  - Liabilities: ₱ 89.66 million (2024)

Service provider
  - Electricity: Zamboanga del Sur 2 Electric Cooperative (ZAMSURECO 2)
- Time zone: UTC+8 (PST)
- ZIP code: 7014
- PSGC: 0907333000
- IDD : area code: +63 (0)62
- Native languages: Subanon; Cebuano; Chavacano; Tagalog
- Website: www.zds-lakewood.gov.ph

Lakewood, officially the Municipality of Lakewood (Cebuano: Lungsod sa Lakewood; Subanen: Benwa Danaw; Chavacano: Municipalidad de Lakewood; Tagalog: Bayan ng Lakewood), is a municipality in the province of Zamboanga del Sur, Philippines. According to the 2024 census, it has a population of 23,599 people.

== Etymology ==
The old name of Lakewood is Danaw Likowai and Tubod is Obod. Its name derives from the Cebuano term tubod which means "spring". Its current name derived from Lake Wood, a large lake on which the poblacion is located.

== History ==
The municipality was founded on November 11, 1977, when Barangays Gatub and Bagong Kahayag of the Municipality of Kumalarang and Barangays Lakewood, Bolalawan, Sebugay, Bisuangan, Lokoan, Backing, Dagum, Sapang Pinolis, Tubod, Gasa, Tiwales and Matalang of the Municipality of Lapuyan were separated and formed into an independent municipality. The most popular species of fish in the province can only be caught in the lake: the carpa and porang.

The Subanen tribe is the major ethnic group living in the suburban areas; they cultivate vegetables and corn for their own use. Subanens have their own language, but they also speak Cebuano as a common language for conversation.

== Geography ==
=== Barangays ===
Lakewood is politically subdivided into 14 barangays. Each barangay consists of puroks while some have sitios.

- Bagong Kahayag
- Baking
- Biswangan
- Bululawan
- Dagum
- Gasa
- Gatub
- Lukuan
- Matalang
- Poblacion (Lakewood proper)
- Sapang Pinoles
- Sebuguey
- Tiwales
- Tubod

=== Climate ===
Climate data for Lakewood, Zamboanga del Sur
Month	Jan	Feb	Mar	Apr	May	Jun	Jul	Aug	Sep	Oct	Nov	Dec	Year
Mean daily maximum °C (°F)	28 (82)	28 (82)	29 (84)	30 (86)	28 (82)	28 (82)	27 (81)	27 (81)	28 (82)	27 (81)	28 (82)	28 (82)	28 (82)
Mean daily minimum °C (°F)	21 (70)	21 (70)	21 (70)	22 (72)	22 (72)	22 (72)	22 (72)	22 (72)	22 (72)	22 (72)	22 (72)	21 (70)	22 (71)
Average precipitation mm (inches)	48 (1.9)	44 (1.7)	56 (2.2)	56 (2.2)	112 (4.4)	135 (5.3)	124 (4.9)	124 (4.9)	115 (4.5)	134 (5.3)	90 (3.5)	56 (2.2)	1,094 (43)
Average rainy days	13.0	11.7	15.6	18.1	25.6	25.7	25.2	24.1	23.8	26.1	22.3	16.5	247.7
Source: Meteoblue

== Demographics ==
Population census of Lakewood
Year	Pop.	±% p.a.
1980	12,896	—
1990	13,376	+0.37%
1995	14,601	+1.66%
2000	16,317	+2.41%
2007	18,562	+1.79%
2010	19,645	+2.09%
2015	20,374	+0.70%
2020	21,559	+1.20%
2024	23,599	+2.19%
Source: Philippine Statistics Authority

== Economy ==
Poverty incidence of Lakewood (%)

Source: Philippine Statistics Authority

== Tourism ==
- Paved Walkway along the lake in Poblacion.
- Baka Falls in Barangay Gasa
- Majestic Waterfalls in Sitio Lanayan of Brgy. Gasa
- Trekking/Mountaineering and overview at Mount Sirungan, the peak of Lakewood
- Boating at the lake
- Trekking at Sitio Sawá to Pegampuan to Biswangan
- Cycling at Biswangan to Gasa Road

== Health ==
It has a hospital, the Singidas Medical Clinic, which is regarded as the cleanest hospital of the town.

== Notable personalities ==
- Felip Jhon Suson a.k.a. Ken - member of Filipino pop boy band, SB19
