= San Miguel, Zamboanga del Sur =

Municipality in Zamboanga del Sur, Philippines

San Miguel
- Municipality
- Municipality of San Miguel
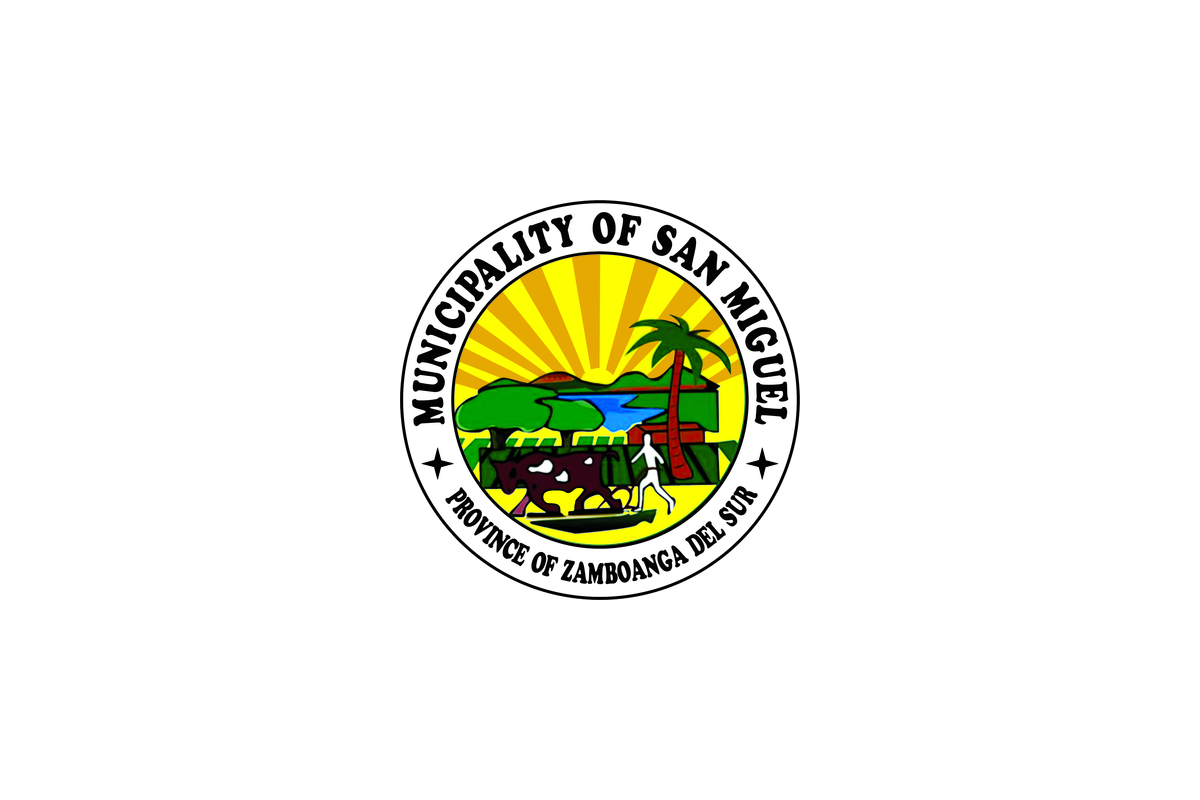
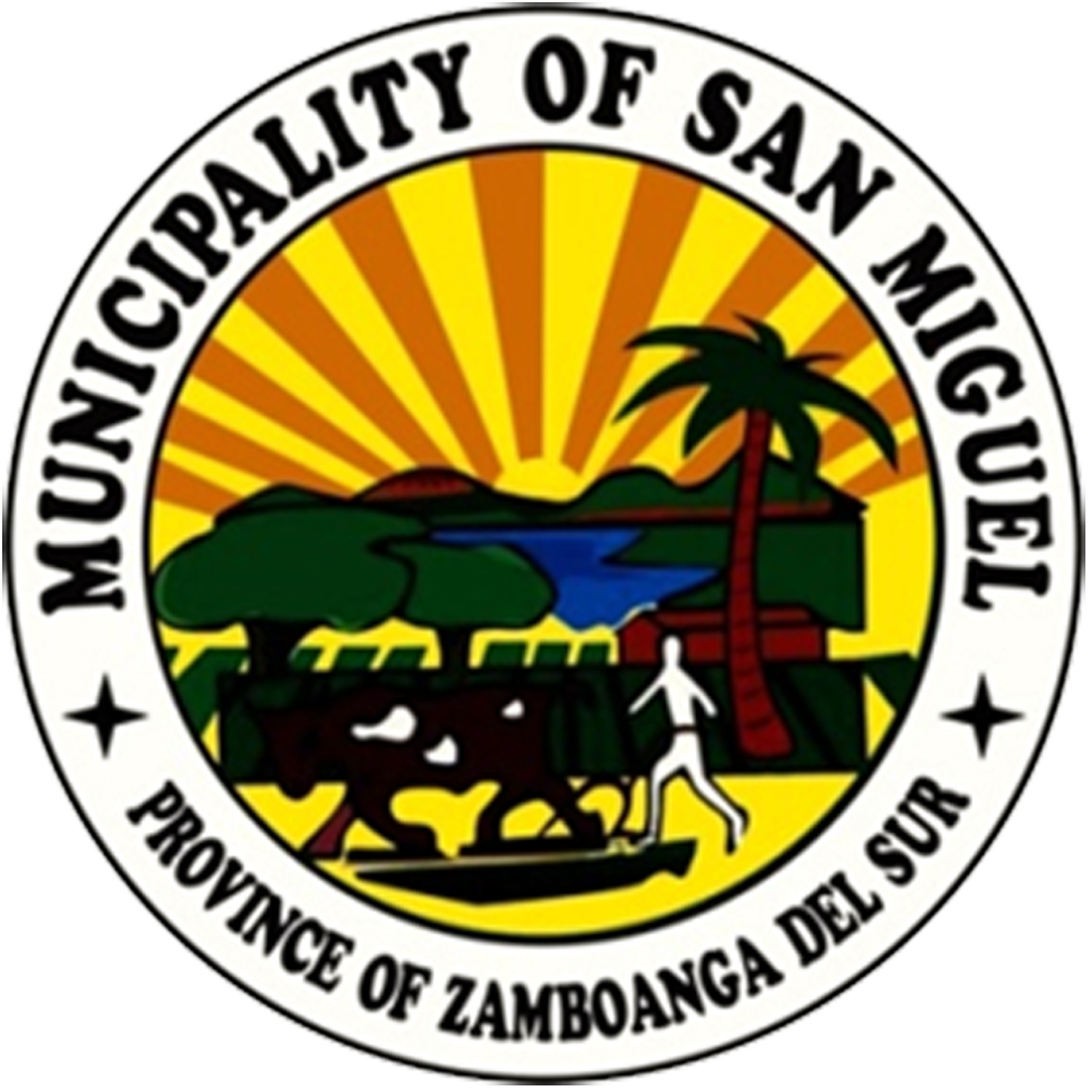
- Flag Seal

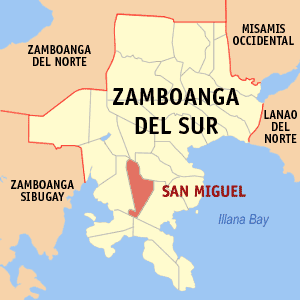
- Map of Zamboanga del Sur with San Miguel highlighted
- Interactive map of San Miguel
- Location within the Philippines
- Coordinates: 7°39′00″N 123°16′04″E
- Country: Philippines
- Region: Zamboanga Peninsula
- Province: Zamboanga del Sur
- District: 2nd district
- Founded: July 14, 1960
- Barangays: 18 (see Barangays)

Government
  - Type: Sangguniang Bayan
  - Mayor: Ex D. Ocapan
  - Vice Mayor: Wilma D. Ocapan
  - Representative: Jeyzel Victoria C. Yu
  - Municipal Council: Members: Sharmaine Rocel V. Loquias; Jerry B. Din; Mansueto M. Martinez; Rene Paulo Y. Quiñones; Diogracias B. Villoria; Eufrocena H. Amaya; Peter Jan Carlos D. Uro; Rosela M. Patigayon; Er D. Ocapan (Liga ng mga Barangay President); Gerald Pole S. Alcomendras (Sangguniang Kabataan President)
  - Electorate: 15,281 voters (2025)

Area
  - Total: 181.59 km^{2} (70.11 sq mi)
- Elevation: 271 m (889 ft)
- Highest elevation: 727 m (2,385 ft)
- Lowest elevation: 101 m (331 ft)

Population (2024 census)
  - Total: 20,037
  - Density: 110.34/km^{2} (285.78/sq mi)
  - Households: 4,469

Economy
  - Income class: 3rd municipal income class
  - Poverty incidence: 39.39% (2023)
  - Revenue: ₱ 152.9 million (2024)
  - Assets: ₱ 462.3 million (2024)
  - Expenditure: ₱ 38.57 million (2024)
  - Liabilities: ₱ 168.4 million (2024)

Service provider
  - Electricity: Zamboanga del Sur 1 Electric Cooperative (ZAMSURECO 1)
- Time zone: UTC+8 (PST)
- ZIP code: 7029
- PSGC: 0907324000
- IDD : area code: +63 (0)62
- Native languages: Subanon; Cebuano; Chavacano; Tagalog
- Website: sanmiguelzds.gov.ph

San Miguel, officially the Municipality of San Miguel (Cebuano: Lungsod sa San Miguel; Subanen: Benwa San Miguel; Chavacano: Municipalidad de San Miguel; Tagalog: Bayan ng San Miguel), is a municipality in the province of Zamboanga del Sur, Philippines. According to the 2024 census, it has a population of 20,037 people.

== Geography ==
=== Barangays ===
San Miguel is politically subdivided into 18 barangays. Each barangay consists of puroks while some have sitios.

- Betinan
- Bulawan
- Calube
- Concepcion
- Dao-an
- Dumalian
- Fatima
- Langilan
- Lantawan
- Laperian
- Libuganan
- Limonan
- Mati
- Ocapan
- Poblacion
- San Isidro
- Sayog
- Tapian

=== Climate ===
Climate data for San Miguel, Zamboanga del Sur
Month	Jan	Feb	Mar	Apr	May	Jun	Jul	Aug	Sep	Oct	Nov	Dec	Year
Mean daily maximum °C (°F)	29 (84)	30 (86)	30 (86)	30 (86)	29 (84)	28 (82)	27 (81)	27 (81)	28 (82)	28 (82)	29 (84)	29 (84)	29 (84)
Mean daily minimum °C (°F)	20 (68)	20 (68)	21 (70)	22 (72)	23 (73)	23 (73)	22 (72)	22 (72)	22 (72)	22 (72)	22 (72)	20 (68)	22 (71)
Average precipitation mm (inches)	22 (0.9)	18 (0.7)	23 (0.9)	24 (0.9)	67 (2.6)	120 (4.7)	132 (5.2)	156 (6.1)	119 (4.7)	124 (4.9)	54 (2.1)	24 (0.9)	883 (34.6)
Average rainy days	9.4	9.1	11.5	11.9	20.1	22.5	22.4	23.2	21.5	22.2	15.7	11.5	201
Source: Meteoblue

== Demographics ==
Population census of San Miguel
Year	Pop.	±% p.a.
1970	13,959	—
1975	14,184	+0.32%
1980	16,359	+2.89%
1990	19,627	+1.84%
1995	14,054	−6.07%
2000	15,269	+1.79%
2007	16,981	+1.48%
2010	18,258	+2.67%
2015	19,205	+0.97%
2020	19,838	+0.68%
2024	20,037	+0.24%
Source: Philippine Statistics Authority

== Economy ==
Poverty incidence of San Miguel (%)

Source: Philippine Statistics Authority
