= Dumalinao =

Municipality in Zamboanga del Sur, Philippines

- Municipality
- Municipality of Dumalinao
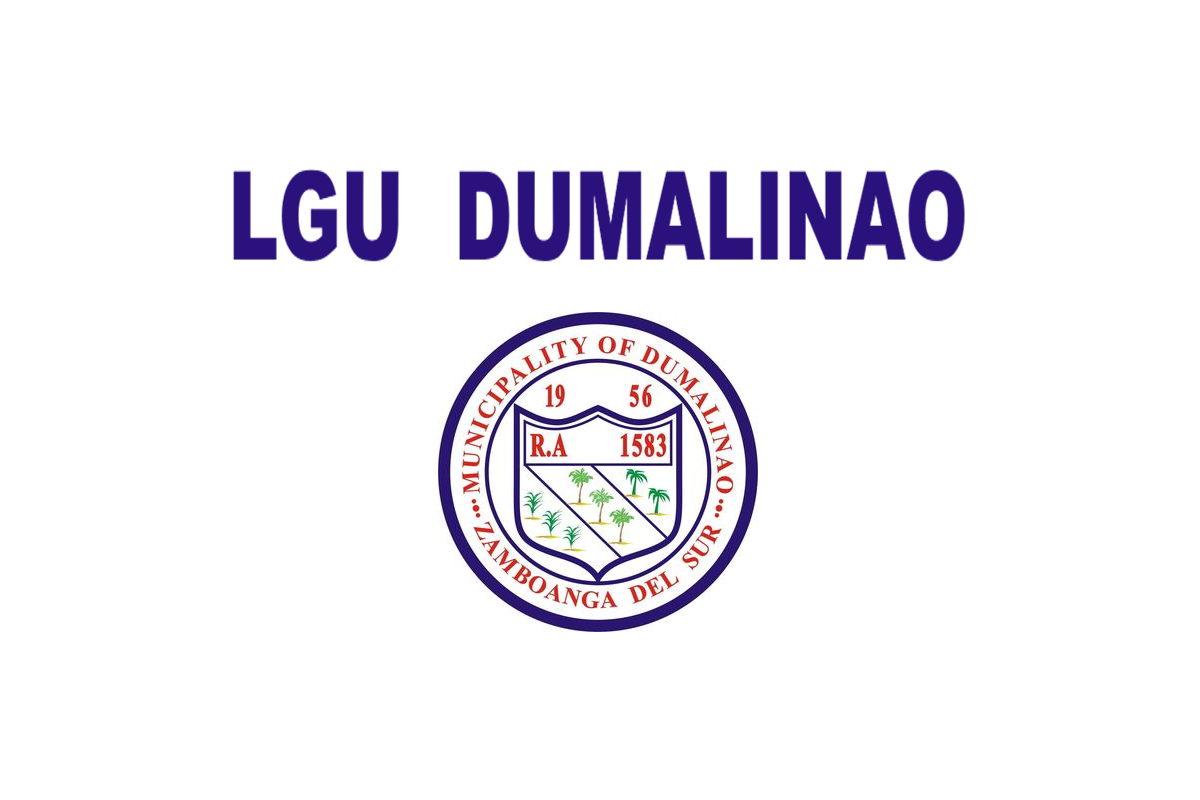
- Flag Seal

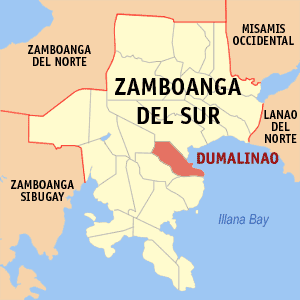
- Map of Zamboanga del Sur with Dumalinao highlighted
- Interactive map of Dumalinao
- Location within the Philippines
- Coordinates: 7°49′N 123°22′E
- Country: Philippines
- Region: Zamboanga Peninsula
- Province: Zamboanga del Sur
- District: 2nd district
- Founded: June 16, 1956
- Barangays: 30 (see Barangays)

Government
  - Type: Sangguniang Bayan
  - Mayor: Junaflor S. Cerilles
  - Vice Mayor: Wilfredo L. Malong Sr.
  - Representative: Leonardo L. Babasa Jr.
  - Municipal Council: Members: Helen C. Encabo; Romeo G. Ligan; Jelito R. Peñonal; Arnold L. Flores; Elynor S. Cortez; Gleewin L. Rubio; Gerardo Y. Gamal; Zenaida C. Losabia
  - Electorate: 22,931 voters (2025)

Area
  - Total: 117.64 km^{2} (45.42 sq mi)
- Highest elevation: 660 m (2,170 ft)
- Lowest elevation: 82 m (269 ft)

Population (2024 census)
  - Total: 34,188
  - Density: 290.62/km^{2} (752.69/sq mi)
  - Households: 7,767
- Demonym: Dumalinaoan

Economy
  - Income class: 2nd municipal income class
  - Poverty incidence: 33.85% (2023)
  - Revenue: ₱ 175.9 million (2024)
  - Assets: ₱ 509.2 million (2024)
  - Expenditure: ₱ 48.6 million (2024)
  - Liabilities: ₱ 111.1 million (2024)

Service provider
  - Electricity: Zamboanga del Sur 1 Electric Cooperative (ZAMSURECO 1)
- Time zone: UTC+8 (PST)
- ZIP code: 7015
- PSGC: 0907307000
- IDD : area code: +63 (0)62
- Native languages: Subanon; Cebuano; Chavacano; Tagalog
- Website: dumalinao.gov.ph

Dumalinao, officially the Municipality of Dumalinao (Cebuano: Lungsod sa Dumalinao; Subanen: Benwa Dumalinao; Chavacano: Municipalidad de Dumalinao; Tagalog: Bayan ng Dumalinao), is a municipality in the province of Zamboanga del Sur, Philippines. According to the 2024 census, it has a population of 34,188 people.

== History ==
In 1956, the barrios of Dumalinao Proper, Bigong, Ticwas, Bulongating, Baguitan, Pantad, Napulan, Tagulo, Camanga, Margang, Sibucao, Tina, Guling, Miculong, Baga, Rebucon, Mama and Bibilik were separated from Pagadian and constituted into Dumalinao through House Bill No. 5000, which later became Republic Act No. 1593 and approved on June 16, 1956. The person responsible for sponsoring the bill was Congressman Alberto Ubay of Zamboanga del Norte since during that time, Zamboanga del Sur had no congressman; Rep. Roseller T. Lim that time had been elected to the Senate in the 1955 special election.

Martin D. Raluto was first appointed municipal mayor with Guillermo Talaid as his vice mayor. The new town then had four councilors: Vicente T. Labrado, Severino Ramas, Fulgencio Lauglaug, and Eniiego Gemina, although the latter did not serve. Raluto held the position of municipal mayor until his death on June 11, 1969.

== Geography ==
=== Barangays ===
Dumalinao is politically subdivided into 30 barangays. Each barangay consists of puroks while some have sitios.

- Anonang
- Bag-ong Misamis
- Bag-ong Silao
- Baga
- Baloboan
- Banta-ao
- Bibilik
- Calingayan
- Camalig
- Camanga
- Cuatro-cuatro
- Locuban
- Malasik
- Mama (San Juan)
- Matab-ang
- Mecolong
- Metokong
- Motosawa
- Pag-asa (Poblacion)
- Paglaum (Poblacion)
- Pantad
- Piniglibano
- Rebokon
- San Agustin
- Sebucao
- Sumadat
- Tikwas
- Tina
- Tubo-Pait
- Upper Dumalinao

=== Climate ===
Climate data for Dumalinao, Zamboanga del Sur
Month	Jan	Feb	Mar	Apr	May	Jun	Jul	Aug	Sep	Oct	Nov	Dec	Year
Mean daily maximum °C (°F)	29 (84)	30 (86)	30 (86)	30 (86)	29 (84)	28 (82)	27 (81)	27 (81)	28 (82)	28 (82)	29 (84)	29 (84)	29 (84)
Mean daily minimum °C (°F)	20 (68)	20 (68)	21 (70)	22 (72)	23 (73)	23 (73)	22 (72)	22 (72)	22 (72)	22 (72)	22 (72)	20 (68)	22 (71)
Average precipitation mm (inches)	22 (0.9)	18 (0.7)	23 (0.9)	24 (0.9)	67 (2.6)	120 (4.7)	132 (5.2)	156 (6.1)	119 (4.7)	124 (4.9)	54 (2.1)	24 (0.9)	883 (34.6)
Average rainy days	9.4	9.1	11.5	11.9	20.1	22.5	22.4	23.2	21.5	22.2	15.7	11.5	201
Source: Meteoblue

== Demographics ==
Population census of Dumalinao
Year	Pop.	±% p.a.
1960	29,986	—
1970	34,169	+1.31%
1975	36,993	+1.61%
1980	36,604	−0.21%
1990	45,026	+2.09%
1995	23,985	−11.13%
2000	26,030	+1.77%
2007	29,732	+1.85%
2010	30,691	+1.16%
2015	32,013	+0.81%
2020	32,928	+0.59%
2024	34,188	+0.91%
Source: Philippine Statistics Authority

== Economy ==
Poverty incidence of Dumalinao (%)

Source: Philippine Statistics Authority

Agriculture is the main economic activity as well as the number one source of livelihood of the people, although Dumalinao is a coastal town. The town is one of the major rice granaries of Zamboanga del Sur as 5,998 hectares of the land area is devoted to agricultural production. The crops planted on these lands include rice, corn, coconut, banana, and root crops. Corn, in particular, is the municipality's main agricultural crop. An estimated 2,837 hectares of the land are utilized for corn production, with an average of 30 ca-vans per hectare (or 8.5 million kilos annually). On top of that, Dumalinao's climate is very conducive for growing corn, so much so that farmers usually get to have two croppings of corn per year. An estimated value of Php 51 million comes from the annual production of corn.

== Local Government ==
Position	Official
Representative	Jeyzel Victoria C. Yu (PDP-Laban)
Mayor	Junaflor S. Cerilles (NP)
Vice Mayor	Wilfredo L. Malong Sr. (NP)
Sangguniang Bayan Members
Ronaldo Encabo (PDP-Laban)
Arnold L. Flores (NPC)
Frederick R. Balandra (PPP)
Hermes Cabales (PDDS)
Rholly Labang (PDP-Laban)
Ma Gemma Albiso (PDP-Laban)
Romeo G. Ligan (NP)
Jelito R. Peñonal (NP)
