= Pitogo, Zamboanga del Sur =

Municipality in Zamboanga del Sur, Philippines

Pitogo
- Municipality
- Municipality of Pitogo
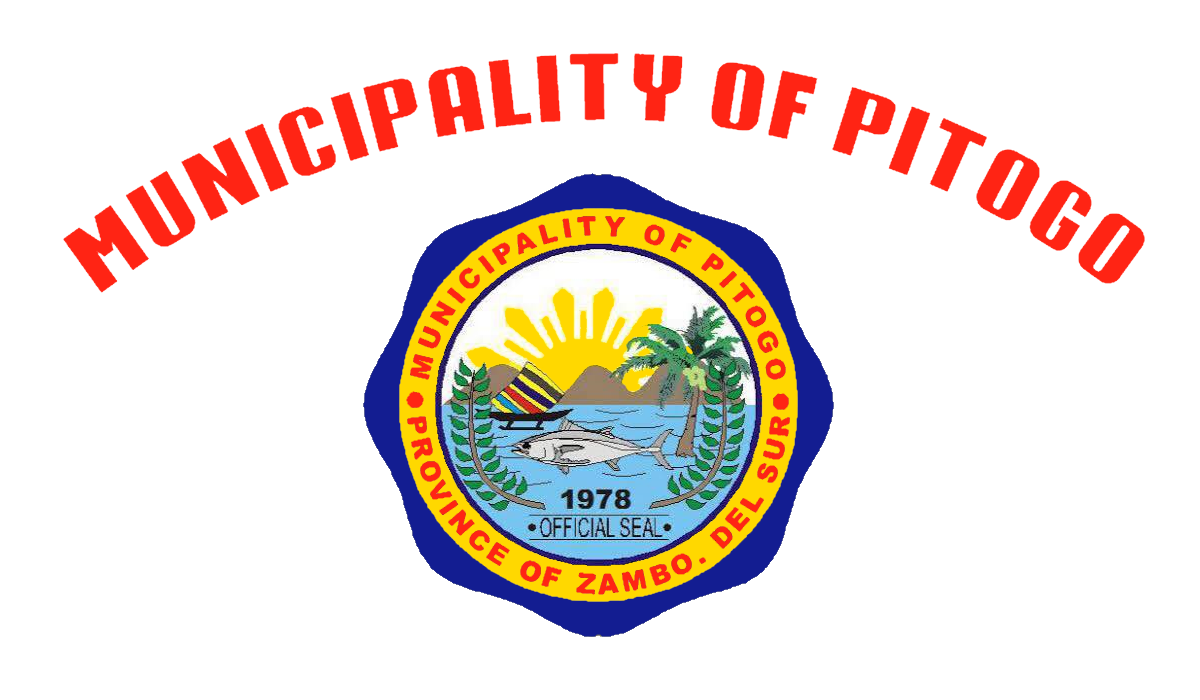
- Flag Seal

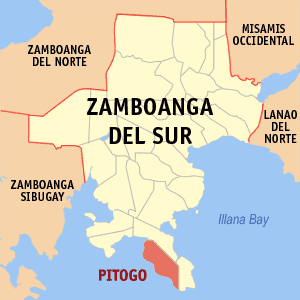
- Map of Zamboanga del Sur with Pitogo highlighted
- Interactive map of Pitogo
- Location within the Philippines
- Coordinates: 7°27′13″N 123°18′48″E
- Country: Philippines
- Region: Zamboanga Peninsula
- Province: Zamboanga del Sur
- District: 2nd district
- Founded: July 16, 1978
- Barangays: 15 (see Barangays)

Government
  - Type: Sangguniang Bayan
  - Mayor: James L. Yecyec
  - Vice Mayor: Zosimo V. Garban
  - Representative: Leonardo L. Babasa Jr.
  - Municipal Council: Members: Florencio L. Benitez; Letecia C. Lumactod; Severiano V. Sedenio; Isidro G. Cabalog; Roger M. Mahinay; Clarence C. Kapa III; Leo C. Yecyec; Roel L. Galban
  - Electorate: 17,364 voters (2025)

Area
  - Total: 95.94 km^{2} (37.04 sq mi)
- Elevation: 33 m (108 ft)
- Highest elevation: 172 m (564 ft)
- Lowest elevation: −1 m (−3.3 ft)

Population (2024 census)
  - Total: 28,375
  - Density: 295.8/km^{2} (766.0/sq mi)
  - Households: 6,260

Economy
  - Income class: 3rd municipal income class
  - Poverty incidence: 38.3% (2023)
  - Revenue: ₱ 15.52 million (2024)
  - Assets: ₱ 442.1 million (2024)
  - Expenditure: ₱ 44.78 million (2024)
  - Liabilities: ₱ 152.8 million (2024)

Service provider
  - Electricity: Zamboanga del Sur 1 Electric Cooperative (ZAMSURECO 1)
- Time zone: UTC+8 (PST)
- ZIP code: 7033
- PSGC: 0907338000
- IDD : area code: +63 (0)62
- Native languages: Subanon; Cebuano; Chavacano; Tagalog
- Website: www.zds-pitogo.gov.ph

Pitogo, officially the Municipality of Pitogo (Cebuano: Lungsod sa Pitogo; Subanen: Benwa Pitogo; Chavacano: Municipalidad de Pitogo; Tagalog: Bayan ng Pitogo), is a municipality in the province of Zamboanga del Sur, Philippines. According to the 2024 census, it has a population of 28,375 people.

== Geography ==
=== Barangays ===
Pitogo is politically subdivided into 15 barangays. Each barangay consists of puroks while some have sitios.

- Balabawan
- Balong-balong
- Colojo
- Liasan
- Liguac
- Limbayan
- Lower Paniki-an
- Matin-ao
- Panubigan
- Poblacion (Pitogo)
- Punta Flecha
- Sugbay Dos
- Tongao
- Upper Paniki-an
- San Isidro

=== Climate ===
Climate data for Pitogo, Zamboanga del Sur
Month	Jan	Feb	Mar	Apr	May	Jun	Jul	Aug	Sep	Oct	Nov	Dec	Year
Mean daily maximum °C (°F)	31 (88)	31 (88)	32 (90)	32 (90)	31 (88)	30 (86)	29 (84)	29 (84)	29 (84)	29 (84)	30 (86)	31 (88)	30 (87)
Mean daily minimum °C (°F)	21 (70)	22 (72)	22 (72)	23 (73)	24 (75)	24 (75)	24 (75)	24 (75)	24 (75)	24 (75)	23 (73)	22 (72)	23 (74)
Average precipitation mm (inches)	22 (0.9)	18 (0.7)	23 (0.9)	24 (0.9)	67 (2.6)	120 (4.7)	132 (5.2)	156 (6.1)	119 (4.7)	124 (4.9)	54 (2.1)	24 (0.9)	883 (34.6)
Average rainy days	9.4	9.1	11.5	11.9	20.1	22.5	22.4	23.2	21.5	22.2	15.7	11.5	201
Source: Meteoblue

== Demographics ==
Population census of Pitogo
Year	Pop.	±% p.a.
1980	14,156	—
1990	18,389	+2.65%
1995	19,870	+1.46%
2000	21,064	+1.26%
2007	25,231	+2.52%
2010	25,502	+0.39%
2015	27,057	+1.13%
2020	27,516	+0.35%
2024	28,375	+0.74%
Source: Philippine Statistics Authority

== Economy ==
Poverty incidence of Pitogo (%)

Source: Philippine Statistics Authority
