= Dinas, Zamboanga del Sur =

Municipality in Zamboanga del Sur, Philippines

Dinas دينس
- Municipality
- Municipality of Dinas
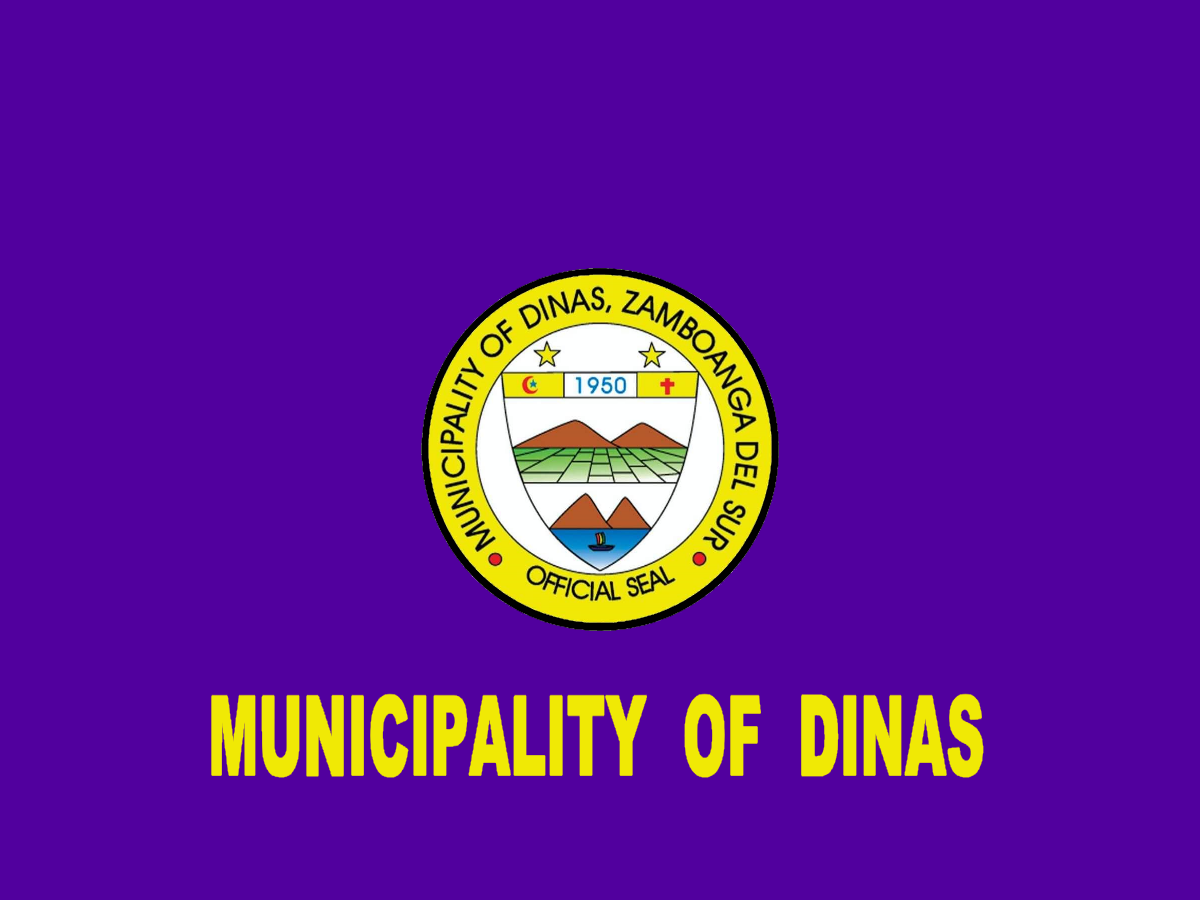
- Flag Seal

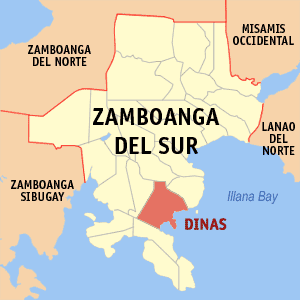
- Map of Zamboanga del Sur with Dinas highlighted
- Interactive map of Dinas
- Location within the Philippines
- Coordinates: 7°36′58″N 123°20′16″E
- Country: Philippines
- Region: Zamboanga Peninsula
- Province: Zamboanga del Sur
- District: 2nd district
- Founded: June 17, 1950
- Barangays: 30 (see Barangays)

Government
  - Type: Sangguniang Bayan
  - Mayor: Eleazer Ybañez Asoy
  - Vice Mayor: Muads A. Maulana
  - Representative: Jeyzel Victoria Cabardo Yu
  - Municipal Council: Members: Andrew Jose Chavez; Kanakan Salazar Mangumpig; Kemji Uy Edao; Chezza Mae B. Asoy - Ramonal; Frederick Asoy Albios; Jan Rainbow Arañez Domingo; Adnan Abubo Lao; Camaroden Maulana
  - Electorate: 21,996 voters (2025)

Area
  - Total: 121.10 km^{2} (46.76 sq mi)
- Elevation: 93 m (305 ft)
- Highest elevation: 484 m (1,588 ft)
- Lowest elevation: −2 m (−6.6 ft)

Population (2024 census)
  - Total: 35,409
  - Density: 292.39/km^{2} (757.30/sq mi)
  - Households: 8,595

Economy
  - Income class: 2nd municipal income class
  - Poverty incidence: 39.65% (2023)
  - Revenue: ₱ 176.6 million (2024)
  - Assets: ₱ 535.3 million (2024)
  - Expenditure: ₱ 42.47 million (2024)
  - Liabilities: ₱ 176.7 million (2024)

Service provider
  - Electricity: Zamboanga del Sur 1 Electric Cooperative (ZAMSURECO 1)
- Time zone: UTC+8 (PST)
- ZIP code: 7015
- PSGC: 0907306000
- IDD : area code: +63 (0)62
- Native languages: Subanon; Cebuano; Chavacano; Tagalog; Maguindanaon; Maranao
- Website: www.zds-dinas.gov.ph

Dinas, officially the Municipality of Dinas (Cebuano: Lungsod sa Dinas; Subanen: Benwa Dinas; Maguindanaon: Inged nu Dinas, Jawi: ايڠد نو دينس; Maranao: Inged a Dinas; Chavacano: Municipalidad de Dinas; Tagalog: Bayan ng Dinas), is a municipality in the province of Zamboanga del Sur, Philippines. According to the 2024 census, it has a population of 35,409 people.

== History ==
Several theories have been woven and developed to explain the origins of the now known municipality of Dinas, which has been the cradle of Islamic culture and civilization, and a stronghold of anti-Hispanic colonization throughout the Baganian Peninsula in present-day Zamboanga del Sur. It was also one of the centers of Islamic influence of the great Maguindanao Sultanate in this region.

According to the old history that was received and educated by the descendants of the great Muhammad Dipatuan Kudarat, the descendant of the famous Sharif Kabungsuwan of Maguindanao, is that the name Dinas is taken from the Maguindanaon term di nas where di means 'no' and nas means 'bad luck' or 'unlucky'. This history is related to the arrival of the Maguindanao people to live and inhabit this place, side by side with the indigenous Subanon people.

Therefore, the early settlers who migrated from the province of Cotabato (especially from the areas now known as Maguindanao del Norte, Maguindanao del Sur, and Sultan Kudarat), consider their new residence to be neither a place that brings bad luck nor good fortune, because all the river mouths that flow to the coast face east, directly towards Illana Bay, which according to their beliefs is a sign of good luck.

The most popular legend passed down to this generation is that Dinas got its name by chance as a result of a communication gap between natives and foreigners. When the Spaniards came to the place, there was already a small settlement in Dinas organized by followers of Sharif Kabungsuwan. Within the community, there is only one grocery store that provides various household necessities supplied by Chinese traders, who often come from Zamboanga City.

One day, a group of Spaniards happened to visit the place as part of their Christianization campaign. They wandered around until they arrived at the only shop in the settlement, then they asked what the shop was called. The shop owner didn't understand a word of the Spanish, thinking the Spaniards were asking what he was selling because they were pointing at the pile of sardines on the shelf. The shop owner immediately replied, "sardinas!", the native word for sardines. The foreigner nodded reassuringly, "oh, dinas", and the Spaniards thought the place was called Dinas. This is where the municipality of Dinas got its name.

== Geography ==
=== Barangays ===
Dinas is politically subdivided into 30 barangays. Each barangay consists of puroks while some have sitios.

- Bacawan
- Benuatan
- Beray
- Don Jose
- Dongos
- East Migpulao
- Guinicolalay
- Ignacio Garrata (New Mirapao)
- Kinakap
- Legarda 1
- Legarda 2
- Legarda 3
- Lower Dimaya
- Locuban
- Ludiong
- Nangka
- Nian
- Old Mirapao
- Pisa-an
- Poblacion
- Proper Dimaya
- Sagacad
- Sambulawan
- San Isidro
- Songayan
- Sumpotan
- Tarakan
- Upper Dimaya
- Upper Sibul
- West Migpulao

=== Climate ===
Climate data for Dinas, Zamboanga del Sur
| Month | Jan | Feb | Mar | Apr | May | Jun | Jul | Aug | Sep | Oct | Nov | Dec | Year |
|---|---|---|---|---|---|---|---|---|---|---|---|---|---|
| Mean daily maximum °C (°F) | 31 (88) | 31 (88) | 32 (90) | 32 (90) | 30 (86) | 29 (84) | 29 (84) | 29 (84) | 29 (84) | 29 (84) | 30 (86) | 31 (88) | 30 (86) |
| Mean daily minimum °C (°F) | 21 (70) | 21 (70) | 22 (72) | 23 (73) | 24 (75) | 24 (75) | 24 (75) | 24 (75) | 24 (75) | 24 (75) | 23 (73) | 22 (72) | 23 (73) |
| Average precipitation mm (inches) | 22 (0.9) | 18 (0.7) | 23 (0.9) | 24 (0.9) | 67 (2.6) | 120 (4.7) | 132 (5.2) | 156 (6.1) | 119 (4.7) | 124 (4.9) | 54 (2.1) | 24 (0.9) | 883 (34.6) |
| Average rainy days | 9.4 | 9.1 | 11.5 | 11.9 | 20.1 | 22.5 | 22.4 | 23.2 | 21.5 | 22.2 | 15.7 | 11.5 | 201 |
Source: Meteoblue

== Demographics ==
Population census of Dinas
| Year | Pop. | ±% p.a. |
|---|---|---|
| 1960 | 29,500 | — |
| 1970 | 23,704 | −2.16% |
| 1975 | 23,081 | −0.53% |
| 1980 | 24,784 | +1.43% |
| 1990 | 28,141 | +1.28% |
| 1995 | 28,364 | +0.15% |
| 2000 | 31,570 | +2.32% |
| 2007 | 33,738 | +0.92% |
| 2010 | 34,768 | +1.10% |
| 2015 | 35,504 | +0.40% |
| 2020 | 36,291 | +0.46% |
| 2024 | 35,409 | −0.59% |
Source: Philippine Statistics Authority

== Economy ==
Poverty incidence of Dinas (%)

Source: Philippine Statistics Authority
