= San Pablo, Zamboanga del Sur =

Municipality in Zamboanga del Sur, Philippines

San Pablo Malbog
- Municipality
- Municipality of San Pablo
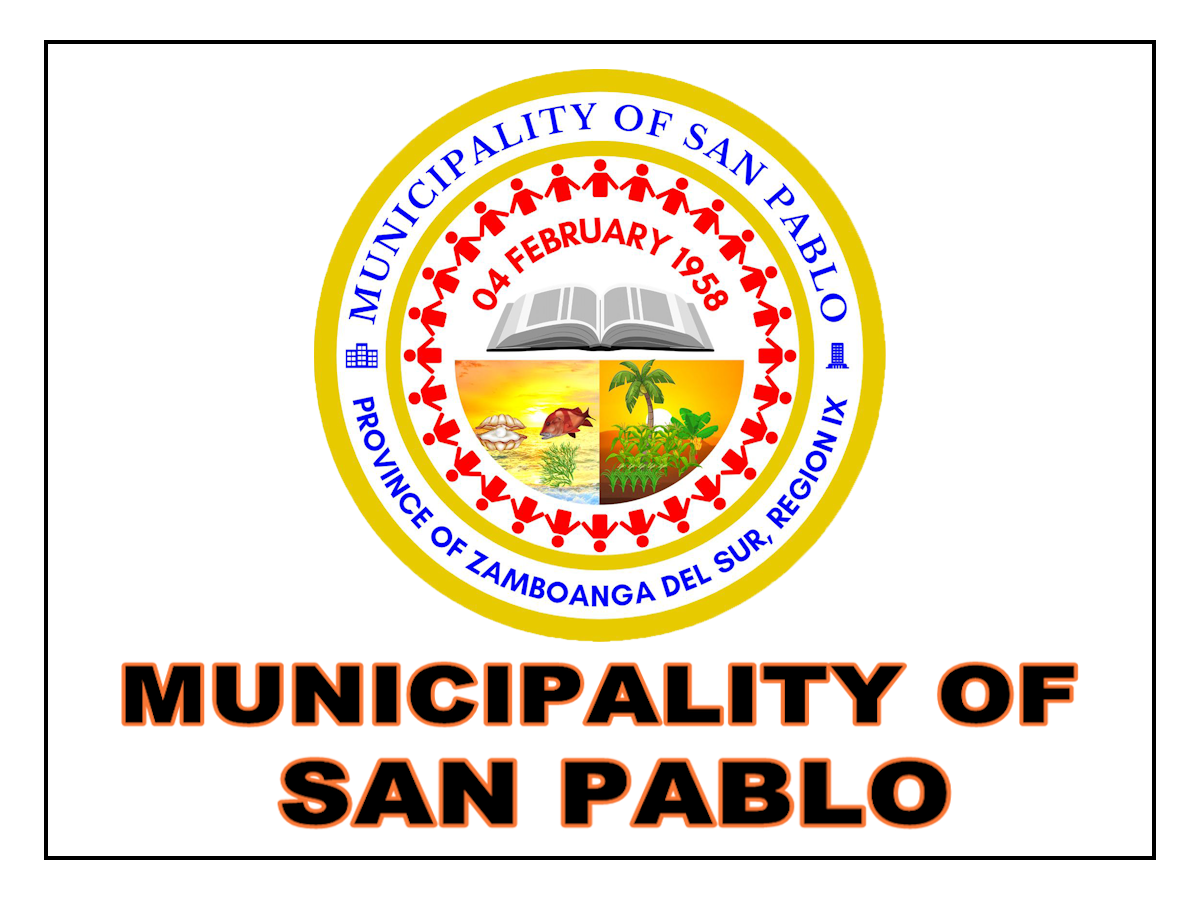
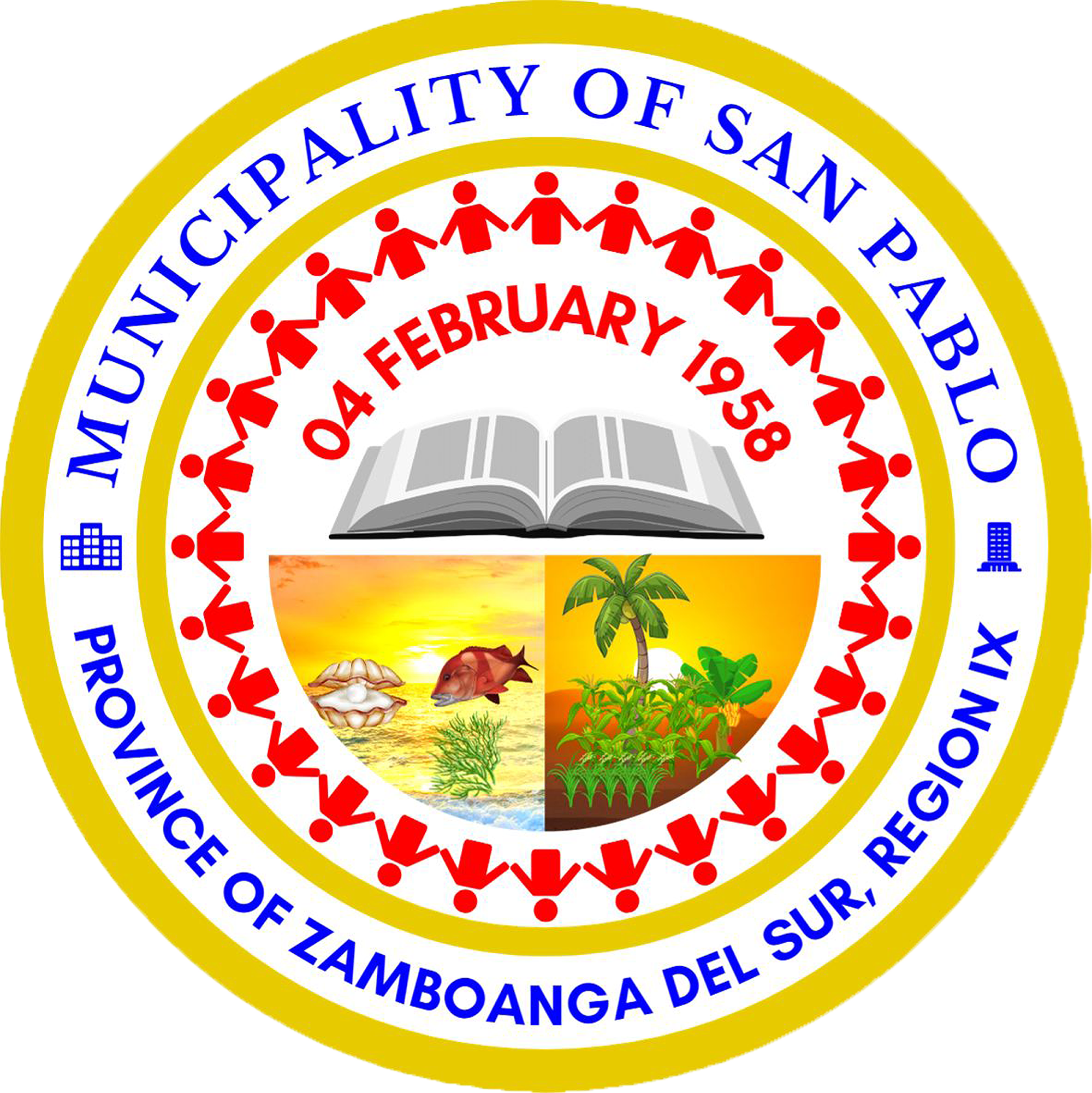
- Flag Seal

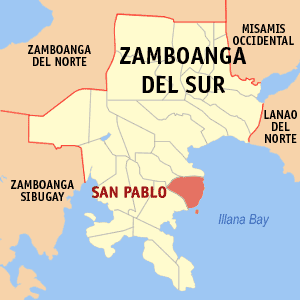
- Map of Zamboanga del Sur with San Pablo highlighted
- Interactive map of San Pablo
- Location within the Philippines
- Coordinates: 7°39′28″N 123°27′35″E
- Country: Philippines
- Region: Zamboanga Peninsula
- Province: Zamboanga del Sur
- District: 2nd district
- Founded: September 17, 1957
- Barangays: 28 (see Barangays)

Government
  - Type: Sangguniang Bayan
  - Mayor: Danilo A. Taucan
  - Vice Mayor: Flavio P. Cordero, Jr.
  - Representative: Jeyzel Victoria C. Yu
  - Municipal Council: Members: Jane Leisly L. Arellano; Raul R. Calunod; Jared P. Castillo; Andres M. Villanueva, III; Artemio C. Dayondon; Carlomagno A. Jambo; George R. Gonzales; Jonathan B. Medico
  - Electorate: 18,933 voters (2025)

Area
  - Total: 149.90 km^{2} (57.88 sq mi)
- Elevation: 94 m (308 ft)
- Highest elevation: 412 m (1,352 ft)
- Lowest elevation: 0 m (0 ft)

Population (2024 census)
  - Total: 26,166
  - Density: 174.56/km^{2} (452.10/sq mi)
  - Households: 6,278

Economy
  - Income class: 3rd municipal income class
  - Poverty incidence: 36.83% (2023)
  - Revenue: ₱ 159.9 million (2024)
  - Assets: ₱ 578.3 million (2024)
  - Expenditure: ₱ 48.72 million (2024)
  - Liabilities: ₱ 254.4 million (2024)

Service provider
  - Electricity: Zamboanga del Sur 1 Electric Cooperative (ZAMSURECO 1)
- Time zone: UTC+8 (PST)
- ZIP code: 7031
- PSGC: 0907325000
- IDD : area code: +63 (0)62
- Native languages: Subanon; Cebuano; Chavacano; Tagalog
- Website: sanpablozds.gov.ph.

San Pablo, officially the Municipality of San Pablo (Cebuano: Lungsod sa San Pablo; Subanen: Benwa San Pablo; Chavacano: Municipalidad de San Pablo; Tagalog: Bayan ng San Pablo), is a municipality in the province of Zamboanga del Sur, Philippines. According to the 2020 census, it has a population of 26,166 people.

== Geography ==
=== Barangays ===
San Pablo is politically subdivided into 28 barangays. Each barangay consists of puroks while some have sitios.

- Bag-ong Misamis
- Bubual
- Buton
- Culasian
- Daplayan
- Kalilangan
- Kapamanok
- Kondum
- Lumbayao
- Mabuhay
- Marcos Village
- Miasin
- Molansong
- Pantad
- Pao
- Payag
- Poblacion (San Pablo)
- Pongapong
- Sacbulan
- Sagasan
- San Juan
- Senior
- Songgoy
- Tandubuay
- Taniapan
- Ticala Island
- Tubo-pait
- Villakapa

=== Climate ===
Climate data for San Pablo, Zamboanga del Sur
Month	Jan	Feb	Mar	Apr	May	Jun	Jul	Aug	Sep	Oct	Nov	Dec	Year
Mean daily maximum °C (°F)	31 (88)	31 (88)	32 (90)	32 (90)	31 (88)	29 (84)	29 (84)	29 (84)	29 (84)	29 (84)	30 (86)	30 (86)	30 (86)
Mean daily minimum °C (°F)	21 (70)	21 (70)	22 (72)	23 (73)	24 (75)	24 (75)	24 (75)	24 (75)	24 (75)	24 (75)	23 (73)	22 (72)	23 (73)
Average precipitation mm (inches)	22 (0.9)	18 (0.7)	23 (0.9)	24 (0.9)	67 (2.6)	120 (4.7)	132 (5.2)	156 (6.1)	119 (4.7)	124 (4.9)	54 (2.1)	24 (0.9)	883 (34.6)
Average rainy days	9.4	9.1	11.5	11.9	20.1	22.5	22.4	23.2	21.5	22.2	15.7	11.5	201
Source: Meteoblue

== Demographics ==
Population census of San Pablo
Year	Pop.	±% p.a.
1960	10,364	—
1970	17,919	+5.62%
1975	16,171	−2.04%
1980	19,421	+3.73%
1990	21,230	+0.89%
1995	23,147	+1.63%
2000	23,450	+0.28%
2007	25,575	+1.20%
2010	26,500	+1.30%
2015	26,106	−0.28%
2020	26,648	+0.43%
2024	26,166	−0.44%
Source: Philippine Statistics Authority

== Economy ==
Poverty incidence of San Pablo (%)

Source: Philippine Statistics Authority
