= Kumalarang =

Municipality in Zamboanga del Sur, Philippines

- Municipality
- Municipality of Kumalarang
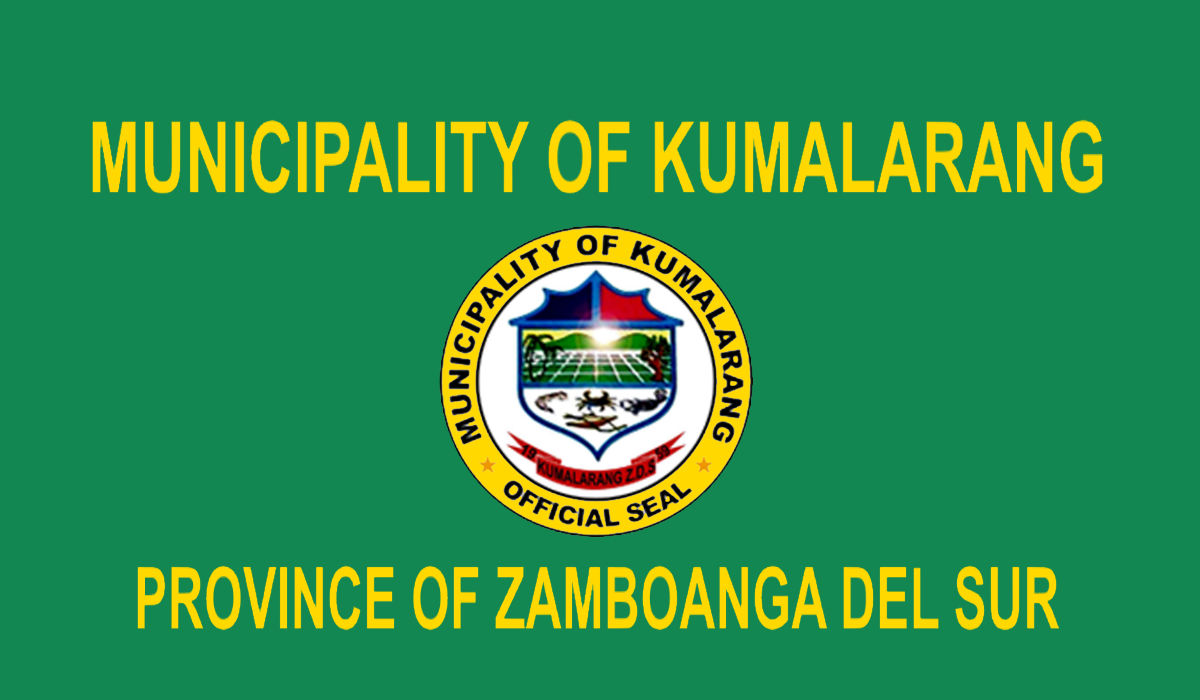
- Flag Seal

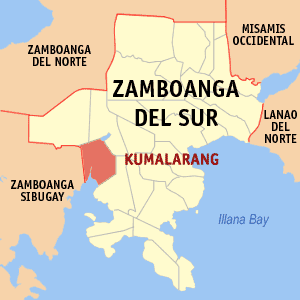
- Map of Zamboanga del Sur with Kumalarang highlighted
- Interactive map of Kumalarang
- Location within the Philippines
- Coordinates: 7°44′52″N 123°08′39″E
- Country: Philippines
- Region: Zamboanga Peninsula
- Province: Zamboanga del Sur
- District: 2nd district
- Founded: August 28, 1959
- Barangays: 18 (see Barangays)

Government
  - Type: Sangguniang Bayan
  - Mayor: Ruel G. Molina
  - Vice Mayor: Pinky P. Molina
  - Representative: Leonardo L. Babasa Jr.
  - Municipal Council: Members: Raniel Graciano O. Dormitorio; Rafunslear A. Ramos; Manuel B. Biaco; Sandy P. Bualan; Benito L. Roferos; Rolando O. Jayme; Jovert C. Dahunan; Abdulgani L. Edris
  - Electorate: 20,895 voters (2025)

Area
  - Total: 151.49 km^{2} (58.49 sq mi)
- Elevation: 103 m (338 ft)
- Highest elevation: 589 m (1,932 ft)
- Lowest elevation: 0 m (0 ft)

Population (2024 census)
  - Total: 30,815
  - Density: 203.41/km^{2} (526.84/sq mi)
  - Households: 6,739

Economy
  - Income class: 2nd municipal income class
  - Poverty incidence: 44.77% (2023)
  - Revenue: ₱ 170 million (2024)
  - Assets: ₱ 675.6 million (2024)
  - Expenditure: ₱ 50.49 million (2024)
  - Liabilities: ₱ 203.3 million (2024)

Service provider
  - Electricity: Zamboanga del Sur 2 Electric Cooperative (ZAMSURECO 2)
- Time zone: UTC+8 (PST)
- ZIP code: 7013
- PSGC: 0907311000
- IDD : area code: +63 (0)62
- Native languages: Subanon; Cebuano; Chavacano; Tagalog; Maguindanaon
- Website: www.zds-kumalarang.gov.ph

Kumalarang, officially the Municipality of Kumalarang (Cebuano: Lungsod sa Kumalarang; Subanen: Benwa Kumalarang; Maguindanaon: Inged nu Kumalarang, Jawi: ايڠد نو کملارڠ; Chavacano: Municipalidad de Kumalarang; Tagalog: Bayan ng Kumalarang), is a municipality in the province of Zamboanga del Sur, Philippines. According to the 2024 census, it has a population of 30,815 people.

== History ==
Kumalarang was organized into a municipality through Executive Order No. 356, issued by President Carlos P. Garcia on August 28, 1959. It consists of seven "barrios and sitios" of Lapuyan, including Barrio Kumalarang which was designated as the seat of government, and six of Malangas (now part of Zamboanga Sibugay), all then part of the then-undivided Zamboanga del Sur.

== Geography ==
=== Barangays ===
Kumalarang is politically subdivided into 18 barangays. Each barangay consists of puroks while some have sitios.

- Bogayo
- Bolisong
- Boyugan East
- Boyugan West
- Bualan
- Diplo
- Gawil
- Gusom
- Kitaan Dagat
- Lantawan
- Limamawand
- Mahayahay
- Pangi
- Picanan
- Poblacion
- Salagmanok
- Secade
- Suminalum

=== Climate ===
Climate data for Kumalarang, Zamboanga del Sur
| Month | Jan | Feb | Mar | Apr | May | Jun | Jul | Aug | Sep | Oct | Nov | Dec | Year |
|---|---|---|---|---|---|---|---|---|---|---|---|---|---|
| Mean daily maximum °C (°F) | 31 (88) | 31 (88) | 32 (90) | 32 (90) | 31 (88) | 30 (86) | 29 (84) | 29 (84) | 29 (84) | 29 (84) | 30 (86) | 31 (88) | 30 (87) |
| Mean daily minimum °C (°F) | 21 (70) | 22 (72) | 22 (72) | 23 (73) | 24 (75) | 24 (75) | 24 (75) | 24 (75) | 24 (75) | 24 (75) | 23 (73) | 22 (72) | 23 (74) |
| Average precipitation mm (inches) | 22 (0.9) | 18 (0.7) | 23 (0.9) | 24 (0.9) | 67 (2.6) | 120 (4.7) | 132 (5.2) | 156 (6.1) | 119 (4.7) | 124 (4.9) | 54 (2.1) | 24 (0.9) | 883 (34.6) |
| Average rainy days | 9.4 | 9.1 | 11.5 | 11.9 | 20.1 | 22.5 | 22.4 | 23.2 | 21.5 | 22.2 | 15.7 | 11.5 | 201 |
Source: Meteoblue

== Demographics ==
Population census of Kumalarang
| Year | Pop. | ±% p.a. |
|---|---|---|
| 1918 | 3,620 | — |
| 1960 | 6,366 | +1.35% |
| 1970 | 19,011 | +11.55% |
| 1975 | 24,093 | +4.87% |
| 1980 | 16,839 | −6.91% |
| 1990 | 20,928 | +2.20% |
| 1995 | 24,446 | +2.95% |
| 2000 | 24,926 | +0.42% |
| 2007 | 27,280 | +1.25% |
| 2010 | 28,210 | +1.23% |
| 2015 | 28,469 | +0.17% |
| 2020 | 29,479 | +0.74% |
| 2024 | 30,815 | +1.07% |
Source: Philippine Statistics Authority

== Economy ==
Poverty incidence of Kumalarang (%)

Source: Philippine Statistics Authority
