= 2010 Zamboanga Peninsula local elections =

Local elections were held in the Zamboanga Peninsula on May 10, 2010, as part of the 2010 Philippine general election.

== Zamboanga City ==
=== Mayor ===
Incumbent mayor Celso Lobregat of Laban ng Demokratikong Pilipino won re-election to a third term.

Candidate	Party	Votes	%
Celso Lobregat	Laban ng Demokratikong Pilipino	118,227	57.99
Mannix Dalipe	Nationalist People's Coalition	81,564	40.00
Abdilla Jamhali	Independent	2,258	1.11
Cleofe Carmelita Cajucom	Independent	1,843	0.90
Total		203,892	100.00
Valid votes		203,892	95.25
Invalid/blank votes		10,159	4.75
Total votes		214,051	100.00
Laban ng Demokratikong Pilipino hold			
Source: Commission on Elections

=== Vice mayor ===
Incumbent vice mayor Mannix Dalipe of the Nationalist People's Coalition ran for Mayor of Zamboanga City. Dalipe endorsed Crisanto dela Cruz of Lakas–Kampi–CMD, who was defeated by city councilor Cesar Iturralde of Laban ng Demokratikong Pilipino.

Candidate	Party	Votes	%
Cesar Iturralde	Laban ng Demokratikong Pilipino	78,827	40.29
Crisanto dela Cruz	Lakas–Kampi–CMD	45,330	23.17
Charlie Mariano	Aksyon Demokratiko	43,597	22.28
Roel Natividad	Citizens Call for Action Party	25,786	13.18
Arola Tingkong	Independent	1,372	0.70
Cresente Elemia	Philippine Green Republican Party	729	0.37
Total		195,641	100.00
Valid votes		195,641	91.40
Invalid/blank votes		18,410	8.60
Total votes		214,051	100.00
Laban ng Demokratikong Pilipino gain from Nationalist People's Coalition			
Source: Commission on Elections

=== City council ===
The Zamboanga City Council is composed of 19 councilors, 16 of whom are elected.

Party	Votes	%	Seats
Laban ng Demokratikong Pilipino	703,805	51.33	11
Nationalist People's Coalition	476,669	34.76	5
Aksyon Demokratiko	70,305	5.13	0
Citizens Call for Action Party	24,790	1.81	0
Philippine Green Republican Party	13,595	0.99	0
Independent	82,090	5.99	0
Total	1,371,254	100.00	16
Total votes	214,051	–	
Source: Commission on Elections

==== 1st District ====
Candidate	Party	Votes	%
Jaime Cabato	Laban ng Demokratikong Pilipino	62,042	8.55
Melchor Rey Sadain	Nationalist People's Coalition	58,733	8.09
Cesar Jimenez Jr.	Nationalist People's Coalition	56,355	7.77
Rodolfo Bayot	Nationalist People's Coalition	55,287	7.62
Rogelio Valesco	Laban ng Demokratikong Pilipino	54,117	7.46
Luis Biel III	Laban ng Demokratikong Pilipino	51,573	7.11
Rodolfo Lim	Laban ng Demokratikong Pilipino	48,091	6.63
Myra Paz Abubakar	Laban ng Demokratikong Pilipino	41,534	5.72
Josephine Pareja	Laban ng Demokratikong Pilipino	41,271	5.69
Kaiser Adan Olaso	Laban ng Demokratikong Pilipino	36,171	4.98
Henry Mariano	Aksyon Demokratiko	36,064	4.97
Elbert Atilano	Laban ng Demokratikong Pilipino	31,677	4.37
Jaime Rebollos	Aksyon Demokratiko	23,142	3.19
Abraham Sakandal	Nationalist People's Coalition	21,020	2.90
Allan Cajucom	Nationalist People's Coalition	18,269	2.52
Larry Silva	Nationalist People's Coalition	17,995	2.48
Joselito Bernardo	Nationalist People's Coalition	13,562	1.87
Manuel Fraginal Sr.	Aksyon Demokratiko	11,099	1.53
Eduardo Buendia	Independent	10,953	1.51
Luisito Lacson	Independent	9,426	1.30
Marlon Torres	Nationalist People's Coalition	9,221	1.27
Gerardo Fernandez	Independent	6,471	0.89
Abdurahman Tagayan	Independent	4,774	0.66
Wedito Cata-an	Philippine Green Republican Party	2,545	0.35
Erlinda Buñag	Philippine Green Republican Party	2,206	0.30
Estrella Paradillo	Philippine Green Republican Party	2,094	0.29
Total		725,692	100.00
Total votes		111,110	–
Source: Commission on Elections

==== 2nd District ====
Candidate	Party	Votes	%
Lila Nuño	Laban ng Demokratikong Pilipino	54,536	8.45
Benjamin Guingona III	Laban ng Demokratikong Pilipino	47,811	7.41
Eduardo Saavedra Jr.	Laban ng Demokratikong Pilipino	44,833	6.94
Reynerio Candido	Laban ng Demokratikong Pilipino	44,520	6.90
Rommel Agan	Nationalist People's Coalition	40,281	6.24
Percival Ramos	Laban ng Demokratikong Pilipino	37,731	5.84
Vincent Paul Elago	Laban ng Demokratikong Pilipino	36,693	5.68
Al-Jihan Edding	Nationalist People's Coalition	35,785	5.54
Miguel Alavar	Laban ng Demokratikong Pilipino	35,779	5.54
Roseller Natividad	Laban ng Demokratikong Pilipino	35,426	5.49
Susan de los Reyes	Nationalist People's Coalition	35,261	5.46
John Dalipe	Nationalist People's Coalition	33,560	5.20
Rene Natividad	Independent	30,533	4.73
Gerasimo Acuña	Nationalist People's Coalition	28,738	4.45
Jimmy Villaflores	Nationalist People's Coalition	25,652	3.97
Jose Manuel Fabian	Citizens Call for Action Party	14,662	2.27
Jerico Jan Bustamante	Nationalist People's Coalition	13,532	2.10
Efren Ramos	Nationalist People's Coalition	13,418	2.08
Resurreccion Miravite	Citizens Call for Action Party	10,128	1.57
Mujib Abdulmunib	Independent	7,288	1.13
Ambra Jamhali	Independent	4,486	0.69
Edjong Sattar	Philippine Green Republican Party	3,722	0.58
Taib Nasaron	Independent	3,155	0.49
Arnold Navarro	Philippine Green Republican Party	3,028	0.47
Ernesto Gadon	Independent	2,641	0.41
Jerry Tingkong	Independent	2,363	0.37
Total		645,562	100.00
Total votes		102,941	–
Source: Commission on Elections

== Zamboanga del Norte ==
=== Governor ===
Incumbent governor Rolando Yebes of Lakas–Kampi–CMD won re-election to a third term.

Candidate	Party	Votes	%
Rolando Yebes	Lakas–Kampi–CMD	216,004	57.00
Isagani Amatong	Liberal Party	148,192	39.11
Carlito Feras	Partido Demokratiko Sosyalista ng Pilipinas	9,354	2.47
Franklin Ubay	Independent	3,134	0.83
Bernardo Arboiz Jr.	Independent	1,303	0.34
Rogelio Gumanas	Independent	936	0.25
Total		378,923	100.00
Valid votes		378,923	87.61
Invalid/blank votes		53,571	12.39
Total votes		432,494	100.00
Lakas–Kampi–CMD hold			
Source: Commission on Elections

=== Vice governor ===
Incumbent vice governor Francis Olvis of Lakas–Kampi–CMD won re-election to a third term.

Candidate	Party	Votes	%
Francis Olvis	Lakas–Kampi–CMD	216,741	64.75
Roberto Pinsoy	Liberal Party	110,734	33.08
Elena Malanday	Independent	4,797	1.43
Maria Clara Señoron	Independent	2,458	0.73
Total		334,730	100.00
Valid votes		334,730	77.40
Invalid/blank votes		97,764	22.60
Total votes		432,494	100.00
Lakas–Kampi–CMD hold			
Source: Commission on Elections

=== Provincial board ===
The Zamboanga del Norte Provincial Board is composed of 13 board members, 10 of whom are elected.

Party	Votes	%	Seats
Lakas–Kampi–CMD	661,838	66.21	10
Liberal Party	256,614	25.67	0
Partido Demokratiko Sosyalista ng Pilipinas	2,218	0.22	0
Independent	79,006	7.90	0
Total	999,676	100.00	10
Total votes	432,494	–	
Source: Commission on Elections

==== 1st District ====
Candidate	Party	Votes	%
Fernando Cabigon Jr.	Lakas–Kampi–CMD	56,112	41.92
Jose Joy Olvis	Lakas–Kampi–CMD	50,221	37.52
Henry Adasa	Liberal Party	16,518	12.34
Lawrence Carin	Independent	11,016	8.23
Total		133,867	100.00
Total votes		103,724	–
Source: Commission on Elections

==== 2nd District ====
Candidate	Party	Votes	%
Michael Alan Ranillo	Lakas–Kampi–CMD	67,516	13.31
Uldarico Mejorada II	Lakas–Kampi–CMD	67,503	13.31
Cedric Adriatico	Lakas–Kampi–CMD	60,699	11.97
Edgar Baguio	Lakas–Kampi–CMD	56,510	11.14
Iñigo Yano Jr.	Liberal Party	56,039	11.05
Peter Co	Liberal Party	51,780	10.21
Adrian Michael Amatong	Liberal Party	50,819	10.02
Julius Napigquit	Liberal Party	49,706	9.80
Roseller Barinaga	Independent	37,201	7.33
Jay Raterta	Independent	2,230	0.44
Clayford Vailoces	Partido Demokratiko Sosyalista ng Pilipinas	2,218	0.44
Rudolph Roderick Bunao	Independent	2,193	0.43
Eufracio Bala Sr.	Independent	1,125	0.22
Puasito Malanday	Independent	935	0.18
Elmie Rivera	Independent	827	0.16
Total		507,301	100.00
Total votes		173,647	–
Source: Commission on Elections

==== 3rd District ====
Candidate	Party	Votes	%
Johanna Jalosjos	Lakas–Kampi–CMD	98,886	27.58
Anecito Darunday	Lakas–Kampi–CMD	77,851	21.72
Florentino Daarol	Lakas–Kampi–CMD	66,873	18.65
Romeo Cariño	Lakas–Kampi–CMD	59,667	16.64
Ayub Edgar Pia	Liberal Party	31,752	8.86
Alberto Dumangia	Independent	11,370	3.17
Gabriel Ates	Independent	4,779	1.33
Bartolome Gulane Sr.	Independent	4,085	1.14
Simplicia Pujanes	Independent	3,245	0.91
Total		358,508	100.00
Total votes		155,123	–
Source: Commission on Elections

== Zamboanga del Sur ==
=== Governor ===
Term-limited incumbent governor Aurora E. Cerilles of Lakas–Kampi–CMD ran for the House of Representatives in Zamboanga del Sur's 2nd district. Cerilles's husband, representative Antonio Cerilles of the Nationalist People's Coalition, won the election.

Candidate	Party	Votes	%
Antonio Cerilles	Nationalist People's Coalition	248,689	66.46
Roseller Ariosa	Liberal Party	125,481	33.54
Total		374,170	100.00
Valid votes		374,170	93.37
Invalid/blank votes		26,589	6.63
Total votes		400,759	100.00
Nationalist People's Coalition gain from Lakas–Kampi–CMD			
Source: Commission on Elections

=== Vice governor ===
Term-limited incumbent vice governor Roseller Ariosa of the Liberal Party ran for Governor of Zamboanga del Sur. The Liberal Party nominated Lakewood mayor Domingo Mirrar, who was defeated by Juan Regala of Lakas–Kampi–CMD.

Candidate	Party	Votes	%
Juan Regala	Lakas–Kampi–CMD	253,006	76.03
Domingo Mirrar	Liberal Party	79,784	23.97
Total		332,790	100.00
Valid votes		332,790	83.04
Invalid/blank votes		67,969	16.96
Total votes		400,759	100.00
Lakas–Kampi–CMD hold			
Source: Commission on Elections

=== Provincial board ===
The Zamboanga del Sur Provincial Board is composed of 13 board members, 10 of whom are elected.

Party	Votes	%	Seats
Lakas–Kampi–CMD	1,115,988	77.46	10
Liberal Party	309,361	21.47	0
Pwersa ng Masang Pilipino	10,903	0.76	0
Independent	4,400	0.31	0
Total	1,440,652	100.00	10
Total votes	400,759	–	
Source: Commission on Elections

==== 1st District ====
Candidate	Party	Votes	%
Ramon Blancia Jr.	Lakas–Kampi–CMD	131,787	15.48
Flaviano Fucoy	Lakas–Kampi–CMD	129,294	15.19
Rogelio Saniel	Lakas–Kampi–CMD	127,936	15.03
Ernesto Mondarte	Lakas–Kampi–CMD	122,795	14.42
Pepito Degamo	Lakas–Kampi–CMD	110,338	12.96
Maria Dinah Marasigan	Liberal Party	68,840	8.09
Cesaar Dacal	Liberal Party	45,835	5.38
Mario Fermindoza	Liberal Party	38,231	4.49
Glenn Eric Peralta	Liberal Party	36,251	4.26
Hope Florendo	Liberal Party	35,640	4.19
Pete Tria Jr.	Independent	4,400	0.52
Total		851,347	100.00
Total votes		239,075	–
Source: Commission on Elections

==== 2nd District ====
Candidate	Party	Votes	%
Wilfredo Asoy	Lakas–Kampi–CMD	104,174	17.68
Miguelito Ocapan	Lakas–Kampi–CMD	99,766	16.93
Edward Pintac	Lakas–Kampi–CMD	99,341	16.86
Vicente Cajeta	Lakas–Kampi–CMD	96,647	16.40
Eriberto Sumalinog	Lakas–Kampi–CMD	93,910	15.94
Andres Nacilla	Liberal Party	27,932	4.74
Emiliano Deleverio	Liberal Party	25,533	4.33
Lucas Leonardo Jr.	Liberal Party	16,659	2.83
Romulo Lumo	Liberal Party	14,440	2.45
Emercindo Fullo	Pwersa ng Masang Pilipino	10,903	1.85
Total		589,305	100.00
Total votes		161,684	–
Source: Commission on Elections

== Zamboanga Sibugay ==
=== Governor ===
Incumbent governor George Hofer of Lakas–Kampi–CMD was term-limited. Lakas–Kampi–CMD nominated Hofer's daughter, representative Dulce Ann Hofer, who was defeated by Rommel Jalosjos of the Nacionalista Party.

Candidate	Party	Votes	%
Rommel Jalosjos	Nacionalista Party	121,441	52.92
Dulce Ann Hofer	Lakas–Kampi–CMD	107,276	46.75
Lodrito Sabaiton	Independent	763	0.33
Total		229,480	100.00
Valid votes		229,480	94.52
Invalid/blank votes		13,315	5.48
Total votes		242,795	100.00
Nacionalista Party gain from Lakas–Kampi–CMD			
Source: Commission on Elections

=== Vice governor ===
Incumbent vice governor Rey Andre Olegario of the Nacionalista Party won re-election to a second term.

Candidate	Party	Votes	%
Rey Andre Olegario	Nacionalista Party	120,966	57.40
Juanito Gonzales	Lakas–Kampi–CMD	88,185	41.84
Rosalina Sadalla	Independent	1,594	0.76
Total		210,745	100.00
Valid votes		210,745	86.80
Invalid/blank votes		32,050	13.20
Total votes		242,795	100.00
Nacionalista Party hold			
Source: Commission on Elections

=== Provincial board ===
The Zamboanga Sibugay Provincial Board is composed of 13 board members, 10 of whom are elected.

Party	Votes	%	Seats
Nacionalista Party	471,622	57.45	9
Lakas–Kampi–CMD	264,168	32.18	1
Liberal Party	27,664	3.37	0
Bangon Pilipinas	3,354	0.41	0
Independent	54,139	6.59	0
Total	820,947	100.00	10
Total votes	242,795	–	
Source: Commission on Elections

==== 1st District ====
Candidate	Party	Votes	%
Cresencio Jore	Nacionalista Party	53,981	16.16
Eric Palma	Nacionalista Party	49,590	14.84
Abdusaid Ahiron	Nacionalista Party	47,364	14.18
Editha Caloñge	Nacionalista Party	46,986	14.06
Flordeliz Curiba	Nacionalista Party	39,921	11.95
Hairal Sakaluran	Lakas–Kampi–CMD	26,250	7.86
Teresita Famor	Lakas–Kampi–CMD	25,451	7.62
Ariel Yuayan	Lakas–Kampi–CMD	24,200	7.24
Bonifacio Suarez	Lakas–Kampi–CMD	20,329	6.09
Total		334,072	100.00
Total votes		104,726	–
Source: Commission on Elections

==== 2nd District ====
Candidate	Party	Votes	%
Eufemio Javier	Lakas–Kampi–CMD	54,314	11.16
Eric Cabarios	Nacionalista Party	52,152	10.71
Jose Abalde	Nacionalista Party	47,623	9.78
Joel Ebol	Nacionalista Party	44,513	9.14
Wilborne Danda	Nacionalista Party	37,062	7.61
Quirino Esguerra Jr.	Lakas–Kampi–CMD	35,499	7.29
Isagani Balladares	Lakas–Kampi–CMD	32,502	6.68
Saleh Dacula	Nacionalista Party	31,116	6.39
Jesus Sale	Lakas–Kampi–CMD	30,940	6.35
Dara May Cataluña	Independent	26,842	5.51
Gabriel Cainglet	Nacionalista Party	21,314	4.38
Valentino Inoferio Sr.	Liberal Party	20,820	4.28
Rodrigo Bellosillo	Lakas–Kampi–CMD	14,683	3.02
Ida Mel Caperig	Independent	14,022	2.88
Julieh Reza Gainsan	Liberal Party	6,844	1.41
Ibrahim Tarroza	Independent	4,820	0.99
Junieth Testa	Bangon Pilipinas	3,354	0.69
Gina Calanuga	Independent	2,474	0.51
Nena Alberto	Independent	2,036	0.42
Victorina Campaner	Independent	1,807	0.37
Sisinia Derla	Independent	1,127	0.23
Adelina Saria	Independent	1,011	0.21
Total		486,875	100.00
Total votes		138,069	–
Source: Commission on Elections
