= 2010 Philippine House of Representatives elections in the Zamboanga Peninsula =

Philippine House of Representatives elections in the Zamboanga Peninsula, 2010
- May 10, 2010

9 seats of Zamboanga Peninsula in the House of Representatives
	First party	Second party
Party	Lakas–Kampi	Liberal
Seats won	3	2
Popular vote	488,617	255,221
Percentage	41.40%	21.62%
	Third party	Fourth party
Party	NPC	Nacionalista
Seats won	1	3
Popular vote	225,614	173,607
Percentage	19.12%	14.71%
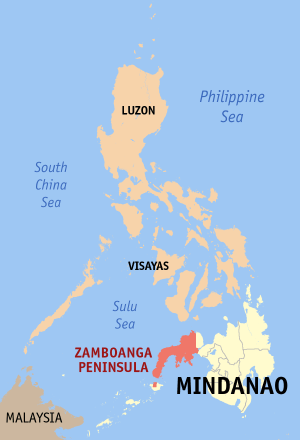
- Location of the Zamboanga Peninsula within the country.

Elections were held in the Zamboanga Peninsula for seats in the House of Representatives of the Philippines on May 10, 2010.

The candidate with the most votes won that district's seat for the 15th Congress of the Philippines.

Note that in Isabela, Basilan, although a part of this region, the voters elect their representative via Basilan's legislative district. Isabela is politically within Basilan despite being on separate regions.

== Summary ==
Party	Popular vote	%	Seats won
Lakas–Kampi	488,617	41.40%	3
Liberal	255,221	21.62%	2
NPC	225,614	19.12%	1
Nacionalista	173,607	14.71%	3
PDP–Laban	2,561	0.22%	0
PMP	1,905	0.16%	0
Independent	32,701	2.77%	0
Valid votes	1,180,226	91.48%	9
Invalid votes	109,873	8.52%	
Turnout	1,290,099	69.30%	
Registered voters	1,861,565	100.00%	

== Zamboanga City ==
=== 1st District ===
Beng Climaco is the incumbent.

Candidate	Party	Votes	%
Beng Climaco (incumbent)	Liberal Party	73,481	70.65
James Enriquez	Nationalist People's Coalition	28,625	27.52
Mhedy Entizar Gonzales	Pwersa ng Masang Pilipino	1,905	1.83
Total		104,011	100.00
Valid votes		104,011	93.61
Invalid/blank votes		7,099	6.39
Total votes		111,110	100.00
Liberal Party hold			
Source: Commission on Elections

=== 2nd District ===
Erbie Fabian is the incumbent.

Candidate	Party	Votes	%
Erbie Fabian (incumbent)	Nacionalista Party	55,454	59.28
Juan Climaco Elago II	Nationalist People's Coalition	34,202	36.56
Samuel Enesando	PDP–Laban	2,561	2.74
Sonny Sakilin	Independent	1,322	1.41
Total		93,539	100.00
Valid votes		93,539	90.87
Invalid/blank votes		9,402	9.13
Total votes		102,941	100.00
Nacionalista Party hold			
Source: Commission on Elections

== Zamboanga del Norte ==
=== 1st District ===
Cecilia Jalosjos-Carreon is retiring; her nephew provincial board member Seth Frederick Jalosjos is her party's nominee for the district's seat.

Candidate	Party	Votes	%
Bullet Jalosjos	Lakas–Kampi–CMD	74,946	81.12
Lex Adasa	Liberal Party	17,444	18.88
Total		92,390	100.00
Valid votes		92,390	89.07
Invalid/blank votes		11,334	10.93
Total votes		103,724	100.00
Lakas–Kampi–CMD hold			
Source: Commission on Elections

=== 2nd District ===
Rosendo Labadlabad is the incumbent.

Candidate	Party	Votes	%
Rosendo Labadlabad (incumbent)	Liberal Party	82,686	50.80
Ronald Yebes	Lakas–Kampi–CMD	77,926	47.88
Julito Feras	Independent	1,739	1.07
Nurolhadi Mendoza	Independent	417	0.26
Total		162,768	100.00
Valid votes		162,768	93.73
Invalid/blank votes		10,879	6.27
Total votes		173,647	100.00
Liberal Party hold			
Source: Commission on Elections

=== 3rd District ===
Cesar Jalosjos is the incumbent.

Candidate	Party	Votes	%
Cesar Jalosjos (incumbent)	Lakas–Kampi–CMD	108,163	79.39
Michael Documento Jr.	Independent	28,073	20.61
Total		136,236	100.00
Valid votes		136,236	87.82
Invalid/blank votes		18,887	12.18
Total votes		155,123	100.00
Lakas–Kampi–CMD hold			
Source: Commission on Elections

== Zamboanga del Sur ==
=== 1st District ===
Victor Yu is the incumbent.

Candidate	Party	Votes	%
Victor Yu (incumbent)	Nationalist People's Coalition	162,787	75.22
Romeo Vera Cruz	Liberal Party	53,634	24.78
Total		216,421	100.00
Valid votes		216,421	90.52
Invalid/blank votes		22,654	9.48
Total votes		239,075	100.00
Nationalist People's Coalition hold			
Source: Commission on Elections

=== 2nd District ===
Incumbent Antonio Cerilles will run for governor of Zamboanga del Sur. His wife three-term governor Aurora Enerio-Cerilles is his party's nominee for the district's seat.

Candidate	Party	Votes	%
Aurora E. Cerilles	Lakas–Kampi–CMD	120,933	81.46
Tirsendo Poloyapoy	Liberal Party	27,531	18.54
Total		148,464	100.00
Valid votes		148,464	91.82
Invalid/blank votes		13,220	8.18
Total votes		161,684	100.00
Lakas–Kampi–CMD hold			
Source: Commission on Elections

== Zamboanga Sibugay ==
=== 1st District ===
Incumbent Belma Cabilao is in third consecutive term already and is ineligible for reelection. His son, Jonathan Yambao runs under her party.

Candidate	Party	Votes	%
Jonathan Yambao	Nacionalista Party	52,244	54.45
Lycel Castor-Tan	Lakas–Kampi–CMD	43,156	44.98
Reynaldo Tecechian	Independent	555	0.58
Total		95,955	100.00
Valid votes		95,955	91.62
Invalid/blank votes		8,771	8.38
Total votes		104,726	100.00
Lakas–Kampi–CMD hold			
Source: Commission on Elections

=== 2nd District ===
Incumbent Dulce Ann Hofer will run for governor of Zamboanga Sibugay. Provincial administrator George Hofer II is her party's nominee for the district's seat.

Candidate	Party	Votes	%
Jon-jon Jalosjos	Nacionalista Party	65,909	50.53
George Hofer II	Lakas–Kampi–CMD	63,493	48.68
Moises Abellano Sr.	Independent	595	0.46
Noe Barbadillo	Liberal Party	445	0.34
Total		130,442	100.00
Valid votes		130,442	94.48
Invalid/blank votes		7,627	5.52
Total votes		138,069	100.00
Nacionalista Party gain from Lakas–Kampi–CMD			
Source: Commission on Elections
