= List of members of the House of Representatives of the Philippines (Y) =

This is a complete list of past and present members of the House of Representatives of the Philippines whose last names begin with the letter Y.

This list also includes members of the Philippine Assembly (1907–1916), the Commonwealth National Assembly (1935–1941), the Second Republic National Assembly (1943–1944) and the Batasang Pambansa (1978–1986).

== Ya ==
- Jonathan Yambao, member for Zamboanga Sibugay's 1st district (2010–2013)
- Brian Yamsuan, member for Bicol Saro party-list (2023–2025), and Parañaque's 2nd district (2025–present)
- Valeriano Yancha, member for Samar's 2nd district (1957–1961)
- Venancio Yaneza, member for Masbate (1984–1986)
- Manuel Yanson, member for Negros Occidental's 2nd district (1909–1912)
- Vicente Yanson, member for Negros Occidental's 2nd district (1922–1925, 1928–1931)
- Arthur C. Yap, member for Bohol's 3rd district (2010–2019), and Murang Kuryente party-list (2025–present)
- Christian Yap, member for Tarlac's 2nd district (2022–2025)
- Christopherson Yap, member for Southern Leyte's 2nd district (2022–present)
- Edvic Yap, member for ACT-CIS party-list (2022–2026)
- Eric Yap, member for ACT-CIS party-list (2019–2022), and Benguet (2022–2025, 2025–present)
- John Geesnell Yap, member for Bohol's 1st district (2025–present)
- Jose Yap, member for Tarlac's 2nd district (1965–1972, 1987–1998, 2007–2010)
- Melecio Yap Jr., member for Negros Occidental's 1st district (2016–2019)
- Renato Yap, member for Quezon City's 1st district (1987–1995)
- Susan Yap, member for Tarlac's 2nd district (2010–2016)
- Victor Yap, member for Tarlac's 2nd district (2016–2022)
- Antonio Yapha Jr., member for Cebu's 3rd district (1998–2007)
- Agaton Yaranon, member for La Union's 2nd district (1935–1938)
- Florabel Yatco, member for Nanay party-list (2025–present)

== Yb ==
- Julian Yballe, member for Region VII (1978–1984)
- Pacifico Ybañez, member for Leyte's 2nd district (1931–1934)
- Paulino Ybañez, member for Leyte's 2nd district (1925–1934)
- Fortunato Ybiernas, member for Iloilo (1943–1944)
- Vicente Ybiernas, member for Iloilo's 2nd district (1925–1928, 1931–1935), and Iloilo (1943–1944)

== Yl ==
- Perpetuo Ylagan, member for Romblon (2001–2004)

== Yn ==
- Mia Ynares, member for Rizal's 1st district (2025–present)

== Yñ ==
- Nicanor Yñiguez, member for Leyte's 3rd district (1957–1961), Southern Leyte (1961–1972, 1984–1986), and Region VIII (1978–1984)

== Yo ==
- Edith Yotoko-Villanueva, member for Negros Occidental's 3rd district (1998–2001)
- Joy Young, member for PROMDI party-list (1998–2001)

== Yu ==
- Divina Grace Yu, member for Zamboanga del Sur's 1st district (2016–2025)
- Joseph Yu, member for Zamboanga del Sur's 1st district (2025–present)
- Victoria Yu, member for Zamboanga del Sur's 2nd district (2022–present)
- Victor Yu, member for Zamboanga del Sur's 1st district (2007–2016)
- Dino Yulo, member for Negros Occidental's 5th district (2022–present)
- Emilio Yulo, member for Negros Occidental's 3rd district (1931–1934)
- José Yulo, member for Negros Occidental's 3rd district (1938–1941)
- Luis Yulo, member for Region IV-A (1978–1984), and Laguna (1984–1986)
- Mariano Yulo, member for Negros Occidental's 5th district (1987–1998)
- Georgilu Yumul-Hermida, member for Quezon's 4th district (2001–2004)
- Amado Yuzon, member for Pampanga's 1st district (1946–1949)
