= 2025 Philippine House of Representatives elections in the Zamboanga Peninsula =

- May 12, 2025
- All 11 Zamboanga Peninsula seats in the House of Representatives
Party	Seats	+/–
Lakas	6	+3
PFP	2	+2
AZAP	1	0
Liberal	1	0
Independent	1	+1
This lists parties that won seats. See the complete results below.

The 2025 Philippine House of Representatives elections in the Zamboanga Peninsula were held on May 12, 2025, as part of the 2025 Philippine general election.

== Summary ==
Congressional district	Incumbent	Incumbent's party	Winner	Winner's party	Winning margin
Sulu–1st	Samier Tan	Lakas	Samier Tan	Lakas	97.08%
Sulu–2nd	Munir Arbison Jr.	Lakas	Abdulmunir Arbison	Lakas	Unopposed
Zamboanga City–1st	Khymer Adan Olaso	Nacionalista	Kat Chua	Independent	0.67%
Zamboanga City–2nd	Mannix Dalipe	Lakas	Jerry Perez	AZAP	17.94%
Zamboanga del Norte–1st	Pinpin Uy	Lakas	Pinpin Uy	Lakas	21.87%
Zamboanga del Norte–2nd	Glona Labadlabad	Lakas	Irene Labadlabad	Lakas	45.48%
Zamboanga del Norte–3rd	Ian Amatong	Liberal	Ian Amatong	Liberal	26.56%
Zamboanga del Sur–1st	Divina Grace Yu	Lakas	Joseph Yu	Lakas	16.64%
Zamboanga del Sur–2nd	Victoria Yu	Lakas	Victoria Yu	Lakas	10.00%
Zamboanga Sibugay–1st	Wilter Palma	Lakas	Marlo Bancoro	PFP	11.96%
Zamboanga Sibugay–2nd	Antonieta Eudela	Lakas	Marly Hofer–Hasim	PFP	11.08%

== Sulu ==
=== 1st district ===
2025 Sulu's 1st congressional district election
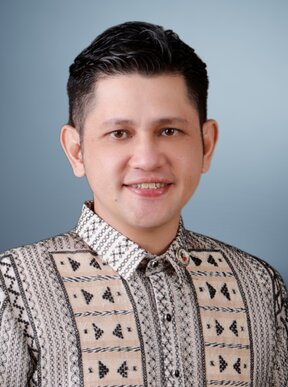
		IND
Candidate	Samier Tan	Bensaudi Tulawie
Party	Lakas	Independent
Popular vote	204,178	2,520
Percentage	98.29%	1.21%
House representative before election
Samier Tan
Lakas
Elected House representative
Samier Tan
Lakas

Incumbent Samier Tan of Lakas–CMD ran for a third term.

Tan won re-election against former representative Bensaudi Tulawie (Independent) and Mhar Mudjilon (Independent).

Candidate	Party	Votes	%
Samier Tan (incumbent)	Lakas–CMD	204,178	98.29
Bensaudi Tulawie	Independent	2,520	1.21
Mhar Mudjilon	Independent	1,033	0.50
Total		207,731	100.00
Valid votes		207,731	93.13
Invalid/blank votes		15,330	6.87
Total votes		223,061	100.00
Registered voters/turnout		262,367	85.02
Lakas hold			
Source: Commission on Elections

=== 2nd district ===
2025 Sulu's 2nd congressional district election
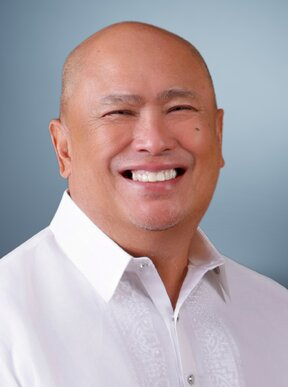
Candidate	Abdulmunir Arbison
Party	Lakas
Popular vote	151,548
Percentage	100.00%
House representative before election
Munir Arbison Jr.
Lakas
Elected House representative
Abdulmunir Arbison
Lakas

Incumbent Munir Arbison Jr. of Lakas–CMD ran for a second term as a nominee of the Kapuso PM party-list.

Lakas–CMD nominated Arbison's father, former representative Abdulmunir Arbison, who won the election unopposed.

Candidate	Party	Votes	%
Abdulmunir Arbison	Lakas–CMD	151,548	100.00
Total		151,548	100.00
Valid votes		151,548	87.83
Invalid/blank votes		20,995	12.17
Total votes		172,543	100.00
Registered voters/turnout		202,026	85.41
Lakas hold			
Source: Commission on Elections

== Zamboanga City ==
=== 1st district ===
Incumbent Khymer Adan Olaso of the Nacionalista Party retired to run for mayor of Zamboanga City.

The Nacionalista Party nominated Olaso's brother, Kaiser Adan Olaso, who was defeated by Kat Chua, an independent. Zamboanga City vice mayor Pinpin Pareja (Lakas–CMD) and Al Abduhalim (Independent) also ran for representative.

Candidate	Party	Votes	%
Kat Chua	Independent	54,444	34.53
Pinpin Pareja	Lakas–CMD	53,381	33.86
Kaiser Adan Olaso	Nacionalista Party	46,706	29.62
Al Abduhalim	Independent	3,140	1.99
Total		157,671	100.00
Valid votes		157,671	92.25
Invalid/blank votes		13,255	7.75
Total votes		170,926	100.00
Registered voters/turnout		224,316	76.20
Independent gain from Nacionalista			
Source: Commission on Elections

=== 2nd district ===
Term-limited incumbent Mannix Dalipe of Lakas–CMD ran for mayor of Zamboanga City.

Lakas–CMD nominated Dalipe's brother, Zamboanga City mayor John Dalipe, who was defeated by Zamboanga City Liga ng mga Barangay president Jerry Perez of the Adelante Zamboanga Party. Three other candidates also ran for representative.

Candidate	Party	Votes	%
Jerry Perez	Adelante Zamboanga Party	100,035	53.93
John Dalipe	Lakas–CMD	66,763	35.99
Michelle Natividad	PDP–Laban	15,639	8.43
Darlene Sali	Independent	1,594	0.86
Ander Ismael	Independent	1,473	0.79
Total		185,504	100.00
Valid votes		185,504	92.06
Invalid/blank votes		16,003	7.94
Total votes		201,507	100.00
Registered voters/turnout		258,742	77.88
AZAP gain from Lakas			
Source: Commission on Elections

== Zamboanga del Norte ==
=== 1st district ===
2025 Zamboanga del Norte's 1st congressional district election
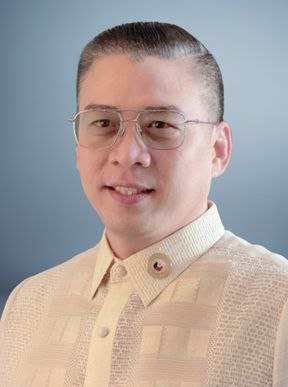
		NP
Candidate	Pinpin Uy	Cely Carreon
Party	Lakas	Nacionalista
Popular vote	92,806	58,043
Percentage	58.40%	36.53%
Representative before election
Pinpin Uy
Lakas
Elected Representative
Pinpin Uy
Lakas

Incumbent Pinpin Uy of Lakas–CMD ran for a full term. Elected in 2022 under PDP–Laban, Uy was only able to take office on November 13, 2023, due to a controversy over the election result.

Uy won re-election against Piñan mayor Cely Carreon (Nacionalista Party) and two other candidates.

Candidate	Party	Votes	%
Pinpin Uy (incumbent)	Lakas–CMD	92,806	58.40
Cely Carreon	Nacionalista Party	58,043	36.53
Jan Jalosjos	Nationalist People's Coalition	6,441	4.05
Cay Carreon	Partido para sa Demokratikong Reporma	1,620	1.02
Total		158,910	100.00
Valid votes		158,910	93.22
Invalid/blank votes		11,552	6.78
Total votes		170,462	100.00
Registered voters/turnout		189,224	90.08
Lakas hold			
Source: Commission on Elections

=== 2nd district ===
Term-limited incumbent Glona Labadlabad of Lakas–CMD ran for mayor of Sindangan. She was previously affiliated with PDP–Laban.

Lakas–CMD nominated Labadlabad's daughter, Irene Labadlabad, who won the election against Tata Monteclaro (Nacionalista Party).

Candidate	Party	Votes	%
Irene Labadlabad	Lakas–CMD	165,985	72.74
Tata Monteclaro	Nacionalista Party	62,220	27.26
Total		228,205	100.00
Valid votes		228,205	90.76
Invalid/blank votes		23,225	9.24
Total votes		251,430	100.00
Registered voters/turnout		309,959	81.12
Lakas hold			
Source: Commission on Elections

=== 3rd district ===
Incumbent Ian Amatong of the Liberal Party ran for a second term.

Amatong won re-election against former representative Cesar Jalosjos (Nacionalista Party).

Candidate	Party	Votes	%
Ian Amatong (incumbent)	Liberal Party	129,731	63.28
Cesar Jalosjos	Nacionalista Party	75,271	36.72
Total		205,002	100.00
Valid votes		205,002	87.87
Invalid/blank votes		28,292	12.13
Total votes		233,294	100.00
Registered voters/turnout		281,357	82.92
Liberal hold			
Source: Commission on Elections

== Zamboanga del Sur ==
=== 1st district ===
Term-limited incumbent Divina Grace Yu of Lakas–CMD ran for governor of Zamboanga del Sur. She was previously affiliated with PDP–Laban.

Lakas–CMD nominated Yu's son, Joseph Yu, who won the election against Labangan mayor Eddie Relacion (Nationalist People's Coalition).

Candidate	Party	Votes	%
Joseph Yu	Lakas–CMD	190,907	58.32
Eddie Relacion	Nationalist People's Coalition	136,415	41.68
Total		327,322	100.00
Valid votes		327,322	89.88
Invalid/blank votes		36,874	10.12
Total votes		364,196	100.00
Registered voters/turnout		429,807	84.73
Lakas hold			
Source: Commission on Elections

=== 2nd district ===
Incumbent Victoria Yu of Lakas–CMD ran for a second term. She was previously affiliated with PDP–Laban.

Yu won the election against former representative Aurora E. Cerilles (Nationalist People's Coalition).

Candidate	Party	Votes	%
Victoria Yu (incumbent)	Lakas–CMD	125,668	55.00
Aurora E. Cerilles	Nationalist People's Coalition	102,804	45.00
Total		228,472	100.00
Valid votes		228,472	95.68
Invalid/blank votes		10,315	4.32
Total votes		238,787	100.00
Registered voters/turnout		283,148	84.33
Lakas hold			
Source: Commission on Elections

== Zamboanga Sibugay ==
=== 1st district ===
2025 Zamboanga Sibugay's 1st congressional district election
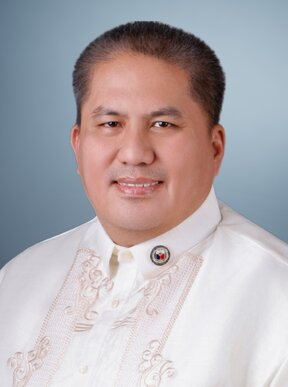

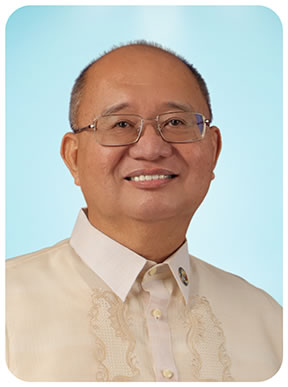
Candidate	Marlo Bancoro	Wilter Palma
Party	PFP	Lakas
Popular vote	81,915	64,415
Percentage	55.98%	44.02%
House representative before election
Wilter Palma
Lakas
Elected House representative
Marlo Bancoro
PFP

Incumbent Wilter Palma of Lakas–CMD ran for a second term.

Palma was defeated by provincial board member Marlo Bancoro of Partido Federal ng Pilipinas.

Candidate	Party	Votes	%
Marlo Bancoro	Partido Federal ng Pilipinas	81,915	55.98
Wilter Palma (incumbent)	Lakas–CMD	64,415	44.02
Total		146,330	100.00
Valid votes		146,330	96.61
Invalid/blank votes		5,128	3.39
Total votes		151,458	100.00
Registered voters/turnout		179,359	84.44
PFP gain from Lakas			
Source: Commission on Elections

=== 2nd district ===
2025 Zamboanga Sibugay's 2nd congressional district election
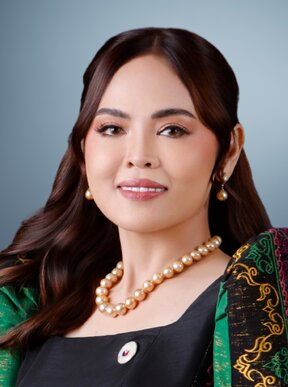

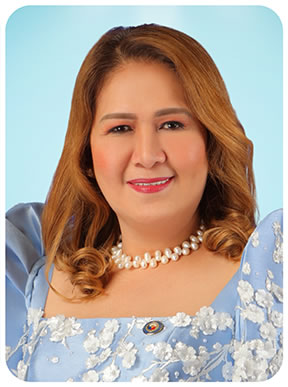
			PDP
Candidate	Marly Hofer-Hasim	Antonieta Eudela	Jarjar Acosta
Party	PFP	Lakas	PDP–Laban
Popular vote	92,835	71,823	22,108
Percentage	48.95%	37.87%	11.66%
House representative before election
Antonieta Eudela
Lakas
Elected House representative
Marly Hofer-Hasim
PFP

Incumbent Antonieta Eudela of Lakas–CMD ran for a second term.

Eudela was defeated by Marly Hofer-Hasim of Partido Federal ng Pilipinas. Siay mayor Jarjar Acosta (PDP–Laban), Naga mayor Rino delos Reyes (Independent) and two other candidates also ran for representative.

Candidate	Party	Votes	%
Marly Hofer-Hasim	Partido Federal ng Pilipinas	92,835	48.95
Antonieta Eudela (incumbent)	Lakas–CMD	71,823	37.87
Jarjar Acosta	PDP–Laban	22,108	11.66
Rino delos Reyes	Independent	2,607	1.37
Jose Gerosa	Independent	167	0.09
Al-Sharief Muloc	Independent	122	0.06
Total		189,662	100.00
Valid votes		189,662	91.84
Invalid/blank votes		16,855	8.16
Total votes		206,517	100.00
Registered voters/turnout		249,063	82.92
PFP gain from Lakas			
Source: Commission on Elections
