= 2016 Philippine House of Representatives elections in the Zamboanga Peninsula =

Elections will be held in Zamboanga Peninsula for seats in the House of Representatives of the Philippines on May 9, 2016.

== Summary ==
Party	Popular vote	%	Swing	Seats won	Change
Aksyon					
KBL					
LDP					
Liberal					
Nacionalista					
NPC					
NUP					
PBM					
PDP–Laban					
Independent					
Valid votes					
Invalid votes					
Turnout					
Registered voters					

== Zamboanga City ==
Each of Zamboanga City's two legislative districts will elect each representative to the House of Representatives. The candidate with the highest number of votes wins the seat.

=== 1st District ===
Celso Lobregat is the incumbent.

2016 Philippine House of Representatives election at Zamboanga City's 1st district
Party	Candidate	Votes	%
LDP	Celso Lobregat	62,218	52.5
NPC	Crisanto "Monsi" Dela Cruz	36,150	30.3
Independent	Cesar Climaco	15,540	13.0
Independent	Abdulbasir Yasin "Deejay" Tamsilani	2,881	2.4
PDP–Laban	Taib Nasaron	1,872	1.6
Independent	Elmer Pangan	372	0.3
PBM	Anito Tilos	145	0.1
Total votes			

=== 2nd District ===
Lilia Macrohon-Nuño is the incumbent.

2016 Philippine House of Representatives election at Zamboanga City's 2nd district
Party	Candidate	Votes	%
NPC	Manuel Jose Dalipe	69,100	55.3
Nacionalista	Lilia Macrohon-Nuño	48,497	39.2
PDP–Laban	Abdul Karim Ladjamatli	3,983	3.2
PBM	Abu Bakar Barahama	2,973	2.4
Total votes			

== Zamboanga del Norte ==
Each of Zamboanga del Norte's three legislative districts will elect each representative to the House of Representatives. The candidate with the highest number of votes wins the seat.

=== 1st District ===
Seth Frederick Jalosjos is the incumbent.

2016 Philippine House of Representatives election at Zamboanga del Norte's 1st District
Party	Candidate	Votes	%
NUP	Vicente Edgar Balisado		
Nacionalista	Seth Frederick Jalosjos		
Liberal	Lester Ong		
Total votes			

=== 2nd District ===
Rosendo S. Labadlabad is the incumbent but ineligible for reelection. His party nominated his wife, Glona Labadlabad.

2016 Philippine House of Representatives election at Zamboanga del Norte's 2nd District
Party	Candidate	Votes	%
Nacionalista	Gilbert Cruz		
Liberal	Glona Labadlabad		
Total votes			

=== 3rd District ===
Isagani S. Amatong is the incumbent.

2016 Philippine House of Representatives election at Zamboanga del Norte's 3rd District
Party	Candidate	Votes	%
Liberal	Isagani Amatong		
Independent	Joshua Baroro		
Independent	Ednu-Sajar Hambali		
Nacionalista	Cesar Jalosjos		
Independent	Popoy Tumagidgid		
Total votes			

== Zamboanga del Sur ==
Each of Zamboanga del Sur's two legislative districts will elect each representative to the House of Representatives. The candidate with the highest number of votes wins the seat.

=== 1st District ===
Victor Yu is the incumbent, but ineligible for reelection. His party nominated his wife, Divina Grace Yu.

2016 Philippine House of Representatives election at Zamboanga del Sur's 1st District
Party	Candidate	Votes	%
NPC	Divina Grace Yu	180,705	83.00
NUP	Alex Acain	37,000	17.00
Total votes		217,705	

=== 2nd District ===
Aurora Enerio-Cerilles is the incumbent.

2016 Philippine House of Representatives election at Zamboanga del Sur's 2nd District
Party	Candidate	Votes	%
NPC	Aurora Enerio-Cerilles	117,658	92.31
Aksyon	James Yecyec	9,805	7.69
Total votes		127,463	

== Zamboanga Sibugay ==
Each of Zamboanga Sibugay's two legislative districts will elect each representative to the House of Representatives. The candidate with the highest number of votes wins the seat.

=== 1st District ===
Belma Cabilao is the incumbent.

2016 Philippine House of Representatives election at Zamboanga Sibugay's 1st District
Party	Candidate	Votes	%
Liberal	Wilter Palma II	49,342	
Nacionalista	Belma Cabilao	42,417	
KBL	Omar Karim	1,241	
Independent	Eric Dalis	412	
Independent	Reynaldo Telechian	371	
Total votes			

=== 2nd District ===
Dulce Ann Hofer is the incumbent.

2016 Philippine House of Representatives election at Zamboanga Sibugay's 2nd District
Party	Candidate	Votes	%
Liberal	Dulce Ann Hofer	119,175	
PDP–Laban	Edgar Alegre	7,043	
Total votes			
