= Tabina =

Municipality in Zamboanga del Sur, Philippines

- Municipality
- Municipality of Tabina
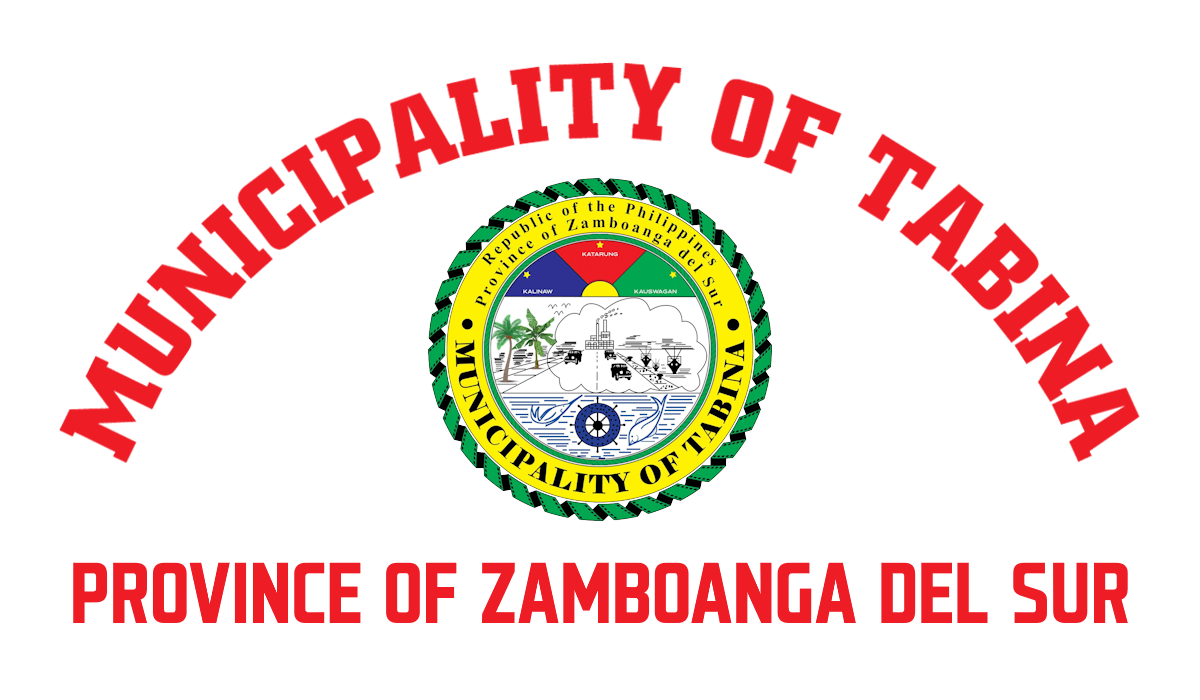
- Flag Seal

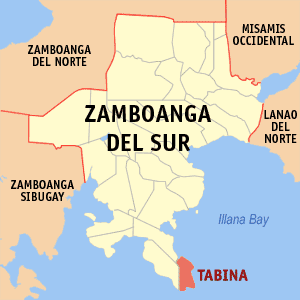
- Map of Zamboanga del Sur with Tabina highlighted
- Interactive map of Tabina
- Location within the Philippines
- Coordinates: 7°27′56″N 123°24′31″E
- Country: Philippines
- Region: Zamboanga Peninsula
- Province: Zamboanga del Sur
- District: 2nd district
- Barangays: 15 (see Barangays)

Government
  - Type: Sangguniang Bayan
  - Mayor: Juhaine “Bader” A. Malaco
  - Vice Mayor: Clydelyn Poloyapoy-Pablo
  - Representative: Jeyzel Victoria C. Yu
  - Municipal Council: Members: Hon. Alex Aldie Amores; Hon. Jemboy Capundag; Hon. Franklin Rodriguez; Hon. Robert Bernal; Hon. Baby Jean Saligan; Hon. Bimbo Anito; Hon. Tata Albaño Jr.; Hon. Jaime Allones
  - Electorate: 17,195 voters (2025)

Area
  - Total: 86.90 km^{2} (33.55 sq mi)
- Elevation: 55 m (180 ft)
- Highest elevation: 307 m (1,007 ft)
- Lowest elevation: 0 m (0 ft)

Population (2024 census)
  - Total: 24,591
  - Density: 283.0/km^{2} (732.9/sq mi)
  - Households: 5,736

Economy
  - Income class: 3rd municipal income class
  - Poverty incidence: 40.8% (2023)
  - Revenue: ₱ 144.8 million (2024)
  - Assets: ₱ 419 million (2024)
  - Expenditure: ₱ 47.97 million (2024)
  - Liabilities: ₱ 85.33 million (2024)

Service provider
  - Electricity: Zamboanga del Sur 1 Electric Cooperative (ZAMSURECO 1)
- Time zone: UTC+8 (PST)
- ZIP code: 7034
- PSGC: 0907327000
- IDD : area code: +63 (0)62
- Native languages: Subanon; Cebuano; Chavacano; Tagalog; Maguindanaon
- Website: www.zds-tabina.gov.ph

Tabina, officially the Municipality of Tabina (Cebuano: Lungsod sa Tabina; Subanen: Benwa Tabina; Maguindanaon: Inged nu Tabina, Jawi: ايڠد نو تبين; Chavacano: Municipalidad de Tabina; Tagalog: Bayan ng Tabina), is a municipality in the province of Zamboanga del Sur, Philippines. According to the 2024 census, it has a population of 24,591 people.

== History ==
Tabina was formed out of the Municipality of Dimataling on August 16, 1961, by virtue of Executive Order No. 443 signed by President Carlos P. Garcia. Upon its creation, Tabina has twelve (12) barangays which comprised its original territory.

4 new barangays (Capisan, Doña Josefina, New Oroquita, San Francisco) were later created. When the Municipality of Pitogo was created, barangay Limbayan was detached from the Municipality of Tabina to be added to the new municipality, thus, resulting in a total number of fifteen (15) barangays within its jurisdiction.

Historically, the earliest settlers of Tabina were the Subanens who have settled in the different parts of the Zamboanga Peninsula. They are followed by the Muslims, and then the Christians. The name itself has many different origins, open to interpretation. One states that it comes from the inhabitants’ expression of “tabi-una”, a polite expression meaning “excuse me”. Another points out to the inhabitants' characteristic expression of being talkative which, in the local tongue, is being “tabi-an”. Meanwhile, the Muslim immigrants were said to be attracted by the abundance of local seashells known as “binga” in their native tongue. It also happened to be called “ubina”. The Christians who happened to pass by Tabina inquired about the name of the place and, always hearing “bina”, modified it to “Tabina” and the name has stuck ever since. Most of Tabina is characterized as having steep mountains and undulating hills. The majority of the barangays tower to about 50 to 200 feet above sea level. There are no coastal plains or valleys in the municipality; the coasts themselves run down to shores and high cliffs. There are several tourist attractions in Tabina as well. There's the Tambunan Beach and Marine Sanctuary, the Barangay Malim and Marine Sanctuary, Talisay Beach, and the Pod-ok Mangrove Boardwalk.

== Geography ==
It is the southernmost part of Zamboanga del Sur, facing the area wherein the waters of Illana Bay flows out to the Moro Gulf. It is about 63 kilometers away from Pagadian City, the province's capital. Its boundaries are the municipality of Dimataling on the north, the Celebes Sea on the south, the municipality of Pitogo on the west, and another body of water, Illana Bay, on the east. Tabina can be reached via land through a provincial road passing through five municipalities so those who are thinking of going to Tabina should prepare for a long journey through rural places. The municipality has a land area of 8,690 hectares and these are distributed to the municipality's current 15 regular and de facto barangays.

=== Climate ===
Climate data for Tabina, Zamboanga del Sur
Month	Jan	Feb	Mar	Apr	May	Jun	Jul	Aug	Sep	Oct	Nov	Dec	Year
Mean daily maximum °C (°F)	31 (88)	31 (88)	32 (90)	32 (90)	31 (88)	30 (86)	29 (84)	29 (84)	29 (84)	29 (84)	30 (86)	31 (88)	30 (87)
Mean daily minimum °C (°F)	21 (70)	22 (72)	22 (72)	23 (73)	24 (75)	24 (75)	24 (75)	24 (75)	24 (75)	24 (75)	23 (73)	22 (72)	23 (74)
Average precipitation mm (inches)	22 (0.9)	18 (0.7)	23 (0.9)	24 (0.9)	67 (2.6)	120 (4.7)	132 (5.2)	156 (6.1)	119 (4.7)	124 (4.9)	54 (2.1)	24 (0.9)	883 (34.6)
Average rainy days	9.4	9.1	11.5	11.9	20.1	22.5	22.4	23.2	21.5	22.2	15.7	11.5	201
Source: Meteoblue

=== Barangays ===
Tabina is politically subdivided into 16 barangays. Each barangay consists of puroks while some have sitios.

- Abong-abong
- Baganian
- Baya-baya
- Capisan
- Concepcion
- Culabay
- Doña Josefina
- Lumbia
- Mabuhay
- Malim
- Manicaan
- New Oroquieta
- Poblacion
- San Francisco
- Tultolan

== Demographics ==
Population census of Tabina
Year	Pop.	±% p.a.
1970	11,364	—
1975	14,099	+4.42%
1980	15,190	+1.50%
1990	19,422	+2.49%
1995	20,210	+0.75%
2000	21,882	+1.72%
2007	23,798	+1.16%
2010	24,110	+0.48%
2015	25,061	+0.74%
2020	25,734	+0.56%
2024	24,591	−1.08%
Source: Philippine Statistics Authority

== Economy ==
Poverty incidence of Tabina

Source: Philippine Statistics Authority

== Education ==
Tertiary

- Josefina E. Cerilles State College (Tabina Campus)

Secondary

(Private)

- Saint Ambrose High School

(Public)

- Baganian National High School
- Concepcion National High School
- Culabay National High School
- Malim National High School
- Tabina National High School
- Tultolan National High School

Elementary

- Abong-Abong Elementary School
- Baganian Elementary School
- Capisan Elementary School
- Concepcion Elementary School
- Culabay Elementary School
- Lumbia Elementary School
- Mabuhay Elementary School
- Malim Elementary School
- San Antonio Elementary School (Baganian)
- San Francisco Elementary School
- San Roque Elementary School
- Tabina Central Elementary School
- Santo Domingo Elementary School (Malim)

== Tourism ==
- Tambunan Beach and Marine Sanctuary
- Talisay Beach and Barangay Malim Marine Sanctuary
- Pod-ok Mangrove Boardwalk
- Baliti Beach Resort
- Baganian Beach Resort

== Gallery ==
More Views
