= Joseph Yu =

Filipino politician (born 1998)

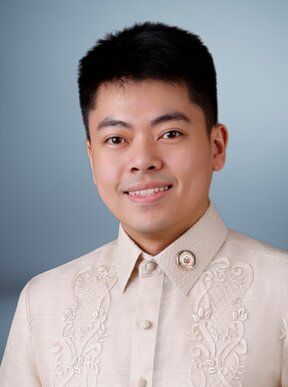
- Official portrait, 2025

Member of the House of Representatives for Zamboanga del Sur's 1st district
- Incumbent
- Assumed office June 30, 2025
- Preceded by: Divina Grace Yu

Personal details
- Born: August 20, 1998 (age 27) Pagadian, Zamboanga del Sur, Philippines
- Party: Lakas (2024–present)
- Parents: Victor Yu (father); Divina Grace Yu (mother)
- Relatives: Victoria Yu (sister)

Joseph Kim Cabardo Yu (born August 20, 1998) is a Filipino businessman and politician serving as a member of the House of Representatives for Zamboanga del Sur's 1st congressional district since 2025.

== Personal life ==
Yu was born on August 20, 1998 in Pagadian in the province of Zamboanga del Sur. He is the child of former Governor of Zamboanga del Sur, Victor Yu and current Governor, Divina Grace Yu. He is the younger brother of incumbent representative, Victoria Yu of Zamboanga del Sur's 2nd congressional district.

== Electoral history ==
Electoral history of Joseph Yu
Year	Office	Party	Votes received				Result	Ref.
Year	Office	Party	Total	%	P.	Swing	Result	Ref.
2025	Representative (Zamboanga del Sur–1st)	Lakas	190,907	58.32%	1st	—N/a	Won	
