= Victoria Yu =

Filipino politician (born 1996)

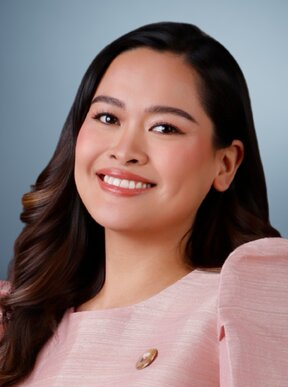
- Official portrait, 2025

Member of the House of Representatives of the Philippines for Zamboanga del Sur's 2nd district
- Incumbent
- Assumed office June 30, 2022
- Preceded by: Leonardo Babasa Jr.

Personal details
- Born: Jeyzel Victoria Cabardo Yu; September 5, 1996 (age 30) Cagayan de Oro, Philippines
- Party: Lakas (2024–present)
- Other political affiliations: PDP–Laban (2021–2024)
- Parents: Victor Yu (father); Divina Grace Yu (mother)
- Relatives: Joseph Yu (brother)
- Education: University of the Philippines Los Baños (BS)

Jeyzel Victoria Cabardo Yu (born September 5, 1996) is a Filipino politician who is a member of the House of Representatives for Zamboanga del Sur's 2nd congressional district since 2022.

== Personal life ==
Yu was born on September 5, 1996 in Cagayan de Oro in the province of Misamis Oriental. She is the child of then former Governor of Zamboanga del Sur, Victor Yu and current Governor, Divina Grace Yu. She is also the older sister of incumbent representative, Joseph Yu of Zamboanga del Sur's 1st congressional district.

== Educational background ==
Yu graduated from The University of the Philippines Los Baños as an undergraduate and her secondary school is The Zamboanga del Sur National High School.

== Political career ==
Yu ran for Representative of Zamboanga del Sur's 2nd district under PDP-Laban (now PDP) during the 2022 elections and successfully defeated incumbent Leonardo Babasa Jr. of Lakas–CMD. Yu ran for re-election under Lakas–CMD during the 2025 elections and won.

== Electoral history ==
Electoral history of Victoria Yu
Year	Office	Party	Votes received				Result	Ref.
Year	Office	Party	Total	%	P.	Swing	Result	Ref.
2022	Representative (Zamboanga del Sur–2nd)	PDP–Laban	104,055	49.04%	1st	—N/a	Won	
2025	Representative (Zamboanga del Sur–2nd)	Lakas	125,668	55.00%	1st	—N/a	Won	

== See also ==
- List of female members of the House of Representatives of the Philippines
- 19th Congress of the Philippines
