= Zamboanga del Sur Provincial Board =

Legislative body of the province of Zamboanga del Sur, Philippines

Zamboanga del Sur Provincial Board Sangguniang Panlalawigan ng Zamboanga del Sur

Type
- Type: Unicameral
- Term limits: 3 terms (9 years)

Leadership
- Presiding Officer: Roseller Ariosa, PFP since June 30, 2019

Structure
- Seats: 13 board members 1 ex officio presiding officer
- Political groups: PFP (4) Lakas (4) UNA (2) Nonpartisan (2)
- Length of term: 3 years
- Authority: Local Government Code of the Philippines

Elections
- Voting system: Multiple non-transferable vote (regular members); Indirect election (ex officio members); Acclamation (sectoral member)
- Last election: May 13, 2019
- Next election: May 9, 2022

Meeting place
- Legislative Building, Zamboanga del Sur Provincial Complex, Pagadian

The Zamboanga del Sur Provincial Board is the Sangguniang Panlalawigan (provincial legislature) of the Philippine province of Zamboanga del Sur.

The members are elected via plurality-at-large voting: the province is divided into two districts, each having five seats. A voter votes up to five names, with the top five candidates per district being elected. The vice governor is the ex officio presiding officer, and only votes to break ties. The vice governor is elected via the plurality voting system province-wide.

The districts used in appropriation of members is coextensive with the legislative districts of Zamboanga del Sur.

Aside from the regular members, the board also includes the provincial federation presidents of the Liga ng mga Barangay (ABC, from its old name "Association of Barangay Captains"), the Sangguniang Kabataan (SK, youth councils) and the Philippine Councilors League (PCL).

== Apportionment ==
Elections	Seats per district		Ex officio seats	Total seats
Elections	1st	2nd	Ex officio seats	Total seats
2010–present	5	5	3	13

== List of members ==
=== Current members ===
These are the members after the 2025 local elections and 2018 barangay and SK elections:

- Vice Governor: Roseller L. Ariosa (PFP)

Seat	Board member	Party	Start of term	End of term
1st district	Jaqueline Michelle S. Espina-Villanueva	PFP	June 30, 2025	June 30, 2028
1st district	Bienvenido L. Ebarle	PFP	June 30, 2022	June 30, 2028
1st district	Almado C. Sanoria	Lakas	June 30, 2025	June 30, 2028
1st district	Francisvic S. Villamero	Lakas	June 30, 2019	June 30, 2028
1st district	Rogelio J. Saniel	UNA	June 30, 2019	June 30, 2028
2nd district	Juan C. Regala	UNA	June 30, 2019	June 30, 2028
2nd district	Ronaldo C. Poloyapoy	PFP	June 30, 2019	June 30, 2028
2nd district	Hernan P. Dela Cruz	PFP	June 30, 2022	June 30, 2028
2nd district	Jenifer D. Mariano	Lakas	June 30, 2019	June 30, 2028
2nd district	Marilou V. Abrenica	Lakas	June 30, 2022	June 30, 2028
ABC	Roel A. Amban	Nonpartisan	November 30, 2023	November 30, 2026
PCL		TBA		
SK	Shaner U. Mambang	Nonpartisan	November 30, 2023	November 30, 2026

== Past members ==
=== Vice governor ===
Election year	Name	Party	Ref.
2001	Roseller L. Ariosa		
2004	Roseller L. Ariosa	NPC	
2007	Roseller L. Ariosa	Lakas	
2010	Juan C. Regala	Lakas–Kampi	
2013	Juan C. Regala	NPC	
2016	Ace William E. Cerilles	Liberal	
2019	Roseller L. Ariosa	UNA	
2022	Roseller L. Ariosa	PDP–Laban	
2025	Roseller L. Ariosa	PFP	

=== 1st district ===
- Population (2024):

Election year	Member (party)	Member (party)	Member (party)	Member (party)	Member (party)	Ref.
2013	Joaquin G. Pajares (NPC)	Ramon O. Blancia, Jr. (NPC)	Jesus B. Bajamunde, Jr. (NPC)	Pepito B. Degamo (NPC)	Eduardo D. Relacion (NPC)	
2016	Mario H. Cerilles (Liberal)	Roque M. Yamba (Liberal)	Ma. Fe M. Pitogo (Liberal)	Pepito B. Degamo (NPC)	Hipolita Marilyn G. Pajares (NPC)	
2019	Baldomero Fernandez (PDP–Laban)	Cesar C. Dacal, Jr. (PDP–Laban)	Francisvic S. Villamero (PDP–Laban)	Almado C. Sanoria (NUP)	Rogelio J. Saniel (UNA)	
2022	Maphilindo Q. Mapi (PDDS)	Cesar C. Dacal, Jr. (PDP–Laban)	Francisvic S. Villamero (PDP–Laban)	Bienvenido L. Ebarle (Independent)	Rogelio J. Saniel (UNA)	
2025	Jaqueline Michelle S. Espina-Villanueva (PFP)	Almado C. Sanoria (Lakas)	Francisvic S. Villamero (Lakas)	Bienvenido L. Ebarle (PFP)	Rogelio J. Saniel (UNA)	

=== 2nd district ===
- Population (2024):

Election year	Member (party)	Member (party)	Member (party)	Member (party)	Member (party)	Ref.
2013	Edward B. Pintac (NPC)	Vicente P. Cajeta (NPC)	Felicidad B. Funtanilla (NPC)	Edilberto S. Adlaon (NPC)	Miguelito T. Ocapan (NPC)	
2016	Edward B. Pintac (NPC)	Vicente P. Cajeta (NPC)	Edilberto S. Adlaon (NPC)	Belman B. Mantos (Liberal)	Junetine M. Lanzaderas (Liberal)	
2019	Juan C. Regala (PDP–Laban)	Basilio Vidad (PDP–Laban)	Raul F. Famor (PDP–Laban)	Ronaldo C. Poloyapoy (PDP–Laban)	Jenifer D. Mariano (PDP–Laban)	
2022	Juan C. Regala (UNA)	Marilou V. Abrenica (PDP–Laban)	Hernan P. Dela Cruz (PDDS)	Ronaldo C. Poloyapoy (PPP)	Jenifer D. Mariano (PDP–Laban)	
2025	Juan C. Regala (UNA)	Marilou V. Abrenica (Lakas)	Hernan P. Dela Cruz (PFP)	Ronaldo C. Poloyapoy (PFP)	Jenifer D. Mariano (Lakas)	
