= Rommel Jalosjos =

Filipino politician and businessman (born 1973)

2nd Governor of Zamboanga Sibugay
- In office June 30, 2010 – June 30, 2013
- Vice Governor: Rey Andre Olegario
- Preceded by: George Hofer
- Succeeded by: Wilter Palma Sr.

Personal details
- Born: Rommel Apolinario Jalosjos; October 26, 1973 (age 52) Quezon City, Philippines
- Citizenship: Australia (renounced in 2009); Philippines
- Party: Nacionalista (2009–2012; 2021–present)
- Other political affiliations: Independent (2015–2021); APP (2012–2015)
- Relations: Rosalina (aunt); Romeo Jr. (half-brother); Seth Frederick (half-brother); Lana (half-sister)
- Parent: Romeo Sr. (father)
- Occupation: Politician and businessman

Rommel Apolinario Jalosjos (born October 26, 1973) is a Filipino former politician and businessman who served as the 2nd Governor of Zamboanga Sibugay from his election in 2010 until his re-election defeat in 2013 by Wilter Palma.

== Early life ==
Rommel Apolinario Jalosjos was born on October 26, 1973, in Quezon City, Philippines but migrated to Australia in 1981 when he was eight years old and later acquired Australian citizenship. On November 22, 2008, Jalosjos moved to Ipil, Zamboanga Sibugay, Philippines and lived with his brother Romeo Jr., four days later Jalosjos took an oath of allegiance to the Philippines and renounced his Australian citizenship on September 1, 2009, in compliance with the Republic Act (R.A.) 9225.

=== Voter registration issue ===
Jalosjos applied for voter registration in his municipality but respondent and barangay captain Dan Erasmo opposed the application but the Election Registration Board approved it and included Jalosjos's name in the Commission on Elections's voters list. Erasmo filed a petition for the exclusion of Jalosjos's name from the voters list but it got denied.

== Political career ==
=== Jalosjos v. Comelec ===
On November 28, 2009, Jalosjos filed his certificate of candidacy (COC) for Governor of Zamboanga Sibugay in the 2010 Philippine general election. Erasmo filed a petition once again to cancel Jalosjos's COC claiming that he failed to comply with R.A. 9225 and the one-year residency requirement of the Local Government Code to run for governor. After hearing, the second division of COMELEC ruled that while Jalosjos regained Philippine citizenship by complying with R.A 9225 but failed to present ample proof of a bona fide intention to establish his domicile in Ipil. On the motion of reconsideration, the COMELEC En Banc affirmed the second division's decision and disqualified him, ruling that Jalosjos had been a mere guest in his brother's home and cannot claim Ipil as his domicile. The supreme court resolved this on May 7, 2010, to issue a status quo ante order, instructing the COMELEC from enforcing its decision. On August 8, 2012, the supreme court junked the case allowing Jalosjos to run for the governorship.

=== Governor of Zamboanga Sibugay (2010-2013) ===
Jalosjos won the election for Governor under the Nacionalista Party defeating house representative and the daughter of his predecessor George Hofer, Dulce Ann. Jalosjos won this election along with his brother Romeo who defeated the son of George Hofer for house representative. In 2011, the Moro National Liberation Front (MILF) accused Jalosjos of blocking an investigation by an international panel of a clash between the forces of government and MILF guerrillas in Payao last October. Jalosjos ran again for re-election to a second term during the 2013 Philippine general election but lost to Diplahan mayor Wilter Palma of the Liberal Party. On July 1 of that year, Jalosjos said he was leaving politics "for good" and will not seek any position in any upcoming election, Jalosjos said he would try to convince his father to let him leave politics and withdraw the electoral protest against the Liberal Party that Jalosjos himself filed, Jalosjos said withdrawing the electoral protest would calm down the tensions.

=== Failed combacks in 2016 and 2022 ===
Jalosjos ran for Vice Governor of Zamboanga Sibugay as an independent during the 2016 Philippine general election but lost.

On October 8, 2021, Jalosjos filed his certificate of candidacy for Mayor of Dipolog during the 2022 Zamboanga del Norte local elections under the Nacionalista Party again promising big change in the next seven months if elected, but Jalosjos lost to incumbent mayor Darel Uy.

== Personal life ==
Jalosjos is a member of the Jalosjos dynasty of Zamboanga del Norte and formerly in Zamboanga Sibugay. He is the son of former representative of Zamboanga del Norte's 1st congressional district and convicted child rapist Romeo "Nonong" Jalosjos Sr. He is also the nephew of siblings former Governor of Zamboanga del Norte Rosalina and former representative of Cesar Jalosjos. His half siblings are former representative Romeo "Jon-jon" Jr., former Dapitan mayor Seth Frederick "Bullet", TV host and Baliangao Mayor Lana, and former Liga ng mga Barangay president Sushmita.

Political offices
Preceded by George Hofer	Governor of Zamboanga Sibugay; 2010-2013	Succeeded by Wilter Y. Palma
