= Antonio Cerilles =

Filipino politician (born 1948)

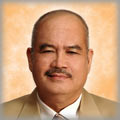
- Official portrait, 2007

Presidential Adviser for Mindanao Concerns
- Incumbent
- Assumed office March 13, 2025
- President: Bongbong Marcos

14th Governor of Zamboanga del Sur
- In office June 30, 2010 – June 30, 2019
- Vice Governor: Juan Regala (2010–2016); Ace William E. Cerilles (2016–2019)
- Preceded by: Aurora Enerio-Cerilles
- Succeeded by: Victor Yu

Secretary of Environment and Natural Resources
- In office July 1, 1998 – January 20, 2001
- President: Joseph Estrada
- Preceded by: Victor Ramos
- Succeeded by: Joemari Gerochi (acting)

Member of the Philippine House of Representatives from Zamboanga del Sur's 2nd district
- In office June 30, 2004 – June 30, 2010
- Preceded by: Nenet San Juan
- Succeeded by: Aurora Enerio-Cerilles
- In office June 30, 1987 – June 30, 1998
- Preceded by: Position established
- Succeeded by: Aurora Enerio-Cerilles

Personal details
- Born: Antonio Herrera Cerilles; October 7, 1948 (age 77) Manila, Philippines
- Party: NPC (1992-2007; 2009-present)
- Other political affiliations: Lakas–CMD (2007-2009); Nacionalista (1987-1992)
- Spouse: Aurora Enerio
- Children: Ace William E. Cerilles
- Education: University of Santo Tomas; University of the East

Antonio "Tony" Herrera Cerilles (born October 7, 1948) is a former Governor of Zamboanga del Sur, Philippines, from June 30, 2010, until June 30, 2019.

Prior to the governorship, he was a member of the House of Representatives of the Philippines as the representative of the second district of Zamboanga del Sur. He was succeeded in Congress by his wife Aurora Enerio-Cerilles as congressman who also preceded him in the governorship of the province. He also served as the Secretary of Department of Environment and Natural Resources during the tenure of then Philippine President Joseph Estrada from 1998 to 2001.

== Early life ==
Cerilles was born on October 7, 1948, in Manila to Vicente Cerilles and Josefina Herrera. He earned his Bachelor of Arts degree in Political Science from University of Santo Tomas in 1968 and his Bachelor of Laws degree from University of the East in 1972.

He is an active member of Alpha Phi Omega fraternity. He was the National President of JCI Senate Philippines 2012. He is also the National Senior Vice President of the Boy Scouts of the Philippines and the current Council Chairman of BSP Zamboanga del Sur-Pagadian City Council. He is also a member of various organizations including the Knights of Columbus, Council 8188 and the Parliamentary Government Foundation.

== Career in the House of Representatives ==
Before being elected as a congressman, Cerilles was elected as a Regional Assemblyman of the Sanguniang Pampook of Region X, Zamboanga City from 1982 to 1987. He was elected as the representative of the second district of Zamboanga del Sur in 1987, 1992 and 1995. Among the laws he authored during this stint was House Bill No. 3950 now Republic Act No. 6975 otherwise known as the "Department of the Interior and Local Government Act of 1990," which established the Philippine National Police under a Reorganized Department of the Interior and Local Government and House Bill No. 9347 now Republic Act No. 8047 otherwise known as the "Book Publishing Industry Development Act," which formulated and implemented a National Book Policy and a National Book Development Plan. After serving as DENR Secretary from 1998–2001, he was elected again as a representative in 2004. He was one of the signatories of House Resolution 1109 calling for a constituent assembly to amend the Constitution.

== Governor of Zamboanga del Sur (2010–2019) ==
Antonio H. Cerilles served three consecutive terms as the 14th Governor of Zamboanga del Sur from June 30, 2010, to June 30, 2019, succeeding his wife, Aurora Enerio‑Cerilles, and was succeeded by Victor Yu. During his governorship, Cerilles focused on regional development and strengthening peace and order initiatives, leveraging his long career across local and national government. He maintained political influence through his family, with his wife and son holding key local positions.

== Philippine House of Representatives campaign (2019) ==
In the 2019 elections, Cerilles ran for a congressional seat representing Zamboanga del Sur’s 2nd district but was defeated by Mayor Leonardo L. Babasa, Jr. This reversed the electoral success of his wife, Aurora, who had succeeded him as district representative.

== Presidential Adviser for Mindanao Concerns (since 2025) ==
On March 13, 2025, President Bongbong Marcos appointed Cerilles as Presidential Adviser for Mindanao Concerns. In this capacity, he is tasked with advising on socio-economic development, peace and security, and the ongoing government transition in the Bangsamoro.

In May 2025, Cerilles announced plans to open a satellite office in Cagayan de Oro, aiming to strengthen direct communication between the Office of the President and local governance structures across Mindanao alongside the Mindanao Development Authority.

== Honors ==
A classroom inside Dalupan Building at University of the East in Manila was renamed Secretary Antonio H. Cerilles Chamber being an alumnus of the UE College of Law.

Government offices
Preceded by Victor A. Ramos	Secretary of Environment and Natural Resources; 1998 – 2001	Succeeded by Joemari D. Gerochi as Acting Secretary of Environment and Natural Resources
New office	Presidential Adviser for Mindanao Concerns; 2025–present	Incumbent
House of Representatives of the Philippines
New seat	Member of the House of Representatives from the 2nd Legislative district of Zamboanga del Sur; 1987–1998	Succeeded by Aurora E. Cerilles
Preceded by Filomena L. San Juan	Member of the House of Representatives from the 2nd Legislative district of Zamboanga del Sur; 2004–2010	Succeeded by Aurora E. Cerilles
Political offices
Preceded by Aurora E. Cerilles	Governor of Zamboanga del Sur; 2010–2019	Succeeded by Victor Yu
