= Aurora E. Cerilles =

Filipino politician

The Honorable Aurora E. Cerilles
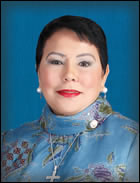

Member of the Philippine House of Representatives from Zamboanga del Sur's 2nd District
- In office June 30, 2010 – June 30, 2019
- Preceded by: Antonio Cerilles
- Succeeded by: Leonardo L. Babasa, Jr.
- In office June 30, 1998 – June 30, 2001
- Preceded by: Antonio Cerilles
- Succeeded by: Nenet S. San Juan

13th Governor of Zamboanga del Sur
- In office June 30, 2001 – June 30, 2010
- Vice Governor: Roseller Ariosa
- Preceded by: Isidoro E. Real, Jr.
- Succeeded by: Antonio Cerilles

First Lady of Zamboanga del Sur
- In role June 30, 2010 – June 30, 2019
- Governor: Antonio Cerilles
- Preceded by: Antonio Cerilles (as First Gentlemen)
- Succeeded by: Divina Grace Yu

Personal details
- Born: Aurora Cavan Enerio November 17, 1949 (age 76) Oroquieta City, Misamis Occidental, Philippines
- Party: NPC (2001–2007; 2012–2018; 2024–present)
- Other political affiliations: Nacionalista (2018–2024); Lakas–CMD (2008–2012); KAMPI (2007–2008); LAMMP (1998–2001)
- Spouse: Antonio Cerilles
- Children: Ace William Enerio Cerilles

Aurora "Auring" Cerilles (born Aurora Cavan Enerio; September 17, 1949) is a Filipino politician. She was a former representative of the second (2nd) legislative district of the Province of Zamboanga del Sur to the House of Representatives of the Philippines. She is the spouse of Antonio Cerilles, governor of Zamboanga del Sur from 2010 to 2019. She switched positions with her husband and ran for governor during the 2019 elections, but lost by almost 100,000 votes to former representative Victor Yu of PDP Laban.

== Early life ==
She was born on September 17, 1949, to former representative Canuto M.S. Enerio and former vice governor Vicenta C. Enerio.

== Education ==
She graduated from University of the East with a BS in business administration.

== See also ==
- List of current Philippine provincial governors
- List of representatives elected in the 2010 Philippine House of Representatives election

Political offices
Preceded by Isidro E. Real, Jr.	Governor of Zamboanga del Sur; 2001-2010	Succeeded by Antonio H. Cerilles
House of Representatives of the Philippines
Preceded by Antonio H. Cerilles	Member of the House of Representatives from the 2nd Legislative districts of Zamboanga del Sur; 1998–2001	Succeeded by Filomena S. San Juan
Preceded by Antonio H. Cerilles	Member of the House of Representatives from the 2nd Legislative districts of Zamboanga del Sur; 2010–2019	Succeeded by Leandro L. Babasa, Jr.
