= Divina Grace Yu =

Filipino politician

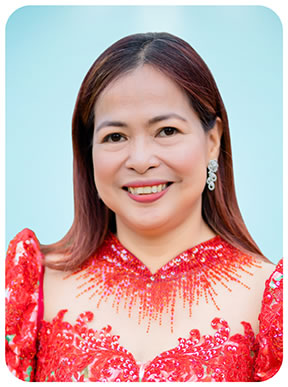
- Yu during the 19th Congress

16th Governor of Zamboanga del Sur
- Incumbent
- Assumed office June 30, 2025
- Vice Governor: Roseller Ariosa
- Preceded by: Victor Yu

Deputy Speaker of the House of Representatives
- In office December 7, 2020 – June 1, 2022
- House Speaker: Lord Allan Velasco

Member of the Philippine House of Representatives from Zamboanga del Sur's First District
- In office June 30, 2016 – June 30, 2025
- Preceded by: Victor Yu
- Succeeded by: Joseph Yu

Vice Mayor of Pagadian
- In office June 30, 2013 – June 30, 2016
- Mayor: Romeo Pulmones
- Preceded by: Romeo Pulmones
- Succeeded by: Ernesto Mondarte

First Lady of Zamboanga del Sur
- In role June 30, 2019 – June 30, 2025
- Governor: Victor Yu
- Preceded by: Aurora Cerilles
- Succeeded by: Victor Yu (as First Gentleman)

Personal details
- Born: Divina Grace Cabardo; April 21, 1974 (age 52) Pagadian, Zamboanga del Sur, Philippines
- Party: Lakas (2023–present)
- Other political affiliations: PDP-Laban (2017–2023); NPC (2012–2017)
- Spouse: Victor Yu
- Children: 3, including Victoria and Joseph
- Education: Saint Columban College (BS)

Divina Grace Yu (née Cabardo; born April 21, 1974) is a Filipino politician who served as the representative of the first district of Zamboanga del Sur from 2016 to 2025. She previously served as city vice mayor of Pagadian.

== Early life and education ==
Divina Grace Cabardo Yu was born in Pagadian, Philippines, on 21 April 1974, as the youngest of six children of Eliseo and Jesusa Cabardo. She was educated at Balintawak Elementary School and Zamboanga del Sur National High School. She graduated from Saint Columban College with a Bachelor of Science degree in accounting in 1995.

== Political career ==
In 2013, Yu made her run for vice mayor of Pagadian alongside Romeo "Tata" Pulmones under the Nationalist People's Coalition, defeating Romeo Vera Cruz of the Liberal Party.

=== House of Representatives ===
In the 17th Congress, Yu was the chairperson of the House Committee on the Welfare of Children. In the 18th Congress, she was one of the vice chairpersons of the House Committee on Accounts; one of the vice chairpersons of the Committee on Inter-Parliamentary Relations and Diplomacy; and sits in as member of the House Committees on Ecology, Appropriations, and Disaster Resilience. On July 10, 2020, along with 70 other members of Congress, Yu voted to reject the franchise renewal of ABS-CBN. Since December 7, 2020, Yu serves as one of the House deputy speakers under the leadership of House Speaker Lord Allan Velasco.

In December 2023, Yu left PDP-Laban to join the Lakas–CMD party. On February 5, 2025, Yu was among the 95 Lakas–CMD members who voted to impeach vice president Sara Duterte.

== Electoral history ==
Electoral history of Divina Grace Yu
Year	Office	Party	Votes received				Result	Ref.
Year	Office	Party	Total	%	P.	Swing	Result	Ref.
2013	Vice Mayor of Pagadian	NPC	40,100	50.38%	1st	—N/a	Won	
2016	Representative (Zamboanga del Sur–1st)	NPC	180,705	83.00%	1st	—N/a	Won	
2019	Representative (Zamboanga del Sur–1st)	PDP–Laban	164,990	—N/a	1st	—N/a	Won	
2022	Representative (Zamboanga del Sur–1st)	PDP–Laban	166,432	52.89%	1st	—N/a	Won	
2025	Governor of Zamboanga del Sur	Lakas	320,389	56.07%	1st	—N/a	Won	

House of Representatives of the Philippines
Preceded by Victor Yu	Member of the House of Representatives from the 1st legislative district of Zamboanga del Sur; 2016-2025	Succeeded by Victoria Yu
Political offices
Preceded by Victor Yu	Governor of Zamboanga del Sur; 2025-present	Incumbent
Preceded by Romeo Pulmones	Vice Mayor of Pagadian; 2013-2016	Succeeded by Ernesto Mondarte
