= Zamboanga del Sur =

- Province
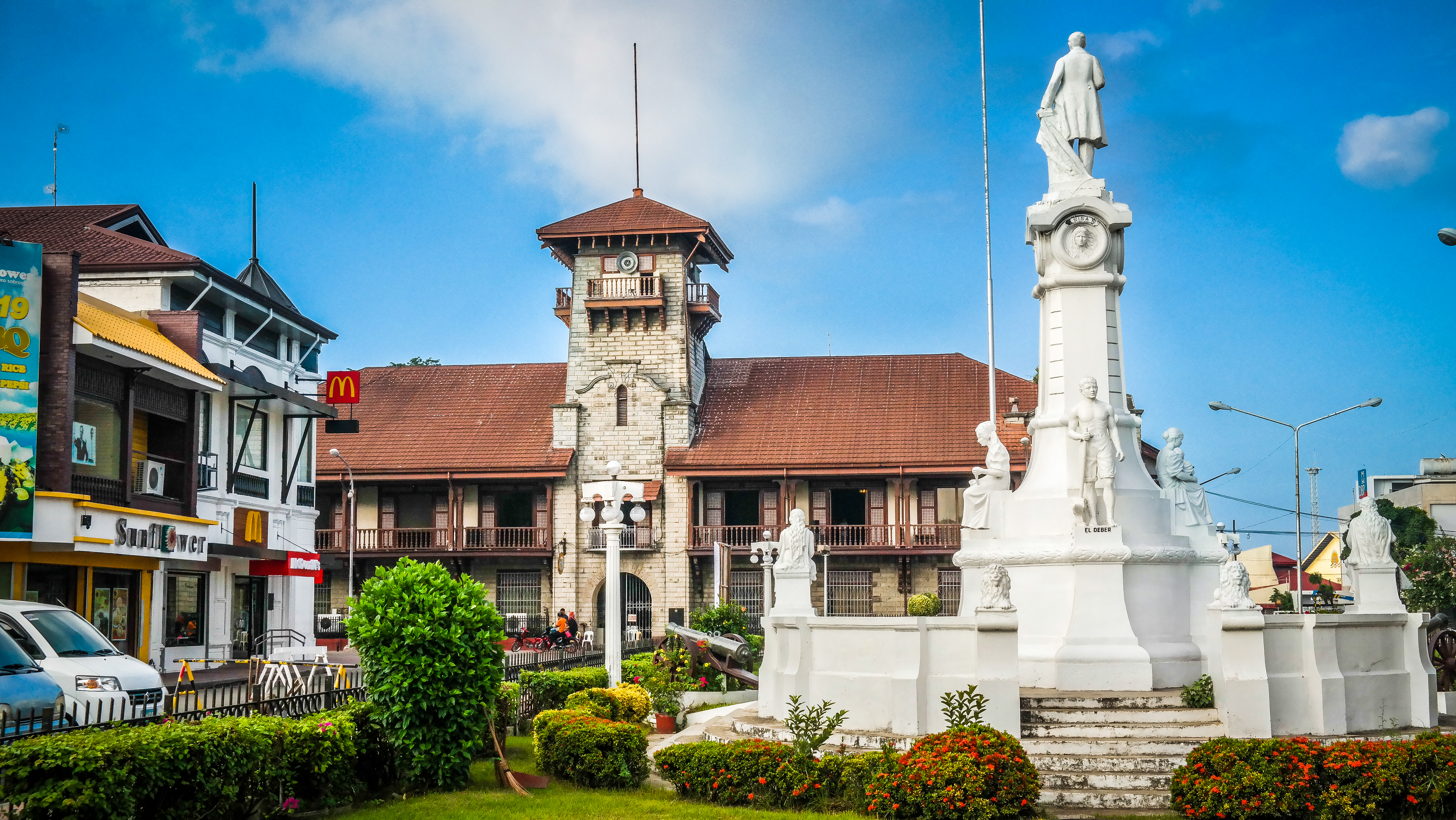
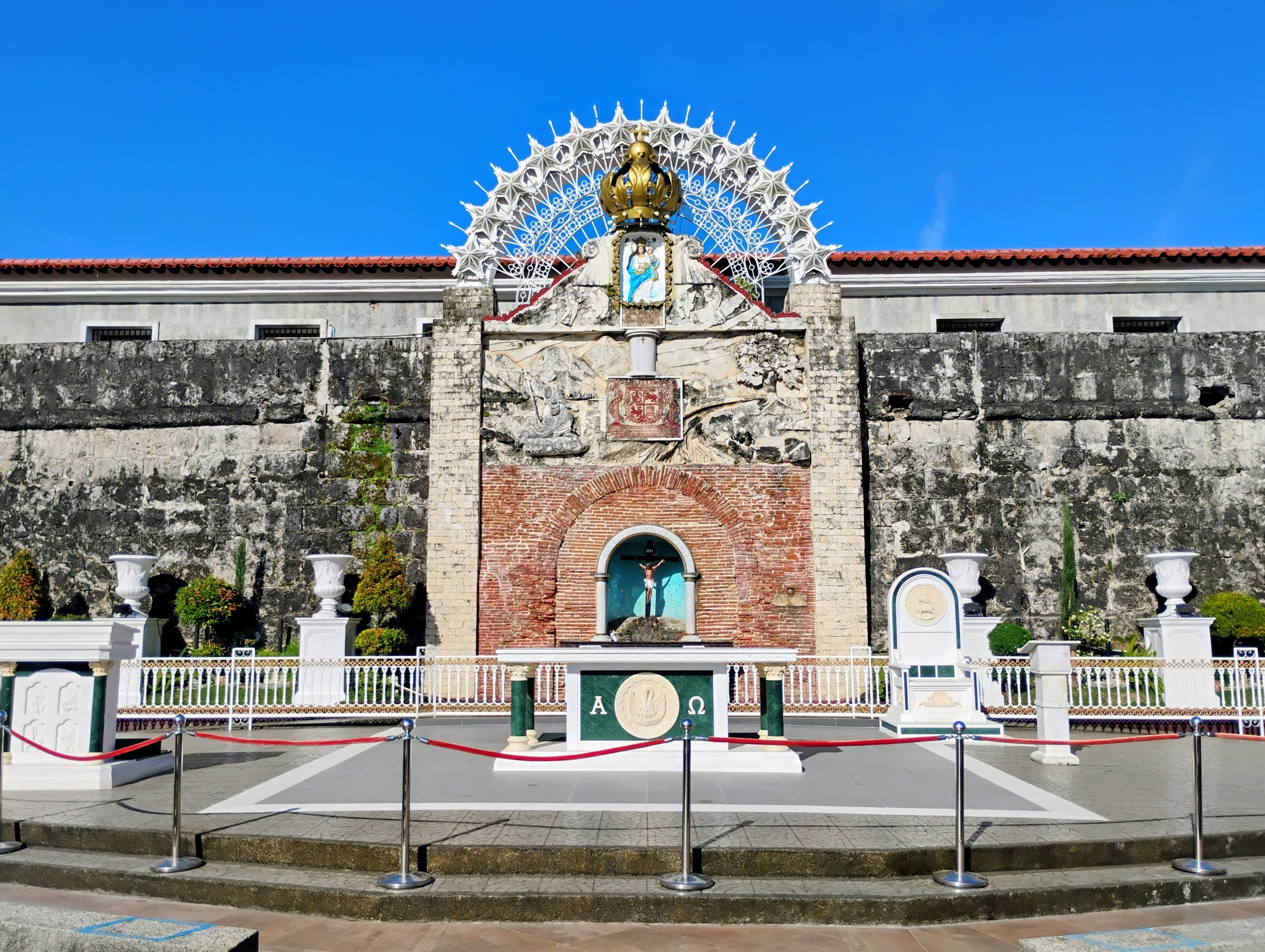
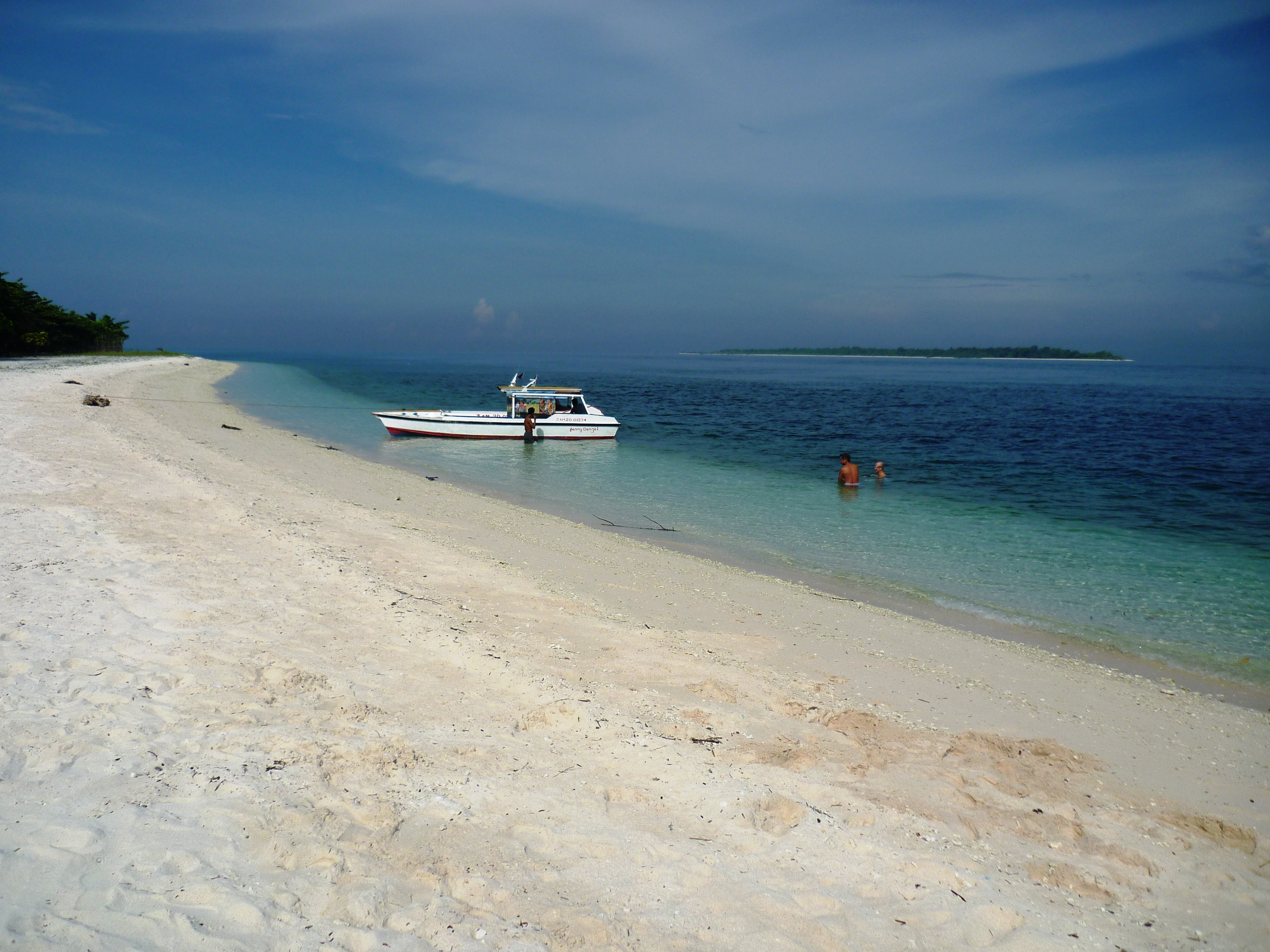
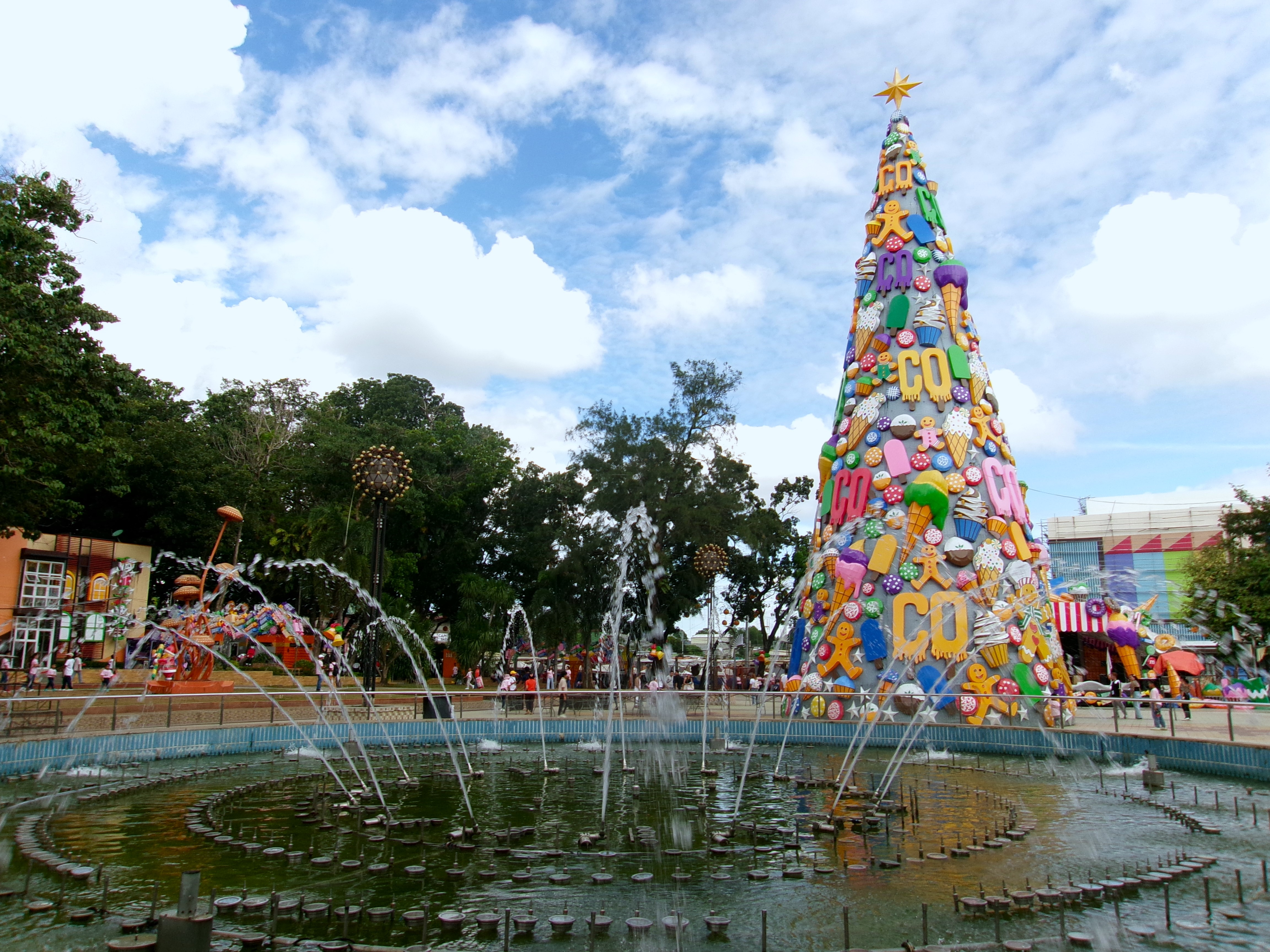
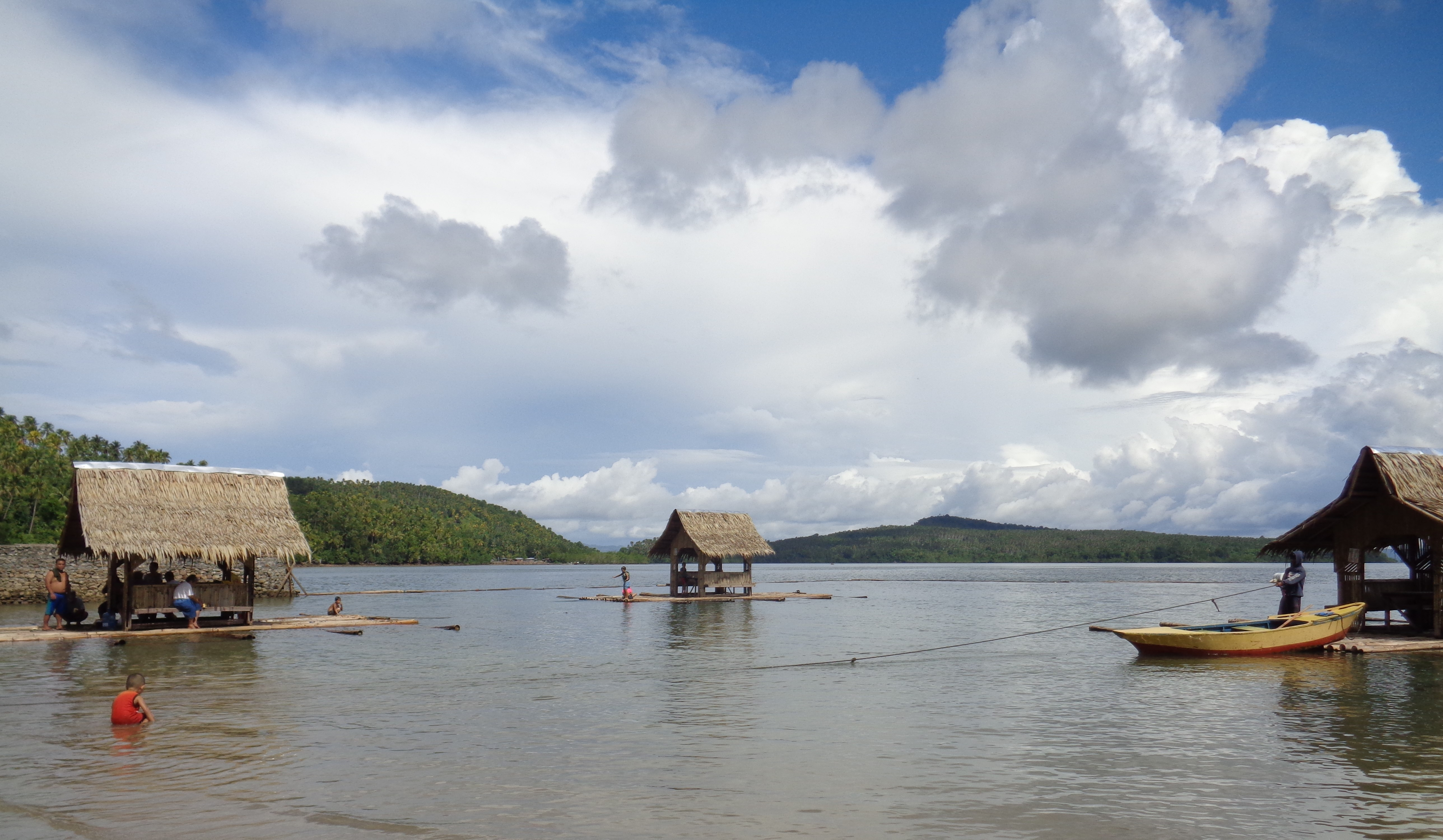
- (from top: left to right) Ayuntamiento and Rizal Park in Zamboanga City, Fort Pilar, Pagadian Mosque, Santa Cruz Island, Plaza Luz Dancing Fountain in Pagadian City, NS Valderosa Road and Margosatubig.

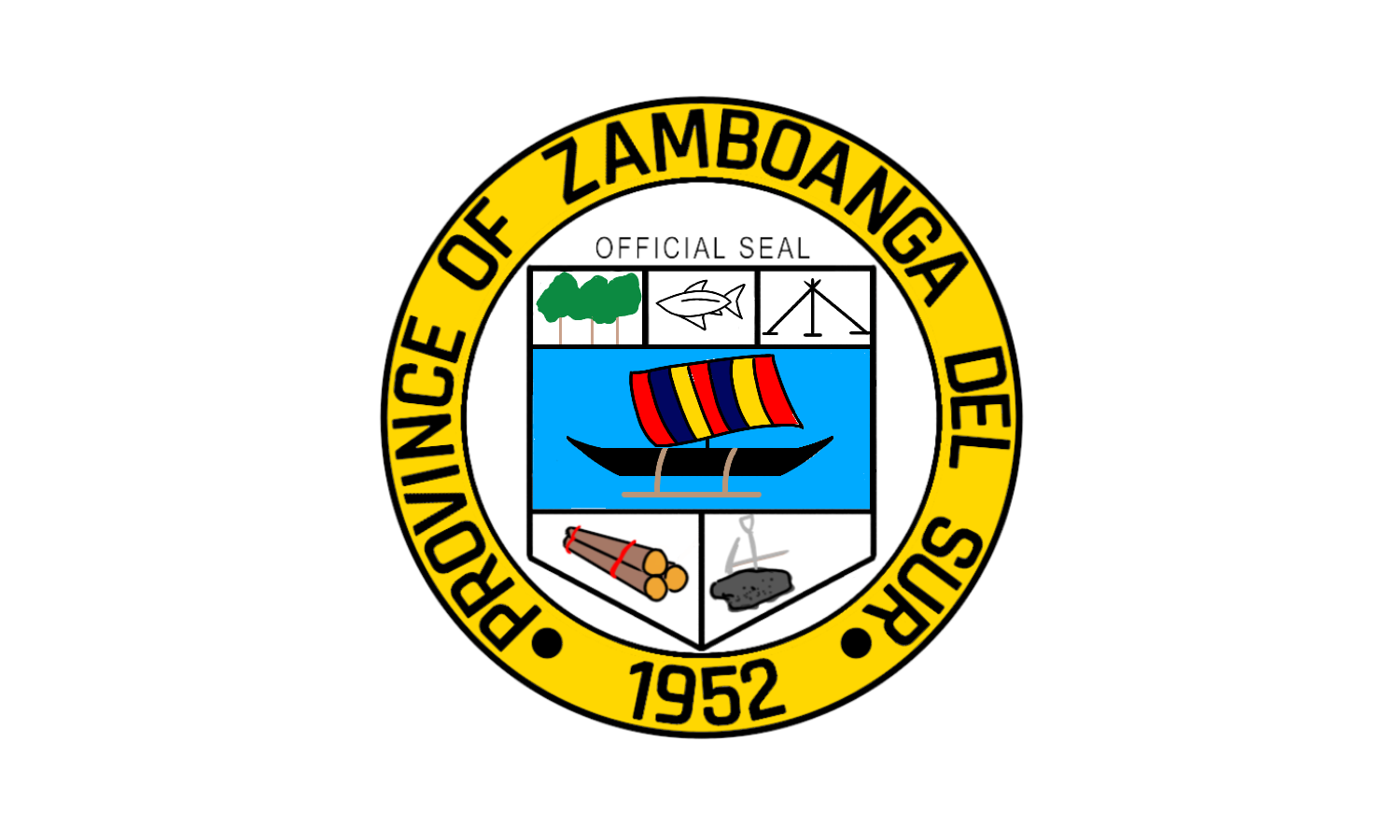
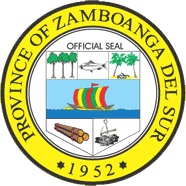
- Flag Seal
- Anthem: Zamboanga del Sur March
- Location in the Philippines
- Interactive map of Zamboanga del Sur
- Coordinates: 7°50′N 123°15′E
- Country: Philippines
- Region: Zamboanga Peninsula
- Founded: June 6, 1952 (Divide); September 17, 1952 (Celebration)
- Capital: Pagadian
- Largest City: Zamboanga City*

Government
  - Governor: Divina Grace Yu (Lakas)
  - Vice Governor: Roseller Ariosa (PFP)
  - Legislature: Zamboanga del Sur Provincial Board
  - Electorate: 1,196,013 voters (2025)

Area
  - Total: 4,499.46 km^{2} (1,737.25 sq mi)
  - Rank: 25th out of 82
- (excluding Zamboanga City)
- Highest elevation (Mount Pinukis): 1,532 m (5,026 ft)

Population (2024 census)
  - Total: 1,045,126
  - Rank: 26th out of 82
  - Density: 232.278/km^{2} (601.598/sq mi)
  - Rank: 42nd out of 82
  - Households: 239,258
- (excluding Zamboanga City)
- Demonym(s): Zambosurian; South Zamboangueño; South Samboanganon

Divisions
  - Independent cities: 1: Zamboanga City*
  - Component cities: 1: Pagadian
  - Municipalities: 26: Aurora; Bayog; Dimataling; Dinas; Dumalinao; Dumingag; Guipos; Josefina; Kumalarang; Labangan; Lakewood; Lapuyan; Mahayag; Margosatubig; Midsalip; Molave; Pitogo; Ramon Magsaysay; San Miguel; San Pablo; Sominot; Tabina; Tambulig; Tigbao; Tukuran; Vincenzo A. Sagun
  - Barangays: 681; 779 (including Zamboanga City)
  - Districts: Legislative districts of Zamboanga del Sur; Legislative districts of Zamboanga City

Economy
  - Income class: 1st provincial income class
  - Poverty incidence: 20% (2023)
  - Revenue: ₱ 2,801 million (2024)
  - Assets: ₱ 17,995 million (2024)
  - Expenditure: ₱ 1,000 million (2024)
  - Liabilities: ₱ 4,366 million (2024)
- Time zone: UTC+8 (PHT)
- PSGC: 097300000
- IDD : area code: +63 (0)62
- ISO 3166 code: PH-ZAS
- Spoken languages: Cebuano; Maguindanaon; Subanon; Chavacano; Tausug; Iranun; Maranao; Filipino; English
- Website: www.zamboangadelsur.gov.ph
- * Zamboanga City is a highly-urbanized city, politically independent from Zamboanga del Sur.

Zamboanga del Sur (Cebuano: Habagatang Zamboanga; Subanen: S'helatan Sembwangan/Sembwangan dapit Shelatan; Maguindanaon: Salatan Sambuangan, Jawi: سلاتن سامبواڠن; Filipino: Katimugang Zamboanga), officially the Province of Zamboanga del Sur, is a province in the Philippines located in the Zamboanga Peninsula region in Mindanao. Its capital is the city of Pagadian.

Statistically grouped with Zamboanga del Sur is the highly urbanized City of Zamboanga, which is geographically separated and a chartered city and governed independently from the province and also its largest city.

The province borders Zamboanga del Norte to the north, Zamboanga Sibugay to the west, Misamis Occidental to the northeast, and Lanao del Norte to the east. To the south is the Moro Gulf.

== Etymology ==
The name of Zamboanga is the Hispanicized spelling of the Sinama term for "mooring place" - samboangan (also spelled sambuangan; and in Subanen, sembwangan), from the root word samboang ("mooring pole"). "Samboangan" was the original name of Zamboanga City, from where the name of the peninsula is derived from. "Samboangan" is well-attested in Spanish, British, French, German, and American historical records from as far back as the 17th century.

This is commonly contested by folk etymologies which instead attribute the name of Zamboanga to the Indonesian word jambangan (claimed to mean "place of flowers", but actually means "pot" or "bowl"), usually with claims that all ethnic groups in Zamboanga were "Malays". However, this name has never been attested in any historical records prior to the 1960s.

== History ==
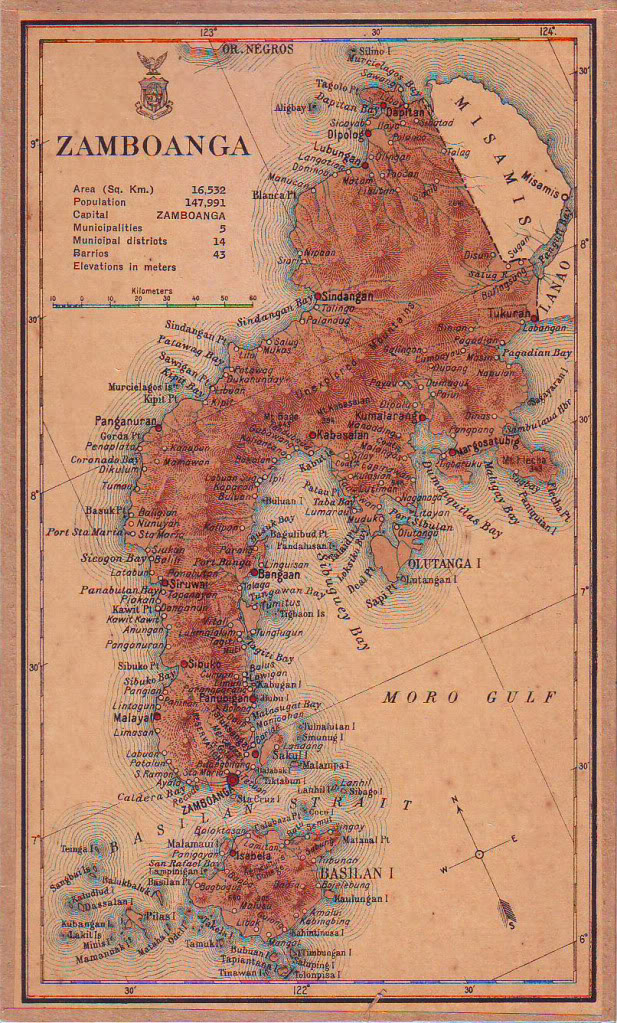
The historical province of Zamboanga in 1918

.

=== Early history ===
The original inhabitants of the Zamboanga Peninsula were the Subanen, who settled along the riverbanks in inland areas; and the various Sama-Bajau and Yakan ethnic groups who settled in coastal areas. Tausūg settlers from northeastern Mindanao also migrated to the region in the 13th century.

The region was additionally settled by migrants (mostly from the Visayas islands) after World War II. Together with the original settlers, these pioneers helped develop Zamboanga del Sur into the abundant and culturally diverse province, making it a melting pot of cultures..

=== American colonial era ===
Historically, Zamboanga was the capital of the Moro Province in western Mindanao, which comprised five districts: Cotabato, Davao, Sulu, Lanao, and Zamboanga. In 1940, these districts became individual provinces. Zamboanga City became the capital of Zamboanga province.

=== Philippine independence ===
Soon after World War II, the provincial capital was transferred to Dipolog. Molave was created as the provincial capital in 1948.

==== Foundation ====
On June 6, 1952, through Republic Act No. 711, Zamboanga del Sur was carved out from the former Zamboanga province that encompassed the entire peninsula in southwestern Mindanao. As the 52nd province of the Philippines, it originally consisted of 11 towns with the City of Zamboanga and the Island of Basilan, which were later expanded into 42 municipalities with the City of Pagadian as the capital.

This happened in the midst of the postwar period, a time when Mindanao was peaceful and increasingly progressive. Ethnic tensions were minimal, and there was essentially no presence of secessionists groups in Mindanao. Tensions in Mindanao mostly began to rise only as the 1970s approached, as a result of social and economic tensions which affected the whole country.

==== The Marcos era ====
The late 1960s in Mindanao saw a rise in land dispute conflicts arising from the influx of settlers from Luzon and Visayas, and from the Marcos administration’s encouragement of militia groups such as the Ilaga. News of the 1968 Jabidah massacre ignited a furor in the Moro community, and ethnic tensions encouraged with the formation of secessionist movements, starting from the largely political Muslim Independence Movement and Bangsamoro Liberation Organization, and eventually the Moro National Liberation Front (MNLF), and the Moro Islamic Liberation Front (MILF). Additionally, an economic crisis in late 1969, violent crackdowns on student protests in 1970, and 1971, and eventually the declaration of Martial Law all led to the radicalization of many students. Many of them left schools in Manila and joined New People's Army units in their home provinces, bringing the New People's Army rebellion to Mindanao for the first time.

The September 1972 declaration of Martial Law began a 14-year period historically remembered for its human rights abuses, often involving the warrantless detention, murder, and physical, sexual, or mental torture of political opponents, student activists, journalists, religious workers, farmers, and others who fought against the Marcos dictatorship. In Zamboanga del Sur, these were often attributed to military-endorsed Militias, which included the Ilaga and a number of armed cult groups, which were used to enhance the military's numbers as it fought various resisntance movements.

The year 1982 was a particularly bloody year for Zamboanga del Sur under the Marcos dictatorship, as two massacres happened in the province that year. On February 12, 1982, members of the Ilaga killed 12 persons in Dumingag, Zamboanga del Sur, allegedly to avenge the death of their leader, who they believed had been killed by the NPA. And on May 25, 1982, three people were killed and eight people were injured when the administration's airplanes dropped bombs on Barangay Dimalinao of Bayog, Zamboanga del Sur, allegedly as reprisal for the killing of 23 soldiers by supposed rebels two days earlier. Days later, two more men from the community were picked up and killed, and a few months later, the residence of Bayog's Jesuit parish priest was strafed after he had written letters decrying the torture and harassment of the indigenous Subanon people from his parish, whom government had tagged as communist supporters.

=== Contemporary ===
==== Separation of Zamboanga Sibugay ====
Political developments in February 2001 saw another major change in the territorial jurisdiction of Zamboanga del Sur. Its inhabitants voted to create a new province out of the third congressional district, named Zamboanga Sibugay.

== Geography ==
Zamboanga del Sur covers a total area of 4,499.46 square kilometres (1,737.25 sq mi) occupying the southern section of the Zamboanga peninsula in western Mindanao. It is located at longitude 122° 30"" and latitude 7° 15"" north. When Zamboanga City is included for statistical purposes, the province's land area is 591,416 hectares (5,914.16 km^{2}). The province is bordered on the north by Zamboanga del Norte, west by Zamboanga Sibugay, northeast by Misamis Occidental, east by Lanao del Norte, southeast by Illana Bay, and south by the Moro Gulf.

=== Topography ===
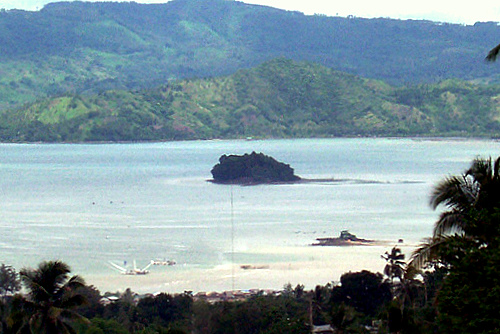
Dao Dao islands within the Illana Bay

Stretching northward from Sibugay in the southwest and running along the northern boundary to Salug Valley in the east is the province’s mountainous countryside. The coastal plains extend regularly from south to west then spread into wide flat lands when reaching the coastal plains of the Baganian peninsula in the southeast.

The longest river in Region IX, the Sibugay River gets its water from the mountains of Zamboanga del Sur most specifically in Bayog and Lakewood, from where it flows into Sibuguey Bay which is now part of Zamboanga Sibugay. Other notable rivers are the Kumalarang River, the Dinas River with its headwaters in the Mount Timolan Protected Landscape, and Salug River in Molave.

=== Climate ===
The province has a relatively high mean annual rainfall: 1,599 to 3,500 millimetres (63.0 to 137.8 in). Temperature is relatively warm and constant throughout the year: 22 to 35 °C (72 to 95 °F).

Climate data for Zamboanga del Sur
Month	Jan	Feb	Mar	Apr	May	Jun	Jul	Aug	Sep	Oct	Nov	Dec	Year
Mean daily maximum °C (°F)	30.4 (86.7)	30.5 (86.9)	31.6 (88.9)	32.6 (90.7)	32.3 (90.1)	31.7 (89.1)	31.6 (88.9)	31.6 (88.9)	31.8 (89.2)	31.5 (88.7)	31.4 (88.5)	30.8 (87.4)	31.5 (88.7)
Mean daily minimum °C (°F)	21.8 (71.2)	21.9 (71.4)	20.8 (69.4)	22.2 (72.0)	21.2 (70.2)	21.0 (69.8)	21.1 (70.0)	21.0 (69.8)	21.1 (70.0)	21.3 (70.3)	21.4 (70.5)	21.3 (70.3)	21.3 (70.4)
Average rainy days	15	10	8	7	10	17	16	16	14	16	17	16	162
Source: Storm247

=== Administrative divisions ===
Map of Zamboanga del Sur

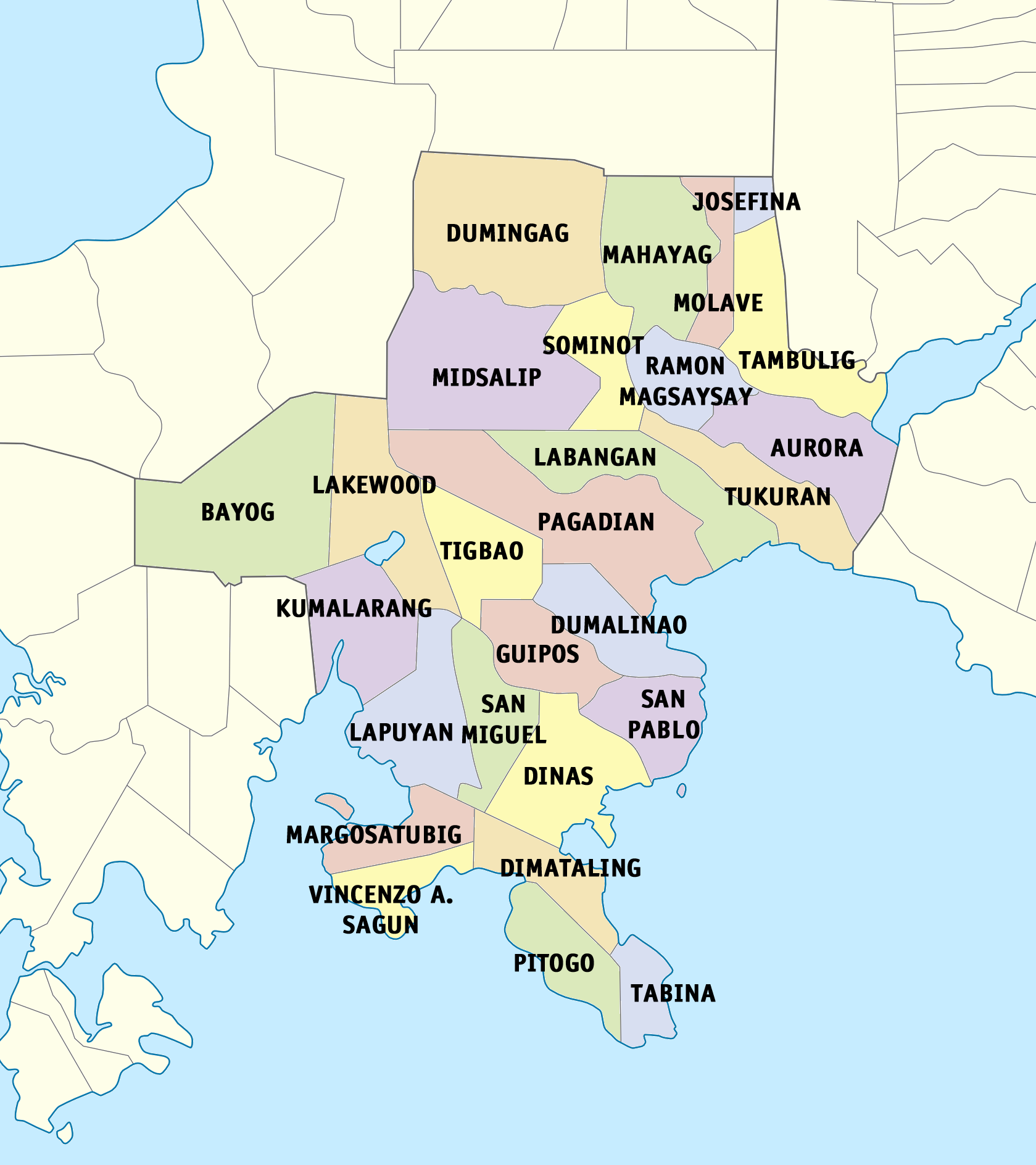
Excluding Zamboanga City

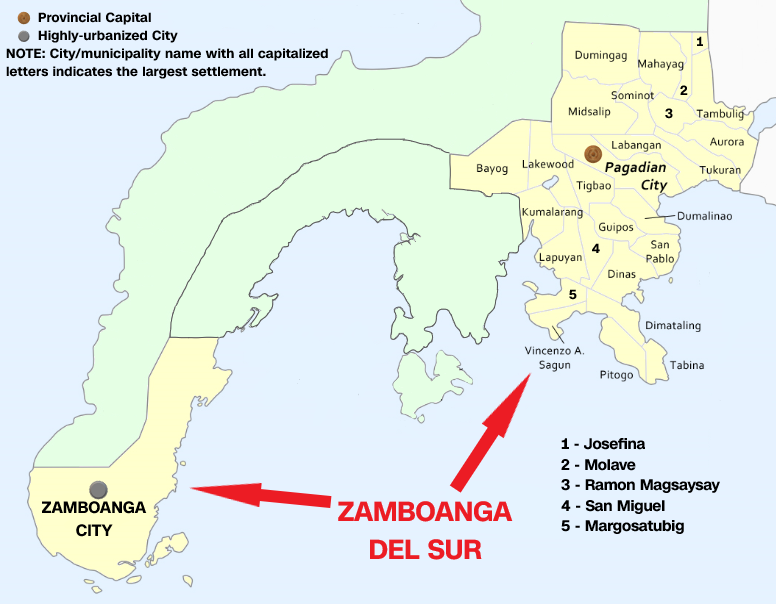
Including the highly urbanized city of Zamboanga for geographical and statistical purposes only

Zamboanga del Sur comprises 26 municipalities, 1 component city and 1 highly urbanized city organized into two congressional districts and further subdivided into 681 barangays.

Traditionally grouped with Zamboanga del Sur is the highly urbanized city of Zamboanga, which is administratively independent from the province.

- † Provincial capital and component city
- Municipality
- ‡ Highly urbanized city (statistically grouped but independent from the province)
- ∞ Largest settlement

City or municipality^{[A]}		District	Population			±% p.a.	Area		Density		Barangay	Coordinates^{[B]}
			(2024)		(2020)		km^{2}	sq mi	/km^{2}	/sq mi		
Aurora		1st	5.0%	52,746	52,995	−0.11%	180.95	69.87	290	750	44	7°57′12″N 123°35′03″E
Bayog		2nd	3.1%	32,687	34,519	−1.27%	356.40	137.61	92	240	28	7°50′49″N 123°02′33″E
Dimataling		2nd	3.2%	33,156	31,340	+1.33%	141.80	54.75	230	600	24	7°31′48″N 123°21′55″E
Dinas		2nd	3.4%	35,409	36,291	−0.58%	121.10	46.76	290	750	30	7°36′58″N 123°20′16″E
Dumalinao		2nd	3.3%	34,188	32,928	+0.89%	117.64	45.42	290	750	30	7°49′06″N 123°21′46″E
Dumingag		1st	4.6%	48,495	48,881	−0.19%	297.75	114.96	160	410	44	8°09′20″N 123°20′43″E
Guipos		2nd	2.1%	22,173	21,738	+0.47%	90.53	34.95	240	620	17	7°43′54″N 123°19′16″E
Josefina		1st	1.1%	11,190	12,205	−2.02%	56.35	21.76	200	520	14	8°12′57″N 123°32′41″E
Kumalarang		2nd	2.9%	30,815	29,479	+1.05%	151.49	58.49	200	520	18	7°44′51″N 123°08′45″E
Labangan		1st	4.3%	45,343	44,262	+0.57%	157.90	60.97	290	750	25	7°51′50″N 123°30′47″E
Lakewood		2nd	2.3%	23,599	21,559	+2.11%	201.30	77.72	120	310	14	7°51′10″N 123°09′04″E
Lapuyan		2nd	2.7%	28,686	27,737	+0.79%	329.00	127.03	87	230	26	7°37′55″N 123°11′30″E
Mahayag		1st	4.7%	48,695	48,258	+0.21%	194.90	75.25	250	650	29	8°07′47″N 123°26′18″E
Margosatubig		2nd	3.4%	36,025	38,660	−1.65%	111.69	43.12	320	830	17	7°34′31″N 123°09′57″E
Midsalip		1st	3.4%	35,643	33,711	+1.32%	161.56	62.38	220	570	33	8°01′50″N 123°18′57″E
Molave		1st	5.0%	52,540	53,140	−0.27%	251.50	97.10	210	540	25	8°05′34″N 123°29′06″E
Pagadian City	†	1st	19.8%	206,483	210,452	−0.45%	378.80	146.26	550	1,400	54	7°49′30″N 123°26′11″E
Pitogo		2nd	2.7%	28,375	27,516	+0.73%	95.94	37.04	300	780	15	7°27′06″N 123°18′48″E
Ramon Magsaysay		1st	2.7%	28,419	27,280	+0.97%	113.70	43.90	250	650	27	8°00′14″N 123°29′08″E
San Miguel		2nd	1.9%	20,037	19,838	+0.24%	181.59	70.11	110	280	18	7°38′54″N 123°16′03″E
San Pablo		2nd	2.5%	26,116	26,648	−0.47%	149.90	57.88	170	440	28	7°39′21″N 123°27′40″E
Sominot		1st	1.7%	17,247	19,061	−2.32%	111.52	43.06	150	390	18	8°02′28″N 123°22′56″E
Tabina		2nd	2.4%	24,591	25,734	−1.06%	71.65	27.66	340	880	15	7°27′55″N 123°24′36″E
Tambulig		1st	3.6%	37,400	37,480	−0.05%	130.65	50.44	290	750	31	8°04′05″N 123°32′07″E
Tigbao		2nd	1.9%	19,716	21,675	−2.20%	120.69	46.60	160	410	18	7°49′13″N 123°13′40″E
Tukuran		1st	4.1%	42,683	42,429	+0.14%	144.91	55.95	290	750	25	7°51′18″N 123°34′30″E
Vincenzo A. Sagun		2nd	2.2%	22,619	24,852	−2.19%	63.00	24.32	360	930	14	7°30′59″N 123°10′35″E
Zamboanga City∞	‡	2 LD	—	1,018,849	977,234	+0.99%	1,414.70	546.22	720	1,900	98	6°54′17″N 122°04′35″E
Total^{[C]}				1,045,126	1,050,668	−0.12%	4,484.21	1,731.36	230	600	681	(see GeoGroup box)
1. Former names are italicized.; 2. Coordinates are sortable by latitude. (Italicized entries indicate the generic location. Otherwise, they mark the city or town center).; 3. Total figures exclude the highly urbanized city of Zamboanga.

== Demographics ==
Population census of Zamboanga del Sur

Year	Pop.	±% p.a.
1903	49,337	—
1918	15,139	−7.57%
1939	69,798	+7.55%
1948	121,590	+6.36%
1960	345,118	+9.08%
1970	454,283	+2.78%

Year	Pop.	±% p.a.
1975	484,913	+1.32%
1980	561,361	+2.97%
1990	695,741	+2.17%
1995	766,918	+1.84%
2000	836,217	+1.87%
2007	914,278	+1.24%

Year	Pop.	±% p.a.
2010	959,685	+1.78%
2015	1,010,674	+0.99%
2020	1,050,668	+0.82%
2024	1,045,126	−0.13%

(excluding Zamboanga City)
Source: Philippine Statistics Authority

The population of Zamboanga del Sur in the 2024 census was 1,045,126 people, with a density of 230 inhabitants per square kilometre or 600 inhabitants per square mile. When Zamboanga City is included for statistical purposes, the province's population is 2,063,975 people, with a density of 349/km^{2} (904/sq mi).

=== Religion ===
Most of the inhabitants in Zamboanga del Sur are Roman Catholics. Other Christian groups are Baptists, Methodists, Aglipayans, Church of Christ of Latter Day Saints, Iglesia ni Cristo, Jehovah's Witnesses, Seventh-day Adventist and other Evangelical Christians. There is a large Muslim minority.

=== Languages ===
The most commonly spoken first language in the province is Cebuano, while Chavacano is the majority language in and around Zamboanga City. Filipino and English are also widely used and understood as the national and official language (Filipino) and co-official language (English) of the Philippines, with the former used as a lingua franca for and between various non-local ethnic groups or recent migrants and their families. Minority languages include Maguindanaon, Subanen, Tausug, Maranao, and Iranun as well as Hiligaynon, Ibanag, Ilocano, Kapampangan, Pangasinan and Waray.

== Economy ==
Poverty incidence of Zamboanga del Sur (%)

Source: Philippine Statistics Authority

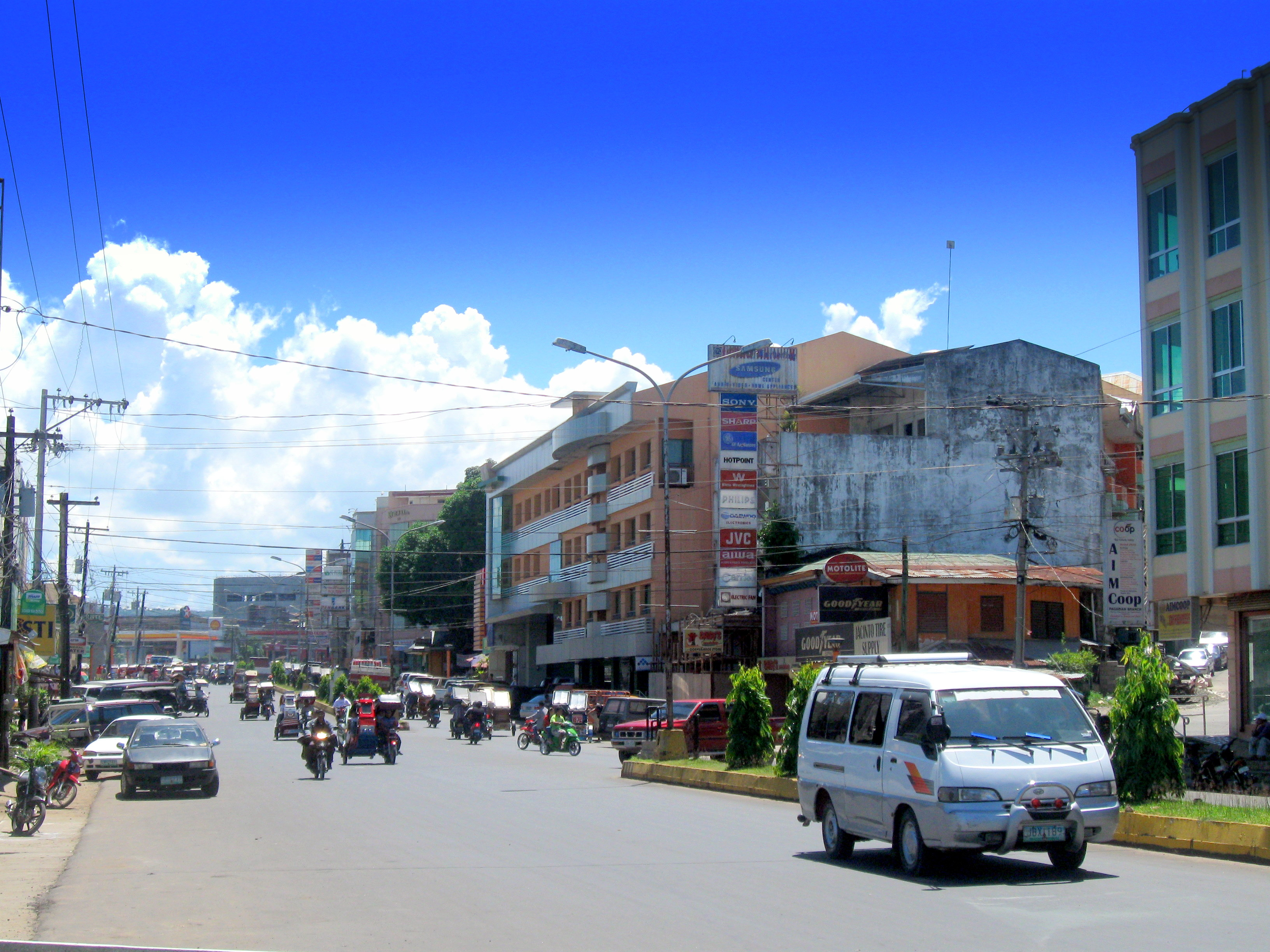
Pagadian City, the component city.

The economy is predominantly agricultural. Products include coco oil, livestock feed milling, rice/corn milling, including the processing of fruits, gifts and housewares made from indigenous materials like handmade paper, roots, rattan, buri, and bamboo; wood-based manufacture of furniture and furniture components from wood, rattan, and bamboo; marine and aquaculture including support services; construction services and manufacture of marble, concrete, and wooden construction materials. There are also mining areas in the province, such as those found in the municipality of Bayog managed by TVI, a Canadian-based mining firm which concentrates on gold mining, and the Cebu Ore Mining which is handling the Ore-Copper-Steel mines. There are also small-scale mines in the municipality of Dumingag.

== Government ==
Governor:

- Victor J. Yu (PDP-Laban)

Vice Governor:

- Roseller L. Ariosa (UNA)

Representatives:

- 1st District - Divina Grace C. Yu (PDP-Laban)
- 2nd District - Leonardo L. Babasa Jr. (PDP-Laban)

Board Members:

- 1st District:
  - Baldomero Fernandez (PDP-Laban)
  - Rogelio Saniel (UNA)
  - Cesar Dacal Jr. (PDP-Laban)
  - Francisvic Villamero (PDP-Laban)
  - Almando Sanoria (NUP)
- 2nd District:
  - Juan Regala (PDP-Laban)
  - Basilio Vidad (PDP-Laban)
  - Raul Famor (PDP-Laban)
  - Ronaldo Poloyapoy (PDP-Laban)
  - Jennifer Mariano (PDP-Laban)
- Ex-Officio:
  - ABC President:
  - PCL President: Teomila Nobleza (PDP-Laban)
  - SK Federation President: Vergel Pilar

== Notable people ==
=== Within the province jurisdiction ===
- Felip Jhon Suson a.k.a. Ken - member of Filipino pop boy band, SB19 (Lakewood)
- Antonio Cerilles - former Secretary of the Department of Environment and Natural Resources (DENR) during the term of President Joseph Estrada; (from 1998 to 2001); Governor of Zamboanga del Sur from 2010 to 2019 (Pagadian)
- Mateo Olivar - Catholic church worker of the Diocese of Pagadian assassinated during the Marcos dictatorship and one of the first to be formally acknowledged as a martyr of the religious sector's resistance against the Marcos dictatorship at the Philippines’ Bantayog ng mga Bayani (Pagadian)
- Enrique Ona - former Secretary of Health (2010 - December 19, 2014); former executive director of the National Kidney and Transplant Institute (Pagadian)
- Francese Therese Pinlac - is a member of MNL48's Team L. She was also a member of TGC Senbatsu before being promoted as an official member of MNL48, the official sister group of the highest-selling JPOP phenomenon, AKB48 (Pagadian)
- Divina Grace Yu - current Governor of Zamboanga Del Sur from 2025-present
- Victor Yu - former Governor of Zamboanga del Sur from 2019–2025 (Pagadian)
