= Governor of Zamboanga del Sur =

Local chief executive

- Gobernador ng Lalawigan ng Zamboanga del Sur (in Tagalog)
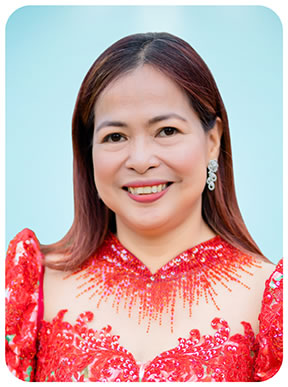
- Incumbent; Divina Grace Yu since June 30, 2025
- Style: Mme./Mrs. Governor, Your Honor, Honorable
- Term length: 3 years
- Inaugural holder: Serapio J. Datoc

The governor of Zamboanga del Sur is the local chief executive of the Philippine province of Zamboanga del Sur. The governor holds office at the Zamboanga del Sur Provincial Capitol. Like all local government heads in the Philippines, the governor is elected via popular vote, and may not be elected for a fourth consecutive term (although the former governor may return to office after an interval of one term). In case of death, resignation or incapacity, the vice governor becomes the governor.

== History ==
Prior to 1952, the whole of Zamboanga was governed by either appointed or elected governors under the historical Moro Province (1903-1914) and Province of Zamboanga (1914-1952). After 1952, then-Governor of Zamboanga Serapio J. Datoc became the province's first governor.

== List of governors ==
#	Portrait	Governor	Term of office	Party	Vice Governor	Party
1		Serapio J. Datoc	July 1, 1952 - March 20, 1954		None	
2		Bienvenido A. Ebarle	March 20, 1954 - January 1, 1962		Vincenzo A. Sagun	
3		Vincenzo A. Sagun	January 1, 1962 - 1962		Javier A. Ariosa	
4		Javier A. Ariosa	1962 - January 1, 1968		None (1962-1964) Vicente M. Cerilles (1964-1968)	
5		Vicente M. Cerilles	January 1, 1968 - December 30, 1969		Bienvenido A. Ebarle	
6		Bienenido A. Ebarle	December 30, 1969 - January 1, 1972		Vicenta C. Enerio	
7		Jose L. Tecson	January 1, 1972 - 1977		Vicenta C. Enerio	
8		Vicente M. Cerilles	1977 - June 30, 1984		None (1977-1980) Raymundo Jose (1980-1984)	
9		Raymundo Jose	June 30, 1984 - 1985		Samuel Arcamo	
10		Samuel Arcamo	1985 - March 25, 1986		None	
11		Javier A. Ariosa	March 25, 1986 - June 30, 1992		Belma Cabilao	
12		Isidoro E. Real Jr.	June 30, 1992 - June 30, 2001		Romeo Vera Cruz	
13		Aurora E. Cerilles	June 30, 2001 - June 30, 2010	Nacionalista (2004-2007) KAMPI (2007-2010)	Roseller L. Ariosa	NPC (2004-2007) KAMPI (2007-2010)
14		Antonio H. Cerilles	June 30, 2010 - June 30, 2019	NPC	Juan Regala (2010-2016) Ace William E. Cerilles (2016-2019)	NPC (2010-2016) Liberal (2016-2019)
15		Victor J. Yu	June 30, 2019–June 30, 2025	PDP-Laban	Roseller L. Ariosa	UNA (2019-2022) PDP-Laban (2022–present)
16		Divina Grace C. Yu	June 30, 2025–present	Lakas–CMD	Roseller L. Ariosa	PFP (2024-present)
