= Victor Yu =

Filipino politician

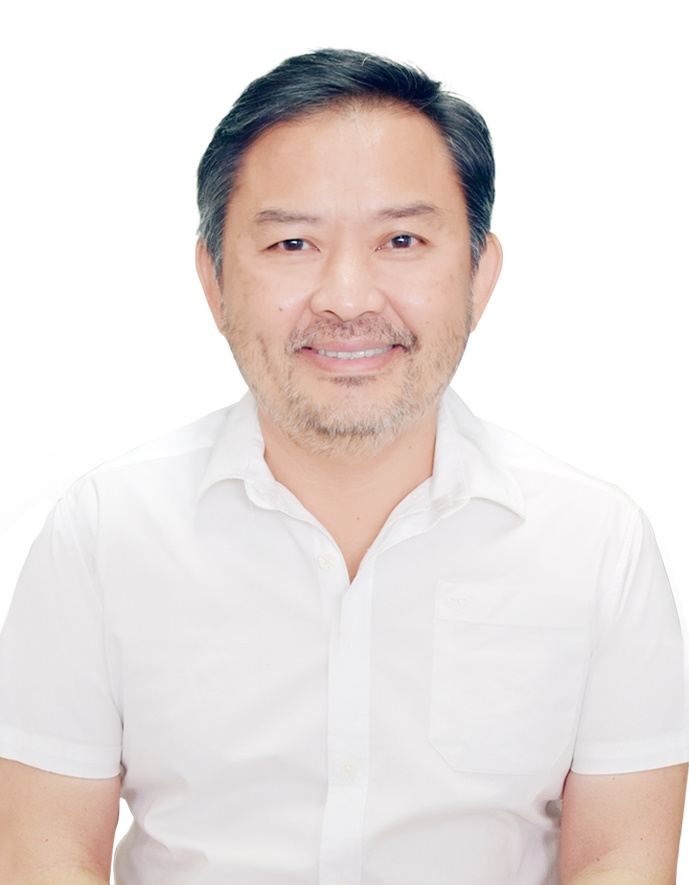

15th Governor of Zamboanga del Sur
- In office June 30, 2019 – June 30, 2025
- Vice Governor: Roseller Ariosa
- Preceded by: Antonio H. Cerilles
- Succeeded by: Divina Grace Yu

Member of the Philippine House of Representatives from Zamboanga del Sur's First District
- In office June 30, 2007 – June 30, 2016
- Preceded by: Isidoro E. Real, Jr.
- Succeeded by: Divina Grace Yu

Personal details
- Born: Victor Jo Yu; December 23, 1965 (age 60) Pagadian City, Zamboanga del Sur
- Party: PFP (2024-present)
- Other political affiliations: PDP-Laban (2018-2024); NPC (2007-2018)
- Spouse: Divina Grace Cabardo
- Children: 3, including Victoria and Joseph
- Profession: Civil Engineer

Victor Jo Yu is a Filipino politician who served as Governor of Zamboanga del Sur from 2019 to 2025. He previously served as the representative of the first district of Zamboanga del Sur in the 14th, 15th and 16th Congress of the Philippines. He signed the House Resolution 1109 calling for a constituent assembly to amend the Constitution.

During the 2019 Elections, he defeated Antonio H. Cerilles by almost 100,000 votes and became Governor of Zamboanga del Sur, ending the latter’s 18-year tenure as provincial governor.

In the 2025 local elections, he ran for mayor of Pagadian City facing Sammy Co, but was defeated.

== Personal life ==
He is the son of Paking Yu of Zamboanga Motors and Ramona Fishing Corporation based in Pagadian. He is married to Divina Grace Cabardo; they have three children.

In September 2021, Yu announced that he contracted the COVID-19 virus.

House of Representatives of the Philippines
Preceded by Isidoro E. Real, Jr.	Member of the House of Representatives from the 1st legislative district of Zamboanga del Sur; 2007–2016	Succeeded by Divina Grace Yu
Political offices
Preceded by Antonio H. Cerriles, Jr.	Governor of Zamboanga del Sur; 2019-2025	Succeeded by Divina Grace Yu
