= Mendero College =

Private college in Zamboanga del Sur, Philippines

- Type: Private non-sectarian college
- Established: June 2008
- Dean: Abegail T. Cabrales, RN, MN
- Location: Barangay Tiguma, Pagadian City, Mindanao, Philippines
- Colours

Mendero College is a new private college offering Bachelor of Science in Nursing at Barangay Tiguma, Pagadian City, Mindanao, in the Philippines. It was founded in June 2008. The base hospital of the college is Pagadian City Medical Center or Mendero Hospital (also referred to by the acronym PCMC).

== See also ==
- List of universities and colleges in the Philippines
