= Pulacan Falls =

Coordinates: 7°51′50″N 123°30′50″E

Pulacan Falls is located in the town of Labangan, 12 km from Pagadian City. It covers an area of about 400 square meters. It is the source of water for the Labangan irrigation system.

The area around it has a permanent Boy and Girl Scout campsite with facilities wherein regional and provincial jamborees are held. Two kilometers from the area is the 134-hectare Home Defense Center and the Headquarters of the 1st Infantry "Tabak" Division of the Philippine Army.
