= Southern Mindanao Colleges =

Private college in Zamboanga del Sur, Philippines

- Type: Private non-sectarian college
- Location: Jamesola St., Sta. Lucia District, Pagadian, Zamboanga del Sur, Philippines; 7°49′21″N 123°26′15″E
- Campus: 4 Campuses
- Colours
- Website: www.smcpag.com
- Location in Mindanao Location in the Philippines

Southern Mindanao Colleges, also referred to by the acronym SMC, is a non-sectarian private college located at Pagadian city, Zamboanga del Sur, Philippines. In terms of student population, SMC has the largest number of enrollees among higher education institutions in the area.

== Campuses ==
- SMC Annex
- SMC Main
- SMC Engineering Building
- SMC Administration Building

== See also ==
- City Commercial Center
- List of universities and colleges in the Philippines
