= Sammy Co =

Filipino politician (born 1966)

Samuel S. Co
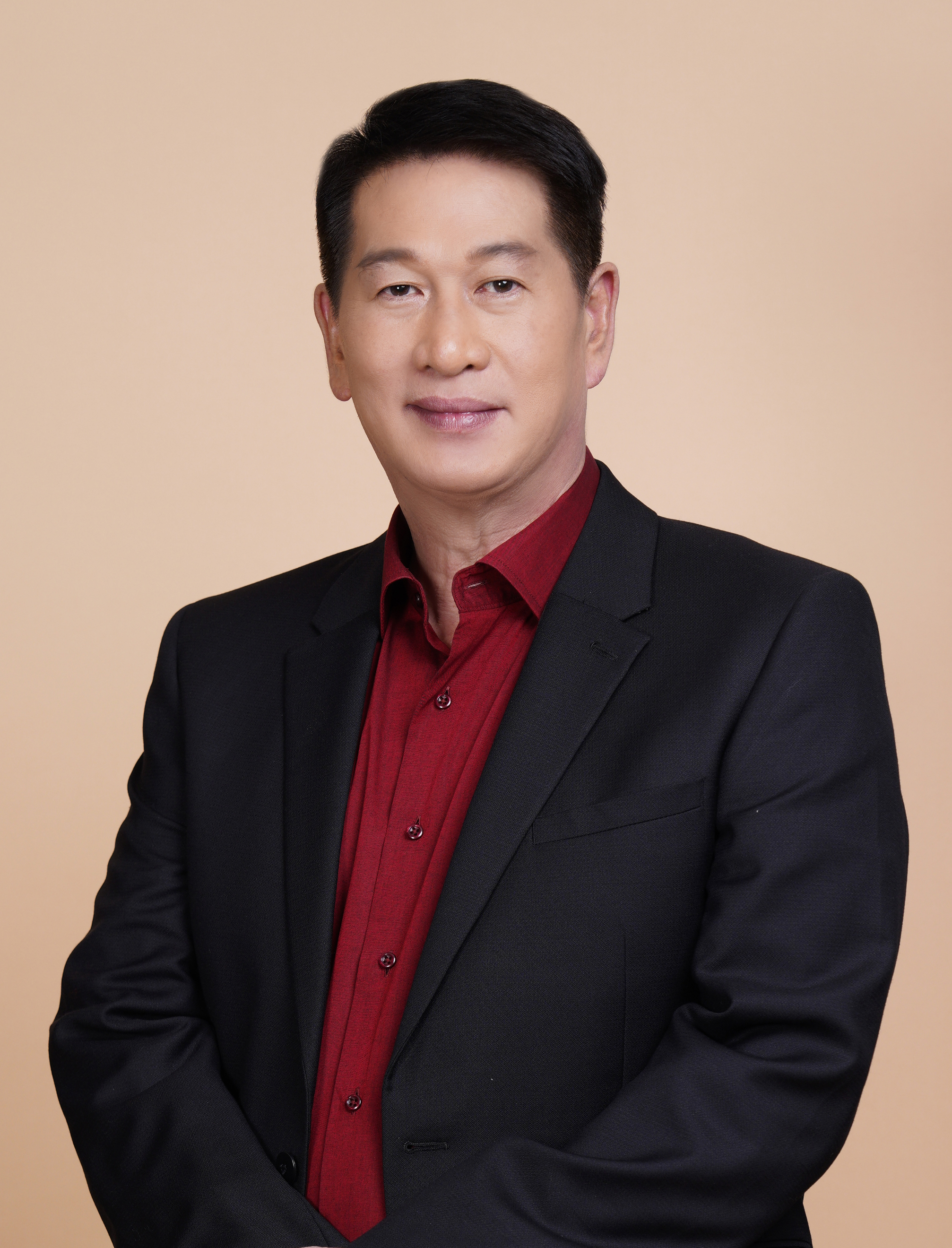
- Official portrait, 2022

Mayor of Pagadian
- Incumbent
- Assumed office June 30, 2019
- Vice Mayor: Maphilindo Obaob
- Preceded by: Romeo Pulmones
- In office June 30, 2004 – June 30, 2013
- Preceded by: Henry Dogon
- Succeeded by: Romeo Pulmones

Vice Mayor of Pagadian
- In office 2003–2004
- Mayor: Henry Dogon

Councilor of Pagadian
- In office 1998–2003

Personal details
- Born: Samuel Sy Co; March 10, 1966 (age 60) Pagadian, Zamboanga del Sur, Philippines
- Party: Lakas-CMD (2024-present)
- Other political affiliations: PDP–Laban (2019-2024); Liberal (2010-2013), PMP (2007-2010)
- Spouse: Priscilla "Ilang-Ilang" Fernandez
- Children: 3
- Profession: Entrepreneur, Politician

Samuel "Sammy" Sy Co (born March 10, 1966) is Filipino businessman and politician, who currently serves as the incumbent Mayor of Pagadian City. He had also served as city councilor of Pagadian for three terms. Co first won the Mayoralty position of Pagadian on June 30, 2004, succeeding Henry Dogon. He won the reelection in both 2007 and 2010 which awarded him his second and third terms of office. His reelection in 2010 gave him 60,452 or 93.99% of the entire local voting population, while Crisostomo T. Lagare of Pwersa ng Masang Pilipino got only 3,863 or 6.01% of the votes. During the 2019 elections, however, he handily defeated Pulmones by almost 15,000 votes to regain the position of Local Chief Executive.

== Early life ==
Co was born on March 10, 1966 in Pagadian, Zamboanga del Sur and is of Chinese descent.

== Political career ==
Co served as city councilor before becoming vice mayor, replacing Henry Dogon when the latter ascended as mayor upon the death of Warlito Pulmones. In 2004, he ran against Henry Dogon to win his first election as mayor of Pagadian.

Position	Duration of office
Mayor of Pagadian	2004–2013; 2019–2028
Vice Mayor of Pagadian	2003–2004
City Councilor of Pagadian	2001–2003
City Councilor of Pagadian	1998-2001

It was during his second term of office, in consortium with former Zamboanga del Sur Governor Aurora Enerio-Cerilles, that the transfer of the regional offices from then regional capital, Zamboanga City to Pagadian City commenced. The order of the transfer was approved and ordered by President Gloria Macapagal-Arroyo in November, 2004, in accordance of E.O. 429 issued by the late President Corazon C. Aquino on October 12, 1990.

He initiated the move to rehabilitate, improve, and expand the Pagadian City Domestic Airport in Muricay, Pagadian City, Republic of the Philippines. The airport is a major entry point to the region for tourists from Manila and Cebu and is now served by the country's two biggest airlines, Cebu Pacific and AirPhil Express.

The sudden decline of consumer interest on malls was downplayed by the local government in the establishment of the City Commercial Center Mall or C3 Mall. Mayor Co received a number of citations from his fellow City Mayors from all over the Philippines for exploring a potential market changer in the future.

He had two successful reelection bids in 2007 and 2010. In the 2010 mayoral race, he won with 93.99% of the votes against 6.01% of opposition Crisostomo T. Lagare, Pwersa ng Masang Pilipino. During his incumbency, he oversaw the rehabilitation of the Pagadian City Airport and the construction of the Philippines's first government-owned mall, the C3 Mall.

After three terms as mayor, he ran for the congressional seat of the first district of the province of Zamboanga del Sur under the Liberal Party. Marred by his alleged involvement in the Aman Futures Scam, he lost to Victor Yu. His wife Priscilla, who was running for mayor of Pagadian, lost to Romeo Pulmones.

=== Regional center dispute with Zamboanga City ===
During Co's second term in office, Pagadian started its now-protracted dispute with Zamboanga City on the regional center issue. On November 12, 2004, Executive Secretary Eduardo Ermita, under the authority of President Gloria Macapagal Arroyo, issued Memorandum Circular No. 75, s. 2004, ordering the transfer of regional offices of departments and agencies from Zamboanga City to Pagadian, except those of the Departments of Trade and Industry, Labor and Employment, and Tourism. The three exempted departments were to remain in Zamboanga, the city being the commercial and industrial center. The same memorandum cited Executive Order 429 issued by President Corazon Aquino which declared Pagadian as the "regional center" of the Zamboanga Peninsula.

Zamboanga City contested the transfer of regional offices to Pagadian. Then Zamboanga Mayor Celso Lobregat rejected a proposition to distribute the regional offices across the region.

In 2010, Executive Secretary Paquito Ochoa, Jr., under the authority of President Benigno Aquino III, issued Memorandum Circular No. 11, s. 2010, halting the transfer of regional offices. The order also maintained status quo, noting that, "The Regional Offices that are already in Pagadian City shall continue to operate thereat."

In 2011, the Regional Development Council (RDC) voted 26–4 in favor of recommending Zamboanga City as the regional center, despite protests from Pagadian. Regional offices that were transferred to Pagadian remain in the city however. The City of Government of Pagadian pursued for the development of the President Corazon C. Aquino Regional Government Center, a government complex in Balintawak which now hosts regional offices of several agencies, including the National Economic and Development Authority.

On June 30, 2020, President Rodrigo Duterte Duterte has signed Memorandum Circular (MC) 79, lifted Memorandum Circular No. 11 (issued by previous administration), allowing the remaining regional offices to transfer to Pagadian after almost 15 years. However, the departments of Trade and Industry, Tourism, and Labor and Employment will remain in Zamboanga City, being the region's center of commerce and industry.

=== Aman Futures controversy ===
Considered as one of the Philippines' biggest ponzi schemes, the Aman Futures Scam robbed investors an estimated PHP 12 billion ($ 294,000,000). The scheme offered a 30 to 60 percent return on investment, enticing 15,000 people, mostly from the low-income class.

In a letter to the National Bureau of Investigation, Zamboanga del Sur Governor Antonio Cerilles implicated Co in the scheme citing the latter's distribution of checks to investors. Co brushed aside the accusation as "character assassination" led by Cerilles, claiming it was aimed at discrediting him to his colleagues in the Liberal Party and derailing his candidacy for the congressional seat of the first district of Zamboanga del Sur.

Co maintained his innocence, but the special panel formed by the Department of Justice found him to have “acted not merely as an investor but also as an agent of Aman.” He was charged of syndicated estafa with Aman Futures founder Manuel Amalilio and other executives of the fraudulent investment firm.

Mayor Samuel Co was one of the first to complain against Aman Futures for syndicated estafa. Despite the subsequent attempts to implicate him and the pending preliminary investigations, these are the unalterable facts:

Mayor Co revoked the business permit of Aman Futures, until it complied with the local government requirements for its particular type of business. Policemen serving the closure order were blocked by people lined up around the office who were waiting to invest. His constituents begged him not to implement the said order. Later, he was informed by police and justice authorities that in the absence of a complainant or assertion of damage, the alleged investment company could not be shut down.

With all the foregoing and other such actions, Mayor Co has clearly shown that he has been on the forefront of the challenge to the said company. His repeated challenges failed, however, due to the lack of complainants to support his suspicions that the company was engaged in illegal activities. The preliminary investigation by the Department of Justice eventually commenced in Pagadian City on December 17, 2012. Pagadian Mayor Samuel Co swore to his complaint affidavit and respondent executives of Aman Futures committed, through their counsels, to submit their counter affidavits on 27 December 2012.

Meanwhile as the hearing was ongoing, hundreds of people gathered outside City Hall to demand justice for the mayor. According to the citizens gathered outside, the counterpart charges filed by the National Bureau of Investigation against Mayor Samuel Co are merely political attacks against him by rival Zamboanga del Sur Governor Antonio Cerilles. Both were allegedly running for office in 2013 for different parties. However, in December 2013, Co was ordered arrested by a court in Bonifacio Global City in Metro Manila.

=== 2028 Gubernatorial run ===
On March 10, 2026, Co during a concert in Plaza Luz, Covered Court and his 60th birthday, announced he was going to run as governor of Zamboanga del Sur. He later confirmed his run for governor on May 1, 2026.

== Personal life ==
Sammy Co is married to Priscilla "Ilang-Ilang" Co (née Fernandez), who was also arrested with him. They have three children, Lance Samuel F. Co, Sam Tyra F. Co, and Samantha Illanz F. Co. He is also a businessman whose portfolio includes Café Ilang-Ilang and franchises of Jollibee, Greenwich Pizza, and Bo's Coffee.

== See also ==
- Pagadian City
- City Commercial Center

== Notes ==
Preceded by Romeo Pulmones	Mayor of Pagadian; 2019–present	Incumbent
