= DXBZ-AM =

Radyo Bagting (DXBZ)

Pagadian; Philippines
- Broadcast area: Zamboanga del Sur and surrounding areas
- Frequency: 756 kHz
- Branding: DXBZ 756 Radyo Bagting

Programming
- Languages: Cebuano, Filipino
- Format: News, Public Affairs, Talk

Ownership
- Owner: Baganian Broadcasting Corporation
- Sister stations: 106.3 Bell FM

History
- First air date: October 2000
- Call sign meaning: Bagting sa Zamboanga

Technical information
- Licensing authority: NTC
- Class: CDE
- Power: 10,000 watts

DXBZ (756 AM) Radyo Bagting is a radio station owned and operated by Baganian Broadcasting Corporation. The station's studio is located at the 2/F, BBC Bldg., Bana St., Brgy. Sta. Maria, Pagadian, and its transmitter is located in Brgy. Upper Bayao, Tukuran.
