= Aman Futures pyramid scam case =

Malaysian marketing company

Aman Futures Group
- Company type: Privately held
- Headquarters: Malaysia
- Area served: Philippines
- Services: Multi-level marketing / Pyramid scheme

Aman Futures Group (simply referred as Aman Futures) was an investment and privately held company based in Malaysia with branches in the Philippines. It has also been allegedly engaged in a pyramid scheme. The group was founded by Manuel K. Amalilio, a Filipino of Malaysian descent.

== Controversy ==
Aman Futures was reported as a pyramid scheme in 2012 by the National Bureau of Investigation of the Philippines that duped some 15,000 people in Mindanao and the Visayas of P12 billion (US$295,000,000 est.). Authorities from the Philippines have set a manhunt for Manuel K. Amalilio, the founder of the company who left the Philippines for Sabah, Malaysia. The "double-your-money" was a phrase being pitched to join the network. NBI has said that there is about 8,000 complaints filed against the company and over 100,000 Filipino families were victimized. Irate victims of Aman Futures have ransacked an office rented by the company in Pagadian City.

After the manhunt for the brain behind the scam was launched, two of the company's employees surrendered. Maria Donna Coyme, who is reportedly the chief finance officer of Aman Futures; and Jacob Razuman, one of the firm's top brokers, are currently being investigated for their role in the scam said the National Bureau of Investigation and the Philippine National Police.

Twenty one Filipino police officers and two fire officers filed syndicated estafa complaint against the company. They said they were promised a return of their investment within eight days and a 50-80% profit for 17 to 20 days.

The Malacañang Palace has assured that the victims of Aman Futures should not take matters of their own, as authorities are doing their work to put to jail those responsible for the pyramid scam that duped thousands in the Visayas and Mindanao area.

Gunmen related to the 14 December 2012 gunshot in Zamboanga City were possible employees from Aman Futures. Investigators said it was possible that the attack may be linked to the Aman Futures that is known to have victimized thousands, including many policemen.

In 2013, the founder of Aman Futures, Manuel K. Amalilio, was caught in Malaysia after pleading guilty to charges of holding false travel documents. He was then supposed to be deported to Manila on Friday, 25 January at estimated time of 19:45 PST to be jailed the NBI said. However, the Malaysian authorities stopped Amalilio's deportation and he was sentenced a two-year imprisonment in Malaysia. Some of the members of the Malaysian opposition in the Philippines disagreed in the Malaysian authorities' stopping of Amalilio's deportation during an interview at ANC. They also have questioned the jail sentence handed down to him in Malaysia. In 2014, Manuel was freed from Malaysian prison following a representation to the court by his family. The Malaysian Department of Foreign Affairs then declined the Philippines' request for extradition.

== See also ==
- Ponzi scheme
