= DXCA =

Philippine radio station

Bell FM (DXCA)

Pagadian; Philippines
- Broadcast area: Zamboanga del Sur and surrounding areas
- Frequency: 106.3 MHz
- Branding: 106.3 Bell FM

Programming
- Languages: Cebuano, Filipino
- Format: Contemporary MOR, OPM, Talk

Ownership
- Owner: Baganian Broadcasting Corporation
- Sister stations: DXBZ Radyo Bagting

History
- First air date: October 2000
- Call sign meaning: Inverted as Antonio Cerilles (station owner)

Technical information
- Licensing authority: NTC
- Class: C, D & E
- Power: 5,000 watts

DXCA (106.3 FM), broadcasting as 106.3 Bell FM, is a radio station owned and operated by Baganian Broadcasting Corporation. The station's studio is located at the 2nd Floor, BBC Bldg., Bana St., Brgy. Sta. Maria, Pagadian, and its transmitter is located in Mt. Pampalan, Pagadian.
