= DXLN =

Radio One Pagadian (DXLN)
Pagadian; Philippines
- Broadcast area: Zamboanga del Sur
- Frequency: 94.1 MHz
- Branding: Radio One 94.1

Programming
- Languages: Filipino, Cebuano
- Format: Contemporary MOR, OPM
- Network: Radio One

Ownership
- Owner: M.I.T. Radio Television Network

History
- First air date: August 1, 1993

Technical information
- Licensing authority: NTC
- Power: 5 kW

Radio One 94.1 (DXLN 94.1 MHz) is an FM station owned and operated by M.I.T. Radio Television Network. Its studios and transmitter are located at Ariosa St., Brgy. Balangasan, Pagadian.
