= DXKV =

Voice Radio (DXKV)
- Pagadian; Philippines
- Broadcast area: Zamboanga del Sur
- Frequency: 91.1 MHz
- Branding: DXKV 91.1 Voice Radio

Programming
- Languages: Cebuano, Filipino
- Format: Contemporary MOR, News, Talk

Ownership
- Owner: Kaissar Broadcasting Network

History
- First air date: 1995
- Call sign meaning: Kaissar Voice

Technical information
- Licensing authority: NTC
- Class: C, D & E
- Power: 5,000 watts

DXKV (91.1 FM) Voice Radio is a radio station owned and operated by Kaissar Broadcasting Network. The station's studio is located along Rizal Ave., Brgy. Balangasan, Pagadian. DXKV is the 1st station opened by Kaissar.
