= Medina College-Pagadian =

Private college in Zamboanga del Sur, Philippines

- Dalubhasaang Medina-Pagadian (Filipino)
- Former names: St. John Hospital and College
- Motto: The New and Bright Horizon in Modern Education
- Type: Private, Non-sectarian
- Established: June 1999
- Chairman: Rico M. Medina Sr., M.D
- President: Dr. Heidi Medina Panique
- Location: Bulatok District, Pagadian City, Zamboanga del Sur, Philippines
- Campus: Bulatok District, Pagadian City
- College Hymn: Medina College Hymn
- Colors: Green and White
- Website: medinacollege-pagadian.org

Medina College-Pagadian is a private nonsectarian higher education institution run by the Medina College, Inc. in Pagadian City, Zamboanga del Sur, Philippines. It was founded by the Medina College, Inc. in 1999. It is the third Medina College founded in Southern Philippines by the Medina College, Inc., along with the main campus in Ozamiz City and a sister school in Ipil. Specializing mainly in the field of nursing, the college formerly known as St. John Hospital and College rose to become one of the best among the medical colleges in Zamboanga del Sur. The school recorded its highest number of enrollment in June 2005.

== History ==
The birth of Medina College-Pagadian dates back more than three decades after June 1963 when Dr. Rico Macan Medina, Sr. and his wife, Dr. Beatriz Crisostomo Medina, found the main campus and eventually, the first private midwifery school in Ozamiz City. This continuous progress did not only end up to just having more constructions and medical establishments in the main campus, but also to the extremes of having a new campus built in Misamis Occidental in 1983, and later in Barangay Bulatok, Pagadian City, Zamboanga Del Sur in 1999.

The school recorded its highest number of enrollment in June 2005. After the birth of JHSCS or Josefina H. Cerilles State College and Mendero College, the enrollments started to decline until this year.
