= Labangan =

Municipality in Zamboanga del Sur, Philippines

- Municipality
- Municipality of Labangan
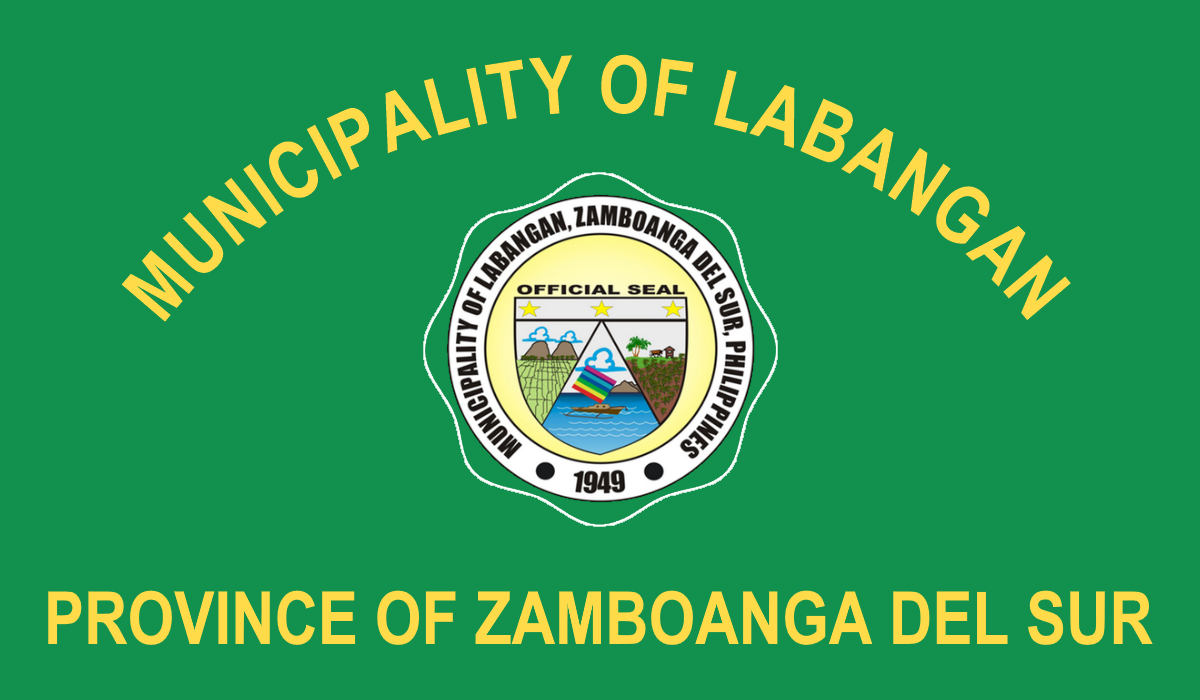
- Flag Seal

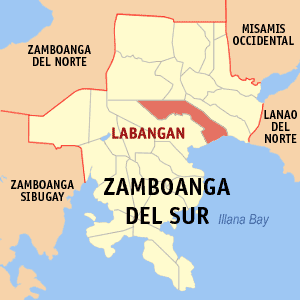
- Map of Zamboanga del Sur with Labangan highlighted
- Interactive map of Labangan
- Location within the Philippines
- Coordinates: 7°52′00″N 123°31′00″E
- Country: Philippines
- Region: Zamboanga Peninsula
- Province: Zamboanga del Sur
- District: 1st district
- Founded: July 20, 1949
- Barangays: 25 (see Barangays)

Government
  - Type: Sangguniang Bayan
  - Mayor: John Raymon Yu
  - Vice Mayor: Sete Balimbingan
  - Representative: Joseph Yu
  - Municipal Council: Members: Neng T. Manupac; Rene Montañez; Ian Buscabos; Abdul Racman Talumpa; Den Pagayao; Khaeilah Ungad; Raul Rivera; Shekinah Grace Tanguilan
  - Electorate: 31,550 voters (2025)

Area
  - Total: 157.90 km^{2} (60.97 sq mi)
- Elevation: 21 m (69 ft)
- Highest elevation: 309 m (1,014 ft)
- Lowest elevation: 0 m (0 ft)

Population (2024 census)
  - Total: 45,343
  - Density: 287.16/km^{2} (743.75/sq mi)
  - Households: 10,307

Economy
  - Income class: 2nd municipal income class
  - Poverty incidence: 32.39% (2018)
  - Revenue: ₱ 210.5 million (2024)
  - Assets: ₱ 758.4 million (2024)
  - Expenditure: ₱ 78.16 million (2024)
  - Liabilities: ₱ 218.6 million (2024)

Service provider
  - Electricity: Zamboanga del Sur 1 Electric Cooperative (ZAMSURECO 1)
- Time zone: UTC+8 (PST)
- ZIP code: 7017
- PSGC: 0907312000
- IDD : area code: +63 (0)62
- Native languages: Subanon; Cebuano; Chavacano; Tagalog; Maguindanaon

Labangan, officially the Municipality of Labangan (Cebuano: Lungsod sa Labangan; Subanen: Benwa Labangan; Maguindanaon: Inged nu Labangan, Jawi: ايڠد نو لباڠن; Chavacano: Municipalidad de Labangan; Tagalog: Bayan ng Labangan), is a municipality in the province of Zamboanga del Sur, Philippines. According to the 2024 census, it has a population of 45,343 people.[4]

== Geography ==
=== Barangays ===
Labangan is politically subdivided into 25 barangays. Each barangay consists of puroks while some have sitios.

- Bagalupa
- Balimbingan (West Luya)
- Binayan
- Bokong
- Bulanit
- Cogonan
- Combo
- Dalapang
- Dimasangca
- Dipaya
- Lagalipan
- Langapod
- Lantian
- Lower Campo Islam (Poblacion)
- Lower Pulacan
- Lower Sang-an
- New Labangan
- Noboran
- Old Labangan
- San Isidro
- Santa Cruz
- Tapodoc
- Tawagan Norte
- Upper Campo Islam (Poblacion)
- Upper Pulacan
- Upper Sang-an

=== Climate ===
Climate data for Labangan, Zamboanga del Sur
Month	Jan	Feb	Mar	Apr	May	Jun	Jul	Aug	Sep	Oct	Nov	Dec	Year
Mean daily maximum °C (°F)	30 (86)	31 (88)	31 (88)	32 (90)	30 (86)	30 (86)	29 (84)	29 (84)	30 (86)	29 (84)	30 (86)	30 (86)	30 (86)
Mean daily minimum °C (°F)	23 (73)	23 (73)	23 (73)	24 (75)	24 (75)	24 (75)	24 (75)	24 (75)	24 (75)	24 (75)	24 (75)	23 (73)	24 (74)
Average precipitation mm (inches)	48 (1.9)	44 (1.7)	56 (2.2)	56 (2.2)	112 (4.4)	135 (5.3)	124 (4.9)	124 (4.9)	115 (4.5)	134 (5.3)	90 (3.5)	56 (2.2)	1,094 (43)
Average rainy days	13.0	11.7	15.6	18.1	25.6	25.7	25.2	24.1	23.8	26.1	22.3	16.5	247.7
Source: Meteoblue

== Demographics ==
Population census of Labangan
Year	Pop.	±% p.a.
1960	12,921	—
1970	15,965	+2.14%
1975	16,257	+0.36%
1980	18,473	+2.59%
1990	29,229	+4.70%
1995	32,264	+1.87%
2000	34,530	+1.47%
2007	37,598	+1.18%
2010	39,168	+1.50%
2015	41,790	+1.24%
2020	44,262	+1.22%
2024	45,343	+0.58%
Source: Philippine Statistics Authority

== Economy ==
Poverty incidence of Labangan (%)

Source: Philippine Statistics Authority

== Tourism ==
- Pulacan Falls - 12 km. from Pagadian City, and covering an area of 400 square meters. It is the source of water for the Labangan irrigation system. Two kilometers from the area is the 134-hectare Home Defense Center. The falls can be reached easily by any motor vehicle. With the opening of the PADAP road, Pulacan Falls became a beautiful camping and picnic site. It now has a permanent Boy and Girl Scout site with facilities and has been the location of regional and provincial jamborees.
- Army Site - The new division site of 1st Infantry (TABAK) Division, Philippine Army, is located on the top of the Hill of Kuta Major Cesar L Sang-an.
