= City Commercial Center =

Shopping mall in Zamboanga del Sur, Philippines

- Location: Pagadian City, Philippines
- Coordinates: 7°49′24″N 123°26′18″E
- Address: Rizal Avenue, corner F.S. Pajares Avenue, Santiago District
- Opened: December 3, 2010; 15 years ago (soft launch); September 23, 2011; 15 years ago (grand opening)
- Developer: Palafox and Associates
- Owner: City Government of Pagadian
- Num. of stores: 450
- Num. of anchor tenants: 3
- Floor area: 28,600 m^{2} (308,000 sq ft)
- Floors: 4

City Commercial Center, more popularly known as "C3" or "C3 Mall", is a government-owned and controlled mixed-use building in Pagadian City, Philippines. The building features an enclosed, air-conditioned mall and office spaces. Robinsons Supermarket occupies the entire lower ground floor. Restaurants such as Chowking, Goldilocks, Red Ribbon, and Max's with doughnut chains Dunkin' Donuts and Mister Donut are the main attractions on the upper ground floor.

== Development and Launch ==
C3 stands on what used to be the old public market. Initially named "Pagadian Shopping Mall", the alternative design by Hillmarcs Construction prevailed over the original design by Palafox and Associates due to limitations in area size. Mayor Samuel Co led the project during his last term in office.

On December 3, 2010, C3 had a soft launch with the opening of Robinsons Supermarket. Robinsons Retail's Handyman Do It Center and other shops opened in September 2011 coinciding with 20th Mindanao Business Conference held in Pagadian City. Former US Ambassador to the Philippines Harry K. Thomas, Jr. attended the conference as guest of honor.

On September 23, 2011, C3 was officially launched in an event attended by performers from Manila.

== See also ==
- Pagadian City
