= Pagadian =

Capital city of Zamboanga del Sur, Philippines

- Component city
- City of Pagadian
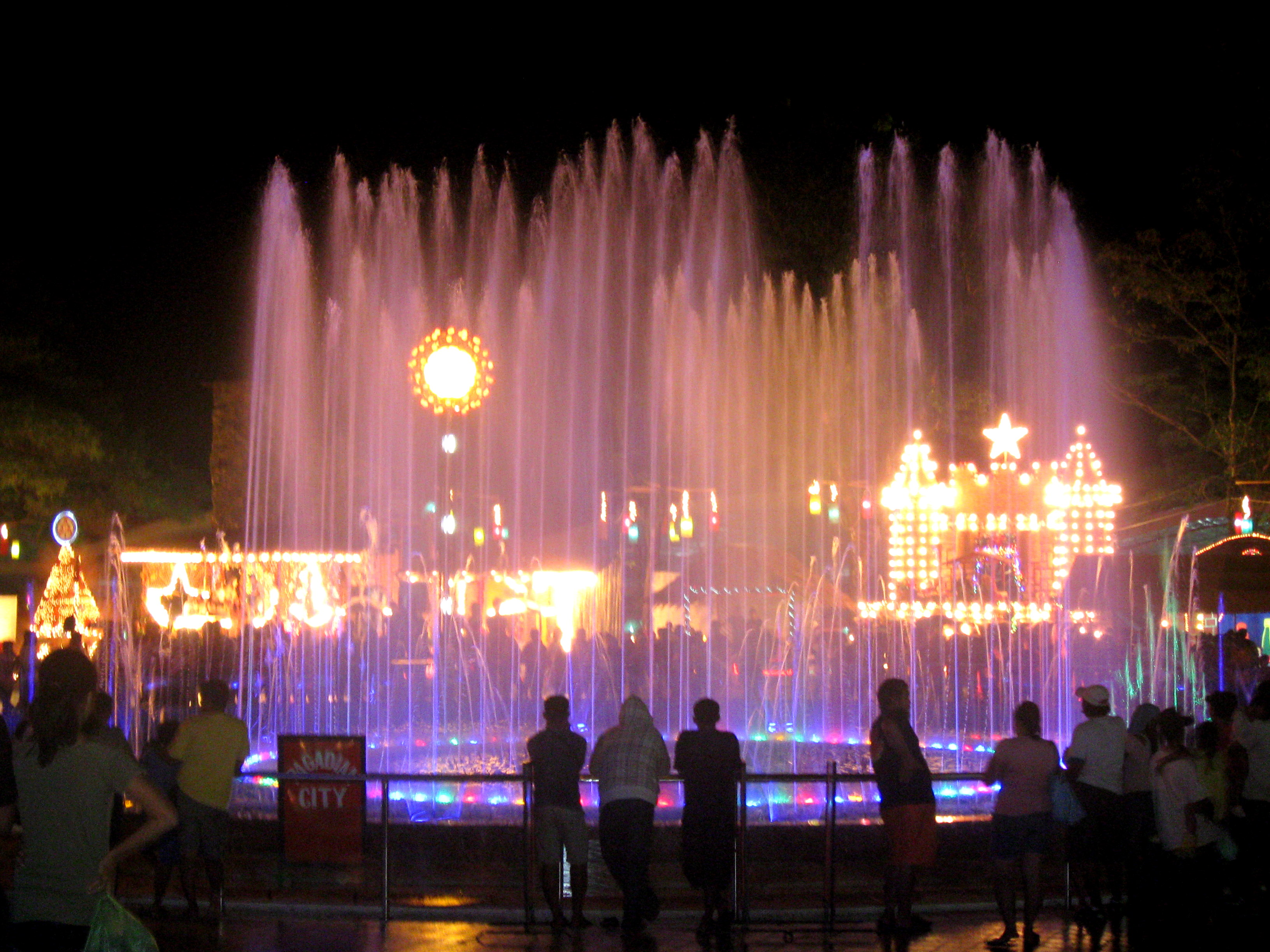
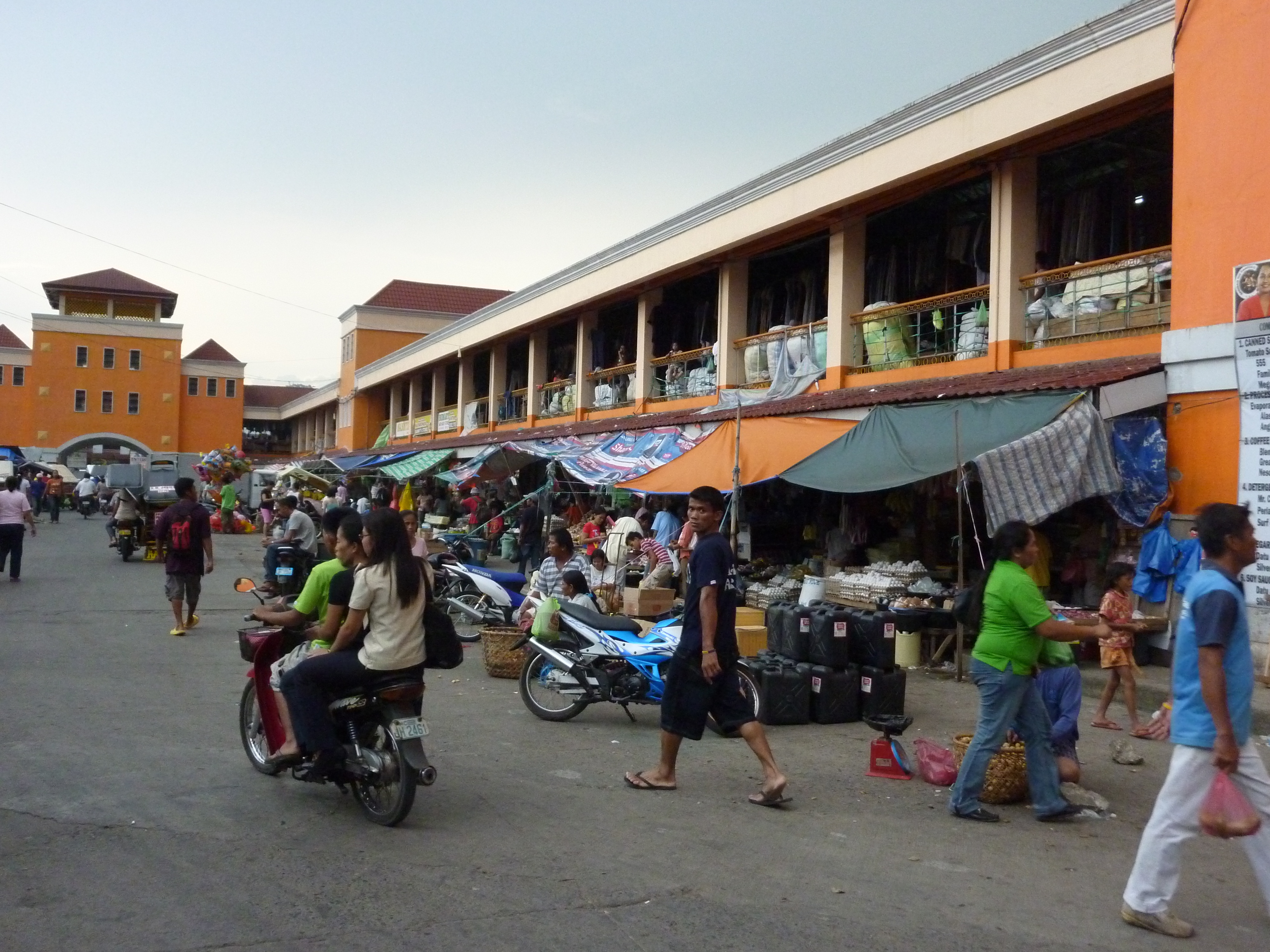
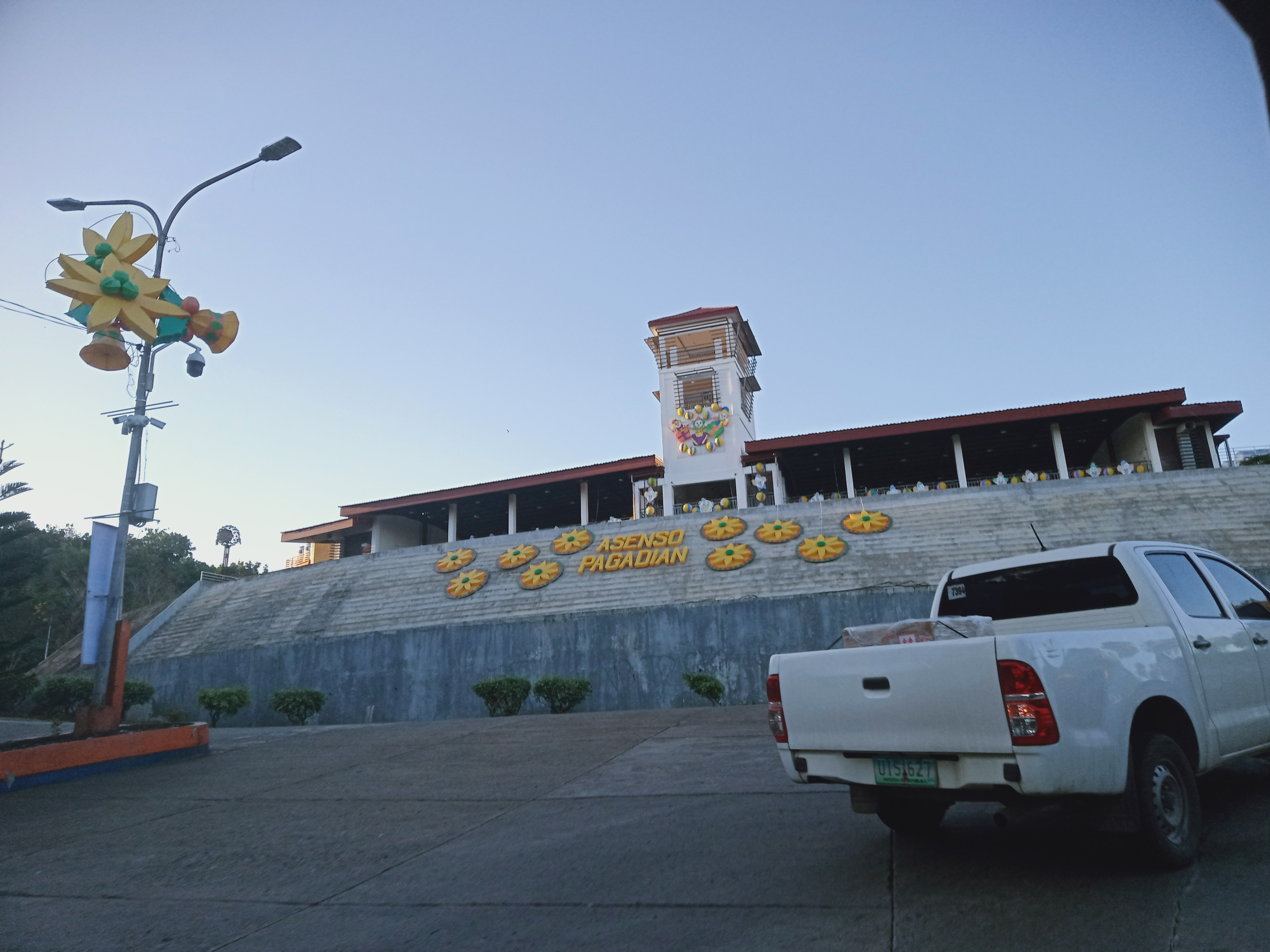
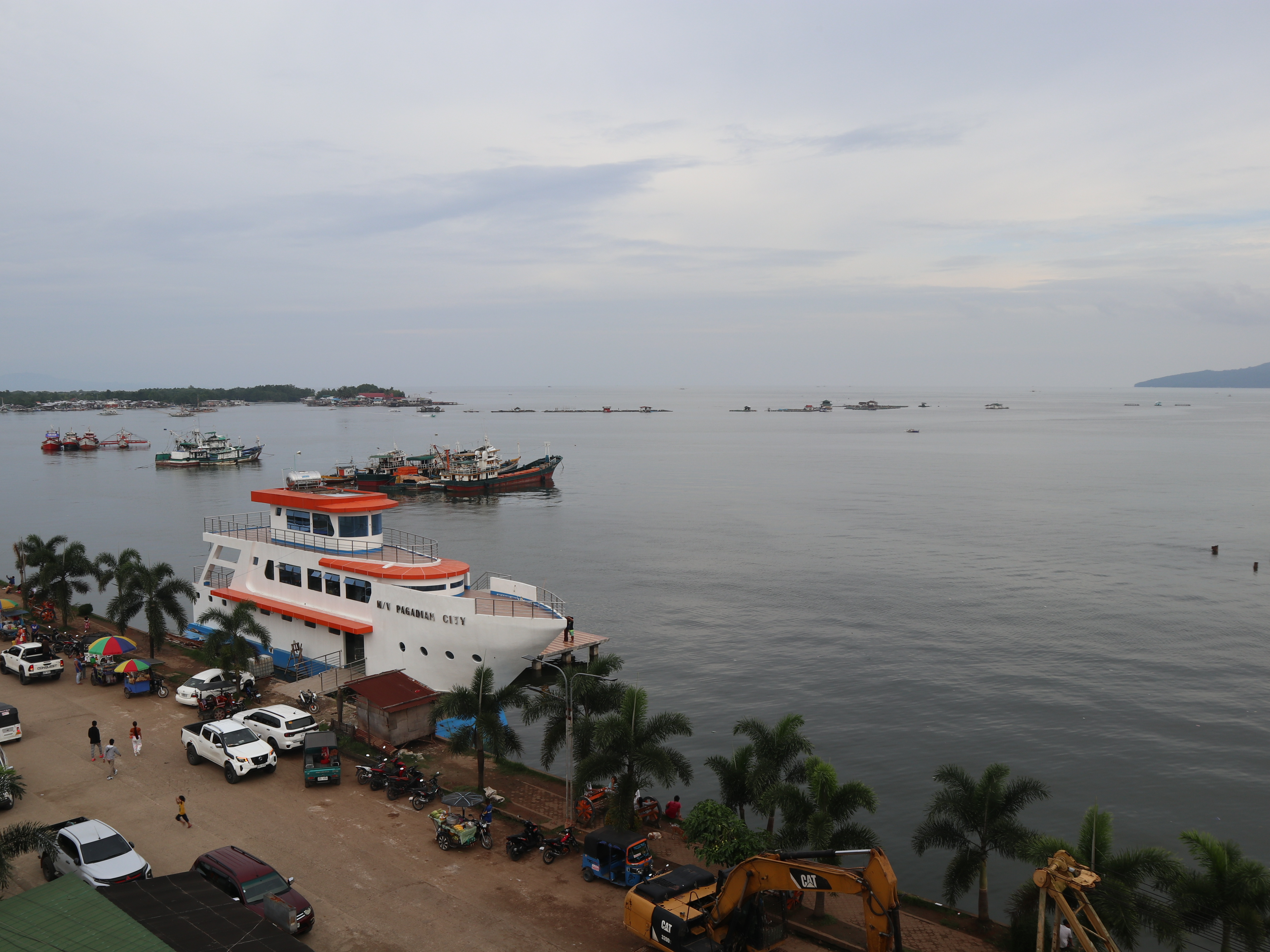
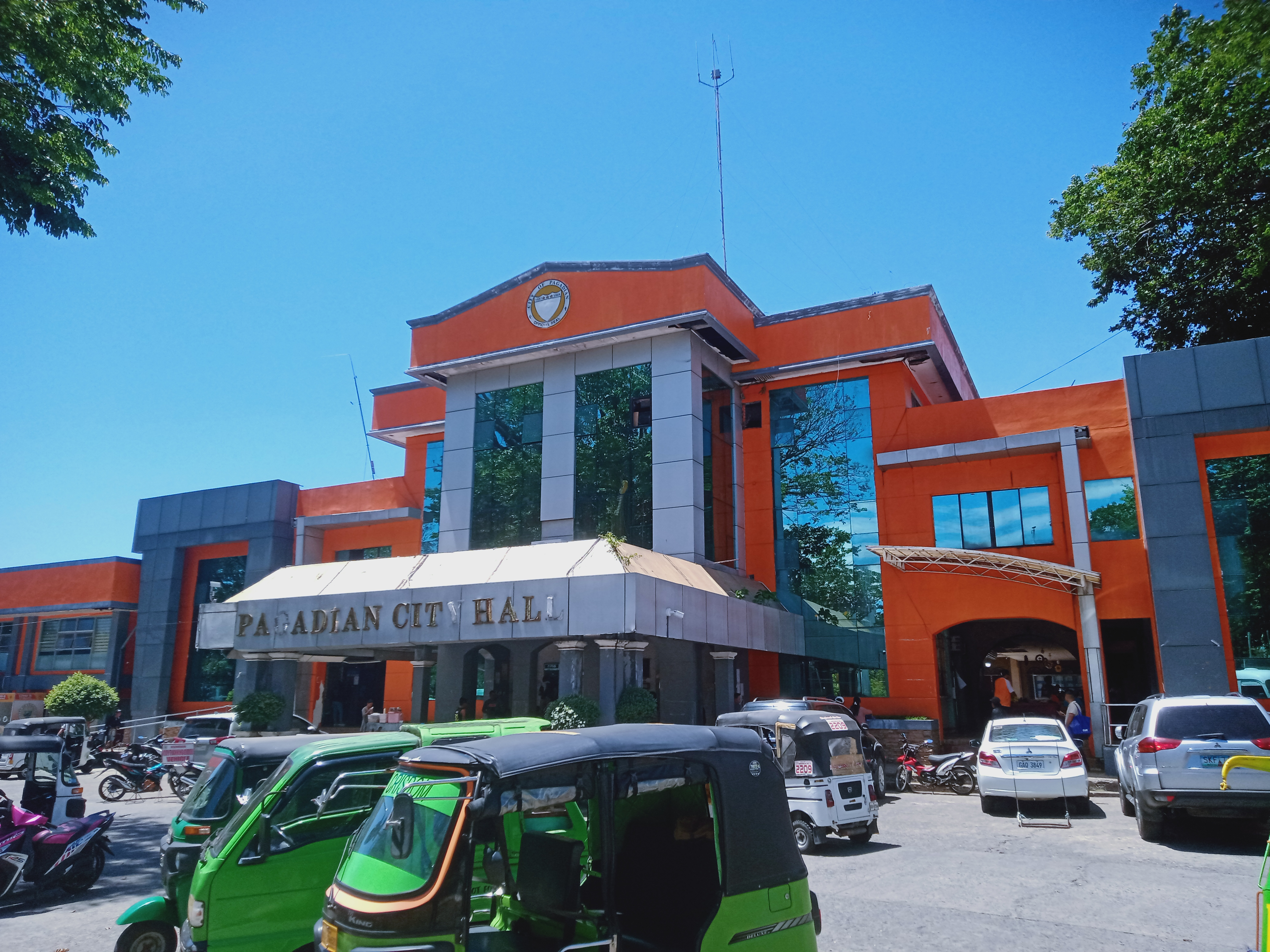
- Plaza Luz Dancing Fountain Pagadian Public Market Rotunda View Deck Pagadian Boulevard City Hall

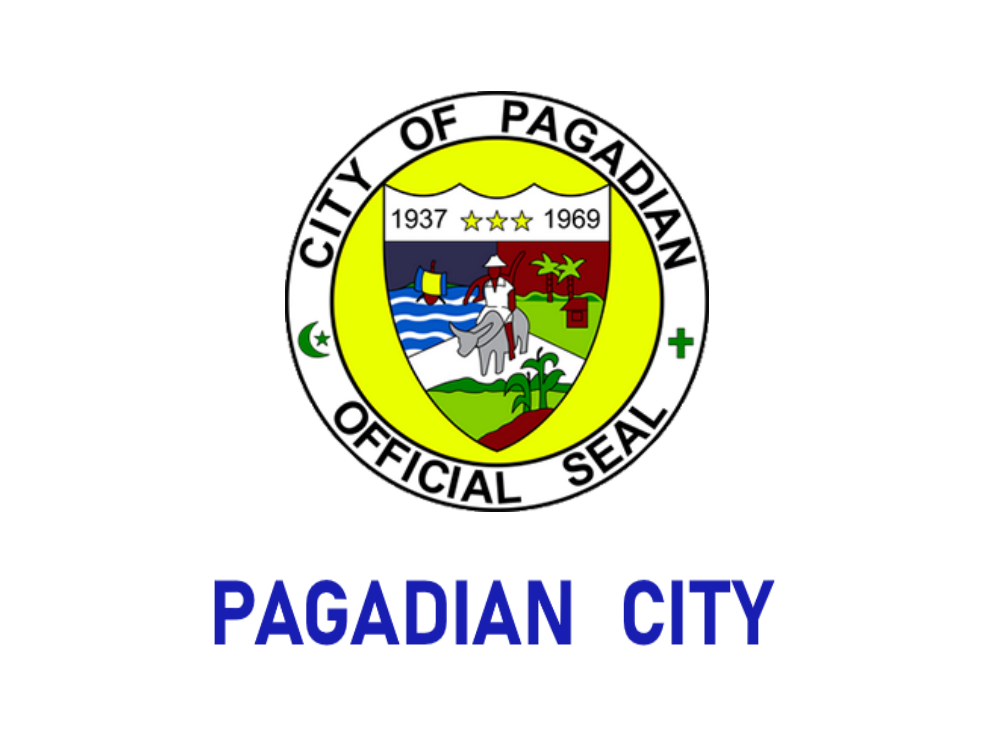
- Flag Seal
- Nicknames: Home of the 40 Degree Tricycle; Little Hongkong of the South
- Motto: Asenso Pagadian!
- Anthem: Beautiful Pagadian
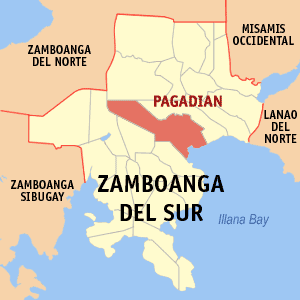
- Map of Zamboanga del Sur with Pagadian highlighted
- Interactive map of Pagadian
- Location within the Philippines
- Coordinates: 7°49′38″N 123°26′11″E
- Country: Philippines
- Region: Zamboanga Peninsula
- Province: Zamboanga del Sur
- District: 1st district
- Founded: March 23, 1937
- Cityhood: June 21, 1969
- Barangays: 54 (see Barangays)

Government
  - Type: Sangguniang Panlungsod
  - Mayor: Samuel Sy Co (Lakas)
  - Vice Mayor: Monique Shaira “Aiko” Yu To (PFP)
  - Representative: Joseph Kim C. Yu (Lakas)
  - City Council: Members: Sam Tyra F. Co; Arnold R. Gavenia; Ronald Christopher Glenn L. Ariosa; Jesuseller M. Duterte; Prescilla M. Fernandez; Fernando Y. Pameron; Troy B. Asugas; Vincenzo E. Cagampang; Teodoro M. Quicoy; Jesus B. Bajamunde Jr.
  - Electorate: 149,477 voters (2025)

Area
  - Total: 378.80 km^{2} (146.26 sq mi)
- Elevation: 187 m (614 ft)
- Highest elevation: 1,402 m (4,600 ft)
- Lowest elevation: 0 m (0 ft)

Population (2024 census)
  - Total: 206,483
  - Density: 545.10/km^{2} (1,411.8/sq mi)
  - Households: 45,633
- Demonym: Pagadianon

Economy
  - Income class: 1st city income class
  - Poverty incidence: 22.18% (2023)
  - Revenue: ₱ 1,867 million (2024)
  - Assets: ₱ 11,265 million (2024)
  - Expenditure: ₱ 341.1 million (2024)
  - Liabilities: ₱ 2,475 million (2024)

Service provider
  - Electricity: Zamboanga del Sur 1 Electric Cooperative (ZAMSURECO 1)
- Time zone: UTC+8 (PST)
- ZIP code: 7016
- PSGC: 097322000
- IDD : area code: +63 (0)62
- Native languages: Subanon; Cebuano; Chavacano; Tagalog; Maguindanaon; Iranun; Maranao; Tausug; Samal
- Catholic diocese: Diocese of Pagadian
- Patron saint: Santo Niño de Pagadian
- Website: www.pagadian.gov.ph

Pagadian, officially the City of Pagadian, (Note: Cebuano: Dakbayan sa Pagadian; Subanen: Gembagel G'benwa Pagadian; Maguindanaon: Kuta nu Pagadian, كوت نو ڤڬديان; Iranun: Bandar a Pagadian, بندر ا ڤاڬاديان; Chavacano: Ciudad de Pagadian; Cuyonon: Siyudad i'ang Pagadian; Central Bikol: Syudad nin Pagadian; Hiligaynon: Dakbanwa sang Pagadian; Ilocano: Siudad ti Pagadian; Kapampangan: Lakanbalen ning Pagadian; Pangasinan: Siyudad na Pagadian; Waray: Syudad han Pagadian; Filipino: Lungsod ng Pagadian) is a component city and the capital of the province of Zamboanga del Sur, Philippines. It is the regional center of Zamboanga Peninsula and the second-largest city in the region, after the independent city of Zamboanga. According to the 2024 census, it has a population of 206,483 people. The city will be converted into a highly urbanized city by virtue of Proclamation No. 1247, signed by President Rodrigo Duterte on November 8, 2021. This will take effect after ratification in a plebiscite.

Pagadian began as a stop-over for traders who plied the road between the old Spanish fort-town of Zamboanga on the southwestern tip of the Zamboanga Peninsula and other bigger towns to the north of the old Zamboanga Province. Except for its sheltered bay and good fishing grounds, it was not a promising site because it is situated on steeply rolling terrain. In the course of its local history, waves of different kinds of people came to stay and eventually called themselves "Pagadianons".

The iconic symbol of Pagadian is its uniquely designed tricycle built to adapt to the city's hilly terrain. It is the only place in the Philippines with a public transport vehicle inclined at about a 25-40° angle. In recent years, these iconic inclined public transport have been slowly being replaced by modernized tricycles that are locally called "bao-bao", a kind of auto rickshaw, due to the latter's fuel efficiency, less noise and being environment-friendly due to its smokeless emissions.

== Etymology ==
The name "Pagadian" originates from a Subanen corruption of the Iranun or Maguindanao term padian, meaning "marketplace" (compare with Parián). The modern city of Pagadian was founded on the sitio of Talapukan, which in turn meant "a place where springs abound."

== History ==
=== Subanons (early historic era) ===
The first known settlers in Pagadian were the Subanen people who established a coastal fishing and trading village. The settlers in what would later become Pagadian referred to themselves as "getaw Belengasa," or "from around the Balangasan River" to distinguish themselves from the nearby Subanen populations who were "getaw Dumenghilas" (from around the Dumangkilas River and Bay), "getaw Sibuguey" (from around the Sibuguey River and Bay), or "getaw Thebed" (from around the river of Thebed in Labangan).

=== Sultanate of Maguindanao ===
In the early 17th century, the coastal regions of Zamboanga del Sur (including Pagadian) were annexed by the Sultanate of Maguindanao under Muhammad Kudarat, leading to an influx of Maguindanao and Iranun settlers.

Pagadian came under the local rule of Sultan Datu Akob, an Iranun datu whose daughter caught the fancy of Datu Macaumbang (Sultan of Taga Nonok), also an Iranun from Malabang, Tukuran, which is now part of Pagadian. He was the son of Sharif Apo Tubo, who descended from the bloodline of Sharif Kabungsuwan, the first Sultan of the Maguindanao Sultanate. With the approval of Sultan Datu Akob, Datu Macaumbang married Bai Putri Panyawan Akob, the beautiful daughter of the Sultan of Pagadian and Royal Bai Putri of Raya.

Upon the death of Datu Akob also known as Datu Mimbalawag, his son-in-law, Datu Macaumbang (Sultan of Taga Nonok) assumed leadership; he established the territorial boundaries of the present city proper, from Balangasan River in the west of Tawagan Sur River in the east. Beyond the river of Tawagan Sur was the territory of Datu Balimbingan. At one time, Datu Macaumbang requested the assistance of the Philippine Constabulary due to the rampant banditry and piracy in the area. A detachment led by Col. Tiburcio Ballesteros stationed at Malangas landed at the place and stationed themselves at Dumagoc Island. The arrival of the soldiers restored peace and order, thereby attracting the influx of settlers from other places.

=== Christian settlement ===
The Spanish started sending Jesuit missionaries to Pagadian in 1642 in an attempt to Christianize the natives. But they had to abandon their mission in 1644 due to repeated Muslim raids.

A group of Christian settlers arrived in 1927, led by Mariano Cabrera. On March 23, 1937, the town of Pagadian was established by Executive Order No. 77 of President Manuel L. Quezon. Though using the original Subanen name, the town proper was established in the Muslim sitio of Talapukan.

The increasing Christian population prompted the creation of the Parish of Pagadian in 1938, which was administered by the Jesuits, Columbans, and Filipino priests. Most of the settlers came from Cebu, as evident in the veneration of the Santo Niño de Cebú. The original Santo Niño Church of Pagadian was right across the city plaza, on the site of the current San Jose Parish church. The present Cathedral of the Most Holy Name of Jesus is now located in San Francisco District and was built in 1968.

Pagadian Parish became a diocese on November 2, 1971, and is a suffragan of the Archdiocese of Ozamis. Msgr. Jesus B. Tuquib served as the first bishop and was installed on February 24, 1973. At that time, the Columban Fathers took care of the apostolic services for the first 13 parishes in the newly formed diocese.

As of 2008, the Diocese of Pagadian had 24 parishes.

=== Under Margosatubig (1920s) ===
The present-day Pagadian had its beginnings as a sitio of Margosatubig. In July 1927, it became a barrio under the Municipal District of Labangan, Zamboanga del Sur upon the implementation of Executive Order no.70.

=== Prewar era (1930s) ===
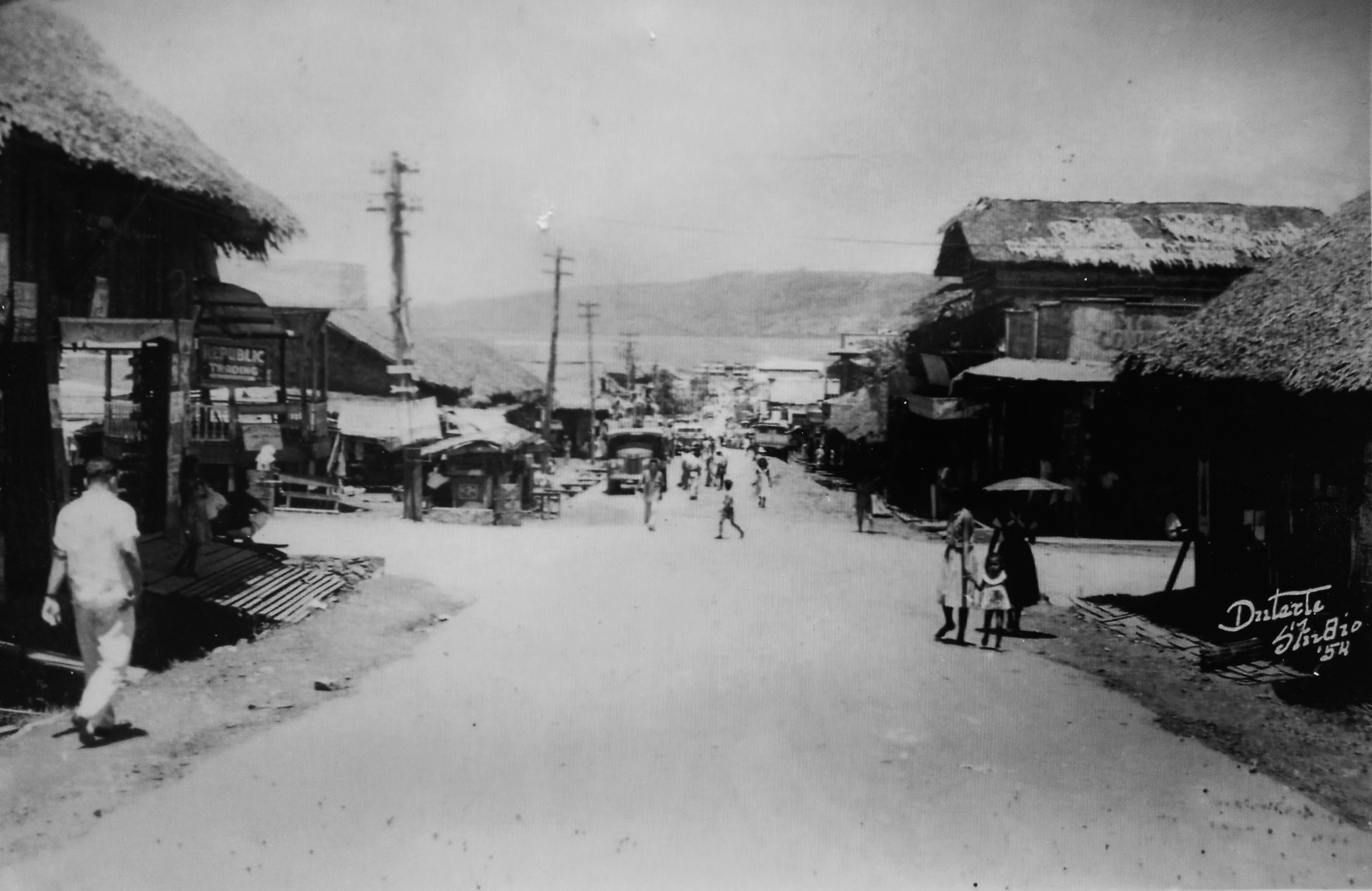
F.S Pajares Avenue circa 1953

The transfer of the seat of the Labangan Government to Pagadian was made in 1934 through the efforts of Director Teofisto Guingona Sr., who was commissioned by Philippine Governor-General Leonard Wood to find out the possibility of transferring the seat of government of the Labangan municipality to another place. A conference was first held, together with the Datus and the early Christian settlers, as the idea of the transfer was at first largely opposed by the Christians. Eventually, a consensus was reached when the designated committee led by Datu Balimbingan of Labangan and with the consent of Datu Macaumbang surveyed the western part of the present area and found Talpokan, a part of the barrio of Pagadian, deemed as a suitable place for such transfer. At the same time, Datu Macaumbang donated 260 hectares of land to Christians who were willing to transfer to the area.

On March 23, 1937, Pagadian became a municipality through Executive Order 77 due to the eager initiative of then Assemblyman Juan S. Alano, with Jose Sanson appointed as acting mayor. Norberto Bana Sr. was elected as the first officially elected municipal mayor after the regular elections. The Municipality of Pagadian was formed by merging the municipal districts of Labangan and Dinas, as a result, making Labangan a district under its former barrio. The newly created town had 19 barangays or districts. In 1950, the barrios of Dinas, Legarda, Mirapao, Migpulao, Kalipapa, Pisaan, Bubway, Tiniguangan, Tabina, and Dimataling, which were under the Municipality of Pagadian, were incorporated into the newly created town of Dimataling. In the same manner, the barrios of Dumalinao Proper, Begong, Nilo, Tigbao, Ticwas, Balongating, Baguitan, Pantad, Napolan, Tagulo, Camanga, Maragang, Sibucao, Tina, Guling, Miculong, Baga, Rebucon, and Mambilik were constituted into Dumalinao in 1956.

=== During World War II ===
Pagadian was occupied by Japanese troops during World War II. From November 5 to 20, 1944, the combined American and Filipino troops attempted to take the town from the Japanese. Sixteen Japanese soldiers were killed, but they remained in possession of Pagadian.

The establishment of the general headquarters of the Philippine Commonwealth Army and the Philippine Constabulary were stationed in Pagadian and active from November 21, 1944, to June 30, 1946, during and in the aftermath of World War II, including the military operations and engagements against the Japanese and liberated areas in Mindanao from November 21, 1944, to August 15, 1945.

=== 1950s to 1970s and the martial law years ===
On June 6, 1952, Congressman Roseller T. Lim authored R.A. 711 dividing Zamboanga into two provinces - Norte (north) and Sur (south) then three months after, on September 17, 1952, it became the capital town of the newly established province of Zamboanga del Sur. Pagadian became a chartered city through R.A. 5478 on June 21, 1969, becoming the third city in the Zamboanga Peninsula.

On August 16, 1976, the city was one of the hardest hit areas in the Moro Gulf earthquake and tsunami of 1976, considered as the most devastating tsunami in the Philippines in recent times. Pagadian was the major city in the area that was struck by both the earthquake and tsunami and sustained the greatest number of casualties.

The 1970s brought a period of numerous concurrent conflicts on the island of Mindanao, including Pagadian and Zamboanga del Sur. This included land dispute conflicts arising from the influx of settlers from Luzon and the Visayas, and from the Marcos administration’s encouragement of militia groups such as the Ilaga. News of the 1968 Jabidah massacre ignited a furor in the Moro community, and ethnic tensions encouraged with the formation of secessionist movements. Additionally, an economic crisis in late 1969, violent crackdowns on student protests in 1970, and 1971, and eventually the declaration of martial law all led to the radicalization of many students. Many of them left schools in Manila and joined New People's Army units in their home provinces, bringing the Marxist–Leninist Maoist armed conflict to Mindanao for the first time.

The September 1972 declaration of martial law began a 14-year period historically remembered for its human rights abuses, often involving the warrantless detention, murder, and physical, sexual, or mental torture of political opponents, student activists, journalists, religious workers, farmers, and others who fought against the Marcos dictatorship. In Zamboanga del Sur, these were often attributed to military-endorsed militias, which included the Ilaga and a number of armed cult groups, which were used to enhance the military's numbers as it fought various resistance movements. Within Pagadian itself, documented human rights violations directly associated with the Philippine Constabulary included the killing of political prisoners at the Pagadian City Jail, while incidents of violence associated with the militias and armed cult groups included violence during the leadup to the 1981 Philippine presidential election and referendum, and the killing of civilians at checkpoints, including that of Catholic church worker Mateo Olivar at a checkpoint in Barangay Labangan, sparking local outrage in the Pagadian parish. Olivar would eventually be honored as a martyr of the resistance against the dictatorship at the Bantayog ng mga Bayani memorial.

=== Growth as a city (late 1980s–present) ===
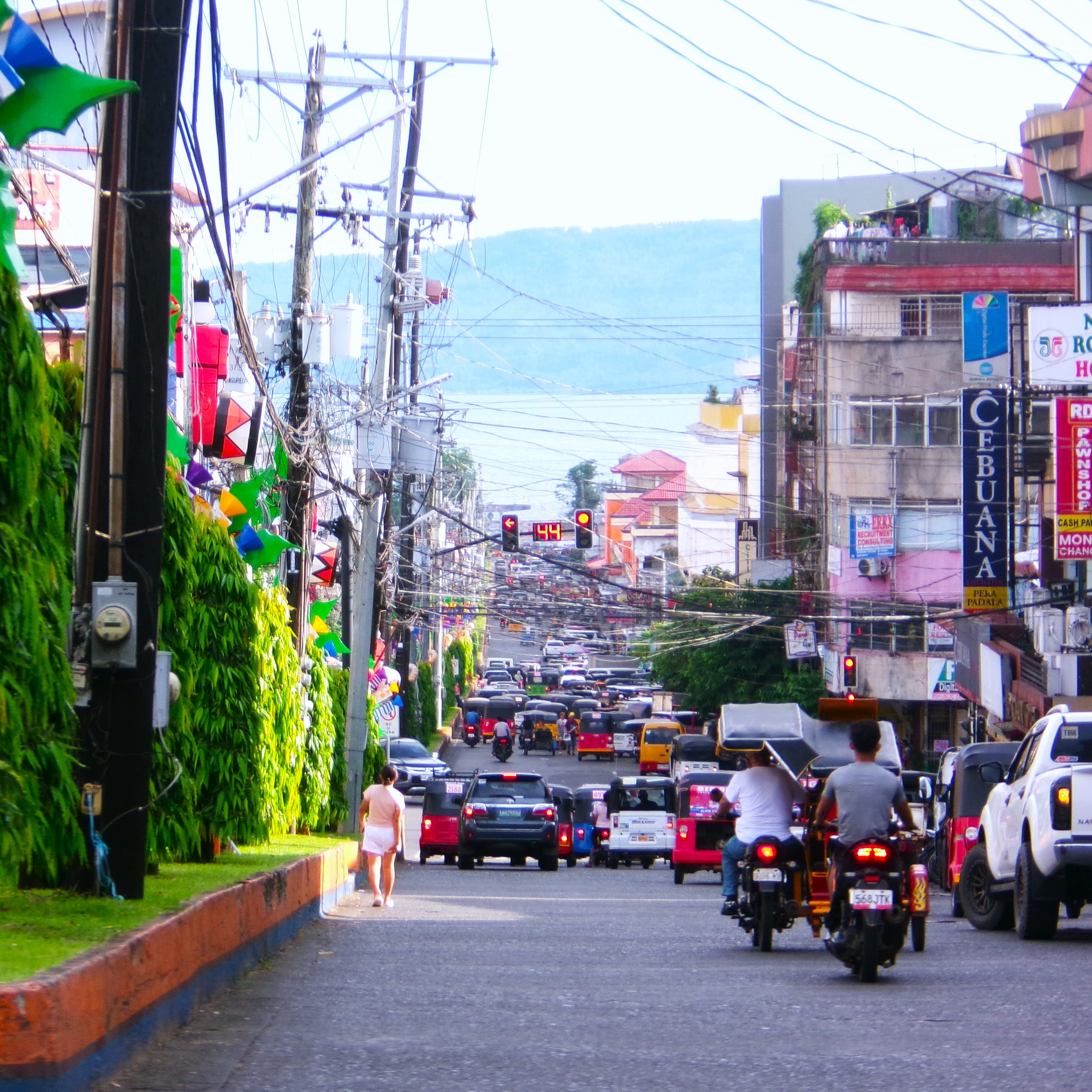
F.S Pajares Avenue 2024

In the 1980s, Mayor Benjamin Arao initiated a layout for the city's future expansion by proposing a North Diversion Road, of which a part would connect to F.S. Pajares Avenue, one of the city's two major roads via a Rotunda that overlooks the greater Illana Bay and the Moro Gulf beyond.

==== Designation as regional center for Region IX ====
In October 1990 President Corazon Aquino issued Executive Order 429 that designated Pagadian as the Regional Center for Region - IX (Zamboanga Peninsula). It was not until November 12, 2004, that Pagadian officially became the Regional Center due in part to the opposition of Zamboanga City, the former regional center, which delayed the process of the transfer.

==== Highly urbanized city ====
Proclamation No. 1247 was signed by President Rodrigo Duterte on December 8, 2021, which sought to convert Pagadian into a highly urbanized city. However, this conversion will only take place after the ratification in a plebiscite.

== Geography ==
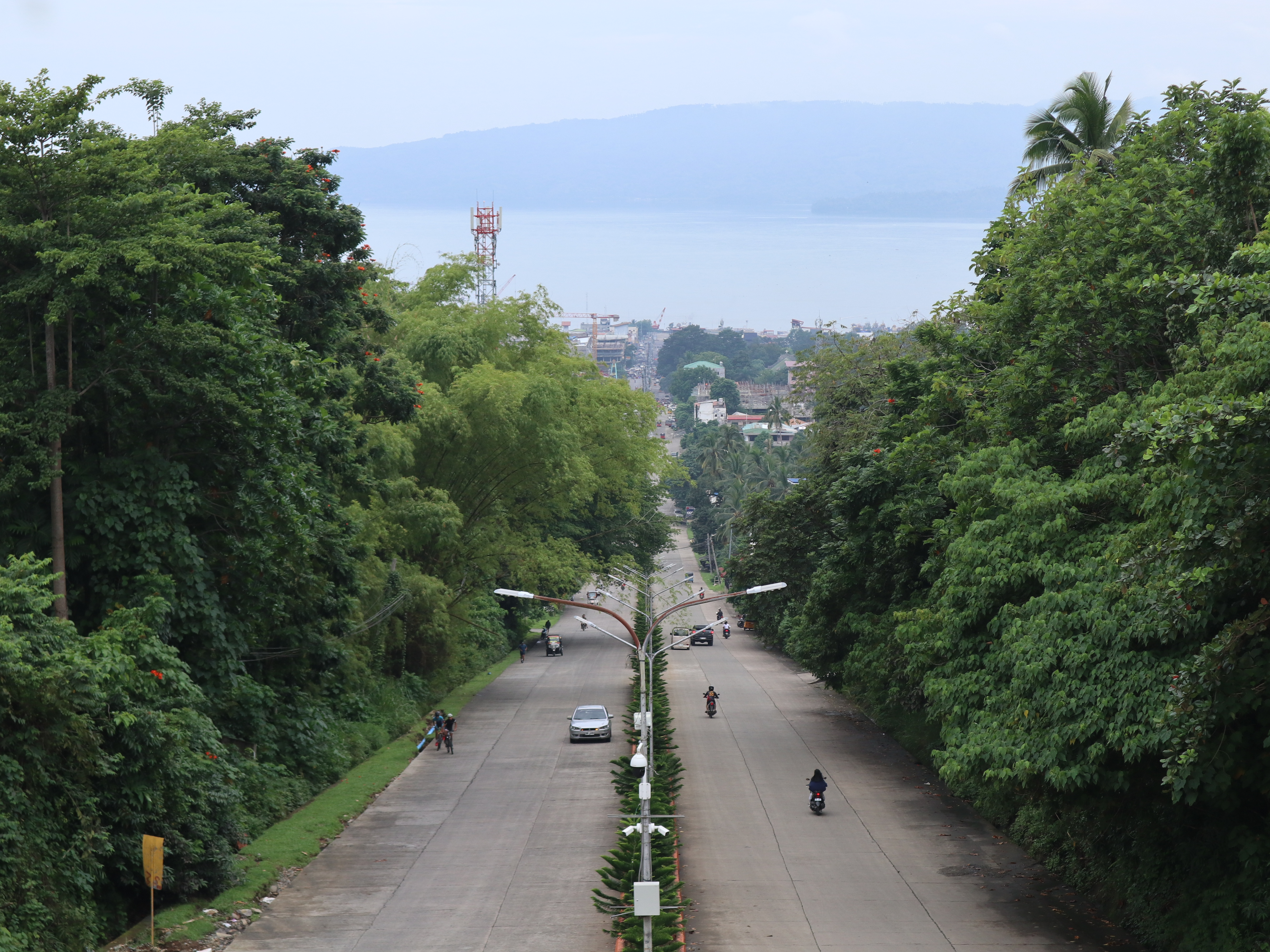
Pagadian City view from the Rotunda

Pagadian is on the northeastern side of the Western Mindanao region, bordering on Illana Bay. It is bounded by the municipalities of Tigbao and Dumalinao on the southwest, Lakewood on the west, Labangan on the east and northwest, and Midsalip on the north.

About 45% of the total city area is steeply sloping terrain of hills and mountains on the northwestern portion that covers an estimated 15,090 hectares. Mt. Sugarloaf (1,376 m.), Mt. Pinukis (1,213 m.), and Mt. Palpalan (650 m.) are the three notable mountain peaks. Areas in the direct north and central part, have gentle to moderate slopes, making up 47% of the total. The remaining 8% is level or nearly level which makes up most of the eastern and the southern parts of the city. The urban area covers about 845.48 hectares. Elevation of the urban area of the city ranges from 1 MSL (mean sea level) near Pagadian Bay to about 100 MSL in the area of Barangay San Jose.

The Tiguma, Bulatoc, Gatas, and Balangasan Rivers, drain to Pagadian Bay and serve as natural drainage. Due to its topography, most of the city's 54 barangays do not experience flooding. The low-lying southern and eastern part of the city occasionally experience flooding, especially during heavy rains.

=== Climate ===
Climate data for Pagadian City, Zamboanga del Sur
Month	Jan	Feb	Mar	Apr	May	Jun	Jul	Aug	Sep	Oct	Nov	Dec	Year
Mean daily maximum °C (°F)	31 (88)	31 (88)	32 (90)	32 (90)	30 (86)	29 (84)	29 (84)	29 (84)	29 (84)	29 (84)	30 (86)	30 (86)	30 (86)
Mean daily minimum °C (°F)	21 (70)	21 (70)	22 (72)	23 (73)	24 (75)	24 (75)	24 (75)	24 (75)	24 (75)	24 (75)	23 (73)	22 (72)	23 (73)
Average precipitation mm (inches)	22 (0.9)	18 (0.7)	23 (0.9)	24 (0.9)	67 (2.6)	120 (4.7)	132 (5.2)	156 (6.1)	119 (4.7)	124 (4.9)	54 (2.1)	24 (0.9)	883 (34.6)
Average rainy days	9.4	9.1	11.5	11.9	20.1	22.5	22.4	23.2	21.5	22.2	15.7	11.5	201
Source: Meteoblue

Located within the tropics of the northern hemisphere, Pagadian has a pronounced dry season from January to March and rainy season from April to December. The area is generally not affected by tropical storms and typhoons as it is located outside the Philippine Typhoon Belt. Temperature ranges from 22.2 to 32.9 °C (72.0 to 91.2 °F). The prevailing winds are the southwest wind that blow from over the sea during dry seasons going northeast, and the trade winds brought from the mountain ranges. Rainfall distribution is moderate from 2,500 to 3,000 millimetres (98 to 118 in) annually.

=== Barangays ===
Pagadian is politically subdivided into 54 barangays. Each barangay consists of puroks while some have sitios.

Currently, there are 21 barangays classified as urban (highlighted in bold) and the rest as rural.

- Alegria
- **Balangasan (Poblacion)**
- **Balintawak**
- Baloyboan
- **Banale**
- Bogo
- Bomba
- **Buenavista**
- **Bulatok**
- Bulawan
- Dampalan
- Danlugan
- **Dao**
- Datagan
- Deborok
- Ditoray
- **Dumagoc**
- **Gatas (Poblacion)**
- Gubac
- Gubang
- Kagawasan
- Kahayagan
- Kalasan
- **Kawit**
- La Suerte
- Lala
- Lapidian
- **Lenienza**
- Lison Valley
- Lourdes
- Lower Sibatang
- Lumad
- **Lumbia (Poblacion)**
- Macasing
- Manga
- Muricay
- **Napolan**
- Palpalan
- Pedulonan
- Poloyagan
- **San Francisco (Poblacion)**
- **San Jose (Poblacion)**
- **San Pedro (Poblacion)**
- **Santa Lucia (Poblacion)**
- **Santa Maria**
- **Santiago (Poblacion)**
- **Santo Niño (Poblacion)**
- Tawagan Sur
- **Tiguma**
- **Tuburan (Poblacion)**
- Tulangan
- Tulawas
- Upper Sibatang
- White Beach

== Demographics ==
Population census of Pagadian

Year	Pop.	±% p.a.
1939	46,262	—
1948	57,913	+2.53%
1960	41,810	−2.68%
1970	57,615	+3.25%
1975	66,062	+2.78%
1980	80,861	+4.12%
1990	106,307	+2.77%

Year	Pop.	±% p.a.
1995	125,182	+3.11%
2000	142,585	+2.83%
2007	161,312	+1.72%
2010	186,852	+5.49%
2015	199,060	+1.21%
2020	210,452	+1.18%
2024	206,483	−0.46%

Source: Philippine Statistics Authority

The people of Pagadian (Pagadianons) are classified into three main groups which is based primarily on faith and heritage: (a) the Subanens (or any other indigenous tribes who had been living in the area before the advent of Islam in Mindanao), (b) the Muslim settlers who came from other parts of Mindanao and other places such as Sabah and Indonesia, and (c) the Christian settlers who generally came from the Visayas and Luzon.

The majority of Pagadianons speak the Cebuano language. The national language, Filipino (Tagalog) is widely understood and is the native tongue of a small percentage of the population. Maguindanaon, Iranun, Maranao, Tausug, and Samal languages are used by the Muslim community. The Subanen dialect is exclusively used by the Subanen people, the original inhabitants of the area. Remaining percentage of the population are classified as Hiligaynon and Zamboangueño speakers. As with the rest of the Philippines, English is widely understood and is used as the primary language for business.

== Economy ==
Poverty incidence of Pagadian (%)

Source: Philippine Statistics Authority

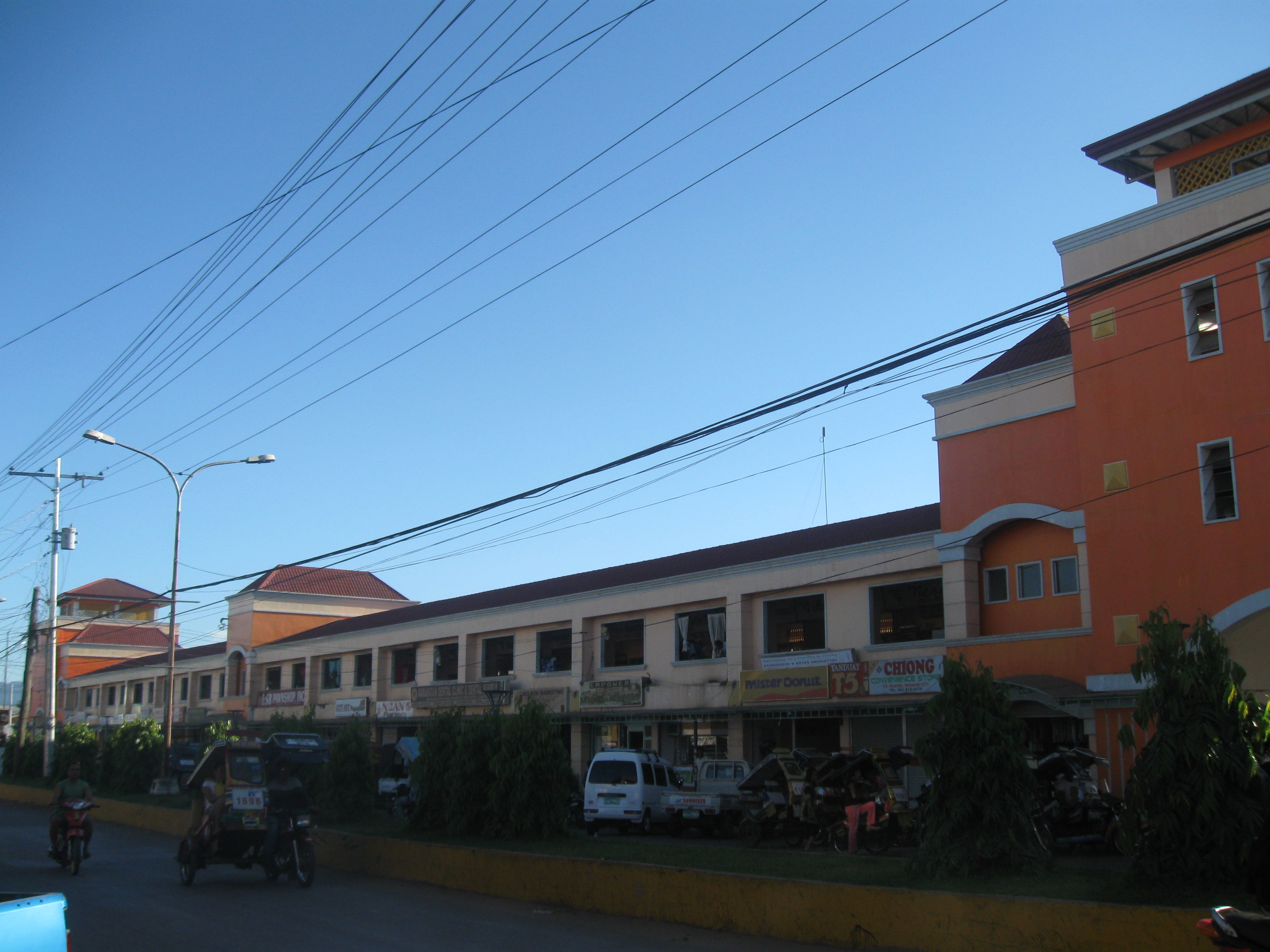
Pagadian City Agora Public Market

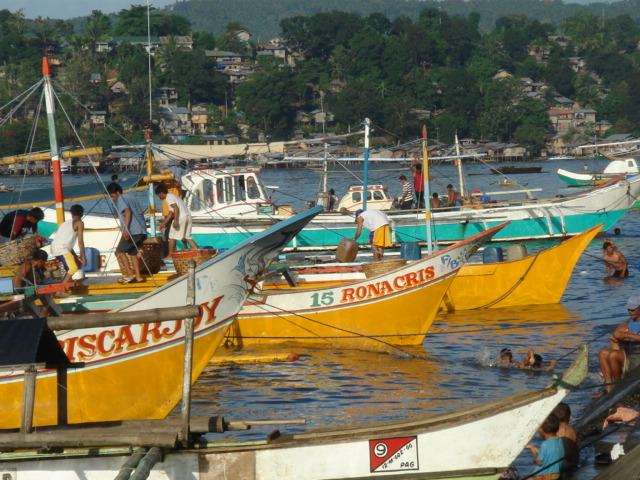
Boats along the Pagadian fishport

Pagadian posted an average annual regular income of P662,511,106.21 from fiscal year 2009 to 2016, thus classifying it as a 1st class component city in the Philippines. As of 2023, it is the 7th wealthiest city in Mindanao with a total asset of P5.568 billion.

The city has an increasing number of businesses in the service sector mainly due to the transfer of the regional offices from Zamboanga City resulting to an influx of visitors from other towns and cities in the Zamboanga Peninsula. This is evident on the bullish construction in the city. Some malls already had made their presence but the most prominent is the city-owned mall, City Commercial Center or C3 Mall, which was built in 2011. However, agriculture is still considered the primary economic resource with the production of rice, corn, coconut, fruit, root crops and animal husbandry. Special funding-assistance programs by the government are made available for local farmers; the City Livelihood Development Assistance Program (CILDAP) extends loans to those who need financial assistance for their livelihood.

Production of raw materials like seaweeds, coco processing, cassava constitute a large part of the local economy; small-scale manufacturing of furniture and decors made out of wood, bamboo, rattan, steel and plastic; handicrafts made out of bamboo, rattan, coco shell, wood, marine shell, ceramics, and weaving.

Pagadian Bay and the outer Illana Bay (Iranun Bay) abound with a wide variety of marine products; seaweed culture farming is flourishing in waters off the bay while fishponds near or along the bay yields milkfish, prawns and crabs. A number of large deep-sea fishing vessels that venture into the Sulu Sea and as far as the South China Sea make Pagadian fishport their base of operation. Because of this, the city is also one of the major suppliers of dried fish and other kinds of seafood in the region.

Another income-generating industry is mining in an area located 1.5 km southeast of Barangay Lison Valley proper approximately forty-nine kilometers from the city proper which yields gold, copper and molybdenum.

== Culture ==
=== Festivals ===
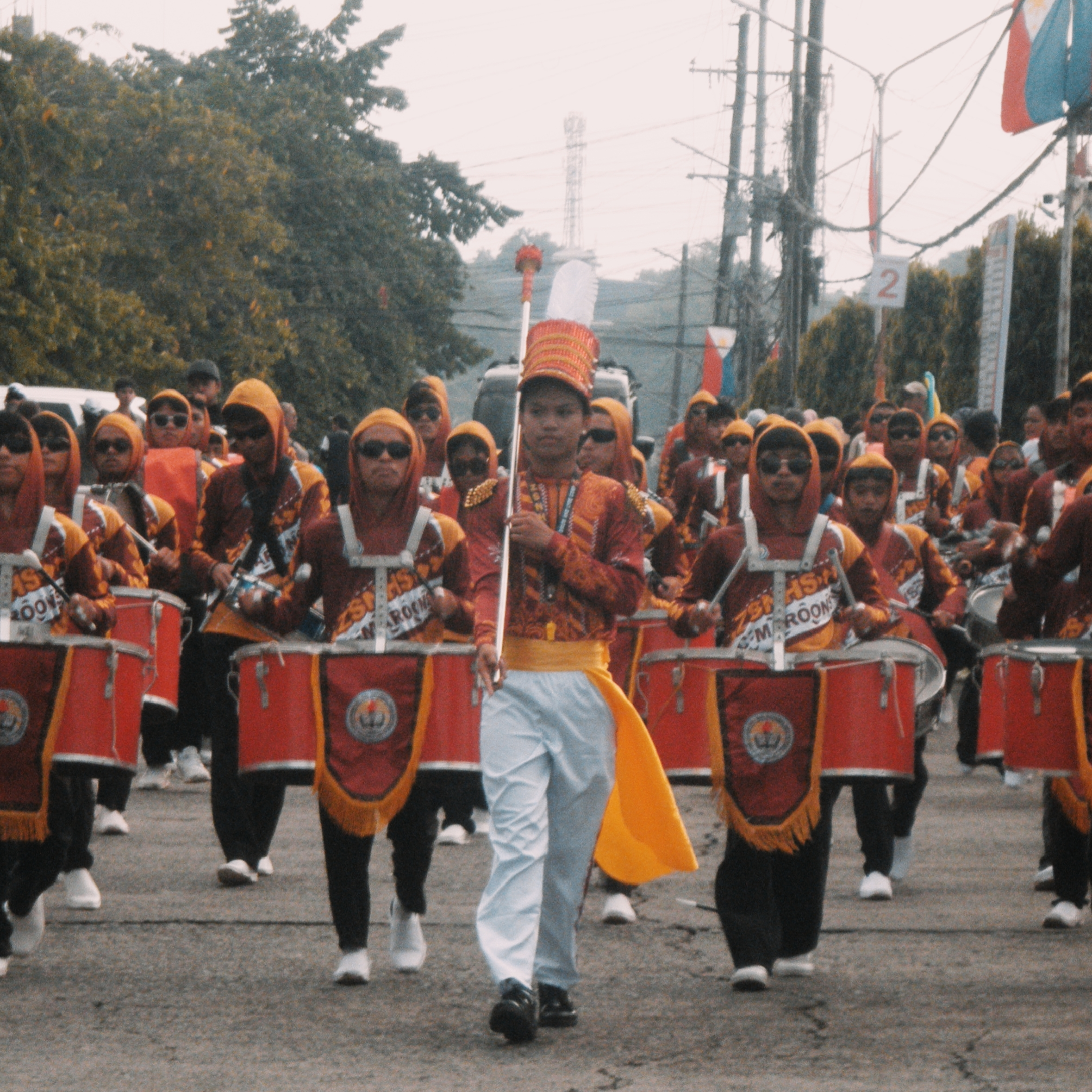
Araw Ng Pagadian Parade, led by Zamboanga Del Sur National High-School DLC Maroons, June 2026

The City Fiesta is celebrated every third Sunday of January in honor of its patron saint, the Holy Child Jesus (Santo Niño) which coincides with the feastday of Cebu City. It is officially called the Pasalamat Festival highlighted with a fluvial parade (regatta), trade exhibits, the Mutya ng Pagadian beauty pageant, carnival shows and a civic military parade. On every June 21, the Araw ng Pagadian is celebrated in commemoration of its founding as a chartered city; as Capital of Zamboanga del Sur, the city hosts the annual provincial celebration in September with agro-trade exhibits, a civic-military parade, cultural presentations and sports competitions.

The Megayon Festival is a week-long celebration that coincides with the Zamboanga del Sur anniversary in September. It honors the tri-people settlers: the Subanens, Bangsamoro Muslims and Christians. "Megayon" is a Subanen word which means "Unity and Solidarity". The festival is a showcase of three distinctly different cultural heritage in songs, dances, rituals of peace, foods and crafts, to foster unity and understanding among the three cultures. Environment-related activities, peace and development forum, and indigenous sports competitions are held.

Pagadian City also officially celebrates the Chinese New Year. It honors the local Chinese community.

== Tourism ==
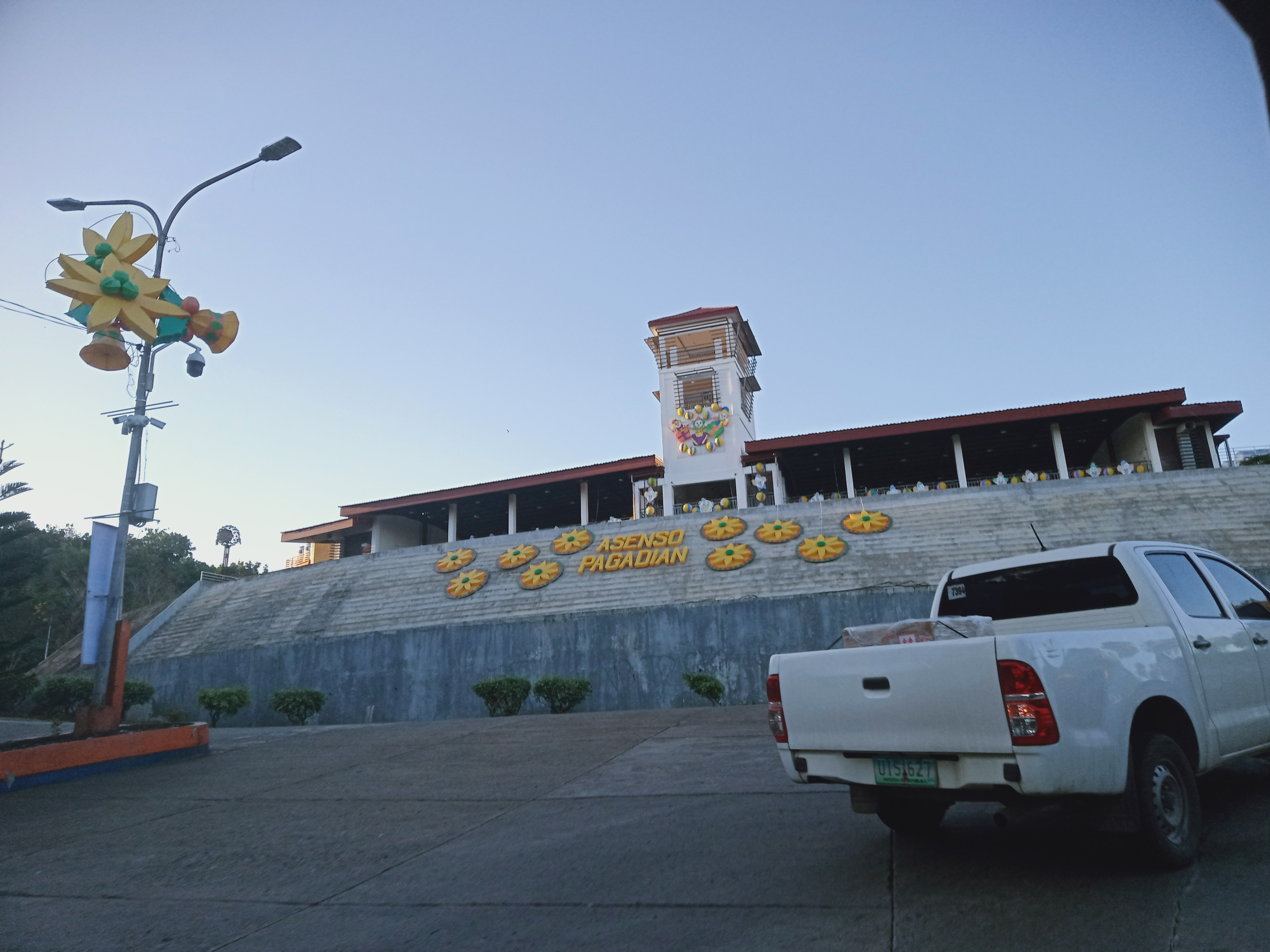
Pagadian City Rotunda View Deck Tower

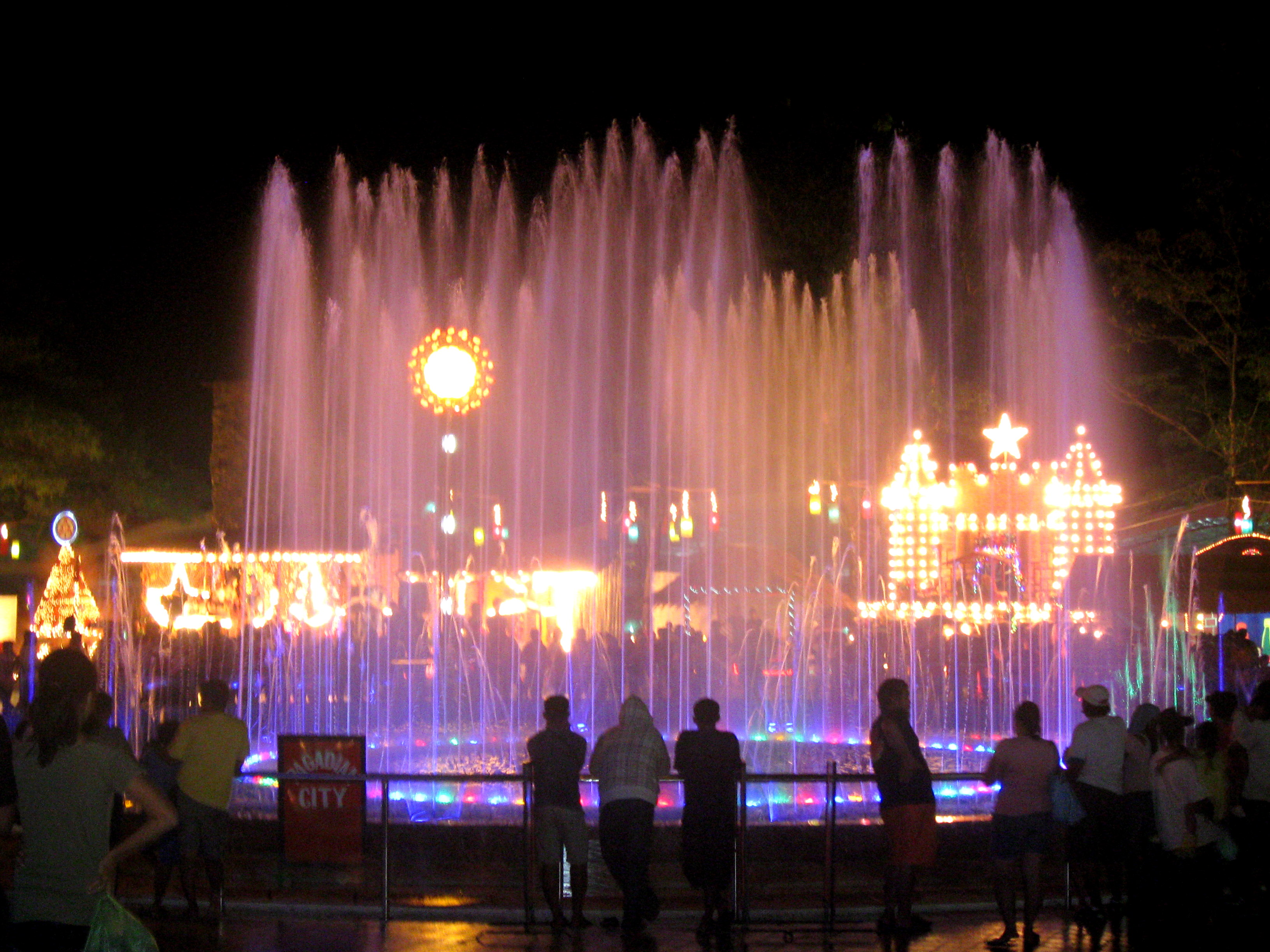
Musical Dancing Fountain in Plaza Luz, Pagadian City

The Pagadian Rotunda is a roundabout and circular park that overlooks Illana Bay where the North Diversion Road and F.S. Pajares Avenue converges, two of the three major roads in the city center (the third one being Rizal Avenue).

Plaza Luz is a park located across Pagadian City Hall. The park has a musical dancing fountain that is usually turned on at 6:00pm.

Dao Dao Islands. The name is shared by two islands within Illana Bay; thus the addition of Dako (big) and Gamay (small) to the names of the islands for simple distinction. "Dao Dao Dako" is the bigger island which is about a hectare and is about 7 to 10‑minute ride by motorboat from the seaport. It has artificial coral reefs made of old tires. "Dao Dao Gamay" is technically not an island, but a sandbar that partially submerges during high tide.

Puting Balas is the literal translation for "white sand" in the local dialect. It is classified as a white sandbar. A number of caves and waterfalls can also be found in remote barangays of the city.

The Provincial Government Complex is the civic, sports and cultural center of the province of Zamboanga del Sur of which Pagadian is the capital. A standard-sized oval track and field, standard-sized swimming pools and buildings for indoor/outdoor sports as well as a cultural village and the Unity Park, a monument to the Tri-people group (the Lumads/pre-Islamic indigenous tribes, Moslems and Christians) who settled in Pagadian, are located there.

== Government ==
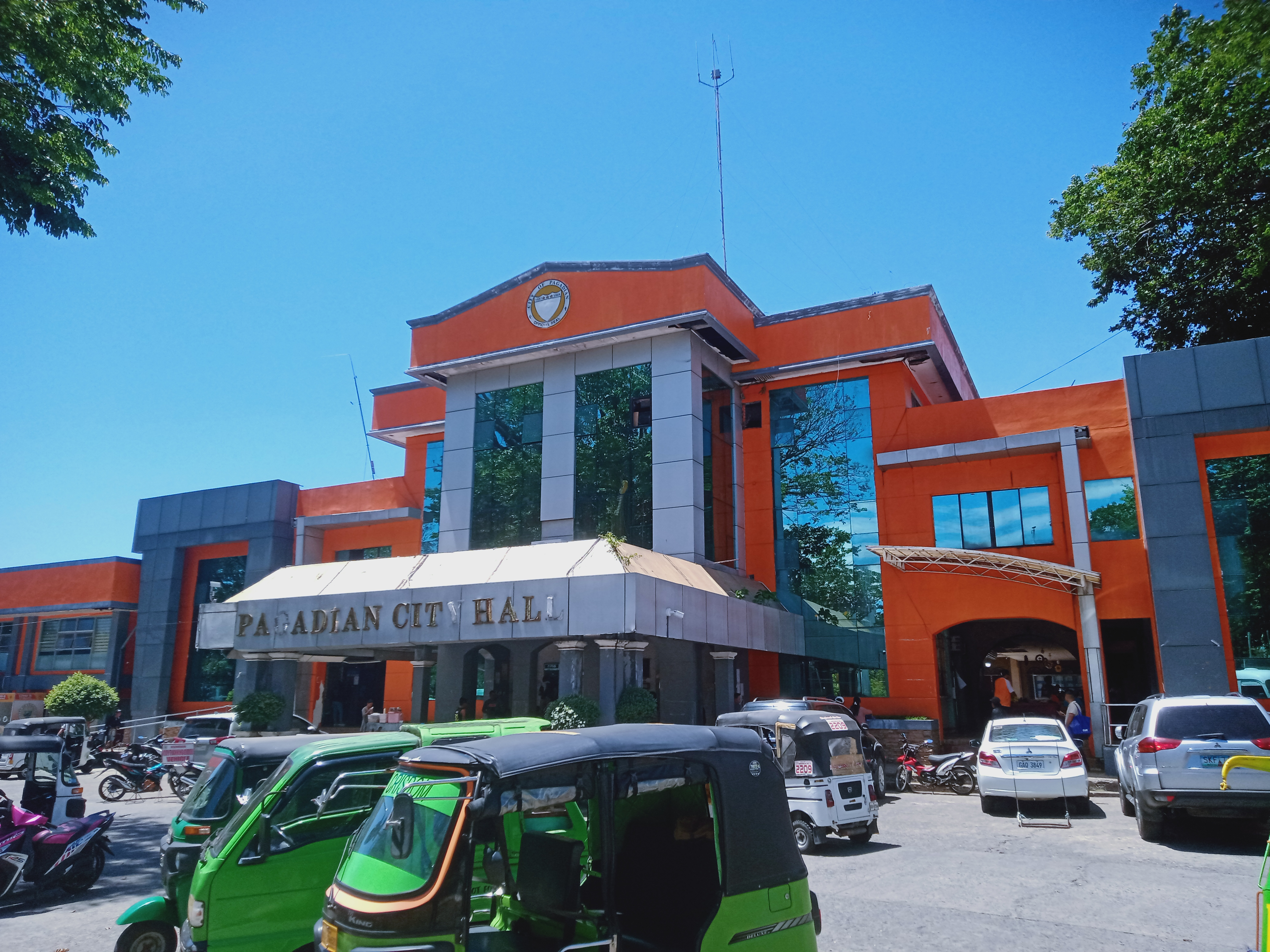
Pagadian City Hall, 2024

The city is governed by the city mayor. The local Sangguniang Panglungsod (city legislative council) is presided by the city vice mayor with ten elected councilors, and two ex-officio members from the Sangguniang Kabataan (Youth Council) and Association of Barangay Captains (ABC) respectively, as members of the council. The city mayor, vice mayor, and councilors are popularly elected to serve a three-year term.

Pagadian is also the seat of the Provincial Government of Zamboanga del Sur.

Elected officials for the 2025–2028 term are:

Members of the Pagadian City Council (2025–2028)
Position	Name	Party
Representative	Joseph C. Yu	Lakas
Mayor	Samuel S. Co	Lakas
Vice mayor	Aiko Yu To	PFP
Councilors	Roger L. Acedillo	PFP
Councilors	Jackielyn Krystyl N. Bana	PFP
Councilors	Patrisha Kaye "Kai-Kai" N. Asugas	PFP
Councilors	Dr. Ariel J. Lim Jr.	PFP
Councilors	Ma. Alicia Elena "Allen" V. Ariosa	PFP
Councilors	Ann Marjorie N. Revelo	PFP
Councilors	Maphilindo "Mapi" Q. Obaob	PFP
Councilors	Lance Samuel F. Co	NPC
Councilors	Bienvinido "Bien" C. Culve	PFP
Councilors	Ronald Christopher Glenn "Jigger" L. Ariosa	NPC

== Infrastructure ==
=== Transportation ===
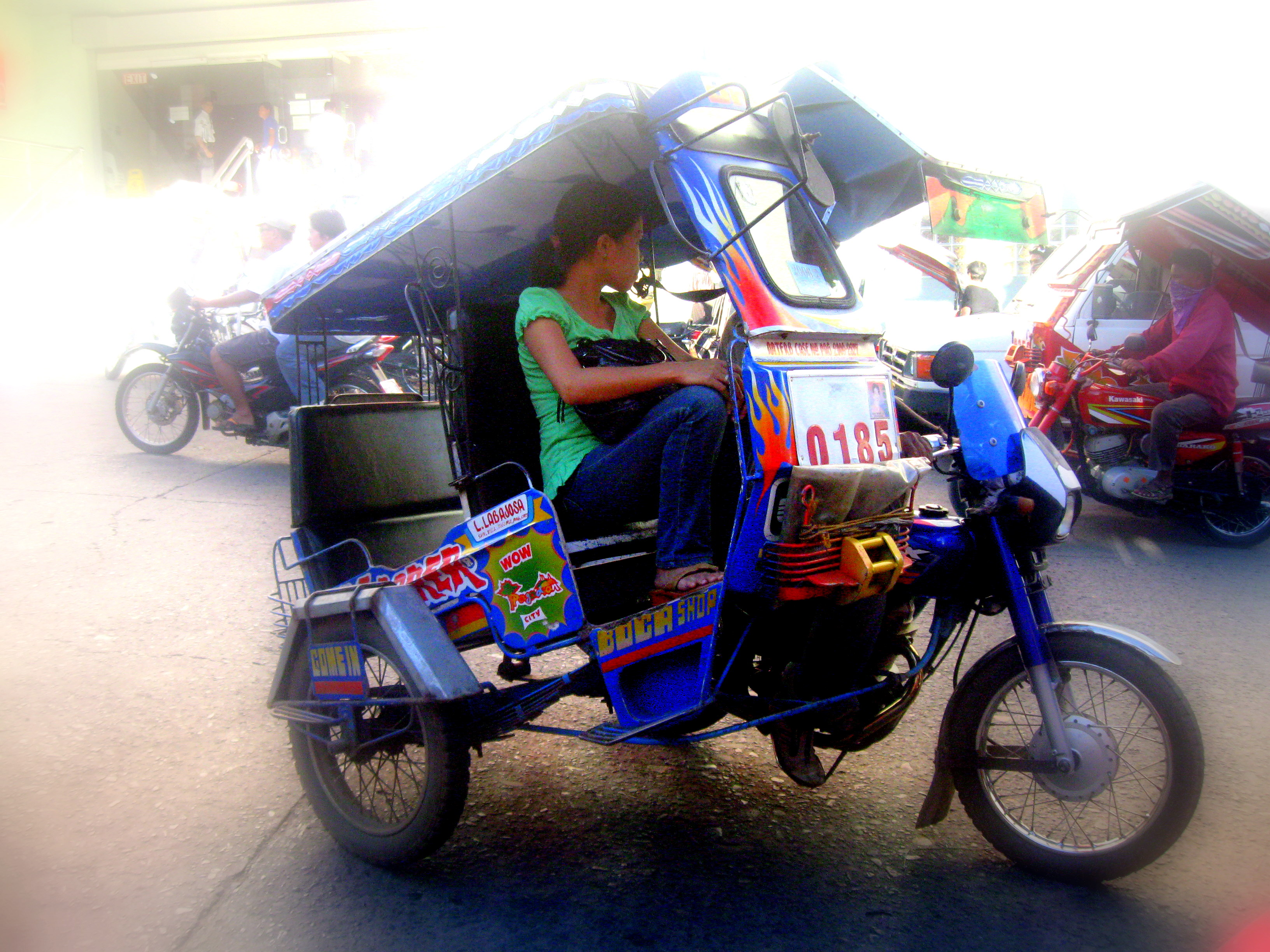
The Pagadian inclined tricycle

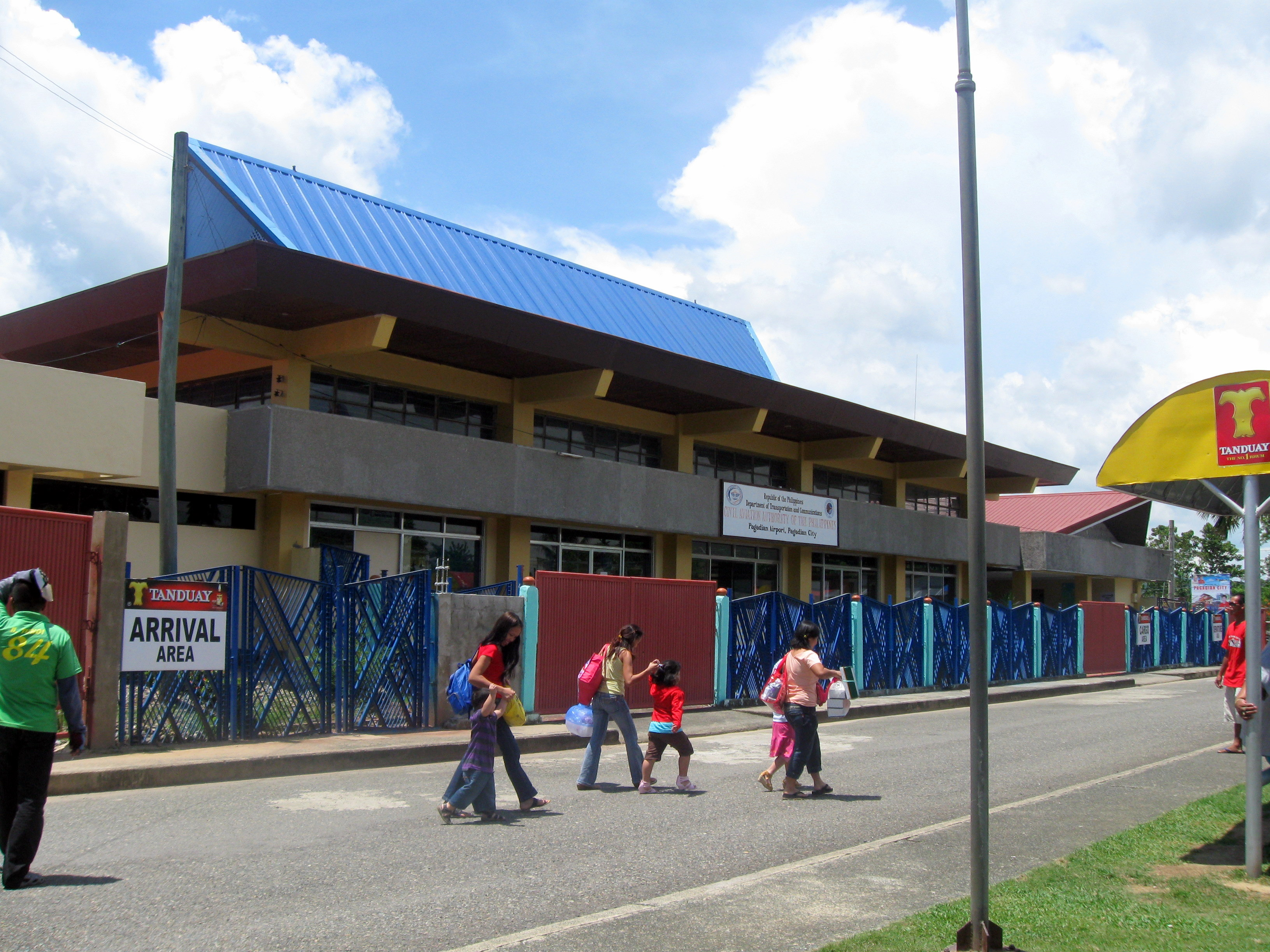
Pagadian Airport terminal facade, 2012

The tricycle or bao-bao is the primary public transport in the urban center while jeepneys ply the city's rural barangays. Private vehicles comprises the largest percentage of the traffic. Buses, minibuses, and jeepneys are the modes of transportation for transients bound for the neighboring municipalities and other parts of Zamboanga del Sur. These short-travel transports also serve the bus terminal which is located downtown.

Airport. The city is served by a Principal Airport Class 1 (or major domestic). It is located in Barangay Muricay, approximately five kilometers from the city proper. The airport serves as the only air portal in the Province of Zamboanga del Sur with direct flights to and from Manila and Cebu.

Seaport. The port of Pagadian City is served by shipping lines operating for both passenger and cargo vessels. Ports of call include Zamboanga City, Jolo and Siasi in Sulu, Bongao and Sitangkai in Tawi-tawi, and Cotabato City.

Integrated Bus Terminal (IBT-Main). Served by two major bus companies and several other smaller Public Utility Vehicles(PUVs), i.e. vans, the terminal sits atop the hill as the station for both Eastbound and Westbound transport, particularly for public transports bound for Zamboanga City, Dipolog, Cotabato City, Kidapawan City, Digos City, Davao CitY, Tacurong City, Koronadal City, and General Santos City. Integrated Bus Terminal (Annex Palacio). Served by several mini bus companies and other smaller PUVs, the terminal sits in urban Sta. Lucia District, as the station for both Eastbound and Westbound transport, particularly for public transport bound for neighboring towns especially in the Baganian Peninsula area.

=== Utilities ===
Telecommunications
Philippine Long Distance Telephone Company (PLDT) and Cruztelco are the two major telecommunications providers. A project under the Department of Transportation and Communications (DOTC), the Pagadian City Telephone Exchange (PACITELEX) serves the far-flung barangays that other telephone companies are not yet able to give service. Various cellular phone service providers in the country serve the city.

Water and power supply
Pagadian City Water District (PCWD or PAWAD) provides the city with potable water supply. Formed in 1976, PCWD has over 14,000 active service connections and sources its water from deep wells and springs.

Electricity
Electricity is supplied by the Zamboanga del Sur I Electric Cooperative, Incorporated (ZAMSURECO I) from the National Power Corporation Hydro-Electric Plant in Iligan City, sourced from the Maria Cristina Falls. About 77.70% or 42 out of 54 total barangays in the entire city have 24-hour supply of electricity.

== Education ==
Educational institutions in Pagadian:

As of 2026, there are 70 elementary schools (61 public, 9 private) 34 high schools (24 public, 10 private) and 17 colleges, with around 65,000 to 75,000 students.

Elementary Schools:

- Alegria Elementary School
- Bagong Silang Elementary School
- Balangasan Central Elementary School
- Balintawak Elementary School
- Ballesteros Sr. Elementary School
- Baloyboan Elementary School
- Banale Elementary School
- Ben Sagun Memorial Elementary School
- Bentud Pinukis Penintuluan Nu Piksalabukan Subanen Elementary School
- Bogo Integrated School - Elementary Department
- Bomba Elementary School
- Buenavista Elementary School
- Bulatok Elementary School
- Bulawan Integrated School - Elementary Department
- Camp Abelon Elementary School
- Campo Islam Elementary School
- Dampalan Elementary School
- Danlugan Elementary School
- Dao Elementary School
- Deborok Elementary School
- Ditoray Integrated School - Elementary Department
- Dominador Yocogo Sr. Integrated School - Elementary Department
- Dumagoc Elementary School
- Dumalian Integrated School
- Gubak Elementary School
- Gubang Integrated School
- Kagawasan Integrated School
- Kahayagan Elementary School
- Kalasan Integrated School - Elementary Department
- Kawit Elementary School
- La Suerte Elementary School
- Lala Elementary School
- Lapedian Elementary School
- Lenienza Elementary School
- Lison Valley Elementary School
- Lourdes Elementary School
- Lower Sibatang Elementary School
- Lumad Elementary School
- Macasing Elementary School
- Manga Elementary School
- Muricay Elementary School
- Napolan Elementary School
- Nazareth Elementary School
- Pablo Litigio Elementary School
- Pagadian City Pilot School (PCPS)
- Palpalan Elementary School
- Pedulonan Elementary School
- Poloyagan Integrated School
- Rotary Inner Wheel Village Elementary School
- San Jose Elementary School
- San Pedro Central Elementary School
- Saint Columban College Grade School
- Sta. Lucia Central Elementary School
- Sto. Niño Elementary School
- Tata Mong Elementary School
- Tawagan Sur Elementary School
- Tiguma Elementary School
- Tomas Sagun Integrated School (TSIS) - Elementary Department
- Tuburan Central Elementary School
- Tulangan Integrated School
- Tulawas Integrated School
- Upper Sibatang Elementary School
- Warlito E. Pulmones Elementary School
- White Beach Elementary School
- Zamboanga del Sur School for Arts (ZDSSA) - Elementary Department

Junior and Senior High Schools:

- Pagadian Junior College Incorporated (PJCI)
- Pagadian Montessori Center Incorporated (PMCI)
- Pagadian City Science High School (PagSci)
- Pagadian City Salvation and Praise Learning Center (PCSPLC)
- Zamboanga del Sur National High School (ZSNHS)
- Holy Child Academy (HCA)
- Zamboanga del Sur School for Arts (ZDSSA) - Junior and Senior High Department
- Zamboanga del Sur School of Arts and Trades (ZSSAT)
- Co Tek Chun National Trade School
- Pagadian City National High School - Danlugan Campus (PCNHS)
- Saint Columban College - Junior and Senior High Department (SCC - JHS & SHS)
- Pagadian City National Comprehensive High School (PCNCHS)
- Norberta Bana Guillar Memorial High School
- Otto Lingue High School
- San Pedro National High School
- Napolan National High School
- Lison Valley National High School
- Macasing National High School
- Manga National High School
- STI Colleges - Pagadian - Senior High Department
- Universal College of Southeast Asia - Senior High Department

Colleges:

- Medina College-Pagadian
- Saint Columban College
- Southern Mindanao Colleges
- Western Mindanao State University - External Studies Unit
- Universidad de Zamboanga - Pagadian Campus
- Pagadian Capitol College
- Eastern Mindanao College of Technology
- Zoom Vocational & Technical School
- West Prime Horizon Institute (SHS & college)
- Our Lady of Triumph Institute of Technology (OLT)
- Yllana Bay View College
- Pagadian City International College (PCIC)
- Zamboanga del Sur, Pagadian Capitol College
- J.H. Cerilles State College (JHCSC)
- Southeast Asian Institute Pagadian City Campus
- Lucan Review Colleges
- Pagadian International College of Philsouth Inc. (senior HS and college)

== Media ==
=== AM radio stations ===
- DXPR 603 RMN Pagadian (Radio Mindanao Network)
- DXBZ 756 Radyo Bagting (Baganian Broadcasting Corporation)
- DXKP 1377 Radyo Ronda (Radio Philippines Network)

=== FM radio stations ===
- 91.1 Voice Radio (Kaissar Broadcasting Network)
- 91.9 Radyo Natin (Manila Broadcasting Company)
- 93.5 FMR (Philippine Collective Media Corporation)
- 94.1 Radio One (MIT Radio-TV Network, Inc.)
- 96.7 iFM (Radio Mindanao Network)
- 98.3 Energy FM (Ultrasonic Broadcasting System)
- 99.1 Muews Radio (Sagay Broadcasting Corporation)
- 99.9 Radyo Bisdak (Times Broadcasting Network Corporation)
- 103.1 Radyo Kidlat (Zamboanga del Sur I Electric Cooperative, Inc.; affiliated with Philippine Broadcasting Service)
- 103.9 LCM FM (Subic Broadcasting Corporation; operated by Loud Cry Ministries)
- 104.7 Radyo Sakto (Malindang Broadcasting Network Corporation)
- 105.7 Brigada News FM (Baycomms Broadcasting Corporation/Brigada Mass Media Corporation)
- 106.3 Bell FM (Baganian Broadcasting Corporation)
- 107.1 Juander Radyo (Capitol Broadcasting Center; operated by RSV Broadcasting Services)
- 88.7 CocoyBags Radio
- 101.5 DXID-FM Islamic Radio

=== TV stations ===
- GMA Channel 3 Pagadian
- GTV Channel 26 Pagadian
- PTV - 11 Peoples Television Network

=== Cable and satellite providers ===
- Kismet Cable TV
- Unique Cable TV
- Cignal TV
- SatLite
- G Sat

== Notable people ==
- Antonio Cerilles - former secretary of the Department of Environment and Natural Resources (DENR) during the term of President Joseph Estrada (1998–2001); governor of Zamboanga del Sur 2010–2019
- Mateo Olivar - Catholic church worker of the Diocese of Pagadian; assassinated during the Marcos dictatorship; one of the first to be formally acknowledged as a martyr of the religious sector's resistance against the Marcos dictatorship at the Philippines' Bantayog ng mga Bayani
- Enrique Ona - former secretary of health (2010–2014); former executive director of the National Kidney and Transplant Institute
- Felip Jhon Suson - Filipino rapper, singer-songwriter, dancer, and producer; main dancer, lead rapper, and lead vocalist of the Filipino boy band SB19
- Felip - singer; currently member of boy group band SB19
- Divina Grace Yu - current governor of Zamboanga del Sur; former vice mayor of Pagadian and 1st district representative of Zamboanga del Sur
- Victor Yu - governor of Zamboanga del Sur 2019–2025

== Sister cities ==
- Cooma, New South Wales, Australia - established in 1975 through the Philippine-Australian Development Assistance Programme (PADAP) being with the contract with the Snowy Mountains Engineering Corporation, based in the City of Cooma, which undertook development projects within the province of Zamboanga del Sur
- Koronadal City
- San Juan, Metro Manila - Agreement was made on July 1, 2026, between the incumbent mayors of both cities.
