= Vincenzo Sagun =

Filipino lawyer and politician

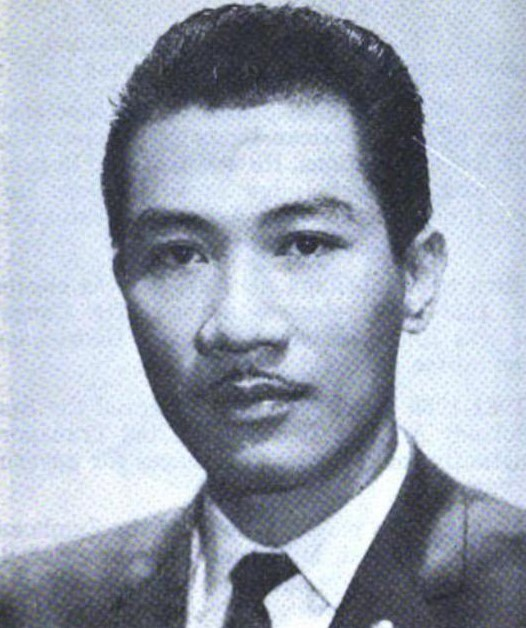
- Sagun's official portrait during the 6th Congress

Member of the Philippine House of Representatives from Zamboanga del Sur's at-large district
- In office December 30, 1961 – December 30, 1969
- Preceded by: Canuto Enerio
- Succeeded by: Vicente Cerilles

Vice Governor of Zamboanga del Sur
- In office December 30, 1955 – December 30, 1959
- Governor: Bienvenido Ebarle
- Preceded by: Javier Ariosa
- Succeeded by: Vicente Cerilles

Personal details
- Born: September 9, 1928 Labangan, Zamboanga del Sur, Philippine Islands
- Party: Liberal (from 1955)
- Spouse: Aleli Lim Aliñabon
- Children: 3
- Education: Silliman University (LLB); Academy of American Law (LLM)

Vincenzo Almonte Sagun (September 9, 1928 – after 1969) was a Filipino lawyer and politician who served as the representative for Zamboanga del Sur's at-large congressional district in the Philippine House of Representatives from 1961 until 1969. A member of the Liberal Party, he previously served as vice governor of Zamboanga del Sur from 1955 to 1959.

== Early life and education ==
Vincenzo Almonte Sagun was born on September 9, 1928, in Labangan, Zamboanga del Sur, to Tomas Sagun and Rosario Almonte. He attended the Manuel L. Quezon School of Law on a collegiate scholarship and received his Bachelor of Laws degree from Silliman University in 1953. He was awarded the Percy Hodgson Rotary International Scholarship and the Wentworth Uytengsu Memorial Scholarship. He placed sixth in the 1953 Bar examinations, with a rating of 92.55 percent.

As a lawyer, Sagun received scholarships in law and jurisprudence from the Southwestern Legal Foundation of the United States and the Ford Foundation. He later obtained his Master of Laws degree, graduating second highest in his class from the Academy of American Law in Dallas, Texas. During his stay in the United States, he was frequently invited as a guest speaker by American Lions Clubs, church groups, women's organizations, and bar associations. He was also featured in radio and television interviews with Texas District Judge Sarah Hughes. He also addressed the chief justice and associate justices of the Supreme Court of Texas.

== Vice Governor of Zamboanga del Sur (1955–1959) ==
Upon his return to Zamboanga del Sur, Sagun was elected vice governor in 1955, serving until 1959.

== House of Representatives (1961–1969) ==
Sagun was first elected to the House of Representatives in 1961 under the Liberal Party, serving in the 5th Congress, during which he served as House assistant majority floor leader and chairman of the House Committee on Good Government. During his first term, he co-authored key legislation, including Republic Act No. 5182, amending the Spanish Language Law; Republic Act No. 3452, or the Rice Subsidy Act; and Republic Act No. 4136, creating the Land Transportation Commission.

He also authored measures benefiting government employees, schoolteachers, and workers. He was re-elected in 1965, serving in the 6th Congress until 1969.

Sagun delivered the nominating speech in support of Cornelio Villareal's re-election as House speaker in January 1966.

== Personal life and legacy ==
Sagun was married to Aleli Lim Aliñabon, a niece of former Senator Roseller T. Lim, with whom he had three children.

The municipality of Vincenzo A. Sagun in Zamboanga del Sur was named in his honor.

House of Representatives of the Philippines
Preceded by Canuto Enerio	Member of the Philippine House of Representatives for Zamboanga del Sur's at-large district 1961–1969	Succeeded by Vicente Cerilles
Political offices
Preceded by Javier Ariosa	Vice Governor Zamboanga del Sur; 1955–1959	Succeeded by Vicente Cerilles
