= Ranillo =

Ranillo is a surname which is predominantly found in the Philippines. Notable people with the name include:

- Krista Ranillo (born 1984), Filipino actress and great-granddaughter of Matias Sr.
- Matias Ranillo Sr. (1898–1947), Filipino politician
- Mat Ranillo III (born 1956), Filipino-born American actor and grandson of Matias Sr.
- Suzette Ranillo (born 1961), Filipino actress and granddaughter of Matias Sr.

== See also ==
- Ranollo
