= List of streets in Zamboanga del Norte =

Streets of Philippines

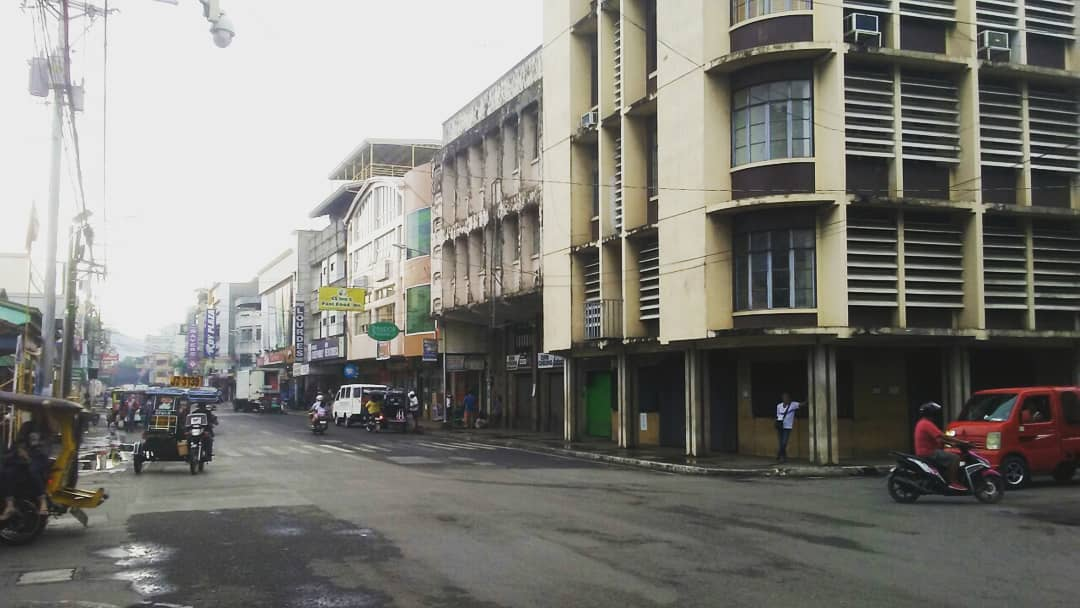
Rizal Avenue in downtown Dipolog

This is a partial list of streets in Zamboanga del Norte, Philippines.

== Dapitan ==
| Street Name | Namesake | City |
|---|---|---|
| Jose Rizal Avenue | Jose Rizal | Dapitan |
| Don Francisco Mercado Street | Francisco Rizal Mercado, Jose Rizal's father | Dapitan |
| Andres Bonifacio Avenue | Andres Bonifacio, founder of the Katipunan | Dapitan |
| F. Blumentritt Street | Ferdinand Blumentritt, Austrian scholar | Dapitan |
| Dr. Heinz Luetke Street | Dr. Heinz Luetke | Dapitan |
| Gov. Carnicero Street | Ricardo Carnicero, the Spanish politico-military governor of Dapitan | Dapitan |
| F. Sanchez Street | Francisco de Paula Sanchez, Jose Rizal's professor and companion during his exile in Dapitan | Dapitan |
| Datu Pagbuwaya Street | Datu Pagbuaya, a local chieftain | Dapitan |
| Don Pedro Manooc Street | Pedro Manooc, son of Datu Pagbuwaya | Dapitan |
| Maria Uray Lane | Maria Uray, daughter of Pedro Manooc | Dapitan |
| Crisostomo Ibarra Street | named after the protagonist in the novel Noli Me Tangere, Juan Crisostomo Ibarra | Dapitan |
| Leonor Rivera Street | Leonor Rivera, Jose Rizal's childhood sweetheart | Dapitan |
| Josephine Bracken Street | Josephine Bracken, Jose Rizal's common-law wife | Dapitan |
| Mi Retiro Street | named after the poem Mi Retiro (Spanish for My Retreat) | Dapitan |
| Gov. Guading Adaza Street | Guadalupe "Guading" Adaza, Governor of Zamboanga del Norte (1955; 1959-1963) | Dapitan |
| Justice Florentino Saguin Street | Florentino Saguin, jurist, co-founder of Banco Dipolog, and former Governor of Zamboanga Province (1922-1925) | Dapitan |
| Don Hospicio Ochotorena Street | | Dapitan |
| Doña Trinidad Rizal Street | Trinidad Rizal, Jose Rizal's sister | Dapitan |
| Jose Aseniero Street | Jose Dalman Aseniero, one of Jose Rizal's students in Dapitan | Dapitan |
| Noli Me Tangere Street | named after the novel Noli Me Tangere | Dapitan |
| El Filibusterismo Road | named after the novel El Filibusterismo | Dapitan |

== Dipolog ==
| Street Name | Namesake | City |
|---|---|---|
| Rizal Avenue (historically Calle Rosario) | Dr. Jose Protacio Rizal/Our Lady of the Most Holy Rosary | Dipolog |
| Bonifacio Street | Andres de Castro Bonifacio | Dipolog |
| Quezon Avenue | President Manuel Luis Quezon y Molina | Dipolog |
| Osmeña Street | President Sergio Suico Osmeña Sr. | Dipolog |
| Magsaysay Street/Extension | President Ramon del Fierro Magsaysay | Dipolog |
| C. P. Garcia Street | President Carlos Polistico Garcia | Dipolog |
| Gen. Luna Street | General Antonio Novicio Ancheta Luna | Dipolog |
| Mabini Street | Apolinario Maranan Mabini | Dipolog |
| P. Burgos Street | Father Jose Apolonio Garcia Burgos | Dipolog |
| P. Gomez Street | Father Mariano Gomez | Dipolog |
| P. Zamora Street | Father Jacinto del Rosario Zamora | Dipolog |
| Lopez Jaena Street | Graciano Lopez Jaena | Dipolog |
| Arellano Street/Extension | Justice Cayetano Lonzon Arellano | Dipolog |
| M. H. del Pilar Street | Marcelo Hidalgo Gatmaitan del Pilar | Dipolog |
| Lapu-Lapu Street | Lapu-Lapu | Dipolog |
| Malvar Street/Extension | General Miguel Carpio Malvar | Dipolog |
| Tomas Claudio Street (often shortened as T. Claudio Street) | Private Tomas Mateo Claudio | Dipolog |
| Martinez Street (historically Boholano Street) | Pascual Tan Martinez, Mayor of Dipolog (1913-1921)/After the migrated Boholano settlers who lived in the town | Dipolog |
| Ortega Street | Paciano J. Ortega, Mayor of Dipolog (1922) | Dipolog |
| Bendijo Street | Gaudencio Bendijo, Mayor of Dipolog (3 months in 1922) | Dipolog |
| Echavez Street/Extension | Isabelo Z. Echavez, Mayor of Dipolog (1922-1925) | Dipolog |
| Lailay Street | Gerino Zorilla Lailay, Mayor of Dipolog (1930-1937) | Dipolog |
| Gonzales Street (formerly Jones Street) | Geronimo Gonzales, Mayor of Dipolog (1926-1927)/William Atkinson Jones, American legislator and author of the Jones Act | Dipolog |
| F. B. Lacaya Street/Extension (often shortened as F. Lacaya Street, formerly Balintawak Street) | Felipe Belarmino Lacaya, Mayor of Dipolog (1928)/After the Cry of Pugad Lawin in Balintawak | Dipolog |
| Calibo Street (formerly Wilson Street) | Vicente Calibo, Mayor of Dipolog (1938-1946)/US President Woodrow Wilson | Dipolog |
| Kagatan Road | Fermin D. Kagatan, Mayor of Dipolog (1946-1955) | Dipolog |
| Herrera Street | Felicisimo L. Herrera, Mayor of Dipolog (1963-1969 as municipal mayor; 1970-1978 as city mayor) | Dipolog |
| Katipunan Street | Katipunan | Dipolog |
| Padre Ramon Street (often shortened as P. Ramon Street) | Father Jose A. Ramon | Dipolog |
| Tabiliran Street (formerly Biak-na-Bato Street) | Capitan Basilio Tabiliran/After the Pact of Biak-na-Bato of 1897. | Dipolog |
| C. Sorronda Road | Gobernadorcillo Cirilo Sorronda | Dipolog |
| M. Velasco Street (Note: Ordinance No. 96-102) | Gobernadorcillo Matias Velasco | Dipolog |
| Estaka Street | named after the barangay where the street is located | Dipolog |
| Capitol Avenue | named after the fact, the road (although disputed) is situated behind the Zamboanga del Norte Provincial Capitol. | Dipolog |
| Capitol Drive (Note: Ordinance No. 02-161) | named as it is situated beside the Legislative Building at the Zamboanga del Norte Provincial Capitol. | Dipolog |
| Aguilar Street | Atty. Zorro Campos Aguilar, human rights lawyer | Dipolog |
| Amatong Street | Jacobo Sybico Amatong, lawyer and Dipolog City councilor | Dipolog |
| Ranillo Street (formerly Lincoln Street) | Matias Castillon Ranillo Sr., Governor and, later, Representative of Zamboanga province/US President Abraham Lincoln | Dipolog |
| Fr. N. Patangan Road (Note: Ordinance No. 96-103) | Rev. Fr. Nicasio Yebes Patangan, the first diocesan priest of Mindanao | Dipolog |
| Gen. John J. Pershing Highway | John Joseph Pershing, American military general and governor of the Department of Mindanao and Sulu | Dipolog |
| Mayor Pastor Bajamunde Road | Pastor Ranillo Bajamunde, Mayor of Dipolog (1956-1959) | Dipolog |
| Felix Bastasa Road | Felix Bastasa, barangay captain of Santa Filomena (1972-1986) | Dipolog |
| Pablo Canturias Road | Pablo Canturias, barangay captain of Santa Filomena (1968-1971) | Dipolog |
| Isaias Uy Road | Isaias Ang Uy, Filipino-Chinese businessman | Dipolog |
| Andres Dacua Road | Andres Dacua, teniente del barrio of Santa Filomena (1963-1968) | Dipolog |
| Nelson Saldon Road | Nelson Saldon, barangay captain of Santa Filomena (2004-2013) | Dipolog |
| Gov. Felipe Azcuna Road | Felipe B. Azcuna, Governor of Zamboanga province (1940-1941; 1948-1949) and present-day Zamboanga del Norte (1952-1955; 1963-1967) | Dipolog |
| Gov. Alberto Ubay Road | Alberto Quilantang Ubay, Governor of Zamboanga del Norte (1980-1986) | Dipolog |
| Justice Guardson Lood Road | Guardson R. Lood, jurist, Assemblyman of the Regular Batasang Pambansa for Zamboanga del Norte's at-large district (1984-1986) | Dipolog |
| Eugenio Margate Road | Eugenio Redulla Margate, Dipolognon farmer who introduced the "Margate System of Planting Rice" | Dipolog |
| Dr. Santiago Calo Road | Santiago Sanchez Calo, Sr., World War II-era medical practitioner | Dipolog |
| Anahaw Road | named after the purok in Galas and the plant abundant in the area | Dipolog |
| Lobing Ogis Road | named after the purok in Galas | Dipolog |
| Paraiso Road | named after the sitio in Galas | Dipolog |
| Banicapt Road | named after the purok in Galas | Dipolog |
| Riverside Road | named as the road leads to the namesake purok in Olingan | Dipolog |
| San Vicente Road | named as the road passes behind a church in Olingan dedicated to Saint Vincent Ferrer | Dipolog |
| Fisheries Road | named as the road leads to the Olingan-based Dipolog School of Fisheries | Dipolog |
| Olingan Central Road | named as the road passes through Olingan's central area | Dipolog |
| Charcoal Drive | named as to connote the making of charcoal, hence the Visayan term and barangay name of "Olingan" | Dipolog |
| Fishermen Lane | named as the path leads to the beach for Olingan fisherfolks to catch fish | Dipolog |
| South Point Road | named as it "points" south from Olingan to Punta | Dipolog |
| Buli Road | named after a plant abundant in the area of Minaog | Dipolog |
| Bayugo Road | named after a plant abundant in the area of Minaog | Dipolog |
| Puting Bato Road | named after a landmark known to locals in the area due to its white rocky formation | Dipolog |
| Pangadlaw Road | named after a locally-endemic variant of orchids | Dipolog |
| One Heart Road | named as it passes by the abandoned One Heart Dipolog Cockpit | Dipolog |
| Surf Road | named after Surf Beach in Miputak | Dipolog |
| Seaport Road | named as it passes by the Port of Dipolog | Dipolog |
| Ramos Village Road | named after the namesake village in Sta. Filomena | Dipolog |
| Sicayab Circumferential Road | named after the barangay where the road is located | Dipolog |

== Manukan ==
| Street Name | Namesake | City |
|---|---|---|
| Francesco Palliola Street | Father Francesco Palliola | Manukan |
| P. Tiu Street | Prudencio C. Tiu, Sr., Mayor of Manukan (1952-1962) | Manukan |
| Sagario Street | | Manukan |

== Polanco ==
| Street Name | Namesake | City |
|---|---|---|
| Dr. Jose Rizal Street | Jose Rizal | Polanco |
| M. Quezon Street | President Manuel Quezon | Polanco |
| E. Quirino Street | President Elpidio Quirino | Polanco |
| Pres. D. Macapagal Street | President Diosdado Macapagal | Polanco |
| 8 de Deciembre Street | | Polanco |
| B. Ocupe Street | | Polanco |
| Fr. Romero Street | | Polanco |
| New Society Road | Bagong Lipunan | Polanco |

== Siayan ==
| Street Name | Namesake | City |
|---|---|---|
| E. Aguinaldo Street | President Emilio Famy Aguinaldo | Siayan |
| J.P. Rizal Street | Jose Rizal | Siayan |
| Osmeña Street | President Sergio Suico Osmeña, Sr. | Siayan |
| Magsaysay Street | President Ramon del Fierro Magsaysay | Siayan |
| A.B. Siasico Street | Abundio B. Siasico, Sr., Mayor of Sindangan (1954-1957) and Siayan (1967-1985) | Siayan |
| Ladiagonong Street | | Siayan |
| Alumbre Street | | Siayan |
| Adaza Street | | Siayan |
| J. Lanticse Street | | Siayan |

== Siocon ==
| Street Name | Namesake | City |
|---|---|---|
| Magsaysay Avenue | President Ramon del Fierro Magsaysay | Siocon |
| D. Riconalla Street | Dionisio E. Riconalla, Mayor of Siocon (1936-1938, 1942-1946) | Siocon |
| Tomboc Street | | Siocon |
