= Dipolog Airport =

Airport in Zamboanga del Norte, Philippines

Dipolog Airport Tugpahanan sa Dipolog Paliparan ng Dipolog
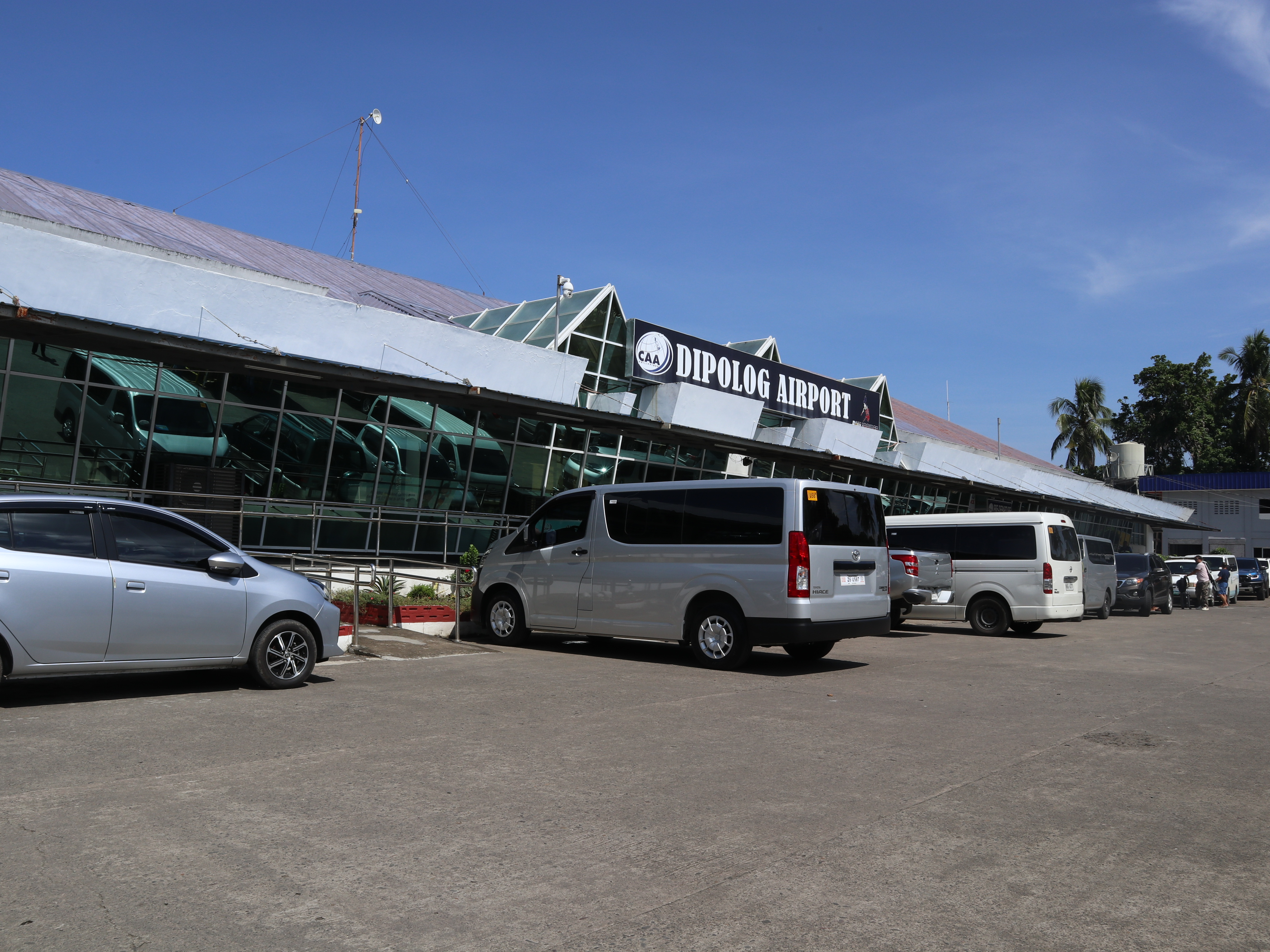
- Exterior of Dipolog Airport, 2023
- IATA: DPL; ICAO: RPMG; WMO: 98741

Summary
- Airport type: Public
- Owner/Operator: Civil Aviation Authority of the Philippines
- Serves: Dipolog
- Opened: October 1941; 84 years ago
- Elevation AMSL: 4 m (13 ft)
- Coordinates: 08°36′5″N 123°20′31″E

Map
- Interactive map of Dipolog Airport

Runways
| Direction | Length | | Surface |
| Direction | m | ft | Surface |
|---|---|---|---|
| 02/20 | 1,883 | 6,178 | Asphalt |

Statistics (2021)
- Passengers: 71,487
- Aircraft movements: 2,638
- Cargo (in kgs): 1,347,999
- Source: CAAP

Dipolog Airport (IATA: DPL, ICAO: RPMG) is the main airport serving the general area of Dipolog, the capital city of Zamboanga del Norte, in the Philippines. The airport is one of the busiest in Mindanao, especially considering its classification. It is classified as a Class 1 principal (major domestic) by the Civil Aviation Authority of the Philippines (CAAP), a body of the Department of Transportation (DOTr) responsible for the operations of airports in the Philippines except the major international ones.

In 2005, the airport handled 75,751 passengers. Its passenger traffic has grown at least 52% from year 2000 statistical figures with an average annual growth rate of around 10.4%.

== History ==
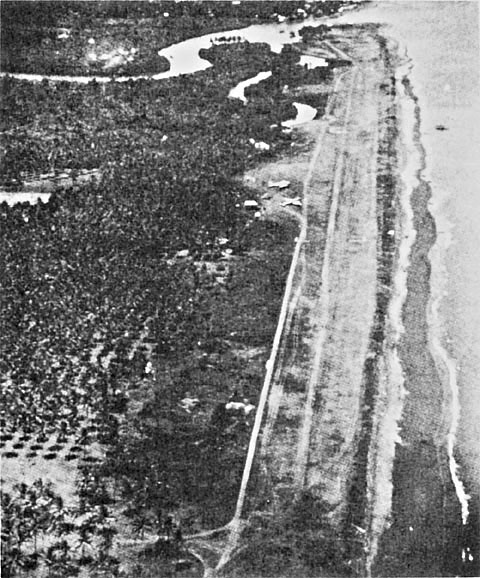
Aerial view of Dipolog Field in 1945

During the incumbency of Matias C. Ranillo Sr. as Governor of Zamboanga peninsula in 1937-1941, President Manuel Quezon and his daughters Zenaida and Aurora "Baby", were invited to inaugurate the opening of the first bridge linking Dipolog to nearby Dapitan in 1939. The bridge stands to this day as the Quezon Bridge.

The 600-meter (2,000 ft) macadam airstrip was opened in October 1941, a few months before the outbreak of World War II, by then-Vice President Sergio Osmeña and Chief of Staff Basilio Valdez. They inaugurated the airport on a flight on board a Douglas DC-2 of the Philippine Army Air Corps (PAAC). They were welcomed by Governor Ranillo but the entourage promptly proceeded to the Dipolog Parish for a thanksgiving mass since the plane almost crashed at landing. Father Nicasio Yebes Patangan was the officiating priest.

=== Development ===
C-47 Skytrain 1945

The original terminal was made of composite wood material at the northern side of the runway near the Philippine Constabulary Camp, now Camp Hamac in Sicayab. During World War II, the field was overrun by rank grass. It was still used by Col. Hipolito Garma's guerrilla 105th Division, as a re-supply base for Wendell Fertig's guerrillas and as an emergency landing field. In October 1944, Governor Ranillo led the Dipolognons to clear the runway at the request of the Filipino guerrilla forces. By March 8, four divisions of 16 Vought F4U Corsair US Marine fighter bombers and the 13th US Air Force established base as part of the Victor IV liberation plan. They covered the landing of the 41st Infantry Division in Zamboanga on D-day scheduled on March 10. It was completely restored in 1947 with the construction of a longer runway and bigger terminal that was relocated to the eastern side of runway 20. A new access road was also constructed, complementing its facility.

Commercial operation by Philippine Airlines commenced in 1952 using a Douglas DC-3 aircraft for routes to and from Cebu City and Zamboanga City. Concreting and expansion of the runway was made in 1974 when a new taxiway and apron was built. A new terminal building was constructed in 1980, relocating the old terminal to where it stands to this day. A bigger parking area and new access road was opened with the new terminal. A control tower was added in 1991, and new runway lights were installed in 2004.

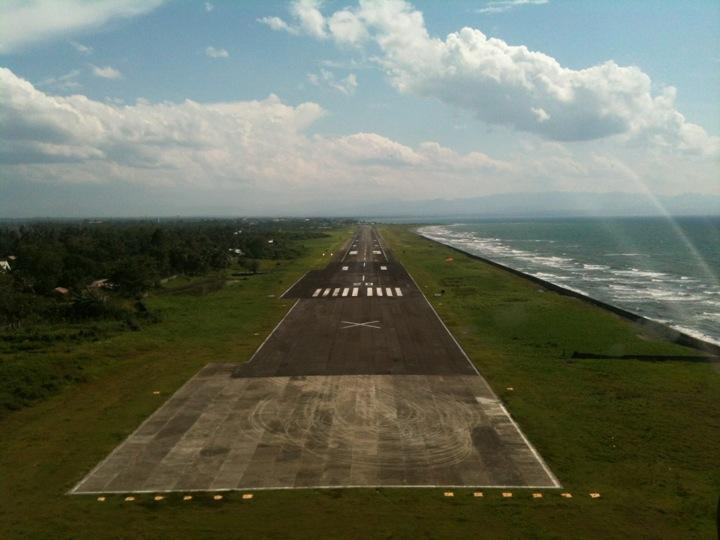
The runway

The airport's strategic location during World War II and the liberation of Zamboanga and Mindanao by American and Philippine Commonwealth Forces in 1945 prompted the national government to develop the field as an alternate to Zamboanga International Airport principally for national security reasons arising from natural and man-made emergencies. This was made apparent during the tumultuous period of the Muslim Rebellion in the early 1970s. Its infrastructure at that time was testament to its strategic importance.

=== Commercial traffic ===
The late 1980s saw a dramatic upsurge in foreign tourist arrival. Aerolift Philippines launched flights to Manila using a Beechcraft 1900-C aircraft in 1987.

The airport's commercial viability for growth was established as more flights were mounted by Philippine Airlines prompting the national government to introduce further development. The city government of Dipolog incorporated its growth potential in their development strategy plan.

In 1992, after extending its runway by 500-meter (1,600 ft) and constructing a control tower, Dipolog Airport officially welcomed its first mid-size passenger jet, a Philippine Airlines Boeing 737-300. The same year, daily flights to Dumaguete were introduced by PAL using Short 360 aircraft but were dropped one year later.

In 2002, at least 25% of the passenger traffic bound for Dipolog Airport was composed of foreign tourists.

In July 2006, Cebu Pacific launched non-stop service to Manila using an Airbus A319 with a seating capacity of 150 passengers.

In December 2006, it registered a maximum traffic of 330 daily passengers on several occasions based on the aircraft's available capacity serving the route with Philippine Airlines using the much bigger Boeing 737-400 with a seating capacity of 180 passengers.

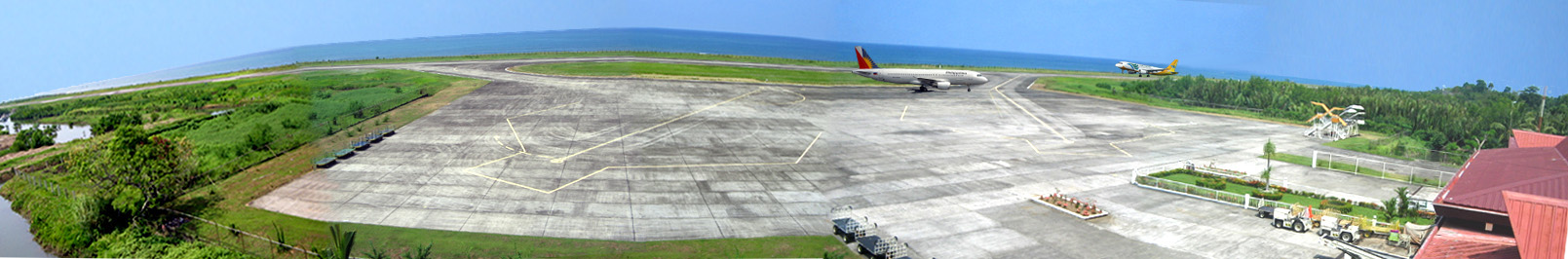
Apron of Dipolog Airport with the airbuses on Philippine Airlines and Cebu Pacific.

The airport was expected to handle more than 150,000 passengers per year by 2009 or an average of 415 daily passengers, which is equivalent to three narrow-body aircraft flights or two flights using one wide-body and one narrow-body aircraft. During the incumbency of former Mayor Evelyn Uy, the City Government built a bridge and an access road to Barangay Barra cutting travel time to and from the City's Business District.

=== Future development ===
In 2018, the Department of Transportation (DOTr), through Secretary Arthur Tugade, planned to upgrade Dipolog Airport, and other local Philippine airports to handle evening flights.

== Airlines and destinations ==
| Airlines | Destinations |
|---|---|
| Cebgo | Cebu |
| Cebu Pacific | Manila |
| PAL Express | Manila |
| Royhle Air Way | Charter: Dumaguete |

== Structure ==
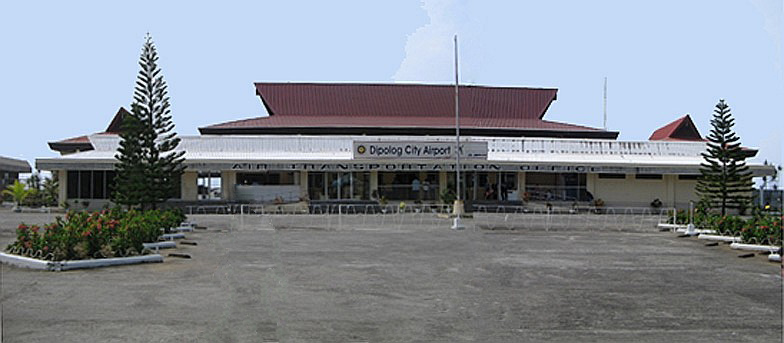
Dipolog Airport Terminal Building in 2007 prior to its renovation.

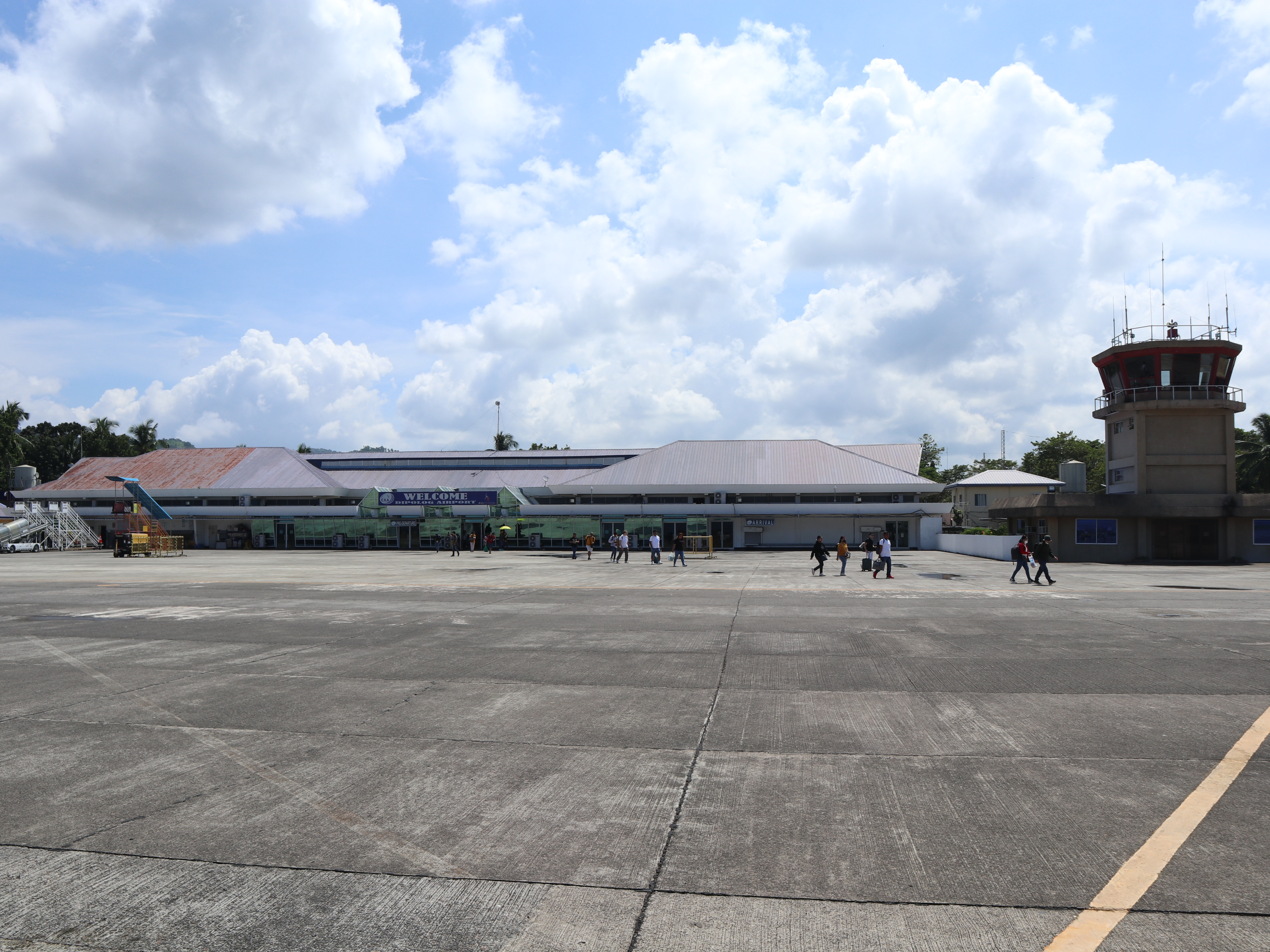
Airport runway and control tower

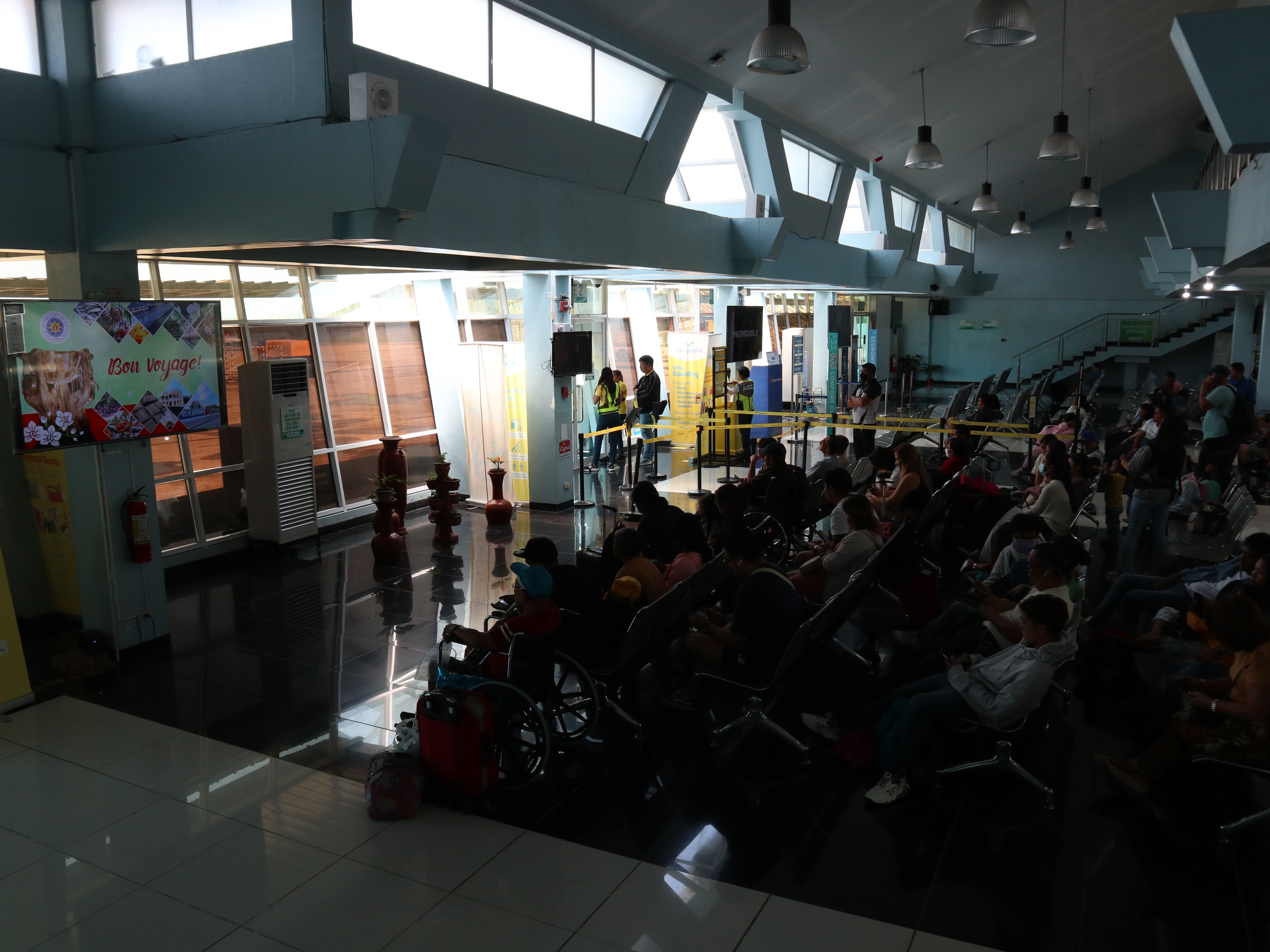
Departure Area

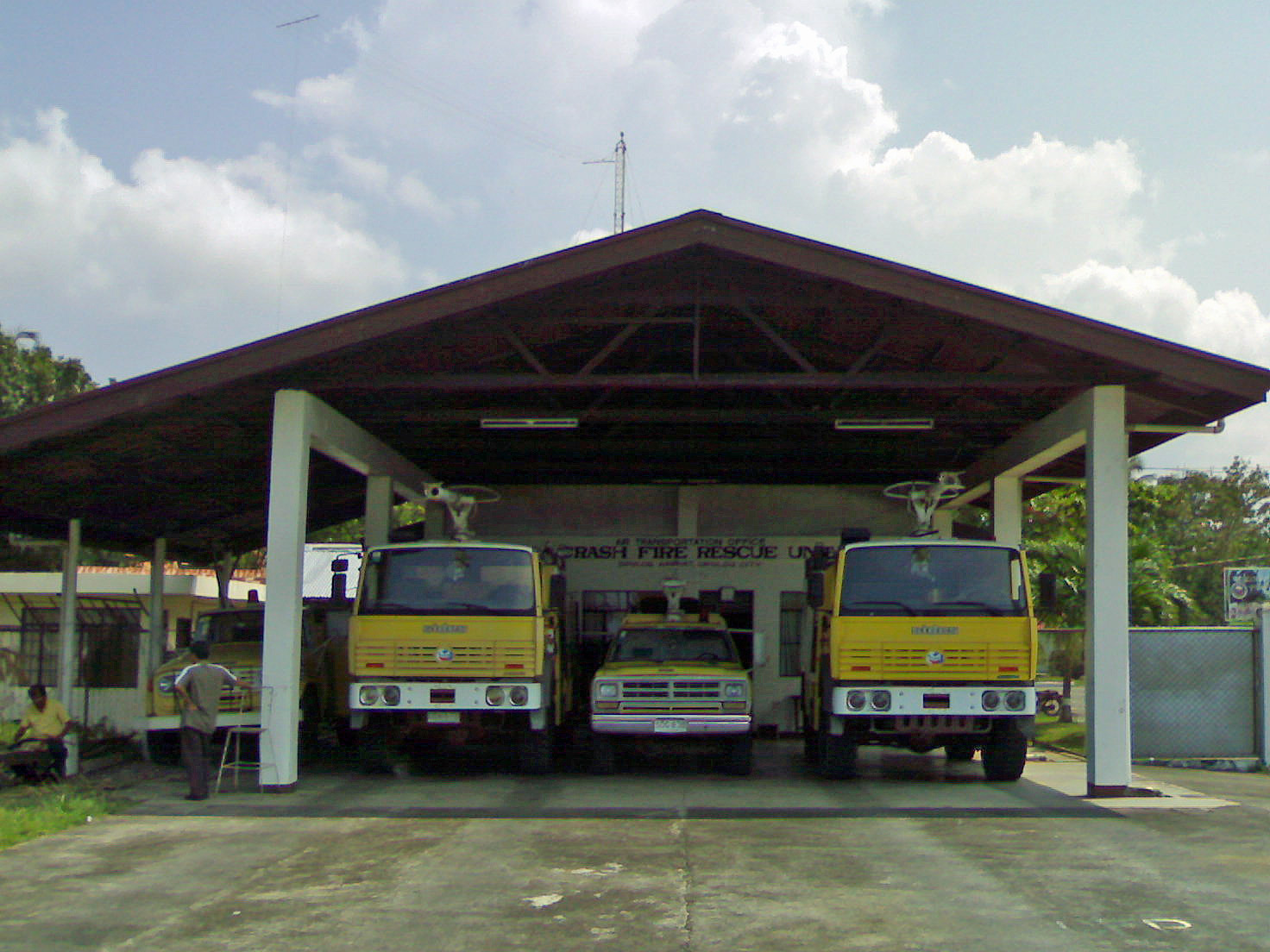
Dipolog Airport Fire Station

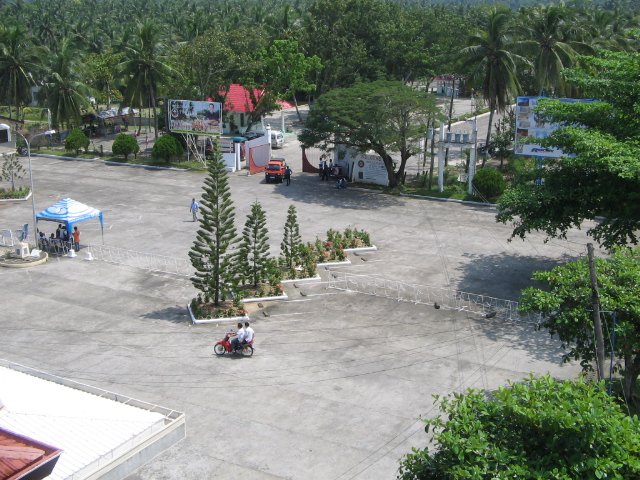
The former parking area, now a security buffer zone. The new parking area is outside the gate near the Miss Universe Garden.

=== Terminal ===
The airport has one terminal and a 150-by-100-meter (490 by 330 ft) apron. The apron is capable of supporting two Airbus A320s and three large general aviation planes simultaneously. There are plans to expand the apron to accommodate bigger aircraft.

The terminal building, which originally had a capacity of 170 passengers, now has a seating capacity of 300 passengers due to new flights offered by Cebu Pacific. The terminal houses a metal detector and an X-ray machine for fast security check-in of passengers and their baggage.

=== Other structures ===
The airport has a modern control tower, a Category V fire station with four firetrucks and a new parking area complex near the Miss Universe Garden.

The new parking area would have a capacity of 100 vehicles when completed by the end of the year. The old parking area, which had a capacity of ninety vehicles, was partially converted into a security buffer zone, to address probable terrorist threats. Forty slots of the old parking area were made part of the new parking area. The city government is expanding again the parking area to accommodate the additional passenger traffic toward the vicinity of the Miss Universe Garden.

There is a mini-garden at the runway side of the terminal that contains a grotto.

The Civil Aviation Authority of the Philippines (CAAP) had put up the Heroes' Lounge for use of members and retirees of the Armed Forces of the Philippines and Philippine National Police, Armed Forces of the Philippines Medal of Valor and Philippine National Police Medal of Valor awardees, together with their families. Dipolog Airport is one of the 24 airports in the Philippines to have a lounge dedicated to uniformed personnel and family members.

== Master plan ==
=== Third Airport Development Project ===
The Dipolog Airport upgrading project was part of the 1997 Third Airport Development Project, a six-airport package that was supposed to be funded by the Asian Development Bank (ADB), the European Investment Bank (EIB), and the Philippine government with its counterpart fund. However, the Philippine government failed to provide on the counterpart fund for the $93 million project. The ADB loan was cancelled effective May 31, 2003.

==== Scope of work ====
Designs for rehabilitation and upgrading were undertaken by COWI-NACO JV, with three local sub-consultants: TransAsia, Basic Team and COWI Philippines. The scope of works included:

1. Runway rehabilitation, extension and widening, and improvements of taxiways and aprons
2. Grading of safety areas adjacent to the runway
3. Construction of proper fencing between airside and landside areas
4. Installation of x-ray equipment
5. Upgrading of terminal and construction of new cargo building and other support facilities to increase service levels to handle forecast traffic for year 2010
6. Installation of runway, approach lights and navigational aids in order to meet the international ICAO safety and security standards
7. Expansion of utility facilities such as water supply and sewage treatment and
8. Improvements of landside parking facilities.

As of April 2007, only items numbers one, two, five, six, and seven were not yet implemented due to huge budgetary requirements.

=== Southern Philippines Airport Development Project ===
DOTC repackaged the project in 2005 into the Southern Philippines Airport Development Project for funding. By 2006, ADB reconsidered Dipolog Airport as one of only three of the six airport projects to be considered for funding based on the request of airline companies operating on the approved facilities, commercial viability, and passenger traffic.

=== ADB Proposed Project Package ===
- Total project cost estimate: 731 million pesos
- Government counterpart: PHP 115 million
  - Repair and completion of shoreline protection structure (seawall) and land reclamation
- Currency rate conversion: 57 PHP per 1 USD
- Date of completion: 2009

==== Components ====
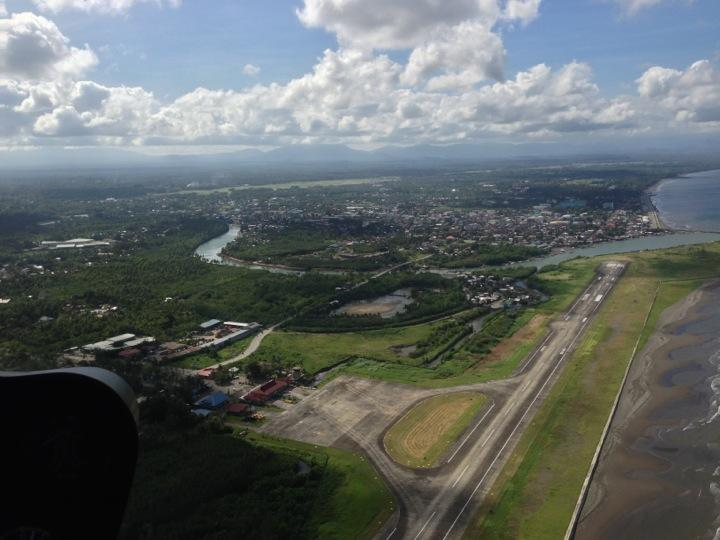
The airport as seen from above

- Runway extension, widening and asphalt overlay of the entire length
  - 2,500 X 45 meters
- expansion of the taxiway, apron and terminal building
  - apron capacity
    - 1 wide-body stand
    - 2 narrow-body aircraft stands
    - 2 general aviation stands
- construction of cargo building
- installation of approach lights ILS and radar equipment
