= Roseller T. Lim =

Filipino politician (1915–1976)

The Honorable Roseller T. Lim
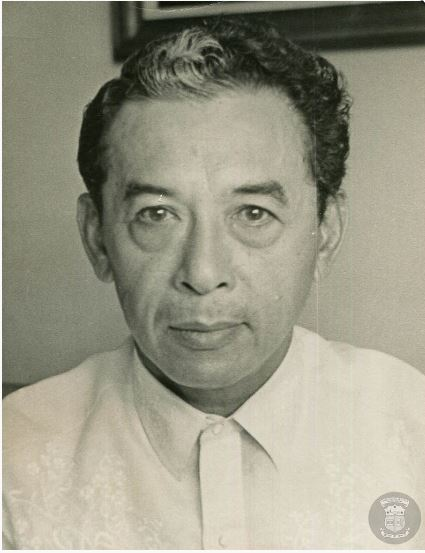

Associate Justice of the Court of Appeals of the Philippines
- In office 1973 – July 5, 1976
- Appointed by: Ferdinand Marcos

Senator of the Philippines
- In office December 30, 1955 – December 30, 1963

Member of the House of Representatives from Zamboanga del Sur's at-large district
- In office December 30, 1953 – December 30, 1955
- Preceded by: District established
- Succeeded by: Canuto M.S. Enerio

Member of the House of Representatives from Zamboanga's at-large district
- In office December 30, 1949 – December 30, 1953
- Preceded by: Juan S. Alano
- Succeeded by: District abolished

Personal details
- Born: February 9, 1915 Zamboanga, Zamboanga Province, Philippine Islands
- Died: July 5, 1976 (aged 61) Makati, Philippines
- Party: Liberal (1965–1976)
- Other political affiliations: Nacionalista (1949–1965)
- Spouse: Amy Schuck
- Children: 5
- Education: Silliman University (AA, LL.B)
- Profession: Lawyer

Roseller Tarroza Lim (February 9, 1915 – July 5, 1976) was a Filipino politician who served as a member of the Senate and House of Representatives from 1949 to 1963. He also served as Court of Appeals Justice from his appointment in 1973 until his death. Lim was known as the "Great Filibuster," after he filibustered for more than 18 hours in an attempt to prevent the election of Ferdinand Marcos as President of the Senate.

== Personal life ==
Roseller Lim was born to Antonio Lim and Mercedes Tarroza. He graduated from the Ateneo de Zamboanga High School as valedictorian in 1932. He earned his Associate in Arts (AA) program in History & law degree from Silliman University in 1940 and passed the bar the same year. He married Amy Mustafa Schuck of Jolo, Sulu and had five children — Rosamy, Mercibel, Victoria, Roseller Jr., and Amy.

== Political career ==
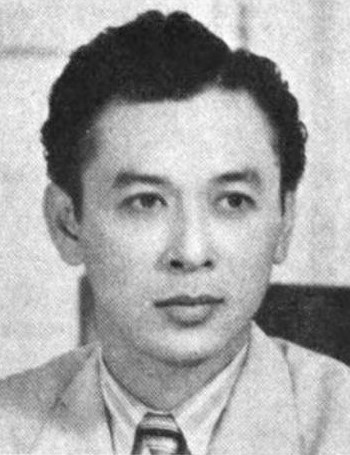
Lim official portrait during the 3rd Congress.

Lim, a Nacionalista, he was first elected as representative of the Lone District of Zamboanga in 1949. In his first term in office, he authored the law that divided the province of Zamboanga into the provinces of Zamboanga del Norte and Zamboanga del Sur. He won another term in 1953, this time as representative of the newly established Lone District of Zamboanga del Sur. Halfway through his term, he ran and won as senator in 1955, to complete the unexpired two years of the Senate term of Carlos P. Garcia, who was elected Vice President in 1953. Lim was instrumental in the election of the Philippines into the International Labour Organization governing body in 1957. He won reelection in 1957 for a full six-year term, but lost in his bid for another term in 1963. Lim also authored the Barrio Charter Law, which served as the basis of the current barangay governments.

=== Great filibuster ===
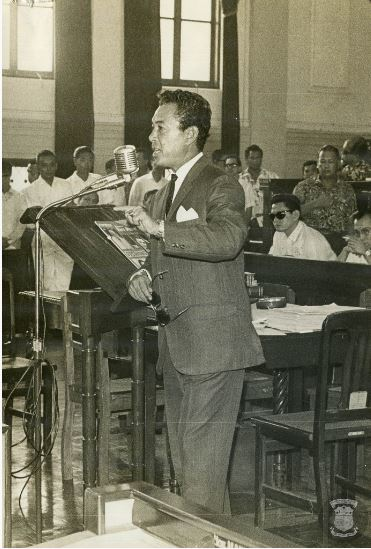
Senator Roseller Lim delivering a speech at the Senate

In April 1963, Liberal Senator Ferdinand Marcos contested the presidency of the Senate against long-time Senate President Eulogio Rodriguez who is a Nacionalista. The Senate was then composed of 12 Liberals, 10 Nacionalistas and two independents who caucus with the latter. Shortly before the Senate adjourned, Lim took the floor to buy time to wait for the arrival from the United States of fellow Nacionalista Senator Alejandro Almendras. Lim had to stand the entire time, leaning only on the podium on occasions. He only had water nearby to sustain him and was even prohibited from going to the comfort room; forcing him to relieve in his pants. Upon learning of Almendras' arrival in the session hall, Lim ended his filibustering after 18 hours and 30 minutes. Immediately after he was able to cast his vote for Rodriguez, Lim was carried out of the session hall on a stretcher due to exhaustion, only to find out later that Almendras voted for Marcos.

=== Later career ===
When Marcos bolted from the Liberals to the Nacionalistas to run as president in the 1965 election, Lim supported President Diosdado Macapagal of the rival Liberal Party. When Marcos won the election, Lim transferred to the Liberals. In 1970, Lim was elected to the 1971 constitutional convention. In 1973, Marcos appointed Lim to the Court of Appeals.

== Legacy ==
Roseller Lim was the first and only politician from Zamboanga to be elected to the Philippine Senate.

On March 16, 1982, President Ferdinand Marcos signed Batas Pambansa No. 183 creating the municipality of Roseller T. Lim in the province of Zamboanga del Sur (now in Zamboanga Sibugay) in honor of Lim. A boulevard in Zamboanga City, which provides a view of Basilan Strait and the Sulu Sea beginning from the city proper to the industrial complex of the city, was named after the latter.

In 2006, the Zamboanga City Council designated February 9 as Día de Roseller T. Lim or Roseller T. Lim Day and a bronze monument was erected at the rotunda of Normal Road and the R. T. Lim Boulevard.
