= Ranollo =

Ranollo is a surname which is predominantly found in the Philippines. Notable people with the name include:

- Esnyr John Ranollo (born 2001), Filipino social media personality, actor, and comedian known mononymously as Esnyr.
- Phylbert Angelli Ranollo Fagestrom (born 1987), Filipino actress, singer and social media personality known professionally as Bea Alonzo.

== See also ==
- Ranillo
