= Zamboanga's at-large congressional district =

Former congressional district of the Philippines

- Former constituency for the Malolos Congress, National Assembly of the Philippines and House of Representatives of the Philippines
- Province: Zamboanga

Former constituency
- Created: 1898 (first creation); 1935 (second creation); 1943 (third creation); 1945 (fourth creation)
- Abolished: 1907 (first abolition); 1943 (second abolition); 1945 (third abolition); 1952 (fourth abolition)

Zamboanga's at-large congressional district may refer to several occasions when a provincewide at-large district was used for elections to the various Philippine national legislatures from the undivided province of Zamboanga.

The Spanish colonial province of Zamboanga was represented in the Malolos Congress following its reorganization in 1898 for the National Assembly of the First Philippine Republic. Three representatives from Luzon were appointed by the assembly to represent the province, namely Felipe Buencamino and Lázaro Tañedo from Tarlac, and Tomás Mascardo from Pampanga. After the fall of the First Republic, the province was abolished with its territory reduced to a district annexed to Moro Province under U.S. civilian rule in 1903. Moro Province was unrepresented in the Philippine Assembly.

Provincial government was re-established in Zamboanga in 1914 but was not entitled to its own representation in the national legislature. Instead, it remained a part of the larger constituency of the Department of Mindanao and Sulu under the Bureau of Non-Christian Tribes whose representatives were appointed by the Governor General beginning in 1916. In 1934, following the passage of the Tydings–McDuffie Act, Zamboanga elected its own delegate for the first time to the 1934 Philippine Constitutional Convention which was charged with the drafting of a new constitution for the Commonwealth of the Philippines. The province then began to send a representative to the Commonwealth National Assembly from its single-member at-large district created under the 1935 constitution.

Zamboanga was also represented in the Second Republic National Assembly during the Pacific War. It also elected a representative to the restored House of Representatives and to the first two congresses of the Third Philippine Republic. It was last represented by Roseller T. Lim. After the 1952 partition of Zamboanga, the district was abolished and replaced by Zamboanga del Norte's and Zamboanga del Sur's at-large districts.

== List of members representing the district ==
=== Malolos Congress (1898–1901) ===
Seat A						Seat B						Seat C						Legislature	Constituent LGUs
Portrait	Member	Term of office		Party	Electoral history	Portrait	Member	Term of office		Party	Electoral history	Portrait	Member	Term of office		Party	Electoral history	Legislature	Constituent LGUs
Portrait	Member	Start	End	Party	Electoral history	Portrait	Member	Start	End	Party	Electoral history	Portrait	Member	Start	End	Party	Electoral history	Legislature	Constituent LGUs
District created June 18, 1898.
	Felipe Buencamino	September 15, 1898	March 23, 1901	Nonpartisan	Appointed by President Emilio Aguinaldo.		Tomás Mascardo	September 15, 1898	March 23, 1901	Nonpartisan	Appointed by President Emilio Aguinaldo.		Lazaro Tañedo	September 15, 1898	March 23, 1901	Nonpartisan	Appointed by President Emilio Aguinaldo.	Malolos Congress	1898–1901 [data missing]
District dissolved into Mindanao and Sulu's at-large district for the House of Representatives.

=== National Assembly (1935–1945) ===
==== Commonwealth ====
Portrait	Member	Term of office		Legislature	Party	Electoral history	Constituent LGUs
Portrait	Member	Start	End	Legislature	Party	Electoral history	Constituent LGUs
District re-created February 8, 1935.
	Juan S. Alano	November 15, 1935	December 30, 1941	1st National Assembly	Nacionalista Democratico	Elected in 1935.	1935–1941 [data missing]
	Juan S. Alano	November 15, 1935	December 30, 1941	2nd National Assembly	Nacionalista	Re-elected in 1938.	1935–1941 [data missing]

==== Second Republic ====
Seat A						Seat B						Legislature	Constituent LGUs
Portrait	Member	Term of office		Party	Electoral history	Portrait	Member	Term of office		Party	Electoral history	Legislature	Constituent LGUs
Portrait	Member	Start	End	Party	Electoral history	Portrait	Member	Start	End	Party	Electoral history	Legislature	Constituent LGUs
District re-created September 7, 1943.
	Juan S. Alano	September 25, 1943	February 2, 1944	KALIBAPI	Elected in 1943.		Agustin L. Alvarez	September 25, 1943	February 2, 1944	KALIBAPI	Appointed as an ex officio member. (Note: As Governor of Zamboanga.)	National Assembly (Second Republic)	1943–1944 [data missing]

=== House of Representatives (1945–1973) ===
Portrait	Member	Term of office		Legislature	Party	Electoral history	Constituent LGUs
Portrait	Member	Start	End	Legislature	Party	Electoral history	Constituent LGUs
District re-created May 24, 1945.
	Matias Ranillo Sr.	June 9, 1945	May 25, 1946	1st Commonwealth Congress	Nacionalista	Elected in 1941.	1945–1953 [data missing]
	Juan S. Alano	May 25, 1946	December 30, 1949	2nd Commonwealth Congress	Liberal	Elected in 1946.	1945–1953 [data missing]
	Juan S. Alano	May 25, 1946	December 30, 1949	1st Congress	Liberal	Elected in 1946.	1945–1953 [data missing]
	Roseller T. Lim	December 30, 1949	December 30, 1953	2nd Congress	Nacionalista	Elected in 1949.	1945–1953 [data missing]
District dissolved into Zamboanga del Norte's and Zamboanga del Sur's at-large districts.

== See also ==
- Legislative districts of Zamboanga del Norte
- Legislative districts of Zamboanga del Sur
