= Zamboanga del Sur's at-large congressional district =

Legislative district of the Philippines

Zamboanga del Sur's at-large congressional district is an obsolete congressional district that encompassed the area of Zamboanga del Sur in the Philippines. It was represented in the House of Representatives from 1953 to 1972 and in the Regular Batasang Pambansa from 1984 to 1986. The province of Zamboanga del Sur was created as a result of the partition of Zamboanga in 1952 and elected its first representative provincewide at-large during the 1953 Philippine House of Representatives elections. Roseller T. Lim, who served as representative of Zamboanga's at-large congressional district during the partition, was this district's first representative. The district remained a single-member district until the dissolution of the lower house in 1972. It was later absorbed by the multi-member Region IX's at-large district for the national parliament in 1978. In 1984, provincial and city representations were restored and Zamboanga del Sur elected three members for the regular parliament with a separate representation created for Zamboanga City. The district was abolished following the 1987 reapportionment to establish three districts under a new constitution.

== Representation history ==
#	Term of office		Congress	Single seat											
#	Start	End	Congress	Image	Member	Party	Electoral history								
=== Zamboanga del Sur"s at-large district for the House of Representatives of the Philippines ===
District created June 6, 1952.
1	December 30, 1953	November 8, 1955	3rd		Roseller T. Lim	Nacionalista	Redistricted from Zamboanga's at-large district and re-elected in 1953. Resigned on election as senator.								
2	December 30, 1957	December 30, 1961	4th		Canuto M. S. Enerio	Nacionalista	Elected in 1957.								
3	December 30, 1961	December 30, 1969	5th		Vincenzo Sagun	Liberal	Elected in 1961.								
3	December 30, 1961	December 30, 1969	6th		Vincenzo Sagun	Liberal	Re-elected in 1965.								
4	December 30, 1969	September 23, 1972	7th		Vicente M. Cerilles	Nacionalista	Elected in 1969. Removed from office after imposition of martial law.								
District dissolved into the eight-seat Region IX's at-large district for the Interim Batasang Pambansa.
#	Term of office		Batasang Pambansa	Seat A				Seat B				Seat C			
#	Start	End	Batasang Pambansa	Image	Member	Party	Electoral history	Image	Member	Party	Electoral history	Image	Member	Party	Electoral history
=== Zamboanga del Sur's at-large district for the Regular Batasang Pambansa ===
District re-created February 1, 1984.
–	July 23, 1984	March 25, 1986	2nd		Vicente M. Cerilles	KBL	Elected in 1984.		Bienvenido A. Ebarle	KBL	Elected in 1984.		Isidoro E. Real Jr.	UNIDO (CCA)	Elected in 1984.
District dissolved into Zamboanga del Sur's 1st, 2nd and 3rd districts.

== See also ==
- Legislative districts of Zamboanga del Norte
