= Jacobo Amatong =

Filipino lawyer and politician

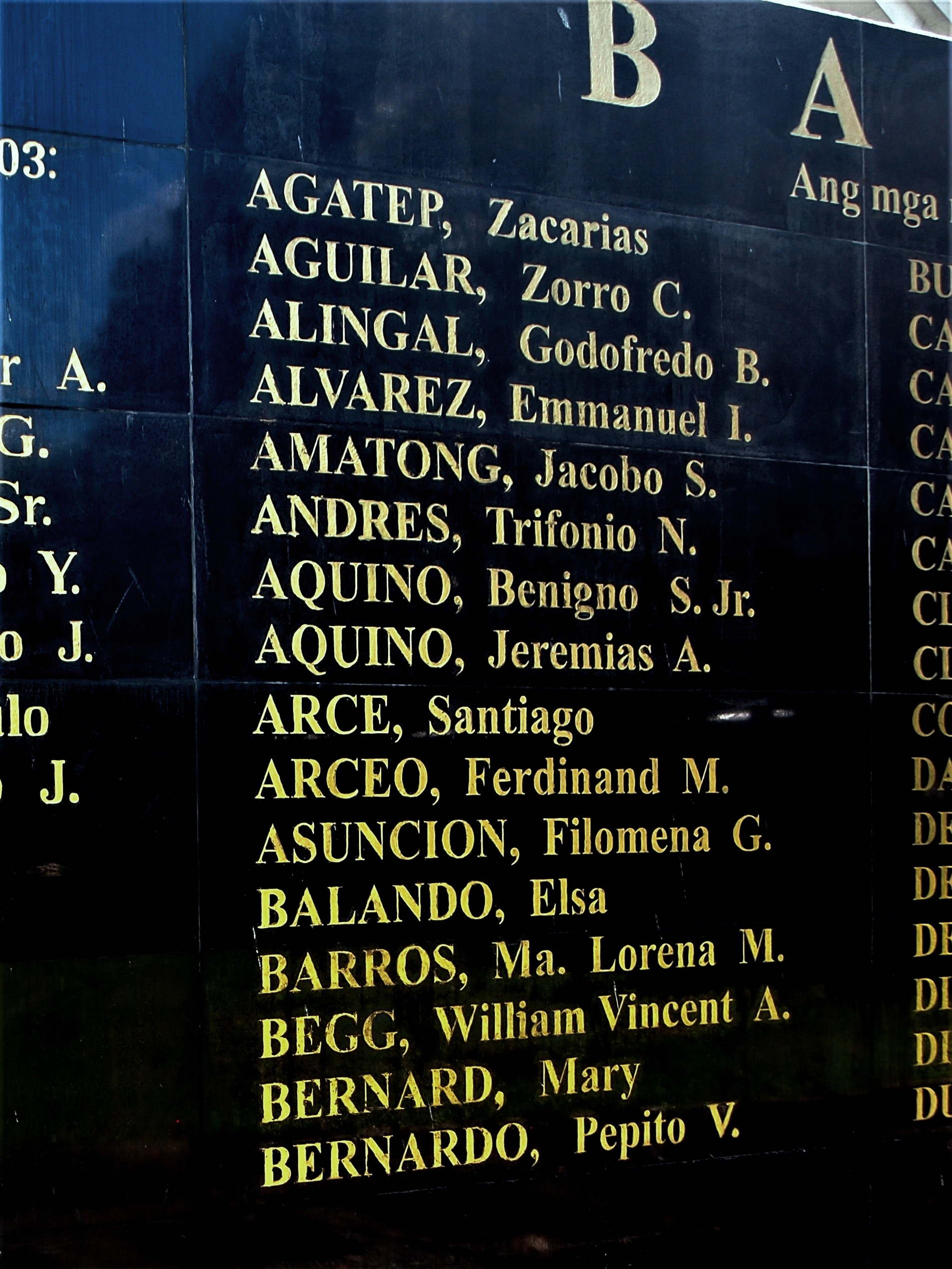
- Detail of the Wall of Remembrance at the Bantayog ng mga Bayani, showing names from the first batch of Bantayog Honorees, including that of Jacobo Amatong.

Member of Dipolog City Council
- In office 1970–1984

Personal details
- Born: Jacobo Sybico Amatong; October 11, 1936 Dipolog, Zamboanga, Philippine Commonwealth
- Died: September 24, 1984 (aged 47) Dipolog, Zamboanga del Norte, Philippines
- Resting place: Dipolog Catholic Cemetery
- Spouse: Helen Cadavedo
- Children: 2
- Parent(s): Amando Borja Amatong; Felicidad Mabanag Sybico
- Relatives: Prospero Amatong (brother); Isagani S. Amatong (brother); Juanita Amatong (sister-in-law)
- Education: Andres Bonifacio College
- Occupation: Lawyer, Newspaper Publisher, Politician

Amatong Street, Miputak, Dipolog
- Interactive map of Amatong Street, Miputak, Dipolog
- Native name: Dalan Amatong (Cebuano)
- Namesake: Jacobo Amatong
- Length: 8 m (26 ft)
- Location: Dipolog
- Postal code: 7100
- Coordinates: 8°35′0.298″N 123°20′17.570″E
- West end: Dipolog Boulevard
- Major junctions: Martinez Street; Magsaysay Street; Arellano Extension
- East end: N79 (Quezon Avenue)

Jacobo Sybico Amatong (October 11, 1936 – September 24, 1984) was a Filipino lawyer, politician, and newspaper publisher from the province of Zamboanga del Norte. He was best known for founding the Mindanao Observer, a community newspaper which became well known for criticizing the martial law administration of Ferdinand Marcos, and for being assassinated by uniformed soldiers on September 24, 1984.

Amatong is honored by having his name etched on the wall of remembrance at the Philippines' Bantayog ng mga Bayani, which honors the heroes and martyrs who fought the authoritarian regime. In 2018, Amatong was also identified by the Human Rights Victims' Claims Board as a Motu Proprio human rights violations victim of the Martial Law Era.

== Life and career ==
Amatong was born on October 11, 1936, in Dipolog, Province of Zamboanga to Amando Borja Amatong and Felicidad Mabanag Sybico who were founders of Andres Bonifacio College, a well-regarded institution in the region.

He was married to Helen Cadavedo, a government accountant, and had two children together.

Amatong was serving as city councilor of Dipolog from 1970. He worked as an activist in many civic and community organizations, most notably as a member of the Western Mindanao Alliance of Sectoral Organizations-Nationalist Alliance for Justice, Freedom and Democracy (NAJFD). Amatong founded the Mindanao Observer which he served as editor and publisher.

== Assassination ==
The night of September 23, 1984, while walking on a street in Barangay Miputak, Amatong and his lawyer friend Zorro Aguilar were shot, leaving Aguilar dead and Amatong rushed to the hospital. He managed to survive for another eight hours before he died in the early morning of the next day, September 24.

== Legacy ==
- A street in Dipolog, from the corner of Quezon Avenue in Barangay Miputak to Dipolog Boulevard is named Amatong Street in his honor. It was later expanded eastward to Katipunan Street.
- On November 30, 1992, in the years after Marcos's removal from power and eventual death in exile, Amatong, alongside Zorro Aguilar and the other 63 martial law victims, were honored and enshrined in the Wall of Remembrance in the Bantayog ng mga Bayani in Quezon City, making up the first batch of martial law martyrs and heroes who were given honor for their respective contributions during the martial rule.
