= Zorro Aguilar =

Filipino lawyer and activist (1942–1984)

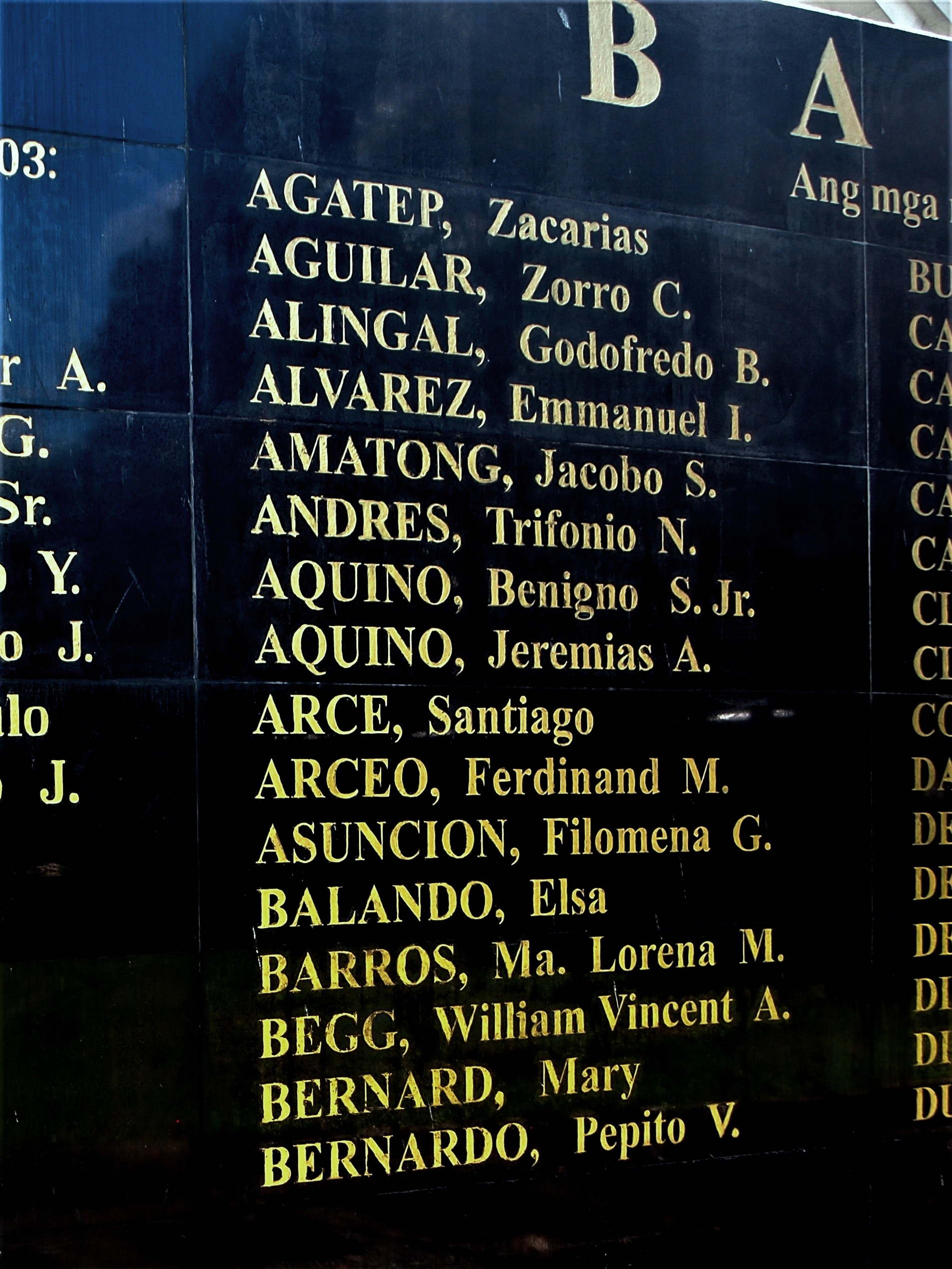
- Detail of the Wall of Remembrance at the Bantayog ng mga Bayani, showing names from the first batch of Bantayog Honorees, including that of Zorro Aguilar.
- Born: Zorro Campos Aguilar; August 7, 1942; Dipolog, Province of Zamboanga
- Died: September 23, 1984 (aged 42); Dipolog, Zamboanga del Norte
- Cause of death: Assassination
- Education: Andres Bonifacio College
- Spouse: Virginia Legados
- Parent(s): Esteban Aguilar; Emiliana Campos

Aguilar Street, Miputak, Dipolog
- Interactive map of Aguilar Street, Miputak, Dipolog
- Native name: Dalan Aguilar (Cebuano)
- Namesake: Zorro Aguilar
- Length: 8 m (26 ft)
- Location: Dipolog
- Postal code: 7100
- Coordinates: 8.581103°N 123.337592°E
- West end: Magsaysay Street
- Major junctions: Arellano Extension
- East end: N79 (Quezon Avenue)

Zorro Campos Aguilar (August 7, 1942 - September 23, 1984) was a Dipolog-based Filipino human rights lawyer, activist, and newspaper editor best known for his work with the Free Legal Assistance Group, and the Zamboanga del Norte chapter of the Coalition for Restoration of Democracy (CORD).

He was investigating the July 1984 killing of a human rights researcher in Zamboanga del Norte when he was himself gunned down on September 23, 1984. Aguilar was killed instantly, but fellow lawyer and politician Jacobo Amatong, who was with Aguilar when they were attacked, survived another eight hours and managed to tag their attackers as soldiers of the Marcos government before dying in the hospital.

Two soldiers were eventually identified by the National Bureau of Investigation as suspects in the killing of Aguilar and Amatong, but the case faded away when the key witness was killed a year later.

== Education ==
Aguilar completed his law degree, and graduated from Andres Bonifacio College. He successfully passed the Philippine Bar examination of 1975, and was admitted to the bar afterwards.

== Legacy ==
- In the years after Marcos's removal from power and eventual passing in exile, Aguilar was honored in 1992 by having his name inscribed on the wall of remembrance at the Philippines' Bantayog ng mga Bayani, which honors the heroes and martyrs who fought against Ferdinand Marcos and his martial law regime.
- In his hometown of Dipolog, a street in Barangay Miputak from the corner of Quezon Avenue to Magsaysay Street was named Aguilar Street in his honor.
