= Matias Ranillo Sr. =

Filipino politician

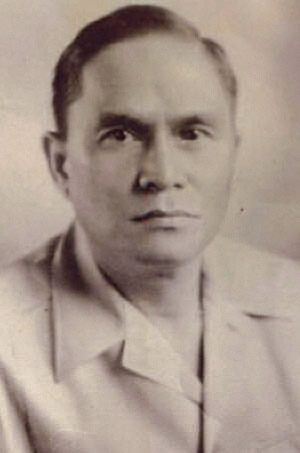
- Hon. Ranillo, c. 1946

Member of the Philippine House of Representatives from Zamboanga's Lone District
- In office June 9, 1945 – May 25, 1946
- Preceded by: Juan S. Alano
- Succeeded by: Juan S. Alano

Governor of Zamboanga
- In office 1937–1940
- Preceded by: Felipe Ramos
- Succeeded by: Felipe Azcuna

Personal details
- Born: Matias Castillon Ranillo Sr. February 28, 1898 Dipolog, Zamboanga Peninsula, Captaincy General of the Philippines
- Died: December 18, 1947 (aged 49) Zamboanga City, Zamboanga, Philippines
- Spouse: Sotera Colana Kaper
- Relations: Mat Ranillo III (grandson); Suzette Ranillo (granddaughter); Krista Ranillo (great-granddaughter)
- Children: Virginia Ranillo-Papa, Consuelo Ranillo-Gatchalian, Matias Ranillo Jr., Miguelito Ranillo, Gloria Ranillo-Armada
- Parent(s): Primo Ranillo and Laureana Castillon

Matias Castillon Ranillo Sr. (February 28, 1898 – December 18, 1947) was a Governor of then Province of Zamboanga and later Congressman of the lone Legislative District of Zamboanga during the 1st Congress of the Commonwealth of the Philippines. During the Japanese occupation in World War II, he was made Military Governor of the province.

== Early life and career ==
Ranillo was born February 28, 1898, to Primo Ranillo and Laureana Castillon in Dipolog, Zamboanga Peninsula. Handsome and bright, he was the only candidate from the Manila Law College to pass the Philippine Bar Examinations in 1926. A very articulate lawyer, he then became a judge in Basilan.

== Political career ==
Ranillo was elected Governor of the Province of Zamboanga in 1937. In 1939, he was present when President Manuel L. Quezon and his daughters Zenaida and Aurora "Baby" inaugurated the first bridge linking Dipolog and Dapitan, now called the Quezon Bridge. He also welcomed Vice President Sergio Osmeña when the latter inaugurated Dipolog Airport in October 1941, who came in on board a Philippine Army Air Corps flight and almost crashed at landing. They immediately proceeded to Dipolog Cathedral to have a Thanksgiving Mass for landing safely.

== Japanese occupation ==
Already an elected assemblyman at the outbreak of World War II in Manila on December 7, 1941, he was captured by the Japanese and later recaptured and imprisoned by the American forces in June 1942. He was subsequently released in December 1942 and was appointed civilian governor of the Province of Zamboanga under the auspices of the US Tenth Military District. During this time, he ensured that the people Zamboanga did not starve as much by conducting a food production campaign and coordinating with other Filipino guerilla-controlled areas to allow necessary supplies to flow to the peninsula. His efforts also provided American and Filipino troops refuge and staging area for the liberation of the peninsula from the Japanese occupation.

== Family ==
Matias Ranillo married Sotera Colana Kaper and had 5 children named Virginia Ranillo (married Commodore Jack Papa), Consuelo Ranillo (married Atty. Gil Gatchalian), Matias ‘Mat’ Ranillo Jr. (married actress Gloria Sevilla), Miguel Ranillo (married Dr. Heidi Zapanta), and Gloria Ranillo (married Dr. Raoul Vicente Armada). He has 20 grandchildren and 37 great-grandchildren.

== Death ==
Due to his imprisonment and continued work in harsh mountainous environments as civilian governor, Ranillo's health deteriorated rapidly. To avoid capture, he had to move his government seat month after month through mountains and rivers, often on wet clothes. Nevertheless, he continued on with his food production campaign and finally, his ill health led to his untimely death on December 18, 1947, at the age of 49 at Brent Hospital in Zamboanga City. His remains were brought back to his hometown Dipolog for burial.

== Legacy ==
- A street in Dipolog, originally named Lincoln Street, from the corner of Quezon Avenue in Barangay Central (facing the entrance gate of the Dipolog Central Public Market) to Dipolog Boulevard is named Ranillo Street.
- In 2012, a movement was started, spearheaded by Ranillo's daughter, Virginia Ranillo-Papa, to propose the renaming of the Dipolog Airport to Matias Castillon Ranillo Airport, to recognize his efforts and sacrifices for his hometown and the peninsula. Though unsuccessfully fulfilled, he was then given a place inside Dipolog Airport with the Governor Matias C. Ranillo Commemorative Wall situated at the departure area, unveiled in 2018.
- In 2017, Lawigan National High School in Labason, Zamboanga del Norte was renamed as Matias C. Ranillo National High School in his honor. Matias donated the land where the high school is situated.

== Gallery ==
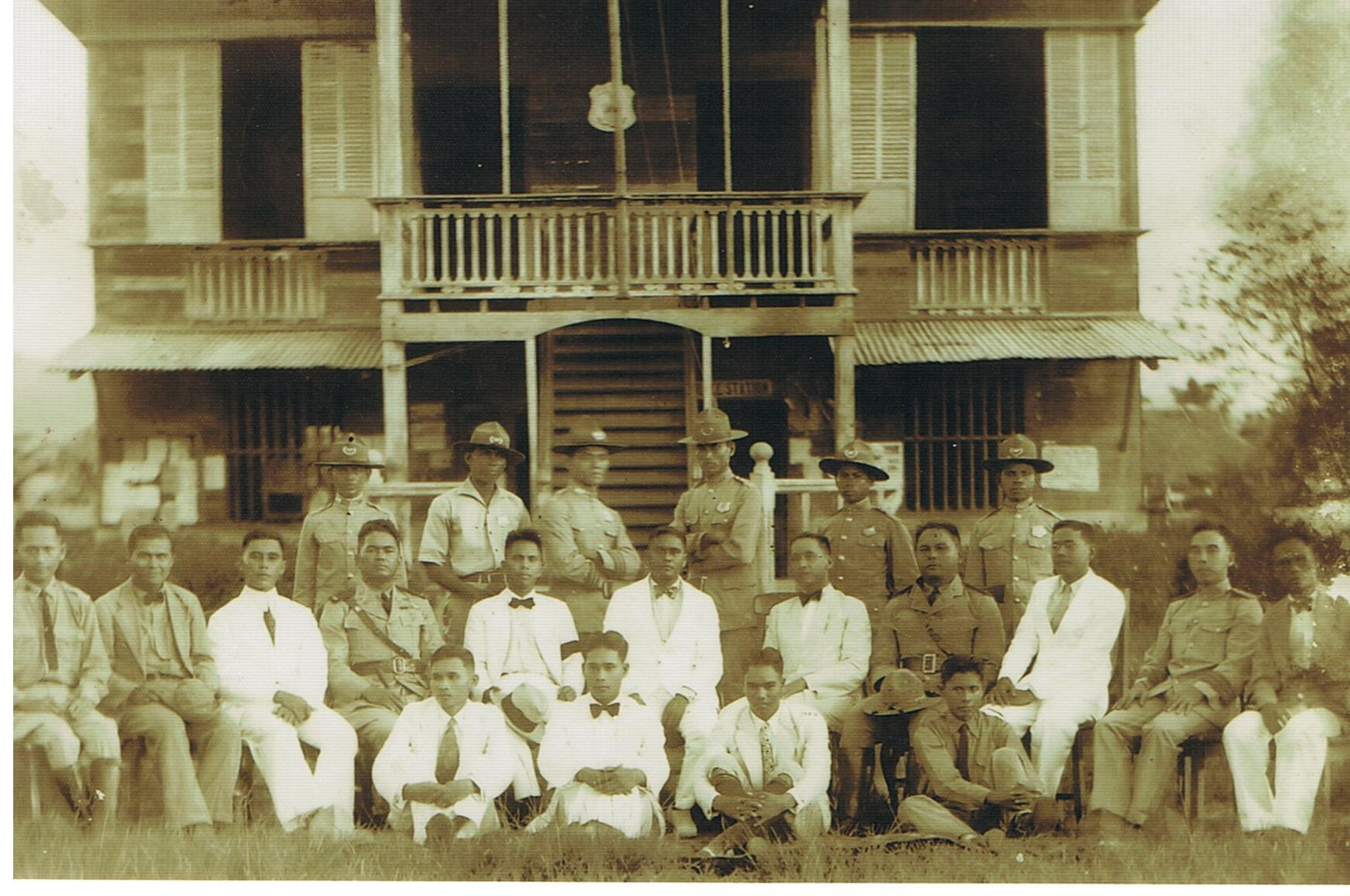
Ranillo as Deputy Governor 1932–1934, taken at Sindangan, Zamboanga peninsula. Ranillo is at center, Bartolome Lira (who became the first Municipal President of Sindangan in 1936) 3rd from right.

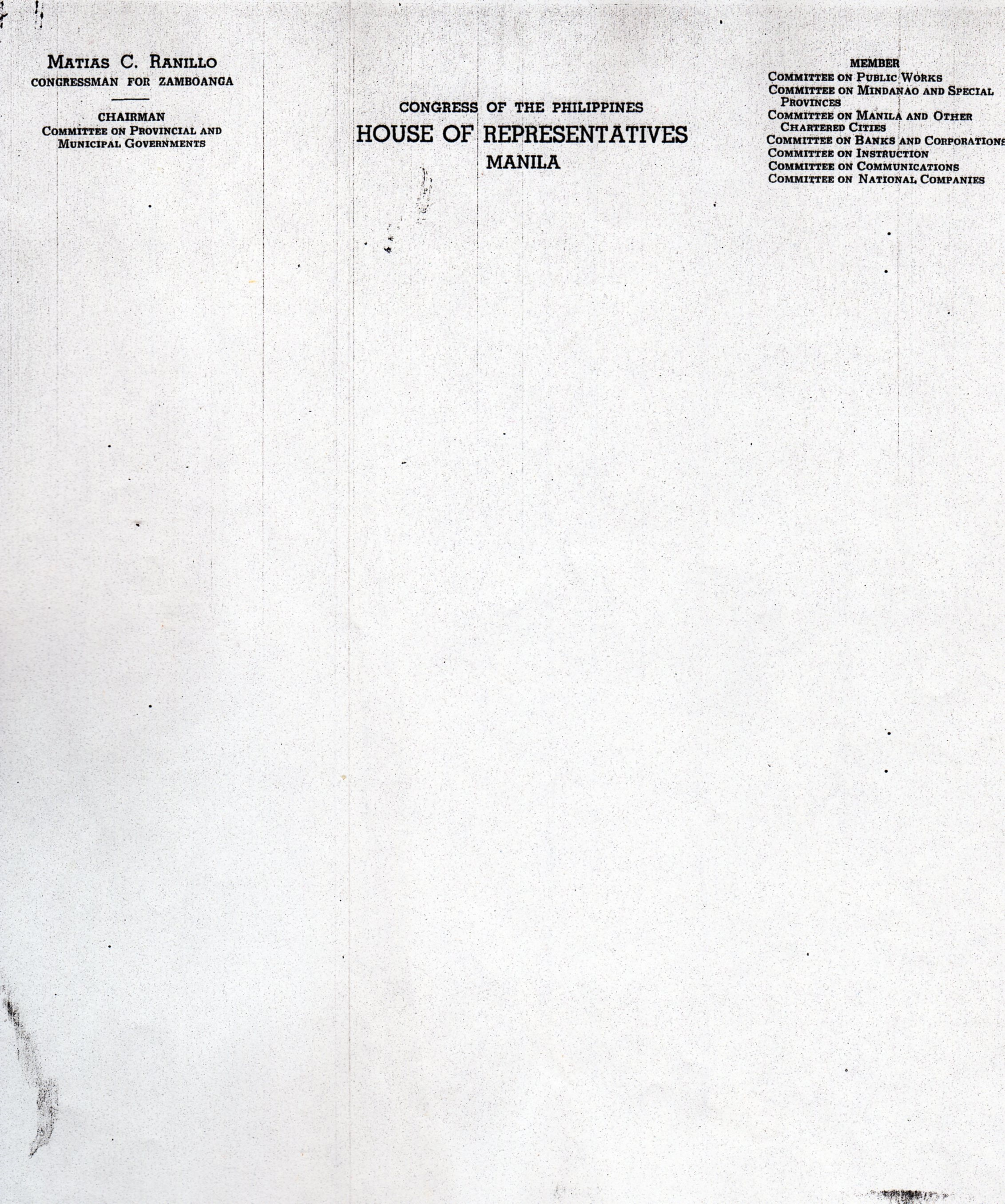
Office Stationery as Representative of Zamboanga

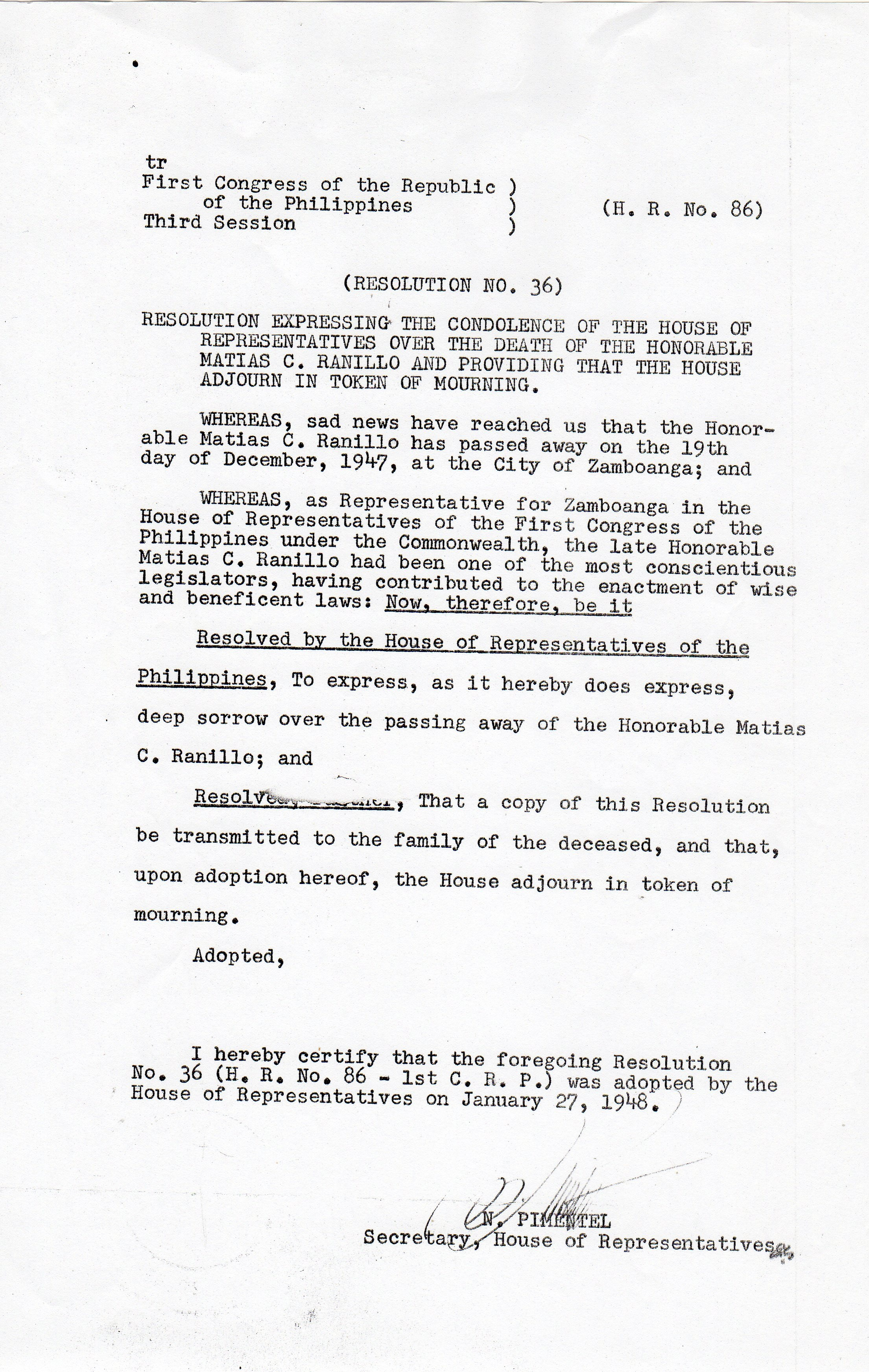
First Congress of the Philippines Resolution upon Ranillo's death on December 18, 1947
