= Zamboanga del Norte =

- Province
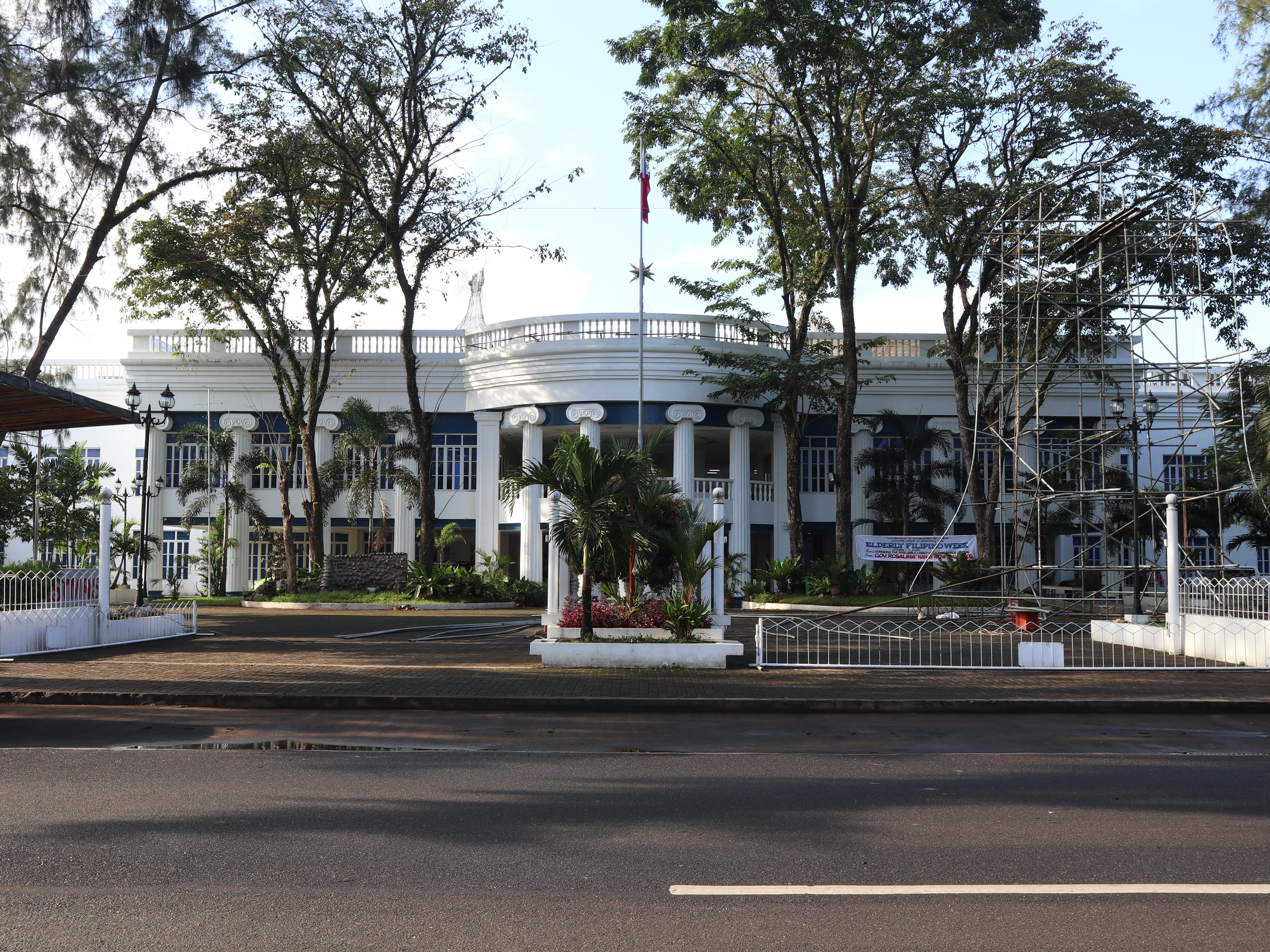
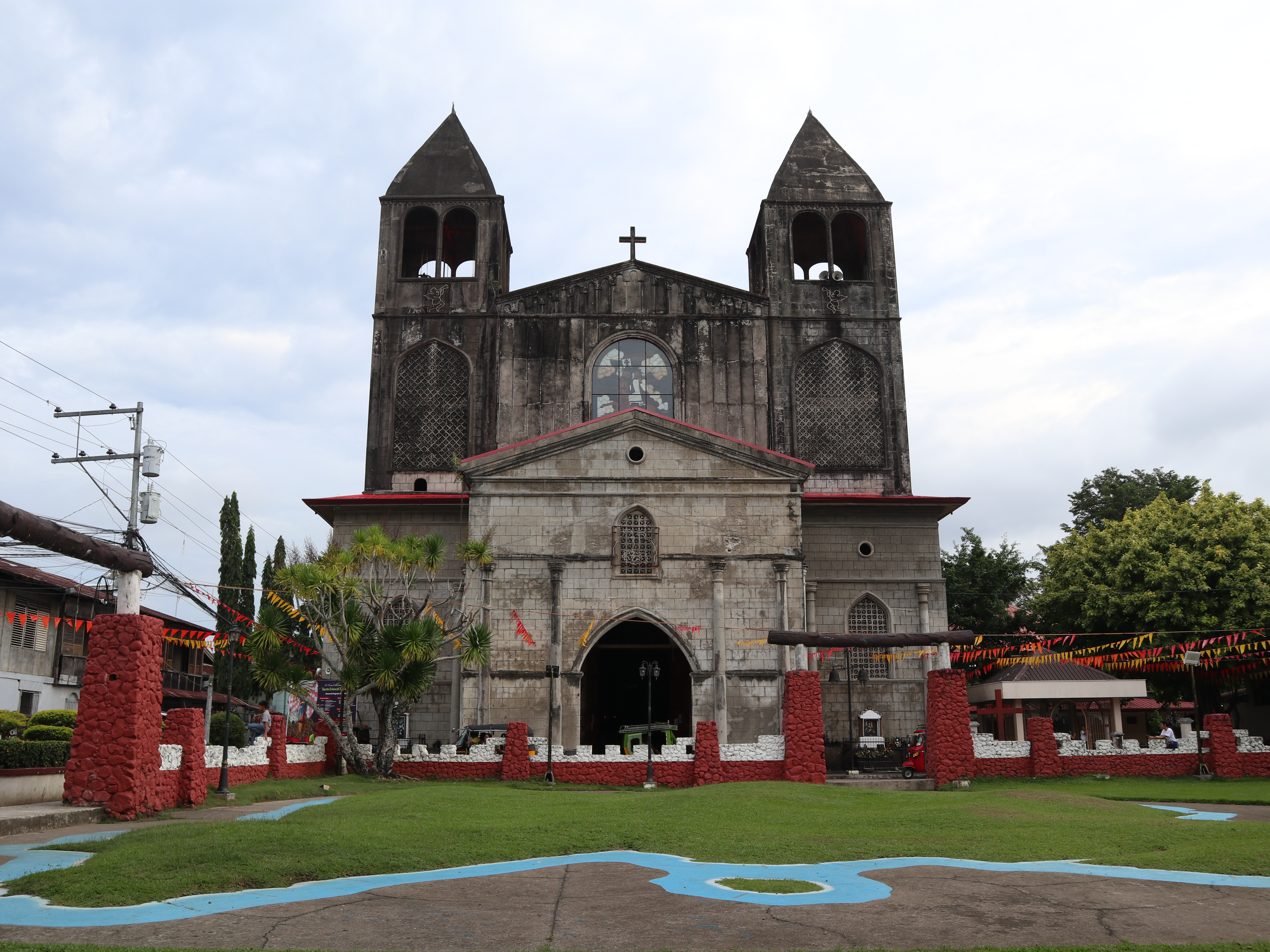
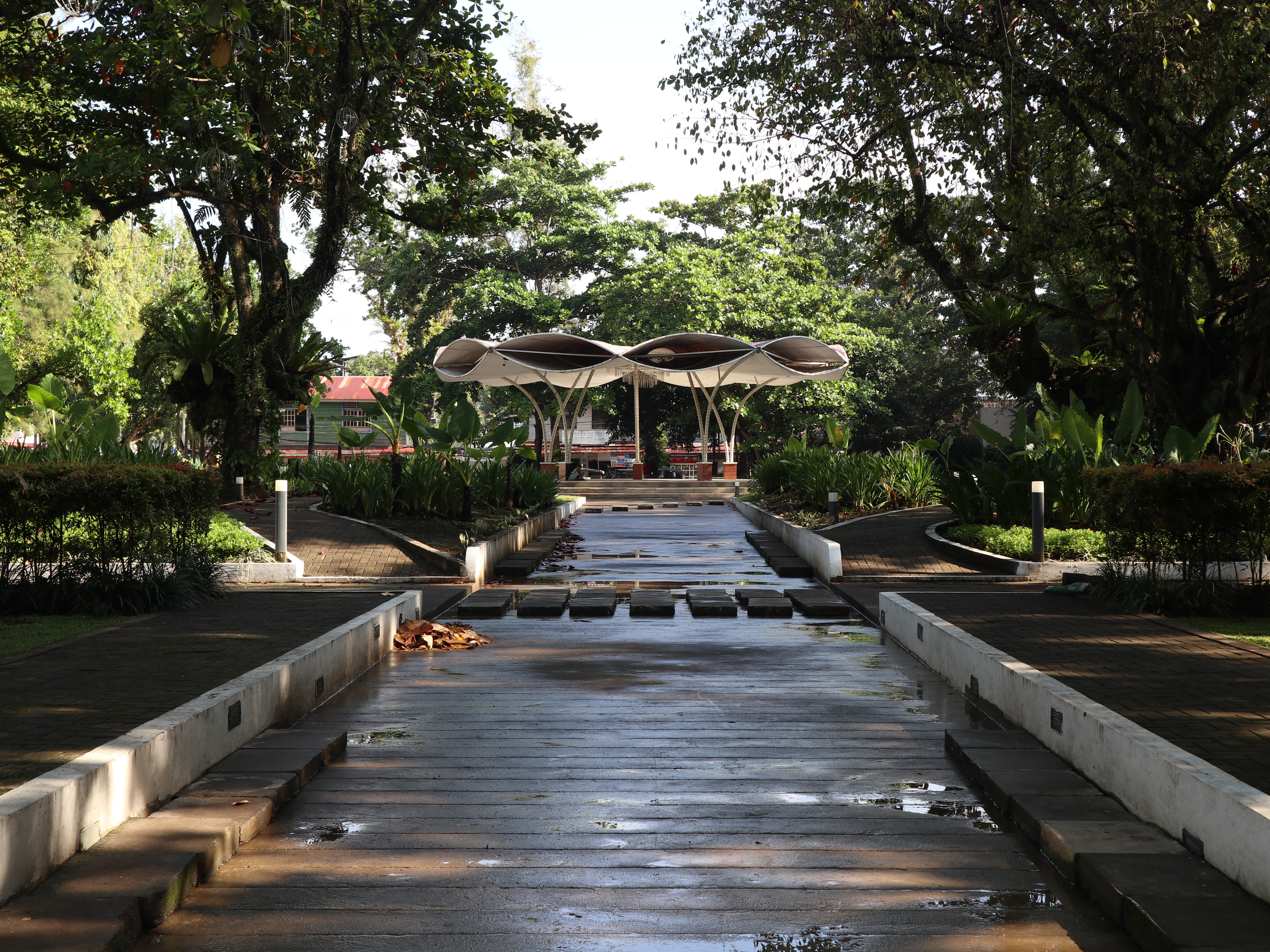
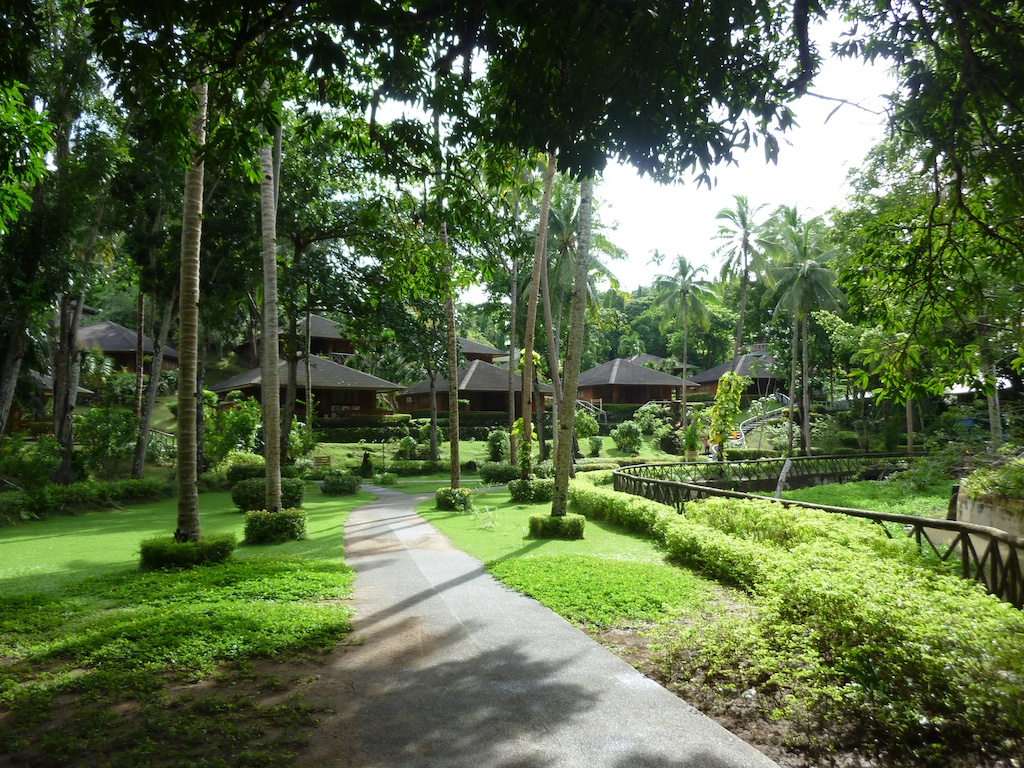
- (from top: left to right) Provincial Capitol Building in Dipolog, Saint James the Greater Church, Magsaysay Park, and Dakak Beach Resort

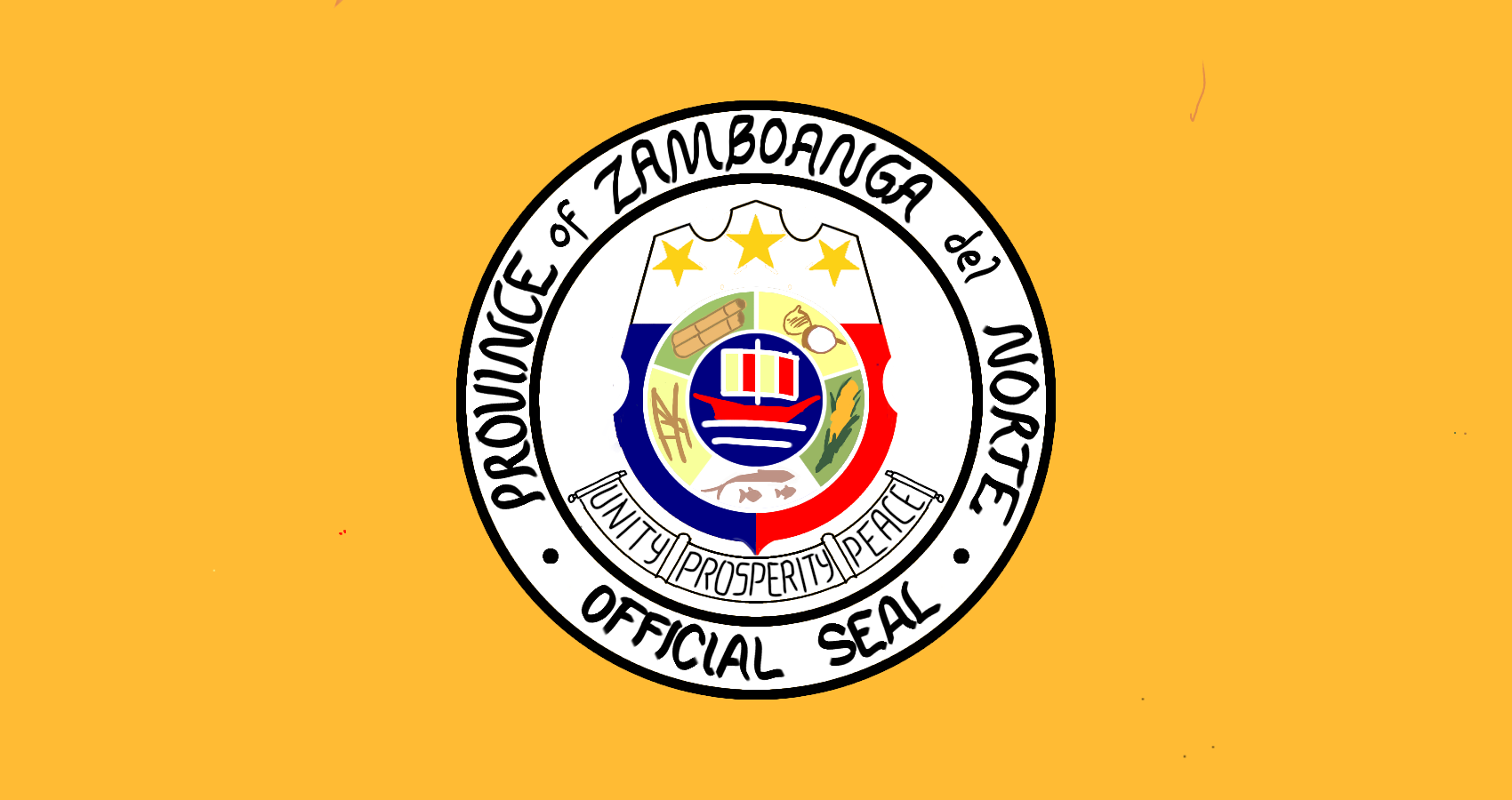
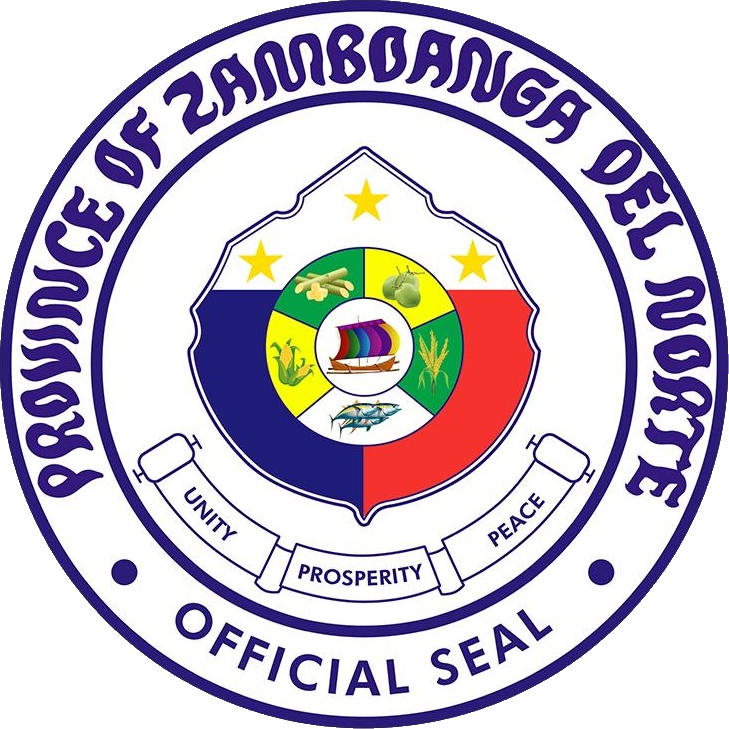
- Flag Seal
- Motto: Unity, Prosperity, Peace
- Location in the Philippines
- Interactive map of Zamboanga del Norte
- Coordinates: 8°08′00″N 123°00′00″E
- Country: Philippines
- Region: Zamboanga Peninsula
- Founded: June 6, 1952
- Capital and largest city: Dipolog

Government
  - Type: Sangguniang Panlalawigan
  - Governor: Darel Dexter T. Uy (Lakas)
  - Vice Governor: Julius C. Napigquit (Lakas)
  - Legislature: Zamboanga del Norte Provincial Board
  - Electorate: 780,540 voters (2025)

Area
  - Total: 7,301.00 km^{2} (2,818.93 sq mi)
  - Rank: 9th out of 82
- Highest elevation (Mount Dansalan): 629 m (2,064 ft)

Population (2024 census)
  - Total: 1,067,067
  - Rank: 27th out of 82
  - Density: 146.154/km^{2} (378.536/sq mi)
  - Rank: 60th out of 82
  - Households: 247,971
- Demonym(s): North Zamboangueño; North Samboanganon

Divisions
  - Independent cities: 0
  - Component cities: 2: Dapitan; Dipolog
  - Municipalities: 25: Baliguian; Godod; Gutalac; Jose Dalman; Kalawit; Katipunan; La Libertad; Labason; Leon B. Postigo; Liloy; Manukan; Mutia; Piñan; Polanco; President Manuel A. Roxas; Rizal; Salug; Sergio Osmeña Sr.; Siayan; Sibuco; Sibutad; Sindangan; Siocon; Sirawai; Tampilisan
  - Barangays: 691
  - Districts: Legislative districts of Zamboanga del Norte

Economy
  - Income class: 1st provincial income class
  - Poverty incidence: 37.7% (2023)
  - Revenue: ₱ 3,261 million (2024)
  - Assets: ₱ 10,023 million (2024)
  - Expenditure: ₱ 1,528 million (2024)
  - Liabilities: ₱ 2,428 million (2024)
- Time zone: UTC+8 (PHT)
- PSGC: 097200000
- IDD : area code: +63 (0)65
- ISO 3166 code: PH-ZAN
- Spoken languages: Cebuano; Subanon Filipino; English
- Website: www.zanorte.gov.ph

Zamboanga del Norte (Cebuano: Amihanang Zamboanga; Subanon: Utara Sembwangan; Filipino: Hilagang Zamboanga), officially the Province of Zamboanga del Norte, is a province in the Philippines situated within the Zamboanga Peninsula region in Mindanao. Its capital and largest city is Dipolog and the province borders Zamboanga del Sur and Zamboanga Sibugay to the south, Misamis Occidental to the east, and the Sulu Sea to the west.

Zamboanga del Norte is the largest province of the Zamboanga Peninsula region by land area covering 7,301.00 square kilometres (2,818.93 sq mi). Zamboanga del Norte is the 26th populous province in the Philippines.

== Etymology ==
The name of Zamboanga is the Hispanicized spelling of the Sinama term for "mooring place" - samboangan (also spelled sambuangan; and in Subanen, sembwangan), from the root word samboang ("mooring pole"). "Samboangan" was the original name of Zamboanga City, from where the name of the peninsula is derived from. "Samboangan" is well-attested in Spanish, British, French, German, and American historical records from as far back as the 17th century.

This is commonly contested by folk etymologies which instead attribute the name of Zamboanga to the Indonesian word jambangan (claimed to mean "place of flowers", but actually means "pot" or "bowl"), usually with claims that all ethnic groups in Zamboanga were "Malays". However, this name has never been attested in any historical records prior to the 1960s.

== History ==
=== American colonial era ===
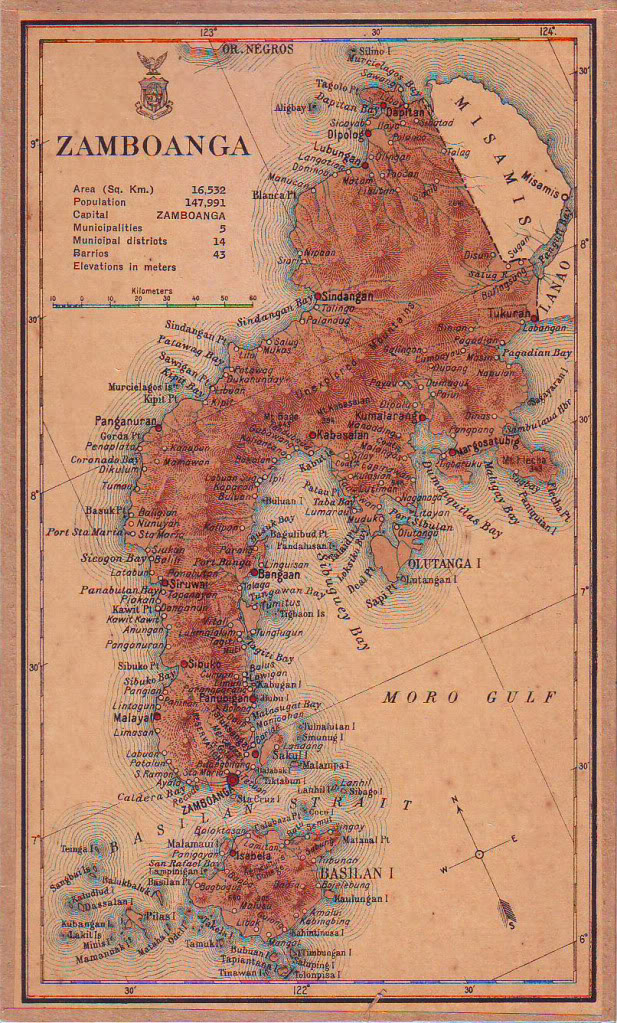
The historical province of Zamboanga in 1918

Prior to its creation as a province, Zamboanga del Norte formed the northern portion of the historical province of Zamboanga.

The early history of Zamboanga del Norte is shared with that of Zamboanga City, which had been the center of the entire Mindanao area, most notably during the American era. When Zamboanga City became a chartered city on October 12, 1936, it encompassed the southern tip of the Zamboanga Peninsula and the island of Basilan, making it the largest city in the world in terms of land area.

=== Philippine independence ===
==== Foundation ====
Through Republic Act No. 711 issued on June 6, 1952, Zamboanga province was divided into two independent provinces, which included Zamboanga del Sur.

==== Martial law era ====
The late 1960s in Mindanao saw a rise in land dispute conflicts arising from the influx of settlers from Luzon and Visayas, and from the Marcos administration's encouragement of militia groups such as the Ilaga. News of the 1968 Jabidah massacre ignited a furor in the Moro community, and ethnic tensions encouraged with the formation of secessionist movements, starting from the largely political Muslim Independence Movement and Bangsamoro Liberation Organization, and eventually the Moro National Liberation Front (MNLF), and the Moro Islamic Liberation Front (MILF). Additionally, an economic crisis in late 1969, violent crackdowns on student protests in 1970, and 1971, and eventually the declaration of Martial Law all led to the radicalization of many students. Many of them left schools in Manila and joined the New People's Army "underground" in various provinces away from the capital, bringing the New People's Army rebellion to Mindanao for the first time.

The September 1972 declaration of Martial Law began a 14-year period historically remembered for its human rights abuses, often involving the warrantless detention, murder, and physical, sexual, or mental torture of political opponents, student activists, journalists, religious workers, farmers, and others who fought against the Marcos dictatorship. Zamboanga del Norte was the site of at least one major assassination during the Marcos Martial law era - the gunning down of Human Rights lawyers Jacobo Amatong and Zorro Aguilar by two soldiers of the Marcos government, who were never caught. In the underground, a prominent figure who was killed was underground acupuncturist and paramedic Leo Alto, who spent much of his time helping the Subanon communities in Zamboanga del Norte to fight for their ancestral lands. Alto and a Subanon companion were killed by the Philippine Constabulary in Polanco, Zamboanga del Norte on August 1, 1975.

Alto, and lawyers Amatong and Aguilar have since been honored by having their names inscribed on the wall of remembrance at the Philippines' Bantayog ng mga Bayani, which honors the heroes and martyrs who fought against Ferdinand Marcos and his martial law regime.

=== Contemporary ===
==== Proposed carving out of new province ====
In 2017, House Bill No. 5040 was introduced in the House of Representatives seeking to carve out a new province from Zamboanga del Norte. The proposed Zamboanga Hermosa province was to consist of 12 municipalities and 2 legislative districts that make up the 3rd legislative district of Zamboanga del Norte: Baliguian, Godod, Gutalac, Kalawit, Labason, Leon B. Postigo, Liloy (its proposed capital), Salug, Sibuco, Siocon, Sirawai, and Tampilisan. However, the bill ultimately did not pass the 17th congress.

In 2023, a new House Bill 9311 proposed a creation of a new province, Zamboanga Occidental. The proposed province is supposed to include 12 municipalities: Leon B. Postigo, Salug, Godod, Liloy, Tampilisan, Kalawit, Labason, Gutalac, Baliguian, Siocon, Sirawai, and Sibuco.

== Geography ==
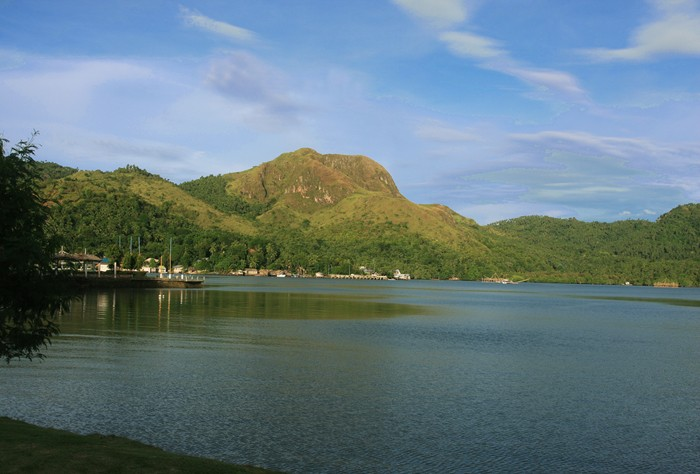
Dakak riverside in Dapitan

Zamboanga del Norte covers a total area of 7,301.00 square kilometres (2,818.93 sq mi) occupying the northern portion of the Zamboanga Peninsula in western Mindanao. The province is bordered on the north and west by the Sulu Sea, on the northeast by Misamis Occidental, and on the south by Zamboanga del Sur and Zamboanga Sibugay.

It has an average elevation of 243.8 metres (800 ft), with Mount Dabiak in Katipunan as the highest peak at 2,600 metres (8,500 ft). Other parts, near the coastlines, are plains. The province's irregular coastline runs some 400 kilometres (250 mi) from north to south.

=== Climate ===
Zamboanga del Norte has a mild and moderate climate due to evenly distributed rainfall throughout the year. Its southern portion has a longer dry season.

Climate data for Zamboanga del Norte
| Month | Jan | Feb | Mar | Apr | May | Jun | Jul | Aug | Sep | Oct | Nov | Dec | Year |
|---|---|---|---|---|---|---|---|---|---|---|---|---|---|
| Mean daily maximum °C (°F) | 30.4 (86.7) | 30.5 (86.9) | 31.6 (88.9) | 32.6 (90.7) | 32.3 (90.1) | 31.7 (89.1) | 31.6 (88.9) | 31.6 (88.9) | 31.8 (89.2) | 31.5 (88.7) | 31.4 (88.5) | 30.8 (87.4) | 31.5 (88.7) |
| Mean daily minimum °C (°F) | 21.8 (71.2) | 21.9 (71.4) | 20.8 (69.4) | 22.2 (72.0) | 21.2 (70.2) | 21.0 (69.8) | 21.1 (70.0) | 21.0 (69.8) | 21.1 (70.0) | 21.3 (70.3) | 21.4 (70.5) | 21.3 (70.3) | 21.3 (70.4) |
| Average rainy days | 15 | 10 | 8 | 7 | 10 | 17 | 16 | 16 | 14 | 16 | 17 | 16 | 162 |
Source: Storm247

=== Administrative divisions ===
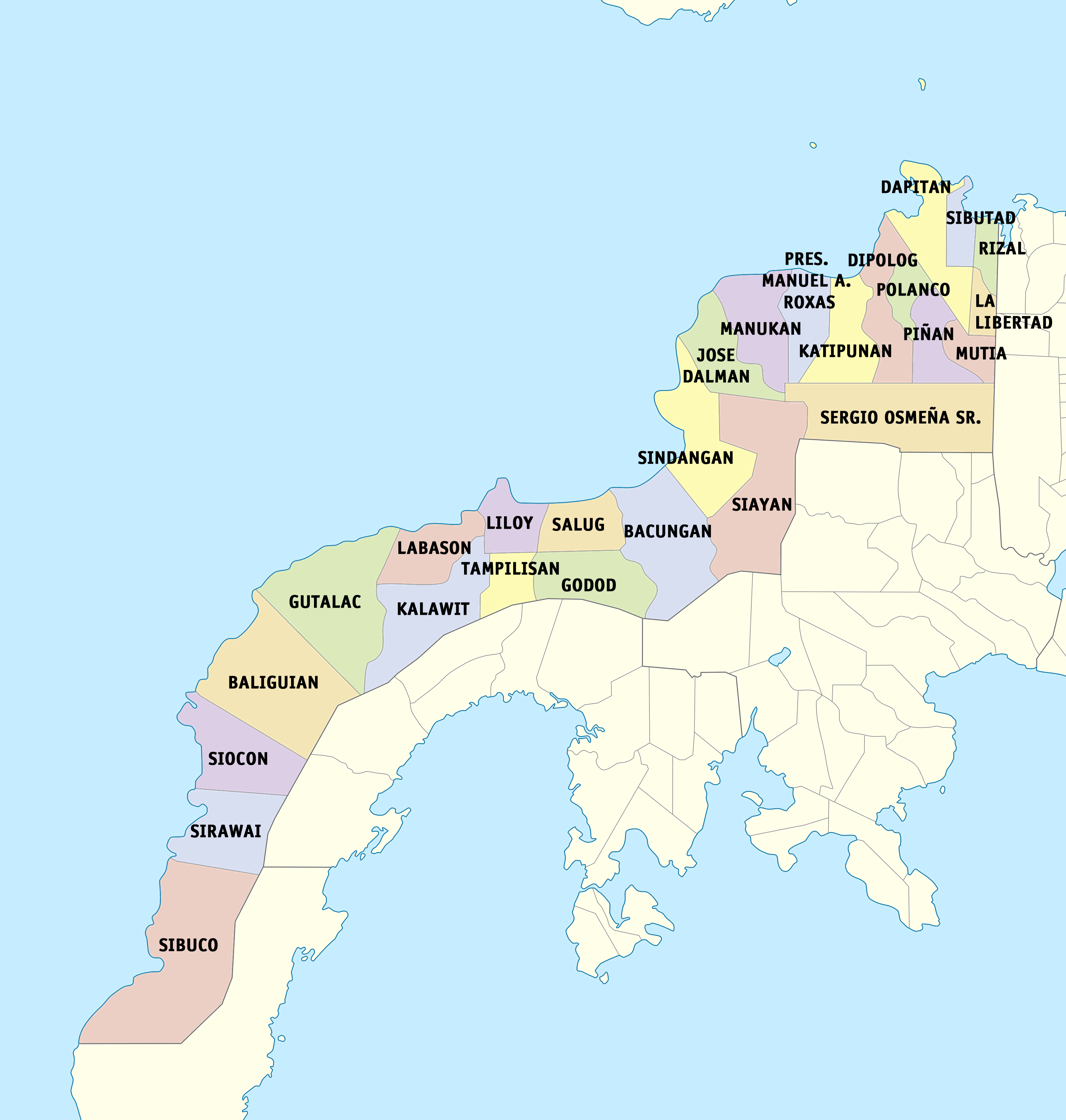
Political map of the province

Zamboanga del Norte comprises 25 municipalities and 2 cities. Dipolog, Sindangan, and Dapitan are the most densely populated areas in the province. These are further subdivided into 691 barangays, and clustered into 3 congressional districts.

Sibuco is the largest municipality by land area, constituting 10.72% (782.54 square kilometers) of the total provincial area, while Sindangan is the most populous municipality. Sibutad is the smallest, with 0.90% (65.57 square kilometers).

- † Provincial capital and component city
- ∗ Component city
- Municipality

| City or municipality | | District | Population | | | ±% p.a. | Area | | Density | | Barangay | Coordinates^{[A]} |
| | | | (2020) | | (2015) | | km^{2} | sq mi | /km^{2} | /sq mi | | |
|---|---|---|---|---|---|---|---|---|---|---|---|---|
| Baliguian | | 3rd | 2.3% | 23,771 | 22,588 | +0.98% | 439.26 | 169.60 | 54 | 140 | 17 | 7°48′38″N 122°08′43″E |
| Dapitan City | ∗ | 1st | 8.1% | 85,202 | 82,418 | +0.63% | 390.53 | 150.78 | 220 | 570 | 50 | 8°39′17″N 123°25′20″E |
| Dipolog City | † | 2nd | 13.2% | 138,141 | 130,759 | +1.05% | 241.13 | 93.10 | 570 | 1,500 | 21 | 8°35′10″N 123°20′28″E |
| Godod | | 3rd | 1.7% | 17,510 | 17,424 | +0.09% | 190.00 | 73.36 | 92 | 240 | 17 | 7°59′54″N 122°50′30″E |
| Gutalac | | 3rd | 3.4% | 36,090 | 34,654 | +0.78% | 492.86 | 190.29 | 73 | 190 | 33 | 7°58′21″N 122°23′58″E |
| Jose Dalman | | 2nd | 2.8% | 28,881 | 27,388 | +1.02% | 135.00 | 52.12 | 210 | 540 | 18 | 8°26′33″N 123°01′20″E |
| Kalawit | | 3rd | 2.3% | 23,812 | 23,633 | +0.14% | 217.89 | 84.13 | 110 | 280 | 14 | 7°54′17″N 122°31′35″E |
| Katipunan | | 2nd | 4.3% | 44,661 | 45,577 | −0.39% | 244.12 | 94.26 | 180 | 470 | 30 | 8°30′46″N 123°17′05″E |
| La Libertad | | 1st | 0.8% | 8,119 | 8,406 | −0.66% | 69.51 | 26.84 | 120 | 310 | 13 | 8°28′07″N 123°31′33″E |
| Labason | | 3rd | 4.2% | 43,934 | 41,357 | +1.16% | 169.58 | 65.48 | 260 | 670 | 20 | 8°03′52″N 122°31′28″E |
| Leon B. Postigo | | 3rd | 2.6% | 27,639 | 26,221 | +1.01% | 255.50 | 98.65 | 110 | 280 | 18 | 8°09′10″N 122°55′30″E |
| Liloy | | 3rd | 4.0% | 42,213 | 39,812 | +1.12% | 128.43 | 49.59 | 330 | 850 | 37 | 8°07′24″N 122°40′45″E |
| Manukan | | 2nd | 3.5% | 36,887 | 36,526 | +0.19% | 246.35 | 95.12 | 150 | 390 | 22 | 8°30′57″N 123°05′38″E |
| Mutia | | 1st | 1.1% | 11,726 | 12,675 | −1.47% | 73.58 | 28.41 | 160 | 410 | 16 | 8°25′12″N 123°28′34″E |
| Piñan | | 1st | 1.9% | 20,221 | 20,161 | +0.06% | 93.75 | 36.20 | 220 | 570 | 22 | 8°28′45″N 123°26′59″E |
| Polanco | | 1st | 4.0% | 42,265 | 39,347 | +1.37% | 206.88 | 79.88 | 200 | 520 | 30 | 8°31′52″N 123°21′46″E |
| President Manuel A. Roxas | | 2nd | 3.7% | 39,198 | 39,323 | −0.06% | 206.25 | 79.63 | 190 | 490 | 31 | 8°30′51″N 123°13′57″E |
| Rizal | | 1st | 1.4% | 15,052 | 14,021 | +1.36% | 80.03 | 30.90 | 190 | 490 | 22 | 8°31′32″N 123°33′06″E |
| Salug | | 3rd | 3.1% | 32,134 | 32,204 | −0.04% | 206.60 | 79.77 | 160 | 410 | 23 | 8°06′25″N 122°45′25″E |
| Sergio Osmeña Sr. | | 1st | 3.0% | 31,942 | 30,220 | +1.06% | 556.44 | 214.84 | 57 | 150 | 39 | 8°17′57″N 123°30′30″E |
| Siayan | | 2nd | 3.5% | 36,236 | 34,966 | +0.68% | 494.75 | 191.02 | 73 | 190 | 22 | 8°15′05″N 123°06′48″E |
| Sibuco | | 3rd | 3.4% | 36,049 | 34,620 | +0.77% | 782.54 | 302.14 | 46 | 120 | 28 | 7°17′32″N 122°04′00″E |
| Sibutad | | 1st | 1.7% | 17,453 | 17,645 | −0.21% | 65.57 | 25.32 | 270 | 700 | 16 | 8°36′45″N 123°28′48″E |
| Sindangan | | 2nd | 9.9% | 103,952 | 99,435 | +0.85% | 451.00 | 174.13 | 230 | 600 | 52 | 8°14′03″N 122°59′57″E |
| Siocon | | 3rd | 4.6% | 48,524 | 46,907 | +0.65% | 503.20 | 194.29 | 96 | 250 | 26 | 7°42′24″N 122°08′22″E |
| Sirawai | | 3rd | 3.0% | 31,163 | 28,799 | +1.51% | 222.50 | 85.91 | 140 | 360 | 34 | 7°35′14″N 122°08′24″E |
| Tampilisan | | 3rd | 2.4% | 24,680 | 24,307 | +0.29% | 137.75 | 53.19 | 180 | 470 | 20 | 7°58′27″N 122°39′51″E |
| Total | | | | 1,047,455 | 1,011,393 | +0.67% | 7,300.11 | 2,818.59 | 140 | 360 | 691 | (see GeoGroup box) |
1. Coordinates are sortable by latitude. (Italicized entries indicate the generic location. Otherwise, they mark the city or town center).

== Demographics ==
Population census of Zamboanga del Norte

| Year | Pop. | ±% p.a. |
|---|---|---|
| 1903 | 23,577 | — |
| 1918 | 57,255 | +6.09% |
| 1939 | 138,849 | +4.31% |
| 1948 | 167,700 | +2.12% |
| 1960 | 281,429 | +4.41% |
| 1970 | 409,379 | +3.81% |
| 1975 | 490,515 | +3.69% |
| 1980 | 588,015 | +3.69% |

| Year | Pop. | ±% p.a. |
|---|---|---|
| 1990 | 676,862 | +1.42% |
| 1995 | 770,697 | +2.46% |
| 2000 | 823,130 | +1.42% |
| 2007 | 907,238 | +1.35% |
| 2010 | 957,997 | +2.00% |
| 2015 | 1,011,393 | +1.04% |
| 2020 | 1,047,455 | +0.74% |
| 2024 | 1,067,067 | +0.45% |

Source: Philippine Statistics Authority

The population of Zamboanga del Norte in the 2020 census was 1,047,455 people, with a density of 140 inhabitants per square kilometre or 360 inhabitants per square mile. Dipolog is the most populated locality in the province, followed by the town of Sindangan and city of Dapitan.

The main language spoken is Cebuano. Other languages include Chavacano, Subanon, Tausūg, Samal, Filipino, and English.

=== Religion ===
The predominant religion was Islam until the Spanish regime took over the region and spread Christianity with the help of the church's mission orders like the Jesuits, Augustinians, and Dominicans. The province's first martyr of faith, soon to be raised as a saint, in Mindanao island was Padre Francesco Palliola, S.J. He was a Jesuit missionary from Nola, Italy, and was assigned to Zamboanga Peninsula. He was active as a missionary in Lubungan (Katipuan), Zamboanga del Norte, Iligan, Dapitan, and met his martyrdom at the barrio of Ponot, now a town of Jose Dalman. Roman Catholicism is a significant majority with about 50% adherence. The province has one diocese – the Roman Catholic Diocese of Dipolog under the Archdiocese of Ozamis, covering the entire province. There are also followers of other Christian sects.

== Government ==
=== Officials ===
These are the officials after the local elections of 2025:

Governor: Darel Dexter T. Uy (Lakas)

Vice Governor: Julius C. Napigquit (Lakas)

Members of the House of Representatives:

- 1st District: Rep. Roberto "Pinpin" T. Uy Jr. (Lakas)
- 2nd District: Irene "Ate Ai" G. Labadlabad (Lakas)
- 3rd District: Rep. Adrian Michael "Ian" A. Amatong (LP)

=== Board Members ===
- 1st District:
  - Dario M. Mandantes
  - Jimmy Patrick Israel "Jimboy" B. Chan
- 2nd District:
  - Peter Y. Co
  - Dante G. Bagarinao
  - Michael "Jojo" M. Documento II
  - Richard "Chady" G. Yebes
- 3rd Drstrict:
  - Kay Marie P. Bolando
  - Leo Nicanor B. Mejorada
  - Venus A. Uy
  - Jeff Raymund "JR" M. Brillantes

== Economy ==
Poverty incidence of Zamboanga del Norte (%)

Source: Philippine Statistics Authority

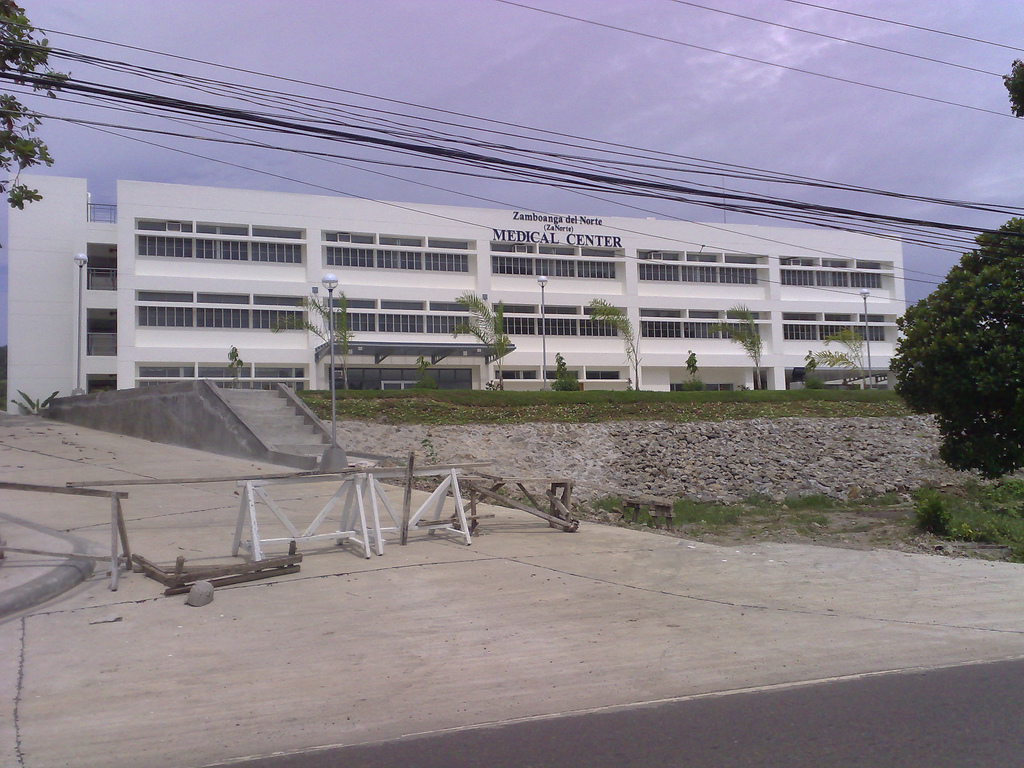
Zamboanga del Norte Medical Center in Dipolog

About half of the province's land area is devoted to agriculture. Corn, coconut, and rice are the major crops. The province being rich in marine and mineral sources, its fish production has accelerated through the development of fishponds. Commercial fishing has steadily increased through the years, with the yellow fin tuna as the primary species.

In 2006, a study by National Statistics Coordination Board (NSCB), found Zamboanga del Norte Province to be the Philippines' poorest province with a poverty incidence rate of 64.6%, an increase from 47% in year 2000 statistical figures.

As of 2015, the province's poverty incidence has dropped to 51.6% (ranking 8th). Large foreign mining companies operating within the province such as Canadian company TVI Resource Development and Philex Mining Corp. cause adverse effects to the culture and traditions of the indigenous Subanon and other poor settlers.

== Notable people ==
- José Rizal - national hero who was exiled in Dapitan by the Spanish colonial authorities
- Martha Cecilia - Filipino writer of Tagalog romance pocketbook novels
- Gazini Ganados - Filipino fashion model and beauty pageant titleholder who became Binibining Pilipinas 2019 Universe and part of Top 20 of Miss Universe 2019
- Theodore Boborol - A renowned film and television director in the Philippines
- Matias Castillon Ranillo Sr. - governor of the undivided Province of Zamboanga (1937–1940) and Lone District Congressman of the same province (1941–1946)
- Roseller Barinaga - former Undersecretary for Mindanao of the National Anti-Poverty Commission (2017 - 2018), former congressman of 2nd District of Zamboanga del Norte (1998 - 2007), former City Mayor (1978 - 1986; 1988 - 1998) and Vice Mayor of Dipolog (1970 - 1978),
- Roberto Uy - Former Governor of Zamboanga del Norte (2013 - 2022); City Mayor of Dipolog (1998 - 2007; 2025–Present)
- Zorro Aguilar - lawyer, activist, newspaper editor, and martial law victim.
- Amatong family
  - Jacobo Amatong - lawyer, editor-publisher for Mindanao Observer, former city councilor of Dipolog (1971 - his death) and martial law victim.
  - Prospero Amatong - former mayor of Nabunturan (1980 - 1986); former governor of the provinces of Davao del Norte (1988 - 1998) and Compostela Valley (now Davao de Oro) (3 months in 1998), and former congressman of 2nd District of Compostela Valley (1998 - 2007)
  - Juanita Amatong - educator, banker, and former secretary of the Department of Finance (2003–2005)
  - Isagani Amatong - lawyer, Congressman of 3rd District of Zamboanga del Norte (2013–present), former governor of Zamboanga del Norte (1986 - 1995; 1998 - 2004), and former City Councilor of Dipolog (1984 - 1986)
- Margarito "Gary" Teves - former congressman of Negros Oriental's 3rd District and former secretary of the Department of Finance (2005–2010)
- Bobby Nalzaro - Cebu-based news anchor for GMA Cebu, radio anchor for Super Radyo Cebu, and newspaper columnist for SunStar Cebu
- Jerry Barbaso - Filipino footballer who last played as a defender for Ceres–Negros F.C. in the Philippines Football League, and Philippines national football team
- Eddie Laure - Filipino former professional basketball player (1998 - 2016), and basketball coach (assistant coach for UST Tigresses in UAAP since 2016, and Biñan City Heroes in MPBL since 2018)
- Chico Alicaya - Pinoy Big Brother: Connect contestant from Dipolog City but represented Cebu who fell short for Big Four.
- Kobie Brown - a Filipino-British actor from Dipolog who competed at Pinoy Big Brother: Connect and won 3rd big placer representing Parañaque.
- Marie Razel Eguia - Miss Philippines Earth 2008 contestant representing Dipolog and crowned Miss Philippines Air (1st Runner-Up) in the same competition
- Rene Mark Cuarto - Professional Boxer
- Adolfo Sevilla Azcuna - Philippine Judicial Academy (PHILJA) Chancellor (since June 1, 2009) and the 153rd Associate Justice of the Supreme Court of the Philippines (October 24, 2002 – February 15, 2009).
- Eddie Laure
- Resil Mojares - Cebu City-based historian and literary critic; National Artist of the Philippines for Literature
- Pinpin Uy -congressman of 2nd District of Zamboanga del Norte (2023–Present)
- Most Rev. Severo Caermare, D.D. - bishop of Dipolog
- Junrey Balawing - former Filipino record holder for the world's shortest man alive
- General Alexander B. Yano - 38th Chief of Staff of the Armed Forces of the Philippines
- Jonathan "Lightning" Taconing - Filipino boxer
