= Casa Bernedo =

Historic mansion in Zamboanga del Norte, Philippines

- Balay Bernedo (Cebuano)
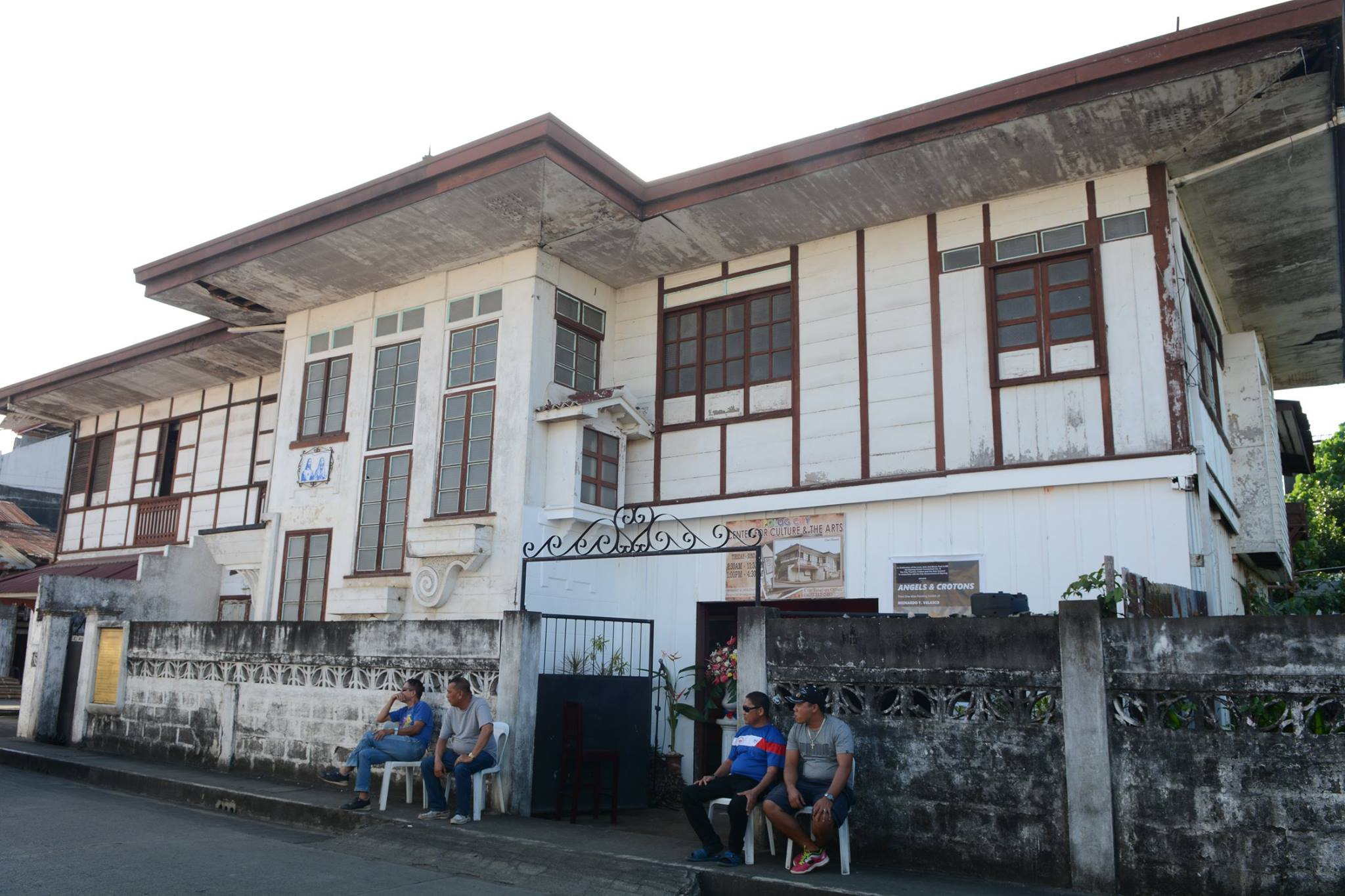
- Casa Bernedo facing Arellano Street
- Interactive map of the Casa Bernedo area
- Alternative names: Bernedo Ancestral House; Dipolog City Center for the Culture and the Arts

General information
- Status: Completed
- Type: Mansion
- Location: Zamboanga del Norte, Arellano Street corner Ranillo Street, Dipolog, Philippines
- Coordinates: 8°35′17″N 123°20′21″E
- Completed: Pre-20th century
- Closed: c. 2024
- Owner: Bernedo-Macias family

Technical details
- Material: Stone; Wood
- Floor count: 2

Design and construction
- Designations: Ancestral house

Casa Bernedo, also known as the Bernedo Ancestral House, was a two-storey ancestral house in Dipolog, Zamboanga del Norte in the Philippines.

== History ==
The house was the residence of the then-influential Bernedo family of Dipolog. It was built by the turn of the 20th century by a Spaniard named Justo Bernedo and his wife Isabel Macias, a Filipina from Dipolog, where they raised their nine children together. The Bernedo house largely retained its original structure, only undergoing a minor renovation shortly after the end of World War II. Known to be an influential and a religious family in Dipolog's earliest days, the Bernedos hosted numerous dignitaries and VIPs who visited Dipolog in the house, including the town's Catholic church clergy and Philippine President Ramon Magsaysay.

Following the death of the last of the nine surviving Bernedo-Macias siblings in 2008, the Bernedo house was closed permanently. On July 1, 2012, the Bernedo house, now named Casa Bernedo, was reopened to the public as the Dipolog City Center for the Culture and the Arts in time for the city's centenary to be observed exactly a year later.

== The house today ==
Since 2012, Casa Bernedo served as a museum and art gallery. The lower floor, which was said to be a small storage house or warehouse (commonly known as a bodega), served as a venue for visual art and photography exhibits. Another room on the lower floor was used as a local gun store, until that space was occupied as the city's tourism office by the City Government of Dipolog.

The second floor, where the Bernedo-Macias family once lived, was a museum preserving the family house's interior and arrangements. The floors and home appliances were made of Philippine hardwood, and their kitchen appliances were imported from the United States. It was said that the kitchen, also on the upper floor, had a story on Dipolog becoming the Spanish sardine capital today when Isabel Macias Bernedo would make Spanish-styled sardines which she learned from her sister Concepcion Macias Montaño every summer. Casa Bernedo was open to the public free of charge.

=== Closure ===
As of 2024, Casa Bernedo and, to a great extent, the Dipolog City Center for the Culture and the Arts were closed to the public and were put up for sale. The City Tourism Office has transferred to the Dipolog Tourist Hub at the Dipolog Boulevard.

== See also ==
- Dipolog
- Dipolog Boulevard
