= DXKD =

Radio station in Zamboanga del Norte, Philippines

Radyo Ronda Dipolog (DXKD)

Dipolog; Philippines
- Broadcast area: Eastern Zamboanga del Norte and surrounding areas
- Frequency: 1053 kHz
- Branding: RPN DXKD Radyo Ronda

Programming
- Languages: Cebuano, Filipino
- Format: News, Public Affairs, Talk, Drama
- Network: Radyo Ronda

Ownership
- Owner: Radio Philippines Network

History
- First air date: September 11, 1968
- Former frequencies: 1040 kHz (1968–1978)
- Call sign meaning: Kanlaon Dipolog

Technical information
- Licensing authority: NTC
- Power: 1,000 watts
- ERP: 5,000 watts

Links
- Webcast: Listen Live
- Website: Radyo Ronda Dipolog Website

DXKD (1053 AM) Radyo Ronda is a radio station owned and operated by Radio Philippines Network. The station studios are located at the 2nd floor of Sagario Building, National Highway, Turno, Dipolog. It is the pioneer AM radio station in the province.

== Incidents and controversies ==
- In 2012, DXKD station manager and news anchor Leo Cimafranca was reprimanded by the Dipolog City Council for accusing then-Mayor Evelyn Uy and her allies of terrorism with the upcoming 2013 local elections.
