= Dipolog =

Capital city of Zamboanga del Norte, Philippines

- Component city
- City of Dipolog, Dakbayan sa Dipolog
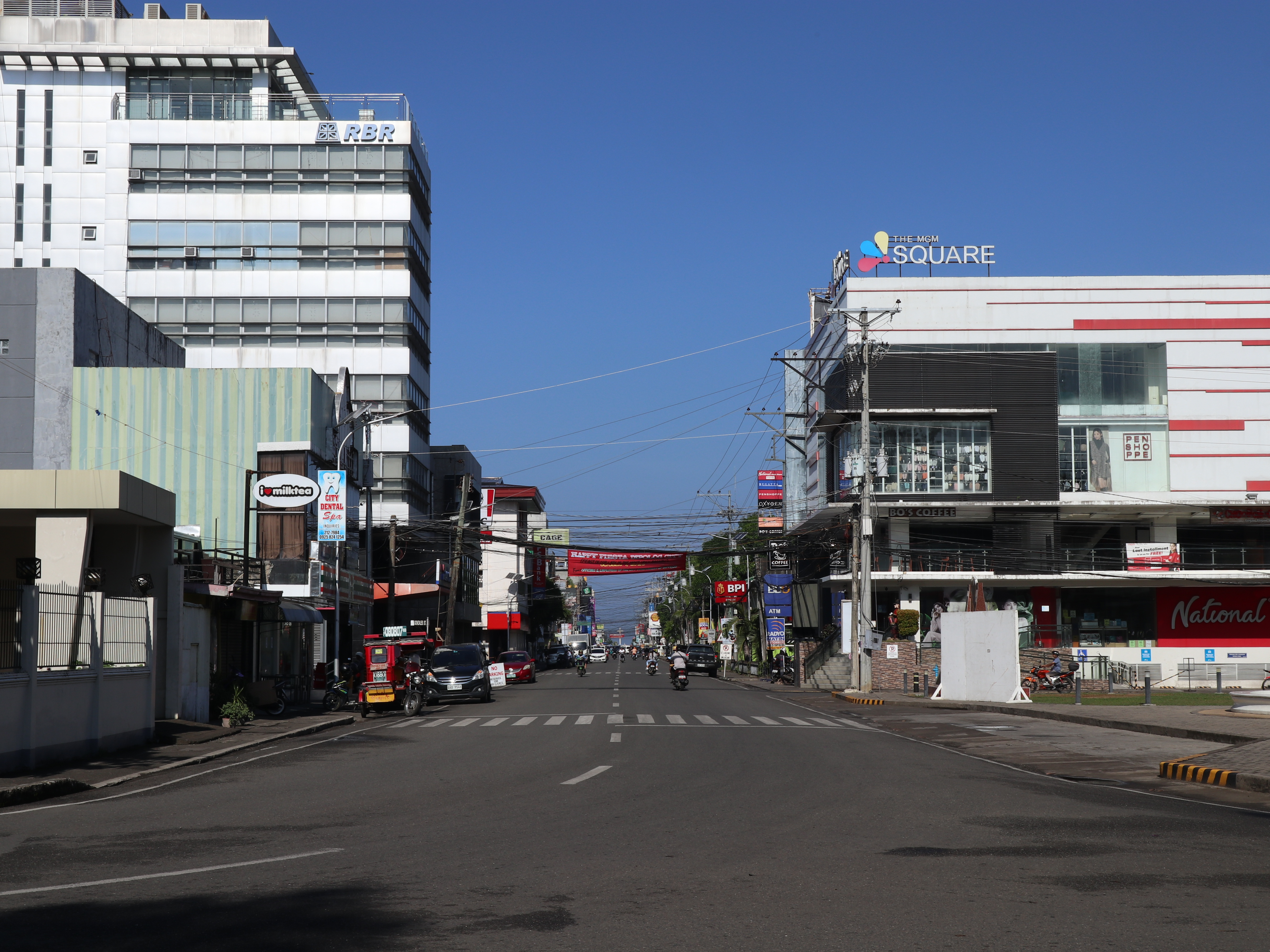
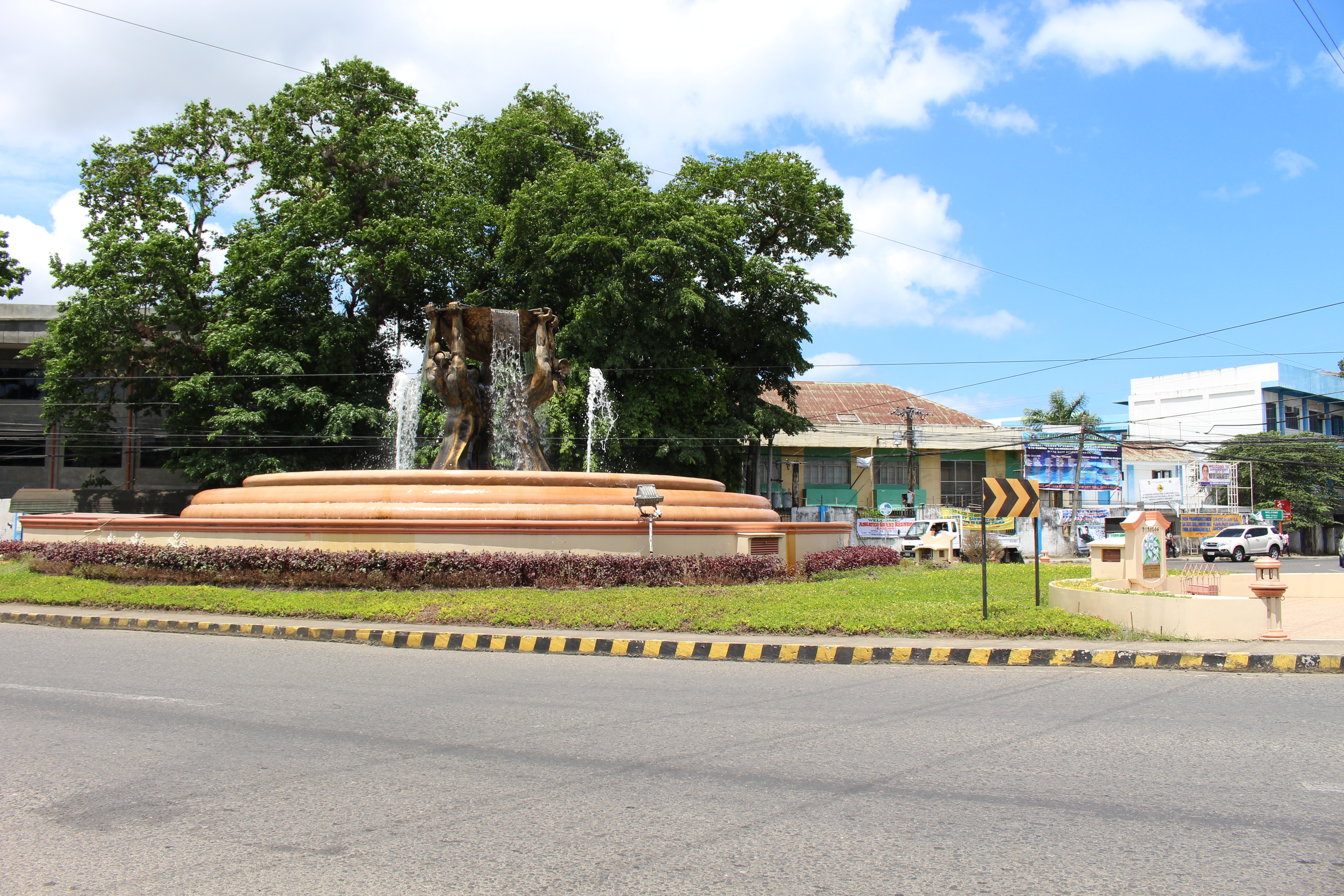
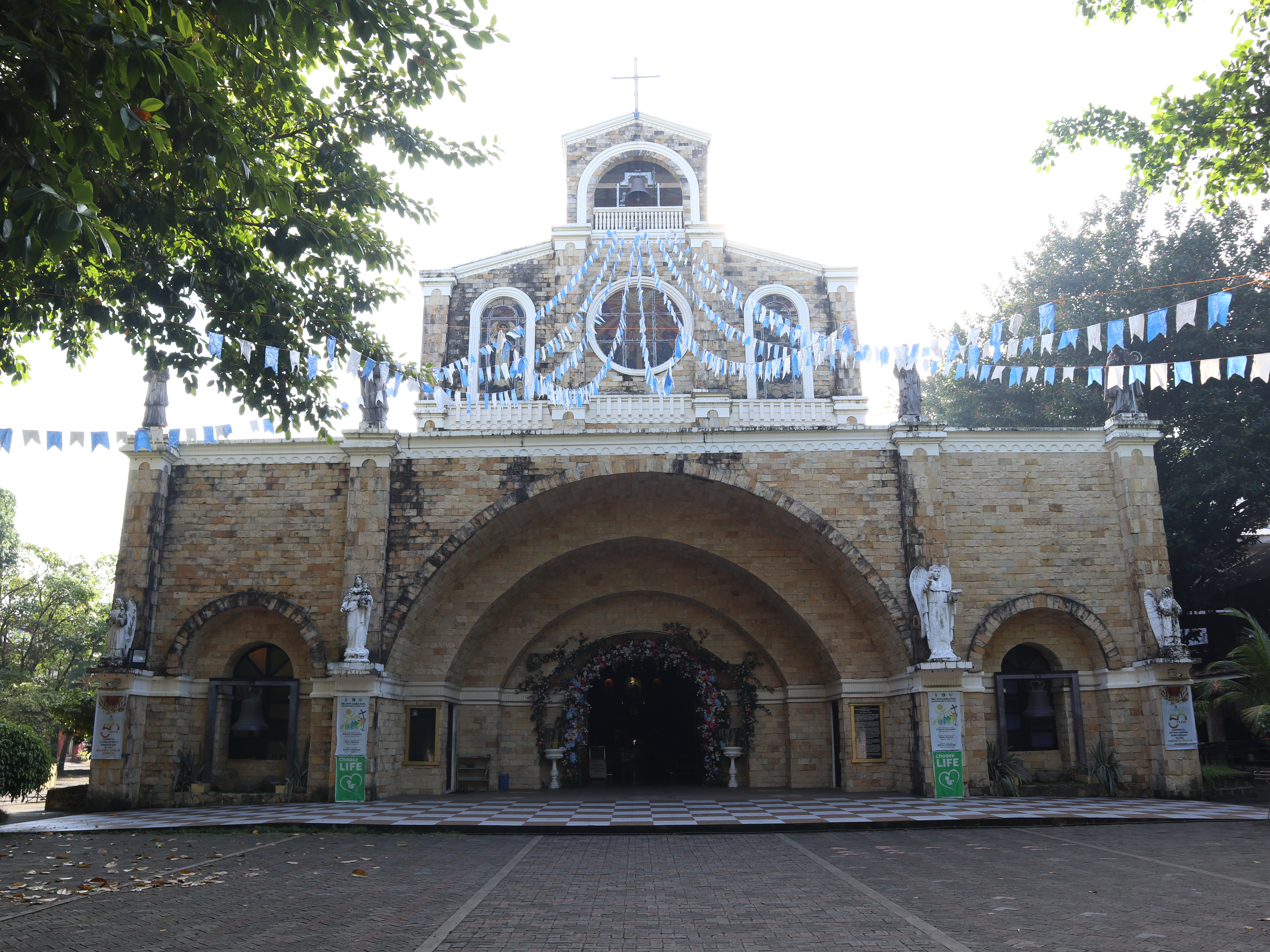
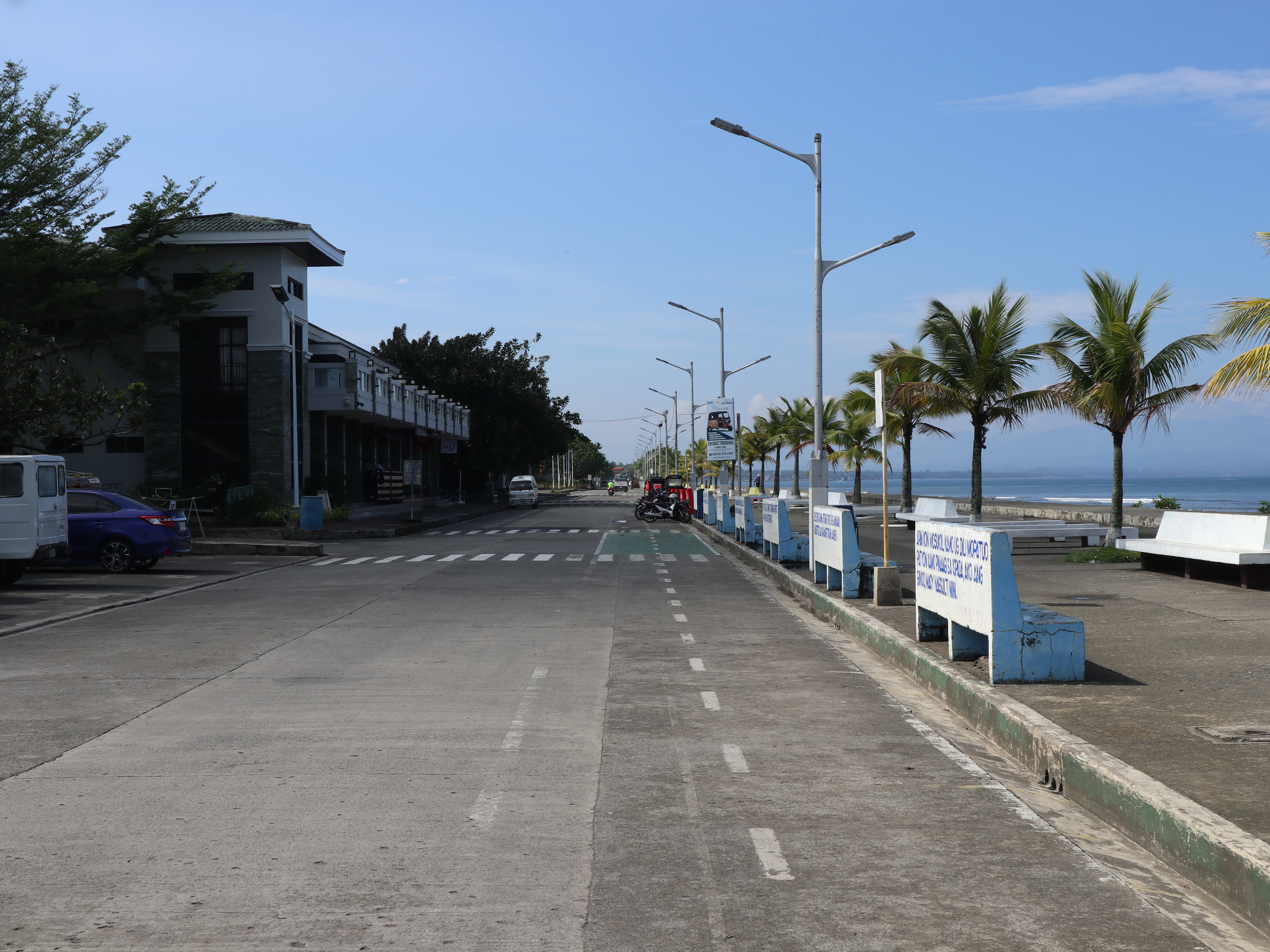
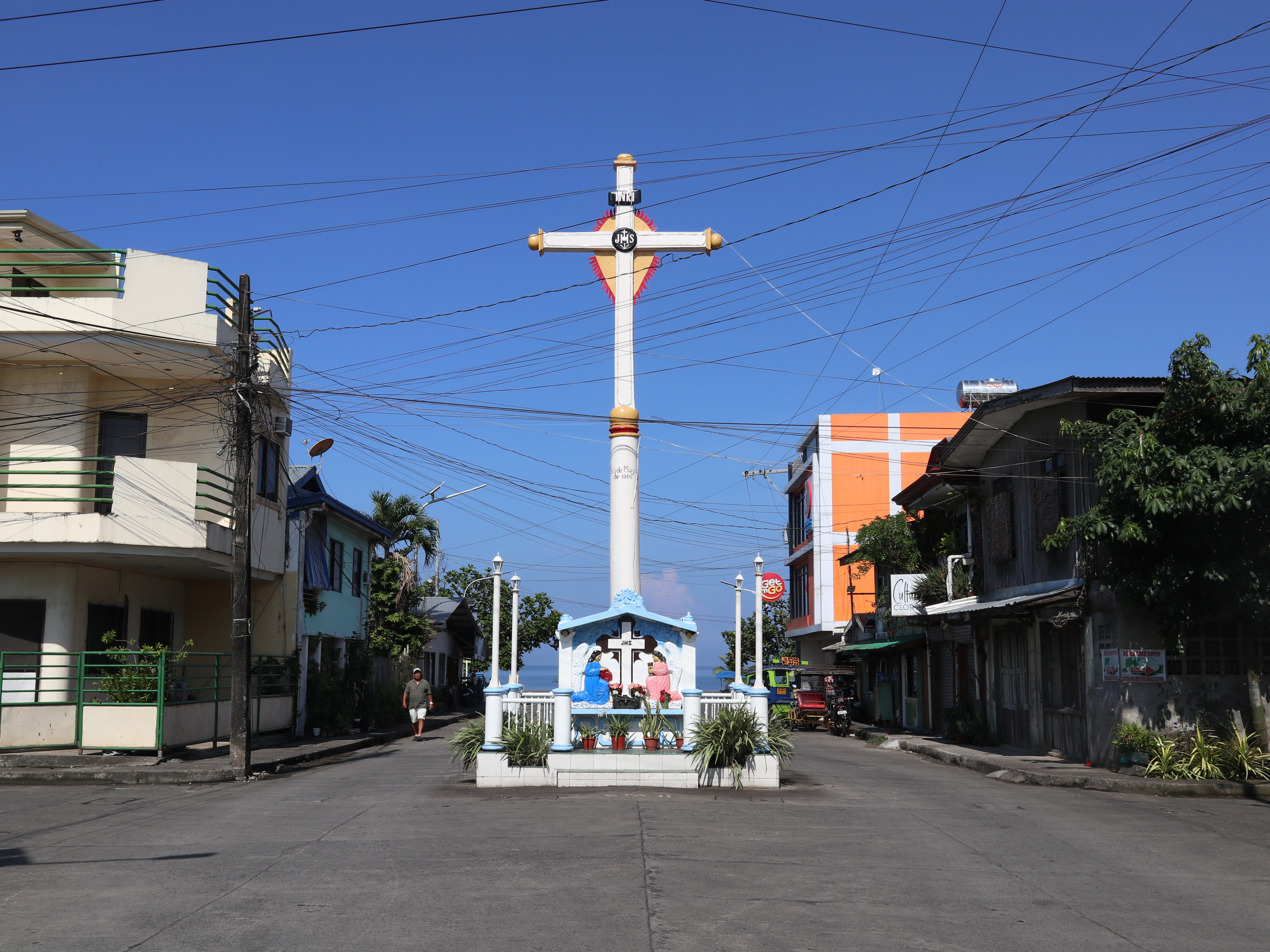
- Rizal Avenue Dipolog City Hall P'gsalabuk Circle at the Rotonda Dipolog Cathedral Dipolog Boulevard Santa Cruz Marker

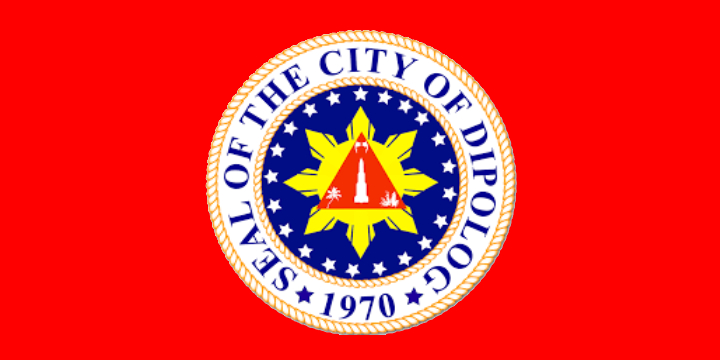
- Flag Seal
- Etymology: Dipag
- Nicknames: Tulwanan; Orchid City of the Philippines; Bottled Sardines Capital of the Philippines; Gateway to Western Mindanao
- Anthem: Dipolog City March
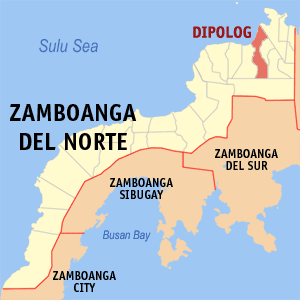
- Map of Zamboanga del Norte with Dipolog highlighted
- Interactive map of Dipolog
- Location within the Philippines
- Coordinates: 8°35′14″N 123°20′27″E
- Country: Philippines
- Region: Zamboanga Peninsula
- Province: Zamboanga del Norte
- District: 2nd district
- Founded: 1834
- Annexation to Dapitan: March 4, 1904
- Chartered: July 1, 1913
- Cityhood: January 1, 1970
- Barangays: 21 (see Barangays)

Government
  - Type: Sangguniang Panlungsod
  - Mayor: Roberto Y. Uy (Lakas)
  - Vice Mayor: Senen O. Angeles (Lakas)
  - Representative: Irene G. Labadlabad (Lakas)
  - Councilors: Members: Ryan Niel A. Asprer; James Cyril L. Ruiz III; Jonald C. Napigquit; Roseller L. Barinaga; Harrison T. Young; Kenny Val U. Ong; Romulo P. Soliva; Raul C. Barbaso; Praxides P. Rubia; Ofelia G. Acis; Irvin A. Banga (ABC); Kristine Irish May M. Cuenca (SK)
  - Electorate: 98,238 voters (2025)

Area
  - Total: 241.13 km^{2} (93.10 sq mi)
- Elevation: 49 m (161 ft)
- Highest elevation: 734 m (2,408 ft)
- Lowest elevation: 0 m (0 ft)

Population (2024 census)
  - Total: 136,528
  - Density: 566.20/km^{2} (1,466.5/sq mi)
  - Households: 33,154

Economy
  - Income class: 2nd city income class
  - Poverty incidence: 22.04% (2023)
  - Revenue: ₱ 1,121 million (2024)
  - Assets: ₱ 2,348 million (2024)
  - Expenditure: ₱ 489.8 million (2024)
  - Liabilities: ₱ 914.4 million (2024)

Service provider
  - Electricity: Zamboanga del Norte Electric Cooperative (ZANECO)
  - Water: Dipolog City Water District (DipCWD)
  - Telecommunications: PLDT, Globe, Smart
  - Cable TV: Orient Cable, Cignal TV
- Time zone: UTC+08:00 (PST)
- ZIP code: 7100
- PSGC: 0907202000
- IDD : area code: +63 (0)65
- Native languages: Subanon; Cebuano; Chavacano; Tagalog
- Catholic diocese: Diocese of Dipolog
- Patron saint: Our Lady of the Most Holy Rosary (primary); Vincent Ferrer (secondary)
- Abbreviations: DPL, DPLG
- Website: www.dipologcity.gov.ph

Dipolog ([diˈpɔʔlɔg]), officially the City of Dipolog, (Note: Cebuano: Dakbayan sa Dipolog; Subanen: Gembagel G'benwa Dipuleg/Bagbenwa Dipuleg; Filipino: Lungsod ng Dipolog) is a component city and capital of the province of Zamboanga del Norte, Philippines. According to the 2024 census, it has a population of 136,528 people making it the most populous in the province.

Geographically, the city is surrounded by rolling hills to the southeast and the Sulu Sea to the north. Dipolog is known for its wild orchids and its sardine industry which stems from the rich fishing area off its shores. It is known as the "Gateway to Western Mindanao" through the Western Nautical Highway and has also been called the "Bottled Sardines Capital of the Philippines."

Dipolog can be reached by plane via Dipolog Airport or by ferry at the Galas Port in Barangay Galas or at nearby Pulauan Port in Dapitan. The development of the Port of Dipolog, a roll-on/roll-off facility at Barangay Galas, will allow for the eventual transfer of the service to Dipolog while retaining inter-island operations at Pulauan, which is a base port.

A popular city attraction is the foreshore Dipolog Boulevard which, though still in its second phase of construction, has become a popular haven for exercise and leisure. It is also the site for various celebrations and festivals in the city. In the third phase of the project, the length of the boulevard will be extended to reach the seaport in Barangay Galas.

== History ==
=== Spanish regime ===
The town appeared in the 1734 Murillo Velarde map as Diporog.

Earliest recorded political history of Dipolog started in 1834 with the re-organization of Spanish Provincial Government of Misamis. At that time, Tulwanan's political territory was still part of the Municipality of Dapitan with Don Domingo Ruiz, a native, as its capitán or town executive. Sometime that year, a Spanish Recollect missionary arrived in Tulwanan looking for its barrio executive or local chieftain. Upon meeting a native, the missionary asked; "¿Dónde está el capitán?" or "Where is the captain?". The native understanding only the word "capitán" pointed to the west and said in Subanen Di-pag, meaning across the river. Guided by his servant, a Tagalog boy named Antonio Subido, the missionary proceeded down river and upon reaching the Boholano settlement, named the place "Dipag".

Technically, Dipag and Tulwanan were two different settlements at that time with the former composed of Boholano natives and the latter mostly of Subanen ancestry. When the friar returned to Dapitan, he identified the location of the larger Boholano settlement as Dipag but was not officially written. Frequent conversations by the Spaniards pronounced it in Spanish accent Dipolog which was eventually adopted by the natives. The final political survey surprisingly added the letter 'L' written on it after officially becoming a barrio of Dapitan. From that time Tulwanan's political identity ceased to exist. By the 12th century the Subanen settlers had colonized most of what is now Zamboanga Peninsula region. It was customary for tribes to establish their settlements at the mouth of large river systems due to the abundant food supply. However, due to frequent raids from seafaring Chinese pirates, they decided to move their settlements inland.

In the 14th century, Tulwanan was established 6 kilometers inland, adjoining the river near the present day barangay center of Lugdungan.

In the 15th century, settlers from neighboring Negros and Bohol islands established coastline settlements in Mindanao but suffered the same raids by Chinese pirates, prompting them to also move their settlements away from the coastline. They established another settlement in what is now called Sianib, a barangay of present-day Polanco town, some twenty kilometers from the coast at Barrio Gulayon(Barangay Gulayon).

It was only in 1563 that the first recorded Visayan settlement of some 800 families from Bohol, led by the chieftain Datu Pagbuaya, landed in Mindanao and established a coastal settlement in what is now called Dapitan. This settlement was strong enough to repel the Chinese pirates of the Sulu Sea. As a result, Dapitan Bay was scene of many bloody conflicts between Pagbuaya's men and Chinese pirates.

=== Mindanao's first Christian settlement ===
In 1565, Don Miguel López de Legazpi who was accompanied by famed navigator Fr. Andrés de Urdaneta, an Augustinian friar, visited the Boholano chieftain Datu Pagbuaya on the invitation of Datu Sikatuna. There they found the place of Datu Pagbuaya to be a thriving settlement. In his chronicle, Fr. Urdaneta named the place Daquepitan. Peter Kaerius (Pieter van den Keere) identified the location as Dapito in his cartographic map of 1598. It was later identified as "Dapite" in Robert Dudley's map of 1646. Other names ascribed to the location include "Dapyto" in Sanson's map of 1652 and "Dapitan" which can be found in Moll's map of the East Indies, 1729 and in Murillo Velarde's map of 1734. After Legazpi's visit, the Christianization of Mindanao was officially initiated by the Augustinian friars who arrived with him.

In 1581, members of The Society of Jesus came to the Philippines for the purpose of evangelization. When the country was divided among four religious orders in 1598, the Jesuits were given the Diocese of Cebu which covered the Visayas and Mindanao. Thus Dapitan came to be under the jurisdiction of the courageous men of St. Ignatius and it was Father Pascual de Acuña S.J. who started the Jesuit mission there.

In 1609, the squadron of Juan Juarez Gallinato S.J. defeated the Manguindanau Muslims in a ferocious battle near Dapitan.

Also in 1609, a permanent Dapitan mission was founded and thereafter headed by a Jesuit missionary, Father Pedro Gutierrez, marking Dapitan as the Center of Evangelization in Mindanao. Mission stations were subsequently established later by the Jesuits in Zamboanga, Iligan, Basilan and Butuan. Outside of these areas, however, the whole of Mindanao remained untouched by the Spanish Cross.

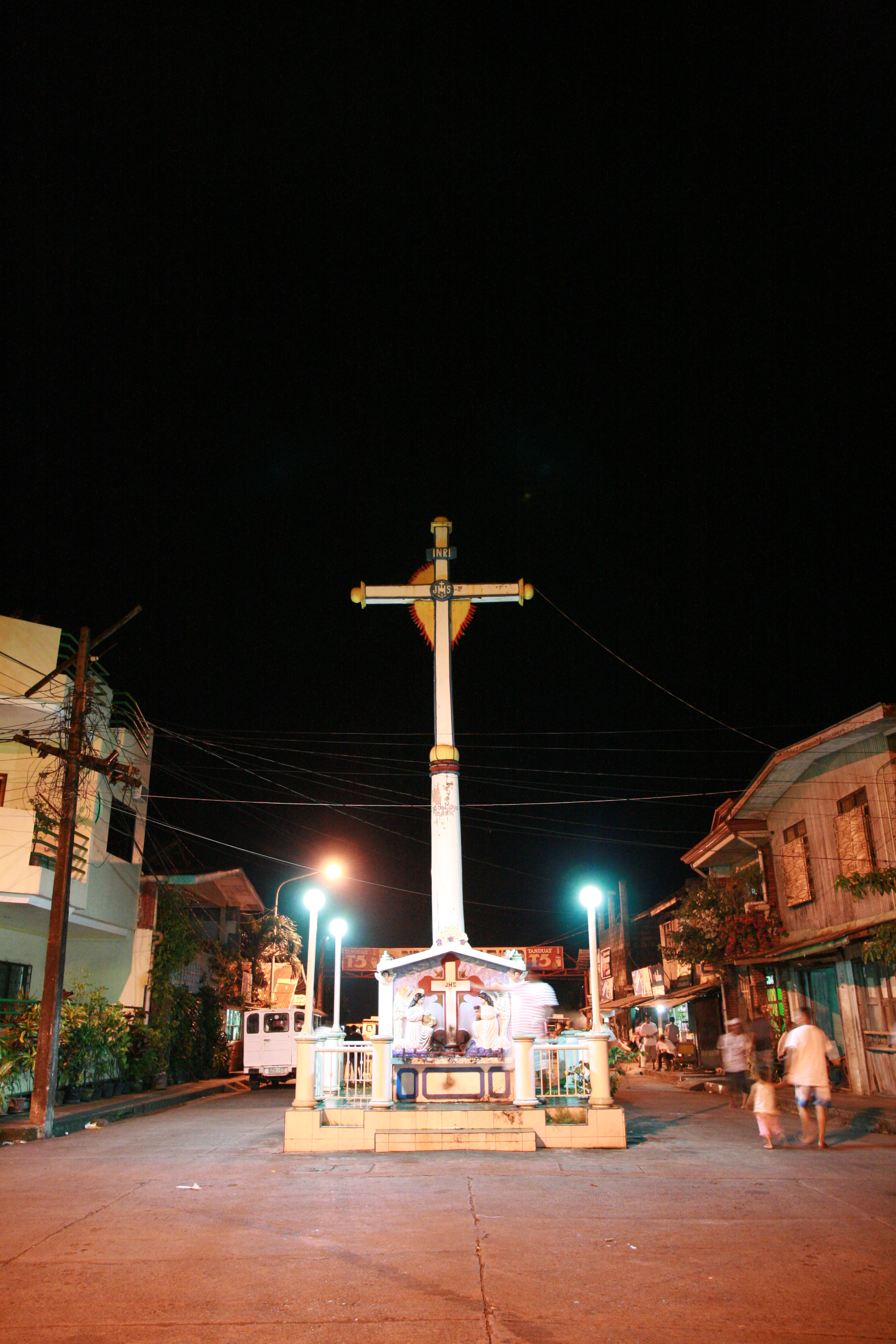
The Santa Cruz Marker (Punta Corro) is the spot where migrating Boholanos from the Visayas landed and established settlement.

By the 18th century, with the Spanish Naval Fleet anchored at Dapitan Bay, much of the piracy—now conducted mainly by moro bandits—was under control within the Sulu Sea. Settlement in coastal areas resumed with new settlers from Negros and Bohol eventually settling in Isab, and Nipaan. The largest settlement, however, was made at the mouth of the Dipolog river by the Boholanos who were not associated with Pagbuaya.

From Ruiz, civil administration changed hands in stable succession, with Martino Belarmino, who was popular by the name Maglinte. Francisco Magallanes, Victorio Gobune; another man whose name history record had as Toribio had his chance, followed by Venancio Narvaez, Francisco Orbita, Bautista Narvaez, Martencio Yebes and Sabino Bengua.

By 1889, administrative designations reverted to Capitanes, and those appointed were Martin Fernandez, Tomas Narvacan, Eustaquio Cajocon, Simplicio Lacaya, Basilio Tabiliran, Maximiano Ruiz and Bruno Ordinaria in 1898.

By February 1894, the Catholic Chapel constructed by the Jesuits was renovated for the first time, on an altar designed by Dr. José Rizal to which now stands the Our Lady of the Most Holy Rosary Cathedral.

By 1896, the friars established Dipolog as a regular parish and installed Father Esteban Yepes its first administrator in 1897.

=== American regime ===
After the transfer of Spanish sovereignty to the United States in 1897, the U.S. occupation forces renamed the Capitan to Presidente Local, with administrative support from a Vice Presidente Local, a Delegado de Justicia and a Delegado de Policia. Martin Fernandez was appointed Presidente Local in the year 1900, followed by Diosdado Mercado, Gaudencio Zorilla and Isidro Patangan as Presidente Municipal between 1901 and March 1904.

By 1900, Dipolog was a thriving commercial community with new settlers arriving from the island of Cebu, outgrowing its principal town of Dapitan which exclusively remained part of Pagbuaya's clan.

By 1910, John Helper, who was previously appointed Secretary of Zamboanga Province, visited Dipolog for two days and conversed with its principalía and members of the Centro Catolico de Dipolog. He was asked later of the possibility of converting the community to an independent Municipality.

By 1912, Gov. John J. Pershing of the Department of Mindanao and Sulu decreed the separation of Dipolog from Dapitan and reorganize as a municipality again.

By July 1, 1913, Gov. John J. Pershing declared Dipolog as a Municipality. General Pershing also appointed Pascual Tan Martinez, who was appointed the Municipal President of Dapitan since 1910, as its first Municipal Mayor.

The first public school teachers of Dipolog, during this time, came also from Bohol, particularly Maribojoc and other towns. Most were only elementary graduates, but they were well-educated by the American soldier-teachers in Bohol. One of them was a certain Felisa Ruaya who taught at the American-established schools in Dipolog. She lived first near the beach in Punta Corro. Then she married an Adriatico, a native of Polanco. Because the inhabitants converted to Christianity, it cannot be determined whether or not the residents were of Subanen heritage. Felisa Ruaya was the mother of former Zamboanga del Norte vice governor Concordio Ruaya Adriatico.

=== Japanese regime and World War II ===
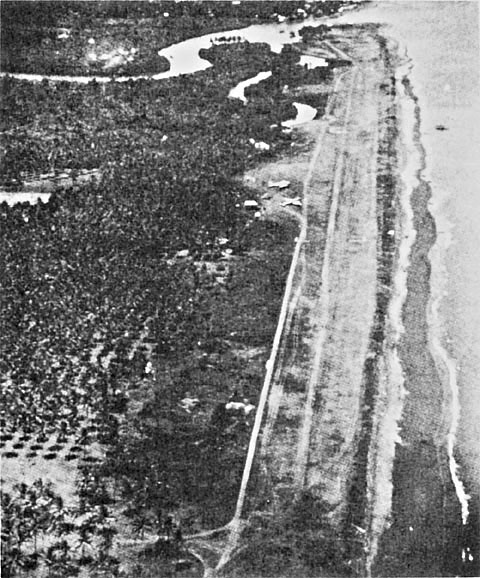
Aerial view of Dipolog Field in 1945.

Governor Matias Castillon Ranillo Sr. noticed that the waters at Punta Coro wharf were choppy for ships to anchor. Governor Ranillo was determined to provide an alternative access to southern Zamboanga peninsula. Governor Ranillo's jurisdiction was then the entire Zamboanga peninsula prior to its division between del Norte and del Sur. During Governor Ranillo's term, aviation was a young technology but he made sure that an airfield was established in Dipolog.

He was elected Governor in 1937 and re-elected in 1940 but his term was cut short when Philippine President Manuel L. Quezon urged him to run as the lone Assemblyman of Zamboanga peninsula. President Quezon fondly called him "El Gallo Escondido de Malacanang". In November 1941, he was elected as Assemblyman but one week before his scheduled departure for Manila, World War II broke out. On October 30, 1944, upon the request of the guerrillas, he mobilized the able-bodied men of Dipolog and Home guards who cheerfully volunteered to clear the airfield of grass and shrubs.

In 1942, when the Japanese invaded the Philippines, Zamboanga acting Governor Felipe B. Azcuna moved the capital from Zamboanga City to Dipolog. On March 8, 1945, on Dipolog airfield, the first American invasion of Zamboanga peninsula took place. The successful landing at Dipolog airfield established a base for the subsequent recapture of Japanese-held San Roque airfield near Zamboanga City, followed by Sanga Sanga in Sulu, and from there to Borneo and the East Indies. After the defeat of the American-Filipino forces in Corregidor, most of the province went under Japanese control. This designation lasted until June 16, 1948, when the capital was transferred from Dipolog to Molave, Zamboanga del Sur through Republic Act No. 286 signed by President Elpidio Quirino.

=== Philippine Republic and Cityhood ===
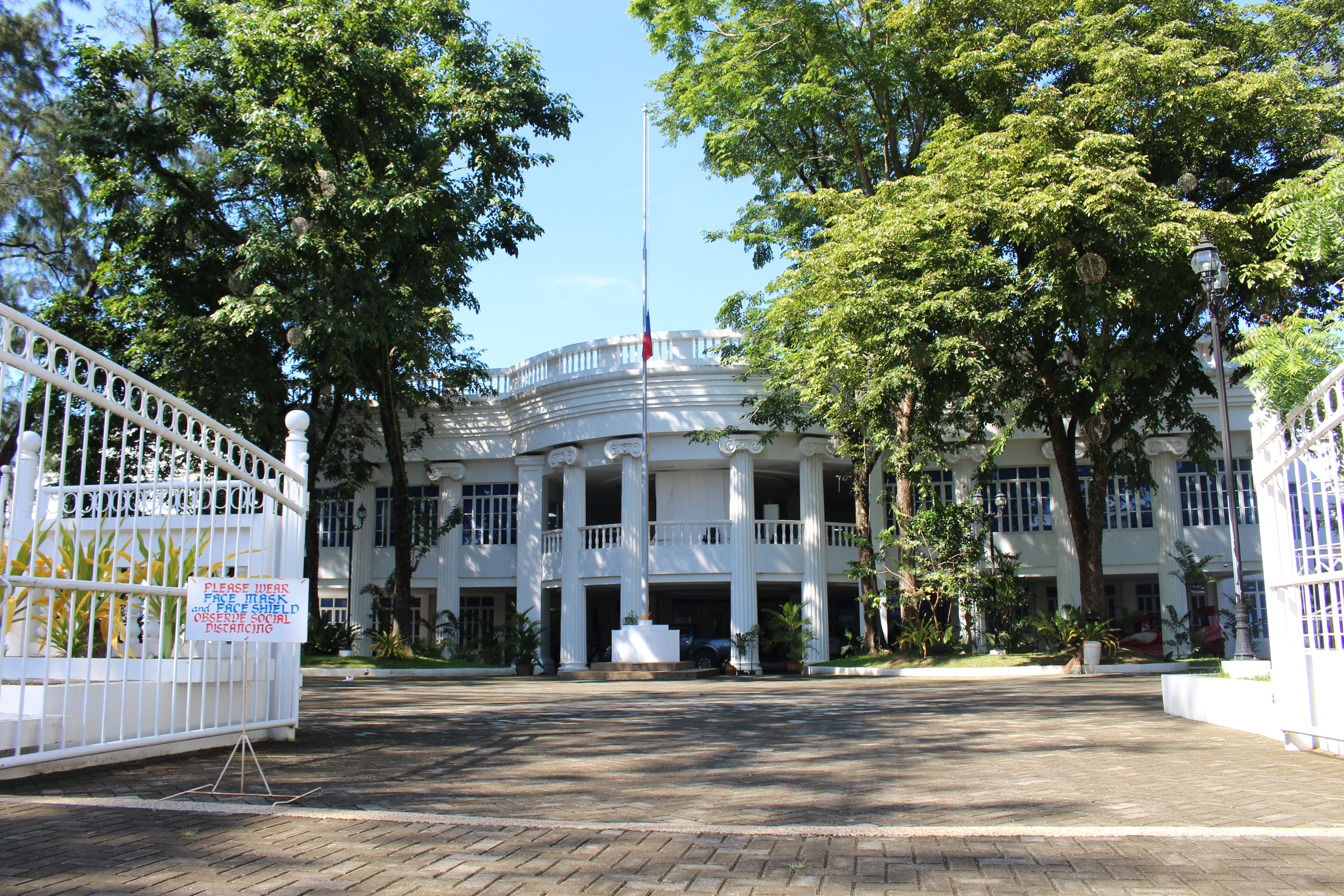
The Zamboanga del Norte Provincial Capitol in Dipolog in 2021

Certain portions of Dipolog were organized into separate municipalities of Polanco and New Piñan, by virtue of Executive Order No. 467 signed by President Elpidio Quirino on August 22, 1951.

On June 6, 1952, Zamboanga province is separated into two provinces of Zamboanga del Norte and Zamboanga del Sur through Republic Act (RA) No. 711. Dipolog became the capital of Zamboanga del Norte upon creation.

On June 21, 1969, through the effort of former congressman Alberto Ubay, President Ferdinand Marcos signed into law RA No. 5520, making Dipolog a chartered city effective January 1, 1970. The date is both significant and historic as that coincided with the Apollo 11 launching which carried the first men to the moon on June 21, 1969. Mayor Felicisimo Herrera was made the last Municipal Mayor (1963–1970) and the first City Mayor of Dipolog (1970–1978). On March 8, 1982, the Sangguniang Panlungsod adopted the Dipolog City March composed by Mrs. Antonina O. Romano as the city's official song.

=== Martial law era ===
Dipolog was the site of at least one major assassination during the Marcos Martial law era - the gunning down of Human Rights lawyers Jacobo Amatong and Zorro Aguilar by two soldiers of the Marcos government, who were never caught. Both lawyers have since been honored by having their names included in at least two streets in the city, inscribed on the wall of remembrance at the Philippines’ Bantayog ng mga Bayani, which honors the heroes and martyrs who fought against Ferdinand Marcos and his martial law regime.

== Geography ==
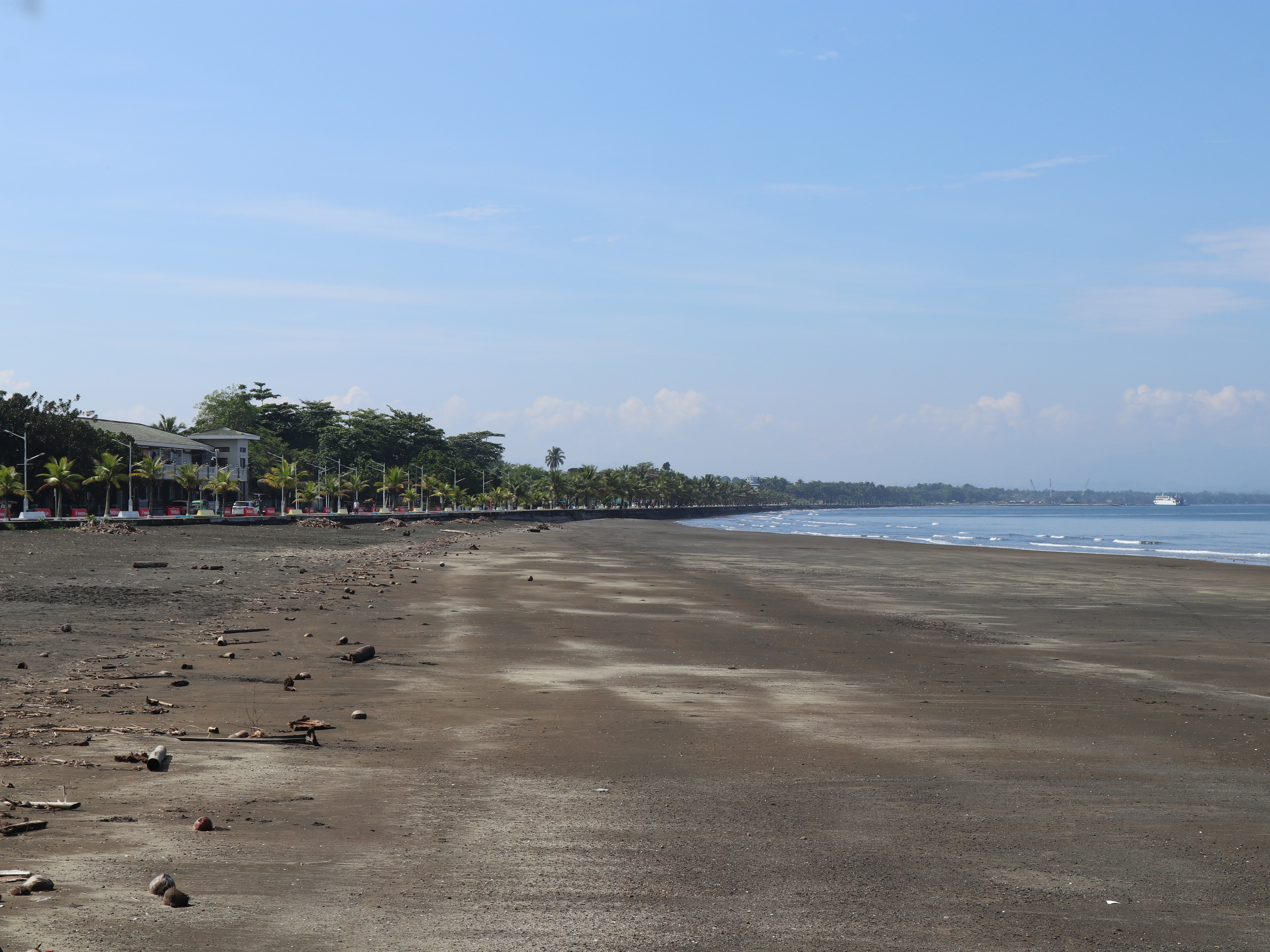
Dipolog Boulevard beach

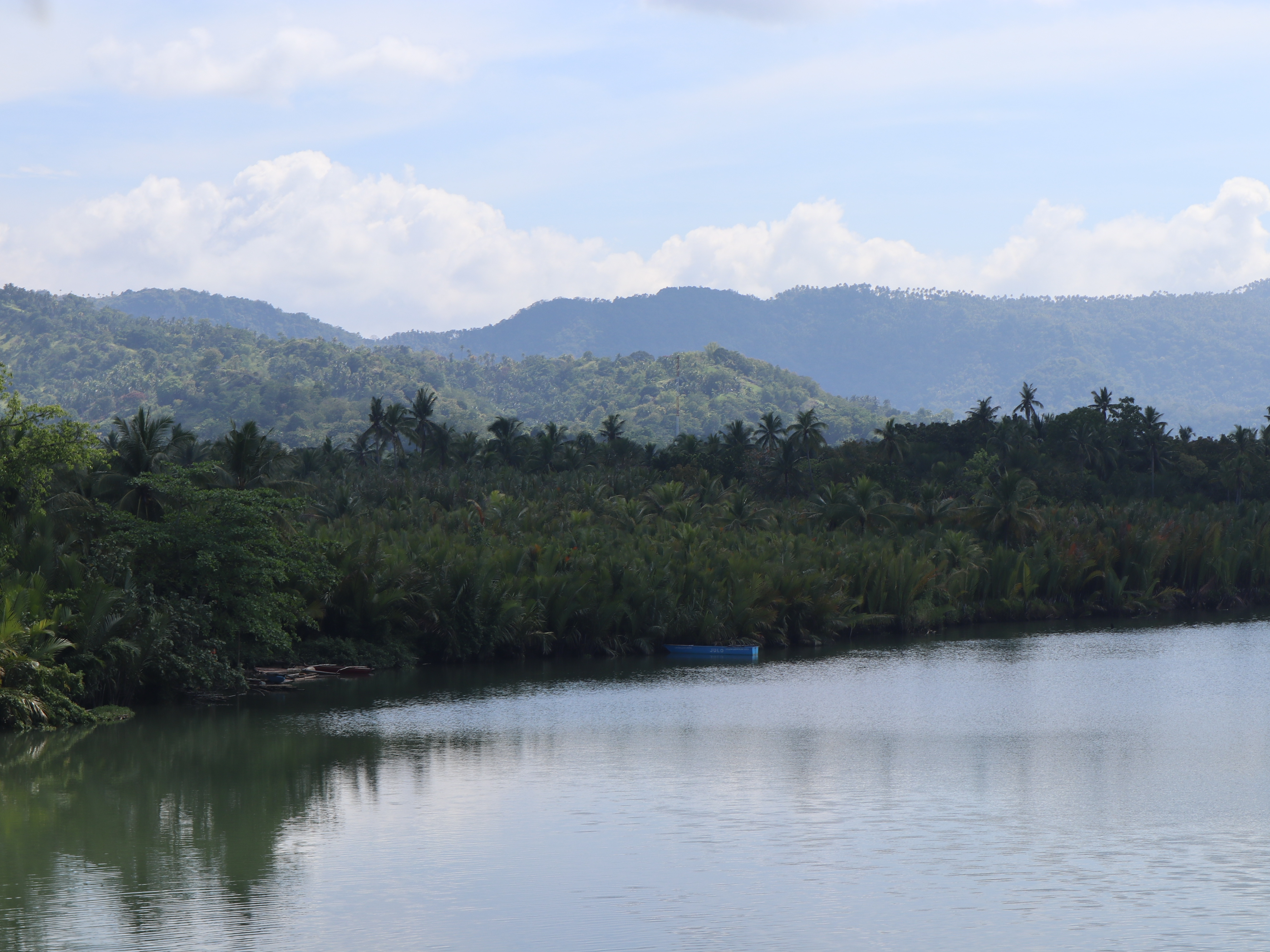
Dipolog River forest

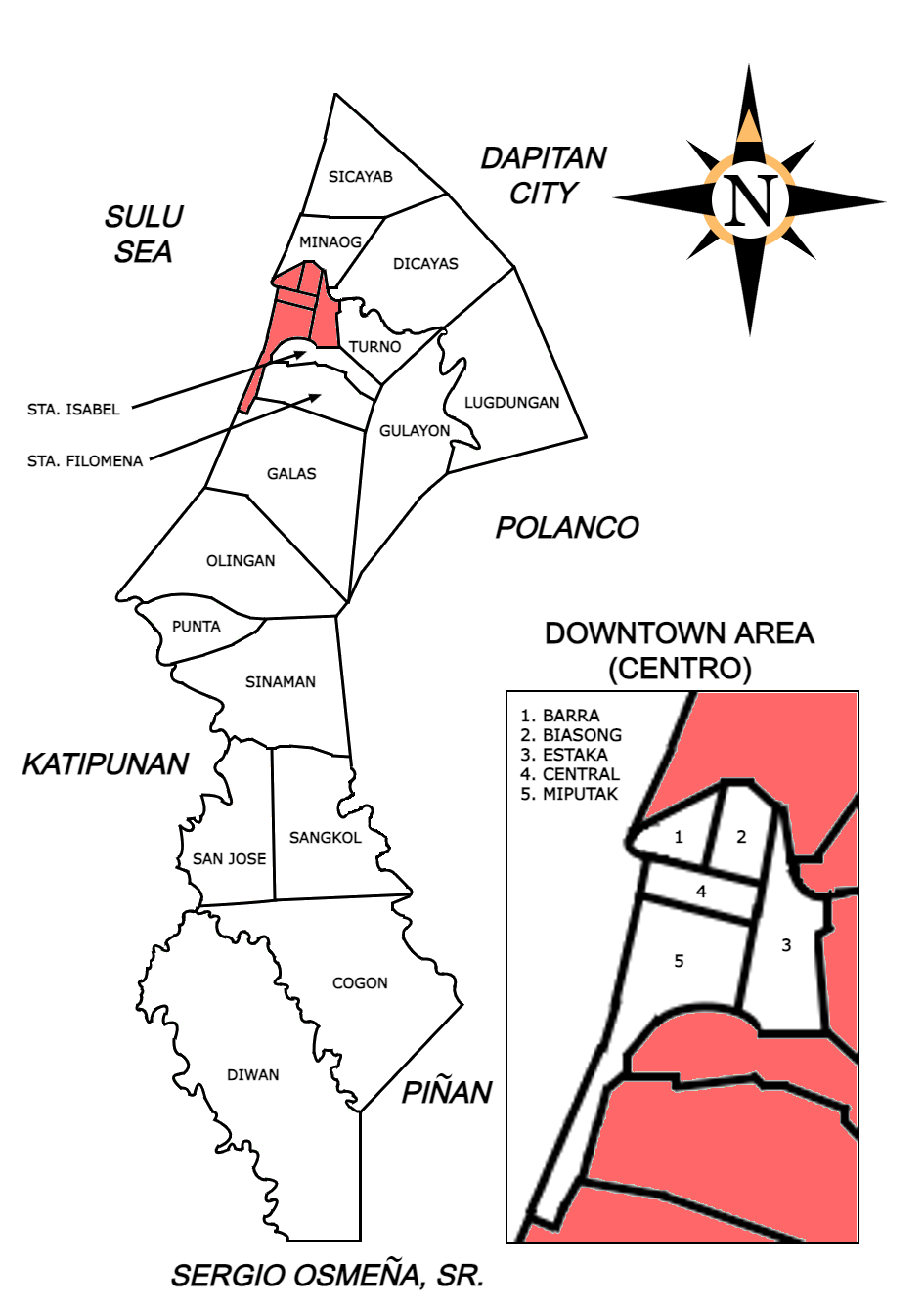
Map of Dipolog with barangay partitions.

Dipolog is known to be the "Gateway to Western Mindanao" as it is situated in the Northwestern part of the Province of Zamboanga del Norte. It is bounded on the north by Dapitan, on the east by the Municipalities of Polanco and Piñan, on the south by the Municipality of Sergio Osmeña Sr. and on the west by the Municipality of Katipunan.

Its land area in 1914 covered an approximate land area of 248,587 hectares under Act No. 302 of the Philippine Islands. It was substantially reduced in 1951 to the current 13,628 hectares, after two barrios of Dipolog were converted into Municipalities of Polanco, and Piñan under Executive Order of the President No. 467, dated August 22, 1951.

=== Barangays ===
Dipolog is politically subdivided into 21 barangays. Each barangay consists of puroks while some have sitios.

Barangays of Dipolog
Administration			Population			
Barangay	Class	Barangay Captain	PSGC	2024	2020	4 year change
Barra	Urban (Poblacion)	Moman P. Apura	097202011	3,622	3,331	+8.74%
Biasong	Urban (Poblacion)	Jose Moreno B. Narvaez	097202010	2,397	3,128	−23.37%
Central	Urban (Poblacion)	Rosanna R. Diaz	097202012	1,080	1,735	−37.75%
Cogon	Rural	Paquito L. Paño	097202001	2,319	1,982	+17.00%
Dicayas	Urban	Danilo C. Jebone	097202002	10,297	9,974	+3.24%
Diwan	Rural	Rosebeth B. Turno	097202003	3,925	3,549	+10.59%
Estaka (Estaca) (Note: The official website of the City of Dipolog spells the barangay's name as "Estaka", while the Philippine Statistics Authority spells the name as "Estaca.")	Urban (Poblacion)	Irvin A. Banga	097202009	5,982	7,806	−23.37%
Galas	Urban	Angelito G. Nob	097202004	19,582	19,508	+0.38%
Gulayon	Urban	Mary Jane V. Cuenca	097202005	7,833	7,896	−0.80%
Lugdungan	Rural	Paterno L. Laclac, Jr.	097202006	2,705	2,533	+6.79%
Minaog	Urban	Jonathan L. Pelegrino	097202007	9,797	9,402	+4.20%
Miputak	Urban (Poblacion)	Raymund G. Yu	097202013	5,902	7,667	−23.02%
Olingan	Urban	Francisca L. Maquiling	097202008	16,042	15,258	+5.14%
Punta	Rural	Joel L. Recentes	097202014	3,182	3,134	+1.53%
San Jose	Rural	Alinohenes T. Landiza	097202015	943	1,009	−6.54%
Sangkol	Rural	Rogelio D. Regañon	097202016	2,065	2,073	−0.39%
Santa Filomena	Urban	Marlon B. Mejares	097202017	8,904	8,475	+5.06%
Santa Isabel	Urban	Harry A. Robles	097202021	7,877	7,777	+1.29%
Sicayab	Urban	Joe Chris L. Empal	097202018	8,394	8,927	−5.97%
Sinaman	Rural	Nora S. Dalmacio	097202019	2,457	1,982	+23.97%
Turno	Urban	Ramonito G. Barbaso, Jr.	097202020	11,223	10,995	+2.07%
City of Dipolog			097202000	136,528	138,141	−1.17%
Source: Philippine Statistics Authority – Philippine Standard Geographic Code – City of Dipolog – Barangays

=== Climate ===
Climate data for Dipolog (1991–2020, extremes 1949–2023)
Month	Jan	Feb	Mar	Apr	May	Jun	Jul	Aug	Sep	Oct	Nov	Dec	Year
Record high °C (°F)	35.7 (96.3)	35.2 (95.4)	35.6 (96.1)	36.7 (98.1)	37.5 (99.5)	37.2 (99.0)	36.7 (98.1)	36.8 (98.2)	37.0 (98.6)	36.2 (97.2)	36.2 (97.2)	35.6 (96.1)	37.2 (99.0)
Mean daily maximum °C (°F)	30.3 (86.5)	30.7 (87.3)	31.6 (88.9)	32.6 (90.7)	32.6 (90.7)	32.0 (89.6)	31.8 (89.2)	32.0 (89.6)	32.0 (89.6)	31.8 (89.2)	31.3 (88.3)	30.9 (87.6)	31.6 (88.9)
Daily mean °C (°F)	26.7 (80.1)	26.8 (80.2)	27.4 (81.3)	28.1 (82.6)	28.1 (82.6)	27.6 (81.7)	27.0 (80.6)	27.6 (81.7)	27.5 (81.5)	27.4 (81.3)	27.2 (81.0)	27.0 (80.6)	27.4 (81.3)
Mean daily minimum °C (°F)	23.0 (73.4)	23.0 (73.4)	23.2 (73.8)	23.7 (74.7)	23.6 (74.5)	23.2 (73.8)	22.1 (71.8)	23.1 (73.6)	23.0 (73.4)	23.1 (73.6)	23.1 (73.6)	23.2 (73.8)	23.1 (73.6)
Record low °C (°F)	18.4 (65.1)	18.0 (64.4)	17.0 (62.6)	17.3 (63.1)	19.0 (66.2)	18.5 (65.3)	18.5 (65.3)	18.0 (64.4)	18.6 (65.5)	18.5 (65.3)	19.0 (66.2)	17.4 (63.3)	17.0 (62.6)
Average rainfall mm (inches)	170.1 (6.70)	135.8 (5.35)	103.9 (4.09)	103.5 (4.07)	169.2 (6.66)	251.9 (9.92)	225.5 (8.88)	194.9 (7.67)	182.4 (7.18)	301.2 (11.86)	365.5 (14.39)	280.3 (11.04)	2,484.2 (97.80)
Average rainy days (≥ 1.0 mm)	15	10	9	7	11	16	15	13	14	17	18	17	162
Average relative humidity (%)	87	85	83	82	84	85	86	85	85	86	86	86	85
Source: PAGASA

Dipolog has a tropical rainforest climate, according to the Köppen Climate classification with ample rain distributed quite evenly throughout the year and warm to hot temperatures. The city experiences a wetter period from June to December, with June, October and November being especially wet.

== Demographics ==
Population census of Dipolog

Year	Pop.	±% p.a.
1903	5,204	—
1918	15,982	+7.77%
1939	31,604	+3.30%
1948	40,618	+2.83%
1960	32,236	−1.91%
1970	46,368	+3.70%
1975	48,403	+0.87%
1980	61,919	+5.05%

Year	Pop.	±% p.a.
1990	79,887	+2.58%
1995	90,777	+2.42%
2000	99,862	+2.07%
2007	113,118	+1.73%
2010	120,460	+2.31%
2015	130,759	+1.57%
2020	138,141	+1.16%
2024	136,528	−0.28%

Source: Philippine Statistics Authority

According to the 2020 census, Dipolog has a population of 138,141 inhabitants.

=== Language ===
Dipolog is predominantly a Cebuano-speaking city, particularly a standard variant commonly used in Northern Mindanao. The language is locally known as simply Bisaya or Binisaya, and is spoken by more than 90% of the total city population.

=== Religion ===
Most inhabitants are Roman Catholics, having been the seat of the Roman Catholic Diocese of Dipolog since its inception in 1967. Like many western Mindanao cities and towns, there is a significant portion of Muslims in the city. Other religious groups represented include the Iglesia Filipina Independiente (Aglipayans), the United Church of Christ in the Philippines (Protestants), Iglesia ni Cristo, The Church of Jesus Christ of Latter-day Saints (Mormons), Jehovah's Witness, Seventh-day Adventist Church (Adventists), and some local Baptists churches among others.

== Economy ==
Poverty incidence of Dipolog (%)

Source: Philippine Statistics Authority

Dipolog fish market

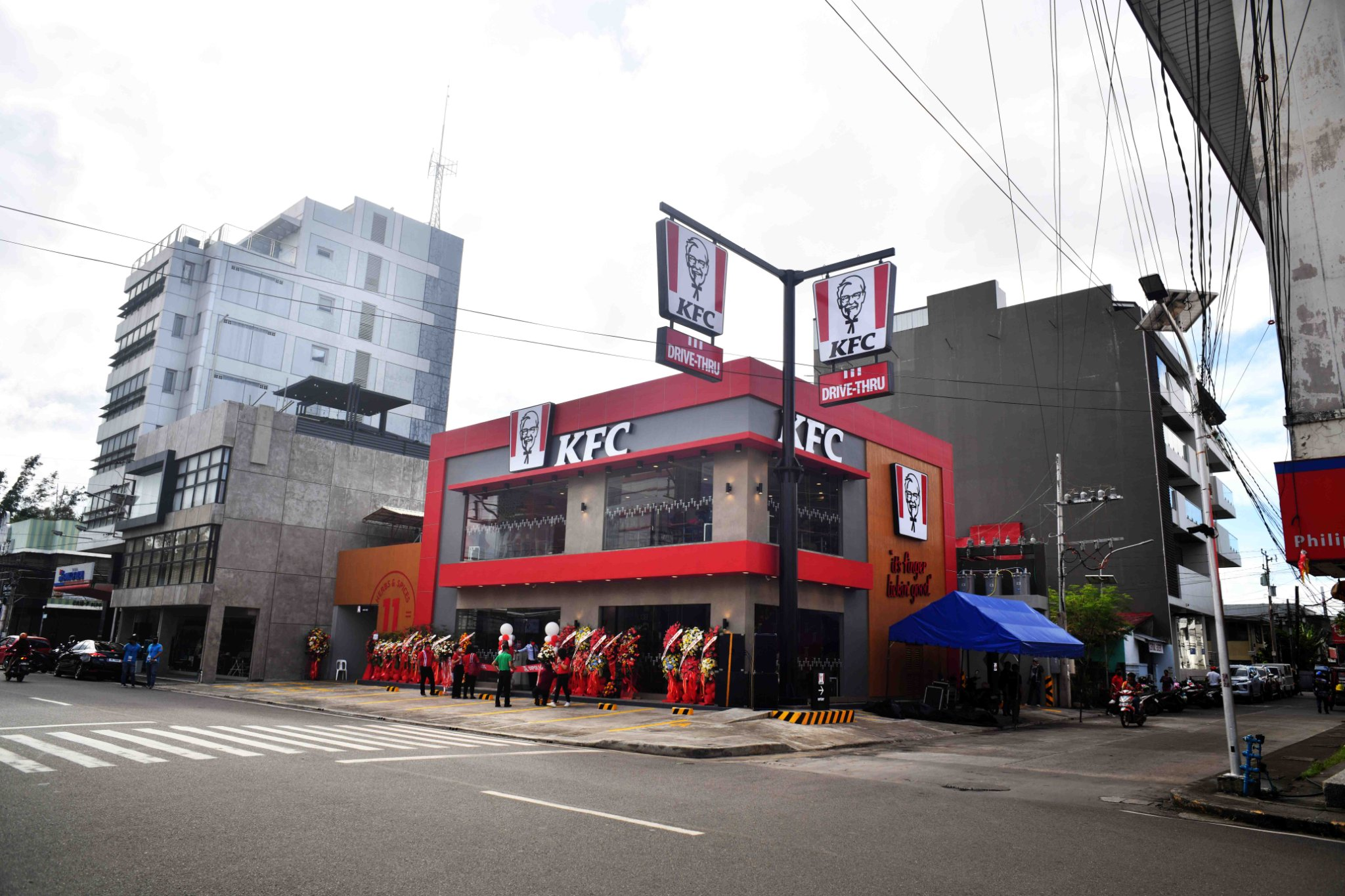
KFC Dipolog, 2022

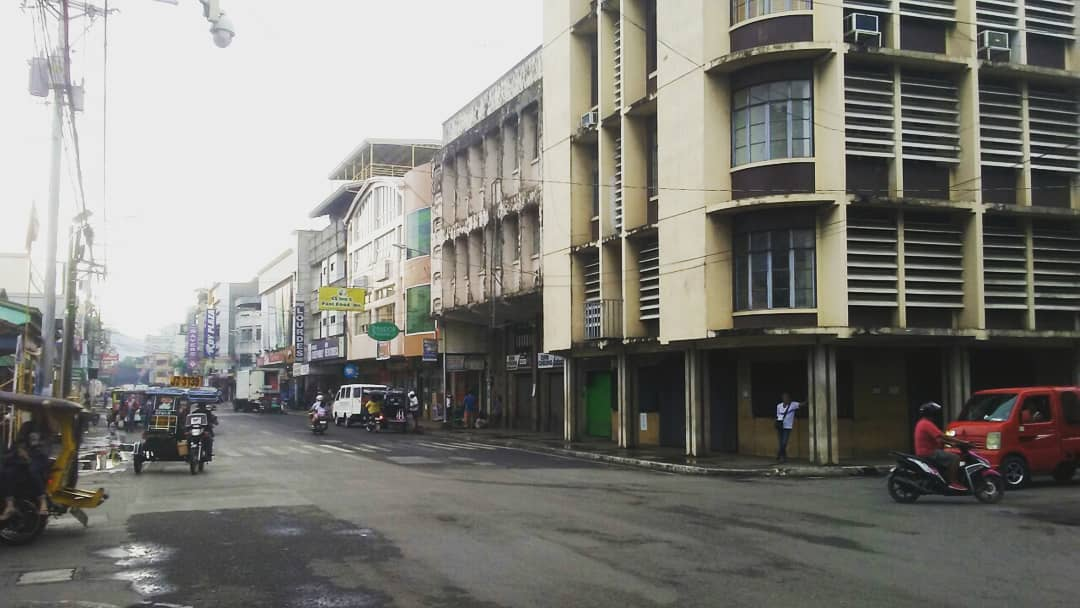
Rizal Avenue in Downtown Dipolog, 2019

The city is now one of the major options for local investors from Cebu, Dumaguete, Cagayan de Oro and Davao and for foreign nationalities from India and China investing in retail, tourism, services, manufacturing, trade, and wholesale. It is also abundant with natural resources in terms of agriculture with fishpond areas and fishing grounds; fish production with approximately 56 fish species being produced, as well as livestock production such as carabao, cattle, horse, goat and pig.

Potential investment areas range from agri-based processing such as activated charcoal, desiccated coconut, broiler contract growing, livestock raising, cattle fattening; construction, furniture, marble, low-cost housing projects, feed mill; food processing or packaging such as meat and fish processing, mango processing and packaging.

=== Industry ===
Dipolog is best known for its bottled sardines production. Apart from sardines, industries in Dipolog include DN Yubros Steel Corporation, a member of DN Steel Group of Companies through DN Joint Ventures.

== Government ==
Old seal of the city, NHCP version

Dipolog's seat of government, the City Hall, is located on Rizal Avenue in Barangay Central. The local government structure is composed of one mayor, one vice mayor and ten councilors all elected through popular vote. Two ex officio members are added to the City Council with one representing Dipolog's 21 Barangay Captains being the Association of Barangay Captains (ABC) President, and one representing Dipolog's 21 Barangay Youth Council Presidents being the Sangunniang Kabataan (SK) Federation President. Each official, with the exemption of the ABC and SK Presidents, is elected publicly to a 3-year term and can be re-elected up to 3 terms in succession. The day-to-day administration of the city is handled by the city administrator.

=== Heraldry ===
The official seal of Dipolog is the symbol of the city's identity when it became a city after Republic Act No. 5520, signed on June 21, 1969, was enacted on January 1, 1970.

The city's emblem stands for the following physical attributes and character:

- Stars - The current number of barangays comprising the city.
- Major agricultural products in the city: fish (upper central corner), rice/corn crop (lower left corner), and coconut tree (lower right corner).
- The space rocket - a symbol as the signing of the city charter coincided with the Apollo 11 launching
- Year 1970 - The year Dipolog was inaugurated in to a city.

== Culture ==
Dipolog shared much of its cultural history with the ancient town of Dapitan to which it once belonged. It traces its beginnings long before the Spanish conquistadores set foot on the island of Mindanao. Dipolog was previously known as Tulwanan, in native language, literally meaning a settlement by the river. Its earliest settlers all belonged to the Subanen Tribe called Subanon or river people with established religion founded in animism. These descended from the Austronesian peoples who roamed Mindanao and Southeast Asia via land bridges as early as 30,000 years ago Later migrations of other tribes were made by water and took place over several thousand years.

== Tourism ==
=== Attractions ===
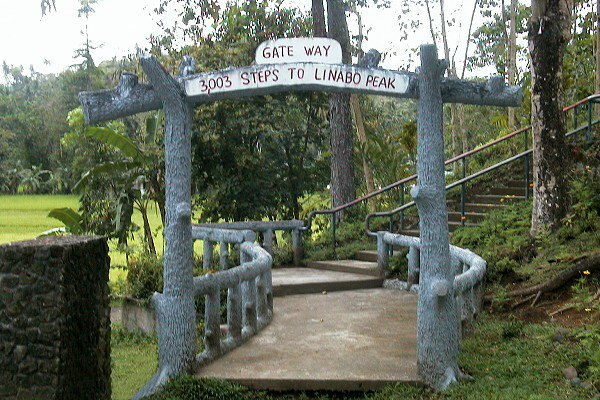
Entrance to the 3,003 Steps to Linabo Peak

Sungkilaw Falls

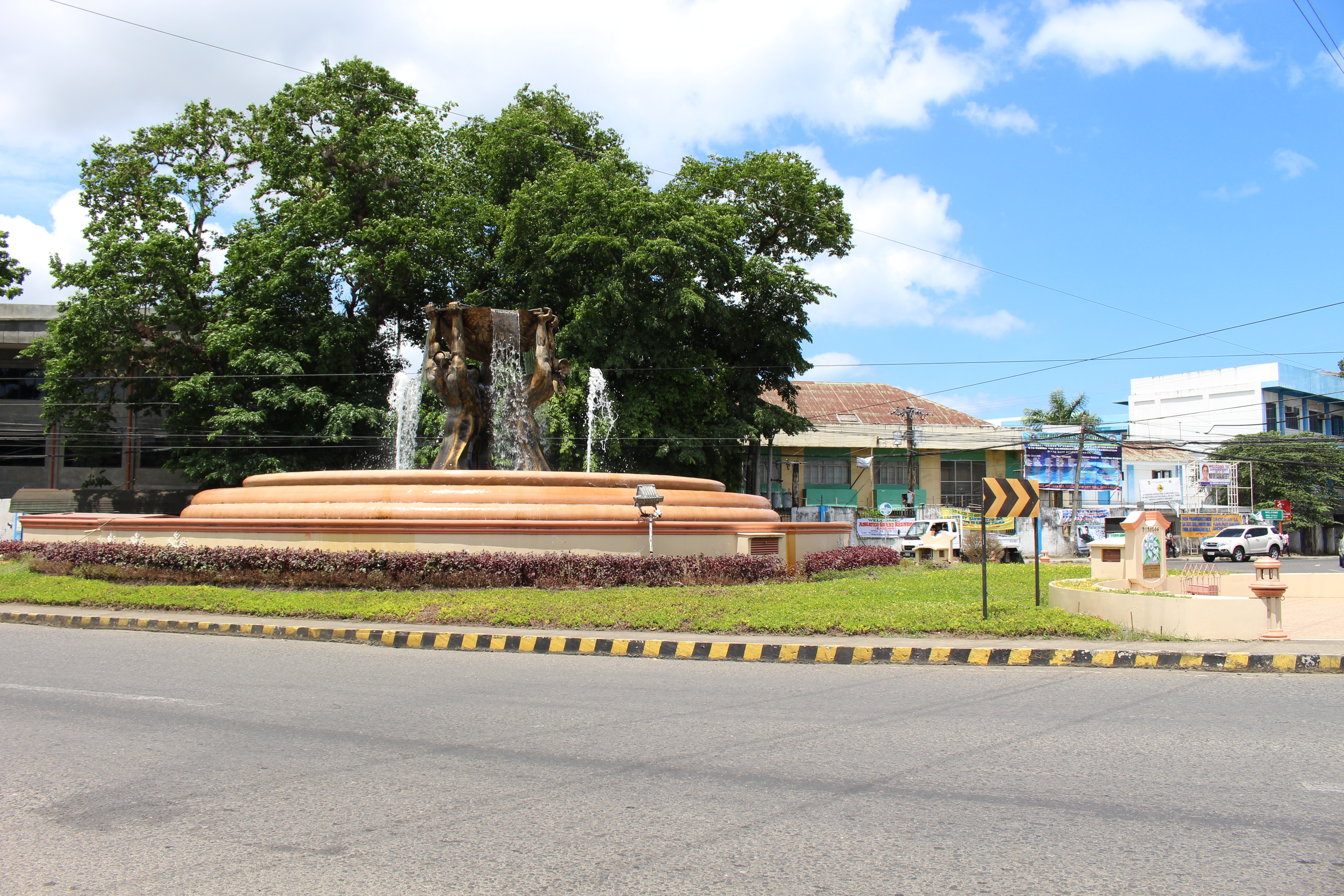
P'gsalabuk Circle Rotonda

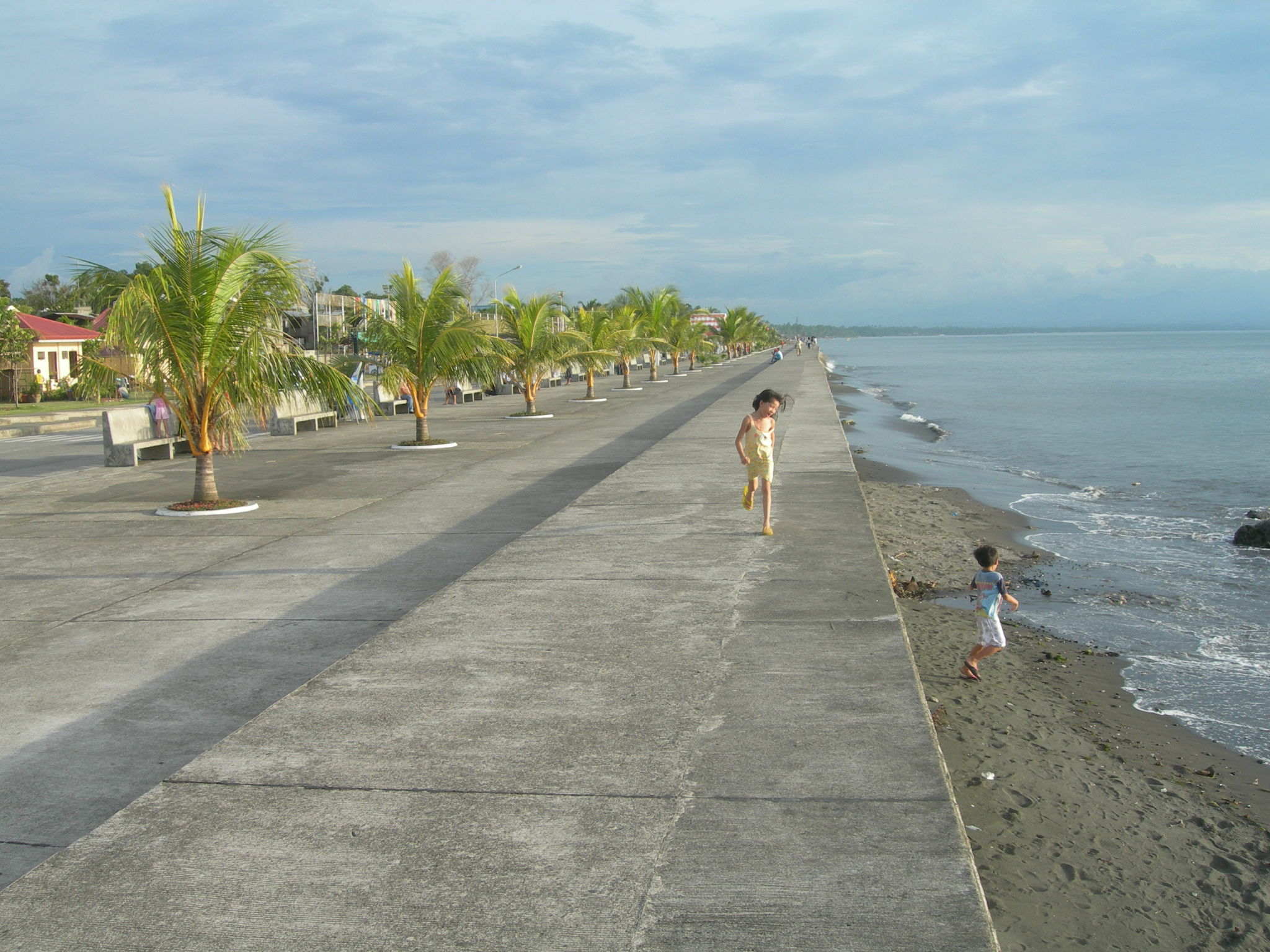
Esplanade of Dipolog Boulevard

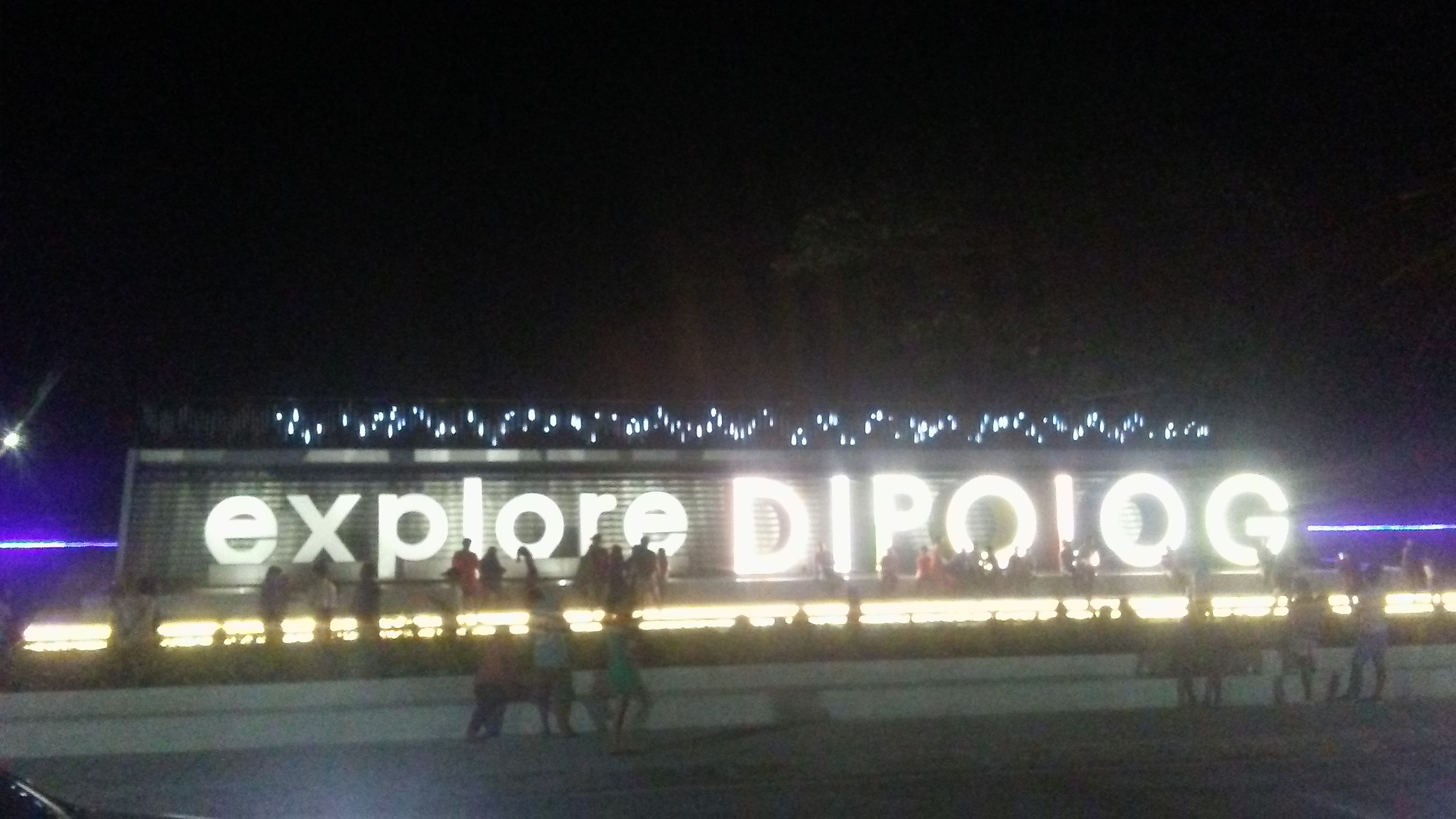
Explore Dipolog landmark in Dipolog Boulevard

- Linabo Peak - The 3003 Steps to Linabo Peak offers a panoramic view of the twin cities of Dipolog and Dapitan. It is also the venue for the annual “Katkat Sakripisyo” of Catholic devotees who perform their penitential rites during the Lenten Season.
- Cogon Eco-Tourism Park - The Cogon Eco-Tourism Park is a 344-hectare reforestation area situated in Barangay Cogon established in 1958. Mature trees are growing wild in the area; species such as Mahogany, Teak, Yemane, Lumbayao, Molave, Acacia, Narra, Mayapis, Lauan, Narig, Tianong, Duguan, Lumbayao, Rattan and Nato. It is also one of the favorite camping sites of different mountaineering groups. Presently, under development in the area are the construction of Information Center, Subanen Valley, Picnic cottages, well landscaped ground at the entrance, parking area, aviary, and different cages for animals. Adjacent to Barangay Cogon is Barangay Diwan, part of the eco-tourism complex housing the Organization of International Spiritual and Cultural Advancement or OISCA Forest Park, a joint project of the OISCA of Japan, locally managed by Hiroshi Ikeda, and the City Government of Dipolog. It also houses the Dipolog OISCA Children's Forest Park. The most prominent feature of the park is the Sungkilaw Falls.
- Casa Bernedo - a century-old house owned by the Filipino-Spanish Bernedo family, for tourists. On July 1, 2012, Casa Bernedo is developed as Dipolog's Center for Culture and the Arts in time for Dipolog's 100th Centennial Anniversary on July 1, 2013, and currently houses the Dipolog Tourism Office. The ground floor serves as a venue for visual arts and photography exhibits.
- ONAY Museum - This is where the collection of nameplates, medals, pictures and other memorabilia of General Alexander Yano, the 38th Chief-of-Staff of the Armed Forces of the Philippines, and the first Mindanao-born general, is located. The name "ONAY" came from his last name in reverse.
- Santa Cruz - The tall cross stands at Punta Corro, the spot where migrating Boholanos landed and to establish a settlement. The cross was erected by the settlers on Roodmas, May 3, 1905, in thanksgiving for their safe journey. Mass was once said at the spot before the Spaniards established a chapel 1.5 kilometers inland along the town's center street (now Rizal Avenue). The town cathedral was later built in 1894 to replace the old church. Dr. José Rizal designed the high altar from a sketch requested by his former professor and former curé of Dipolog, Fr. José Villaclara.
- Dipolog City Hall - Completed on July 1, 1913, under the administration of General John J. Pershing as Governor of the Department of Mindanao and Sulu. The original design of the town wall was the exact replica of the town hall of Maribojoc, Bohol, which was designed by the Americans. The original hall was exactly the same size that of Maribojoc's down to the size of the jail. But today the hall was expanded and its original design can not be seen anymore. It is located near the Our Lady of the Most Holy Rosary Cathedral and the Plaza Magsaysay. The hall building was constructed under the administration of Mayor Fermin D. Kagatan. The corner street houses the Monument of Three Prominent Dipolognons namely:
  - Pascual Tan Martinez, the first appointed Mayor of Dipolog in 1913–1918;
  - Rev. Fr. Nicasio Yebes Patangan, the first Filipino Diocesan Priest of Mindanao; and
  - Eugenio Redulla Margate, a farmer for 25 years who introduced the Margate System of Planting Rice.
- P'gsalabuk Circle - Located at Estaka-Turno road junction is the "Fountain of Blessings". P'gsalabuk is a Subanen (Lumad) term which means "togetherness". The statues represent the tri-people of Mindanao: the Subanen, Muslims, and Christians, which symbolize the diverse cultures prevailing in Dipolog. The bowl raised to heavens is a gesture of thanksgiving and offering to God Almighty for the generous outpouring of graces and blessings, bountiful harvests and sustained peace and prosperity.
- Dipolog Boulevard - known as the Foreshore Development and Wellness Center, it is an esplanade in Dipolog. It is a future-proof esplanade which involves the development of 1.6 kilometers stretch of foreshore area spanning from Santa Cruz of Barangay Central to Purok Bularan of Barangay Miputak, and will soon reach the future Dipolog City Port Area (formerly Galas Feeder Port) in Barangay Galas. Equipped with adequate facilities like basketball courts and playground park, the city's boulevard serves as a tourist destination for every young and old to enjoy. It is also the site of the annual "Pagsalabuk Festival", motor company trade shows, and sporting events like marathons, triathlons, and dragon boat racing as part of the DIPOLOG SPORTS CITY 2020 vision. Extension is currently underway to extend the boulevard for another kilometer reaching the seaport of Galas making it a total of 2.6 kilometers. When completed, it is expected to contribute in the expansion of commercial activities and protection of coastal areas of the city against large sea waves during typhoon periods.
  - Boulevard Commercial Complex - a two-building structure which is a host to prospective locators who wish to do business in the area, augmenting the presently existing restaurants, bars, and several food and beverage peddlers.
  - Explore Dipolog Landmark - features the slogan of the same line. It is now open and it is near the Dipolog Watchtower.

=== Festivals ===
- Sinulog sa Dipolog Festival, every 3rd Saturday of January featuring pageantry and street dancing for the Santo Niño,
- Katkat Sakripisyo at Linabo Peak every Lenten Season
- P'gsalabuk Festival in May with harvest rituals of the Tri-people of Mindanao (Subanens, Muslims & Christians) -- a celebration of unity amidst diversity,
  - Feast of St. Vincent Ferrer on 3rd Saturday of May,
- Adlaw sa Dipolog (Dipolog's Founding Anniversary) marked July 1 to 6 with sports, cultural, and beauty pageants highlighted with Mutya sa Dipolog,
- Dahunog sa Dipolog on October 7 which is the Feast of the Lady of the Holy Rosary
- Pasko sa Dipolog (PASADI) showcases nightly shows by Dipolog's respective 21 barangays in the month of December.
- Dipolog Film Festival is an annual competition which exhibits short films made and shot by Dipolognons.

== Transportation ==
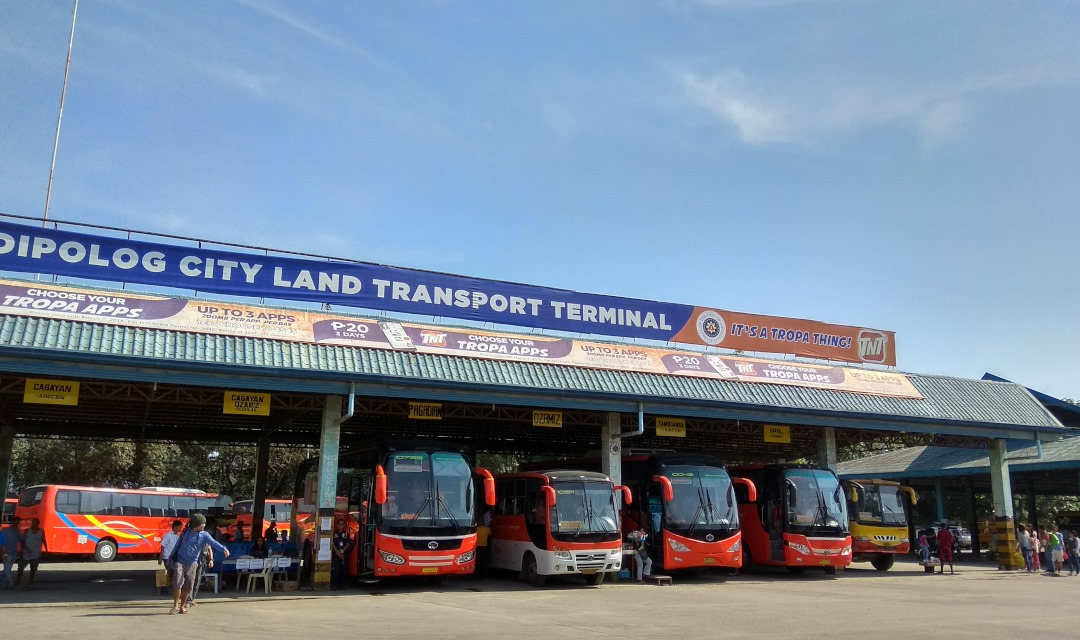
Dipolog City Land Transport Terminal

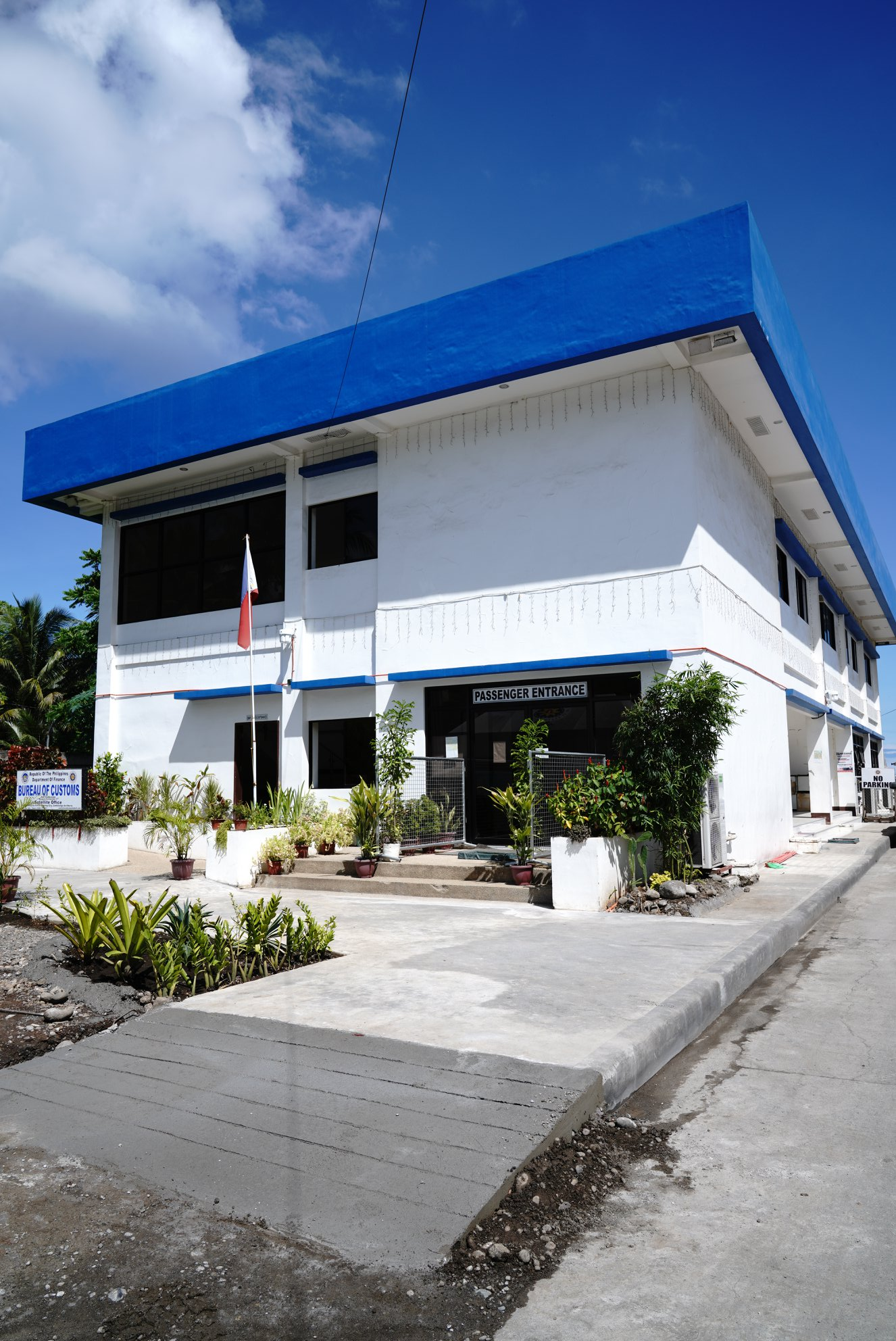
Port of Dipolog Terminal

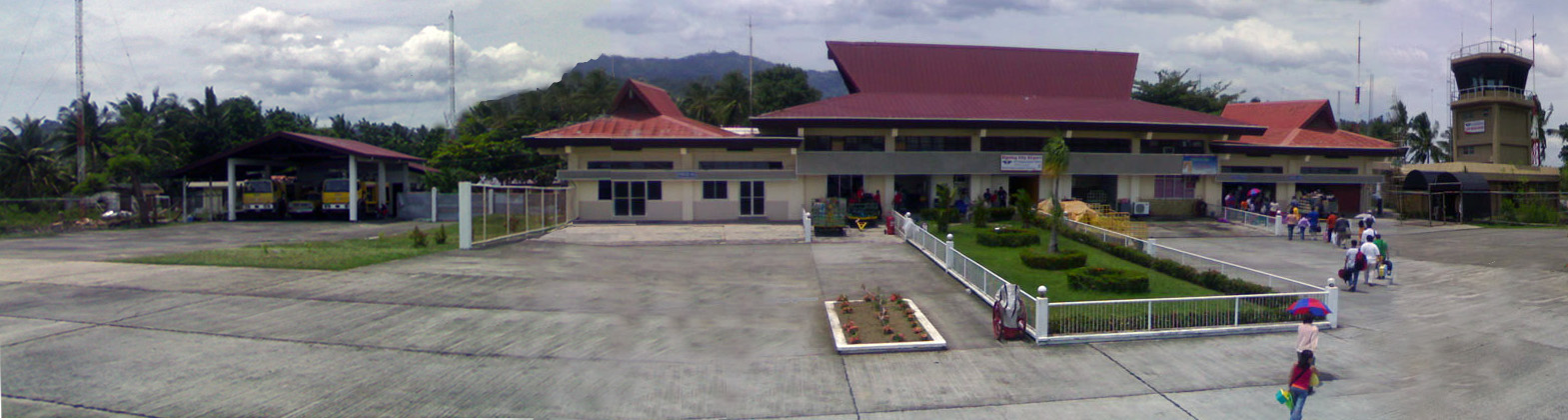
Dipolog Airport

Tricycles (locally called motorcab), sikads (bicycle-powered tricycles), and habal-habals are the primary modes of transportation within the city.

=== By Land ===
Most intercity transport is done by motorized tricycle, pedicab or trisikad, or simple motorcycles known locally as habal-habal.

Dipolog has its own bus terminal in Barangay Miputak. It provides daily trip to any places in Zamboanga del Norte, Zamboanga del Sur, Zamboanga Sibugay, Misamis Occidental, and cities like Zamboanga City, Cagayan de Oro, Quezon City, Bacolod, Cebu City, and General Santos City. Some intra-provincial and most interprovincial transportation rely on Rural Transit, Super Five Transport, UV Express, and other public utility jeeps are predominantly used; whereas, Ceres Transport is being used for inter-island transportation.

=== By Water ===
Dipolog relies on the nearby Port of Pulauan in Dapitan, especially for trips bound to Dumaguete, Cebu City, and Manila.

The city can now reach Municipality of Oslob, Cebu through Lite Shipping Corporation via Pulauan Port, while dredging is undergoing in Galas Port (officially Dipolog City Port) in Barangay Galas by the City Government of Dipolog. The city also has daily direct trips to Cebu from Dipolog through the Cebu-based Medallion Transport Inc. Docking port is at the Dipolog City Port in Barangay Galas. Dipolog to Cebu City, which Medallion had plied since March 2015, has trips everyday except Saturday at 7:00pm. While Cebu City to Dipolog has everyday trips at 8:30pm using M/V Lady of Joy and M/V Lady of Good Voyage. Meanwhile, Dipolog to Dumaguete, which they had plied since 2018, has trips every day at 11:00am and Dumaguete to Dipolog has everyday trips at 5:00pm using M/V Lady of Perpetual Help.

=== By Air ===
Dipolog Airport (IATA: DPL, ICAO: RPMG) is the city's domestic airport located in Barangay Minaog. Daily itinerary trips from and to Manila, and from Cebu through Philippine Airlines and Cebu Pacific.

== Healthcare ==
Dipolog has four major hospitals, namely the Corazon C. Aquino Hospital in Biasong, Ospital ng Kabataan ng Dipolog in Estaka, Zamboanga del Norte Service Cooperative Hospital in Turno, and the Zamboanga del Norte Medical Center in Sicayab.

ACE (Allied Care Experts) Medical Center Dipolog in Olingan has recently opened in 2024.

== Education ==
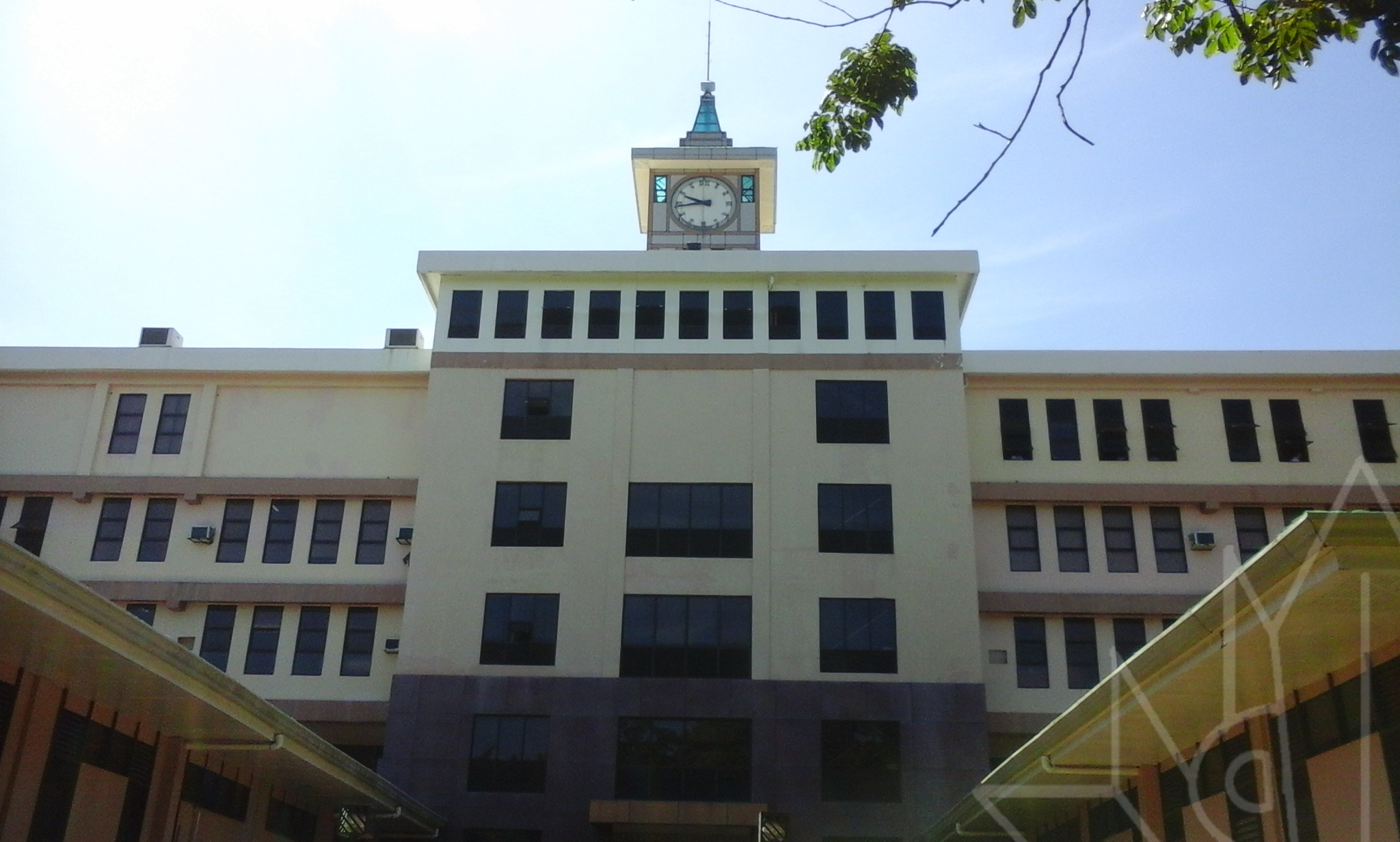
Andres Bonifacio College

The City of Dipolog has one state university and three private colleges specialized in Engineering and Information Technology, Health Services, Business and Administration, Primary and Secondary Education, and Arts and Social Sciences.

Jose Rizal Memorial State University - Dipolog Campus

The Jose Rizal Memorial State University - Dipolog (JRMSU Dipolog), originally formed as the Zamboanga del Norte School of Arts and Trade (ZNSAT) in 1961, is one of the five campuses under the Jose Rizal Memorial State University System in Zamboanga del Norte.

Colleges

- Saint Vincent's College, Inc. (SVC) is known as one of the oldest schools in Dipolog, founded in 1917 by the Jesuits who came to Dipolog.
- Andres Bonifacio College (ABCollege) is a private, non-sectarian college founded in 1940 by the late Amando B. Amatong. In 2020, it achieved a 100% passing rate of its nursing graduates in the Nursing Licensure Examinations. The institution has also produced many topnotchers and rankers in multiple board exams, including in the Philippine Bar Examination.
- Dipolog Medical Center College Foundation (DMC) is a private, sectarian paramedical institution supervised by the De La Salle Supervised Schools System.
- Other notable colleges and technical schools are Dipolog City Institute of Technology (DCIT) in Barangay Minaog, Dipolog Computer Systems, Inc. (DCSI) in Barangay Turno, Dipolog School of Fisheries (DSF) in Barangay Olingan, and Livelihood Skills Development and Enhancement Center (LSDEC) in Barangay Galas. STI College Dipolog in Barangay Miputak, opened in 2001, ceased operations in 2020.

Philippine Science High School

The Philippine Science High School Zamboanga Peninsula Region Campus (PSHS-ZRC) is the 16th campus of the Philippine Science High School System. The campus is located at Barangay Cogon in Dipolog.

== Media ==
=== AM Stations ===
- DXDR RMN Dipolog 981 (Radio Mindanao Network)
- RPN DXKD Radyo Ronda 1053 Dipolog (Radio Philippines Network)

=== FM Stations ===
- 88.1 Jack FM Dipolog (Subic Broadcasting Corporation)
- 88.9 First Love Radio (First Love Broadcasting Network)
- 89.7 Radyo Kidlat Dipolog (Philippine Broadcasting Service/Zamboanga del Norte Electric Cooperative)
- 90.9 Magik FM Dipolog (Century Broadcasting Network)
- 91.7 Radyo Rapido (Kalayaan Broadcasting System)
- DXAA 92.5 (Andres Bonifacio College Broadcasting System)
- 93.3 Star FM Dipolog (Bombo Radyo Philippines)
- 95.9 Radyo Bisdak Dipolog (Times Broadcasting Network Corporation)
- 97.5 Juander Radyo Dipolog (Capitol Broadcasting Center/RSV Broadcasting Services)
- 98.1 Infinite Radio Dipolog (St. Jude Thaddeus Institute of Technology)
- 100.5 Radyo Natin Dipolog (Manila Broadcasting Company/Radyo Natin Network)
- 103.7 Energy FM Dipolog (Ultrasonic Broadcasting System)
- 104.5 Radyo Sincero Dipolog (ABJ Radio Broadcasting, Inc.)
- 106.1 FMR Babe Radio Dipolog (Philippine Collective Media Corporation)
- 107.7 Brigada News FM Dipolog (Brigada Mass Media Corporation)

=== TV Stations ===
- GMA TV-4 Dipolog
- GTV Channel 26 Dipolog

=== Cable Providers ===
- Orient Cable TV
- Dipolog Cable TV Network
- Cignal TV
- G Sat

== Notable personalities ==
The following are the people who were either born in, lived in, and/or are current residents of the city of Dipolog.

Politics and government

- Matias Castillon Ranillo Sr. (b. 1898, d. 1947) - governor of the undivided Province of Zamboanga (1937–1940) and Lone District Congressman of the same province (1941–1946)
- Roseller Barinaga (b. 1936) - former Undersecretary for Mindanao of the National Anti-Poverty Commission (2017 - 2018), former congressman of 2nd District of Zamboanga del Norte (1998 - 2007), former City Mayor (1978 - 1986; 1988 - 1998) and Vice Mayor of Dipolog (1970 - 1978)
- Roberto Uy (b. 1951) - former Governor of Zamboanga del Norte (2013–2022); City Mayor of Dipolog (1998-2007; 2025-present)
- Zorro Aguilar (b. 1942 - d. 1984) - lawyer, activist, newspaper editor, and martial law victim.
- Amatong family
  - Jacobo Amatong (b. 1936 - d. 1984) - lawyer, editor-publisher for Mindanao Observer, former city councilor of Dipolog (1971 - his death) and martial law victim.
  - Prospero Amatong (b. 1931 – d. 2009) - former mayor of Nabunturan (1980 - 1986); former governor of the provinces of Davao del Norte (1988 - 1998) and Compostela Valley (now Davao de Oro) (3 months in 1998), and former congressman of 2nd District of Compostela Valley (1998 - 2007)
  - Juanita Amatong (b. 1935) - educator, banker, and former secretary of the Department of Finance (2003-2005)
  - Isagani Amatong (b. 1940) - lawyer, Congressman of 3rd District of Zamboanga del Norte (2013–present), former governor of Zamboanga del Norte (1986 - 1995; 1998 - 2004), and former City Councilor of Dipolog (1984 - 1986)
- Margarito "Gary" Teves (b. 1943) - former congressman of Negros Oriental's 3rd District and former secretary of the Department of Finance (2005-2010)

Media

- Bobby Nalzaro (b. 1963 - d. 2022) - Cebu-based news anchor for GMA Cebu, radio anchor for Super Radyo Cebu, and newspaper columnist for SunStar Cebu

Sports

- Jerry Barbaso (b. 1988) - Filipino footballer who last played as a defender for Ceres–Negros F.C. in the Philippines Football League, and Philippines national football team
- Eddie Laure (b. 1977) - Filipino former professional basketball player (1998 - 2016), and basketball coach (assistant coach for UST Tigresses in UAAP since 2016, and Biñan City Heroes in MPBL since 2018)

Entertainment

- Boboy Garrovillo (b. 1951) - actor and musician, member of the APO Hiking Society
- Chico Alicaya - Pinoy Big Brother: Connect contestant from Dipolog City but represented Cebu who fell short for Big Four.
- Kobie Brown - a Filipino-British actor from Dipolog who competed at Pinoy Big Brother: Connect and won 3rd big placer representing Parañaque.

Culinary

- Nouel Omamalin Catis - Dubai-based pastry chef, consultant, and creator of the Dubai chocolate

Pageantry

- Marie Razel Eguia (b. 1988) - Miss Philippines Earth 2008 contestant representing Dipolog and crowned Miss Philippines Air (1st Runner-Up) in the same competition

== Sister cities ==
Date	City		Ref.
2018	(Taiwan)	Yancheng District, Kaohsiung City	

== References and notes ==
Notes
