= Dipolog Boulevard =

Road in the Philippines

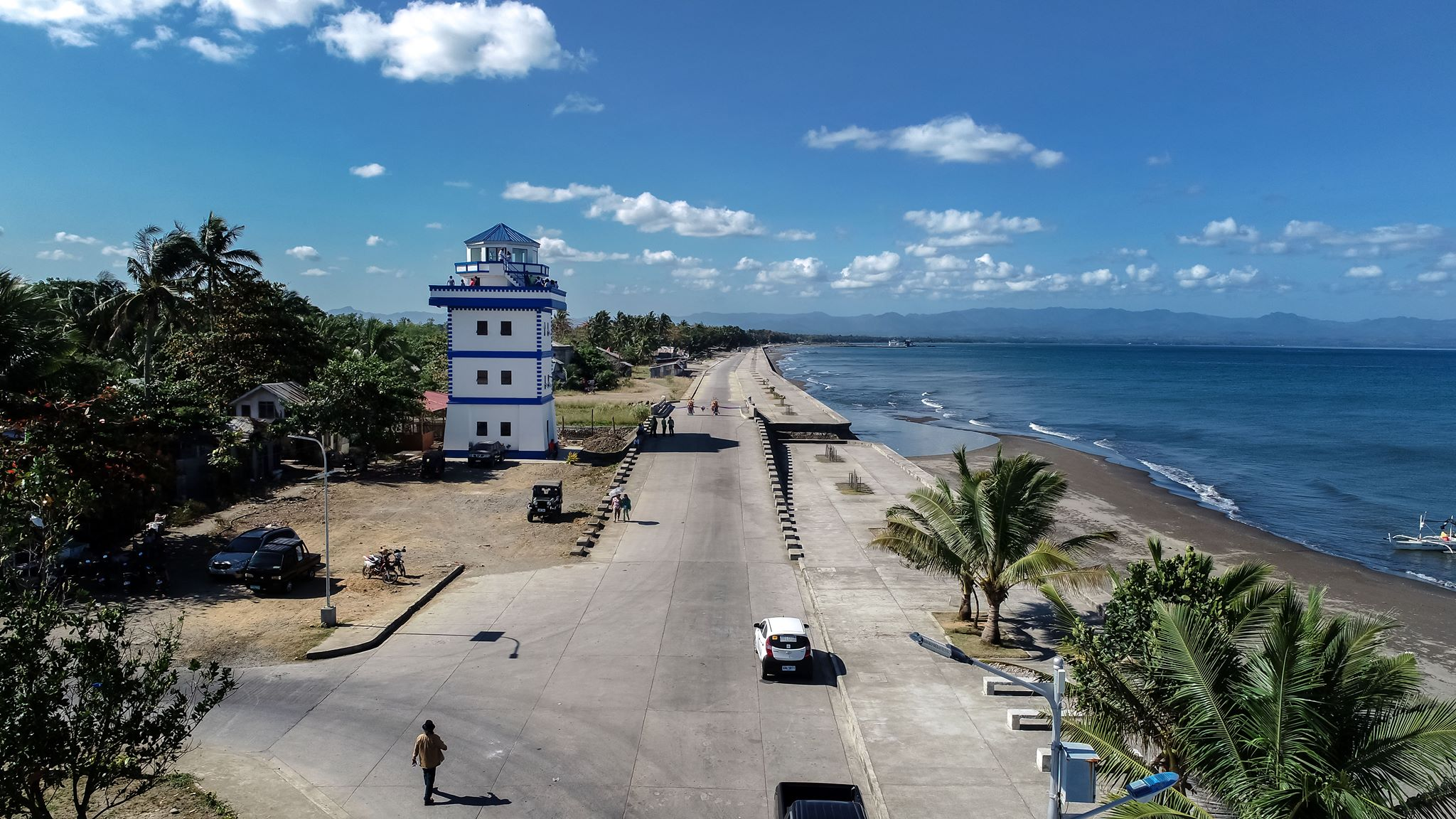

Route information
- Maintained by City Government of Dipolog
- Length: 3.6 km (2.2 mi)
- Existed: 2000s–present

Major junctions
- North end: Ranillo Street, Barangay Central
- Rizal Avenue; Echavez Street; General Luna Street; General Malvar Street; Tomas Claudio Street; Amatong Street; Velasco Street; Surf Road
- South end: Dipolog City Port, Barangay Galas

Location
- Country: Philippines
- Major cities: Dipolog

Highway system
- Roads in the Philippines; Highways; Expressways; List

The Foreshore Development and Wellness Center, well-known locally as the Dipolog Boulevard, is an esplanade in Dipolog, Zamboanga del Norte along a 3.6 kilometers stretch of foreshore spanning from Sta. Cruz of Barangay Central to Purok Bularan of Barangay Miputak and to Dipolog Port, Barangay Galas, Dipolog City. It is equipped with basketball courts and playground part. It is also the site of the annual "P'gsalabuk Festival" and other similar events, motor company trade shows, and sporting events like marathons and triathlons. There are two commercial buildings augmenting the presently existing restaurants, bars, and several food and beverage peddlers.

Extension is currently underway to extend the boulevard for another kilometer reaching the seaport of Galas making it a total of 2.6 kilometers. Long term plans for the boulevard is extending it in both ways of the city to southern part of Olingan and northern part of Barra creating a new river park esplanade. Also included for foreshore development are areas of Minaog and Sicayab that goes beyond the Dipolog Airport. All of the said plans are drafted in the city's blueprint program named SWIGAPORE 2030 that aims in making Dipolog a self-reliant, super city by 2030 in terms of infrastructure, housing. social and health services.

== Landmarks ==
- Santa Cruz Marker - also known as Punta Corro, it is a Christian cross planted by the Boholanos settling in Dipolog on May 1, 1905.
- Boulevard Commercial Complex - a two-story, two-building structure which is a host to prospective locators who wish to do business in the area, augmenting the presently existing restaurants, bars, and several foods and beverage peddlers.
- Explore Dipolog Landmark - opened in November 2019 which features the slogan of the same line, and it is near the Dipolog Watchtower.

== Gallery ==
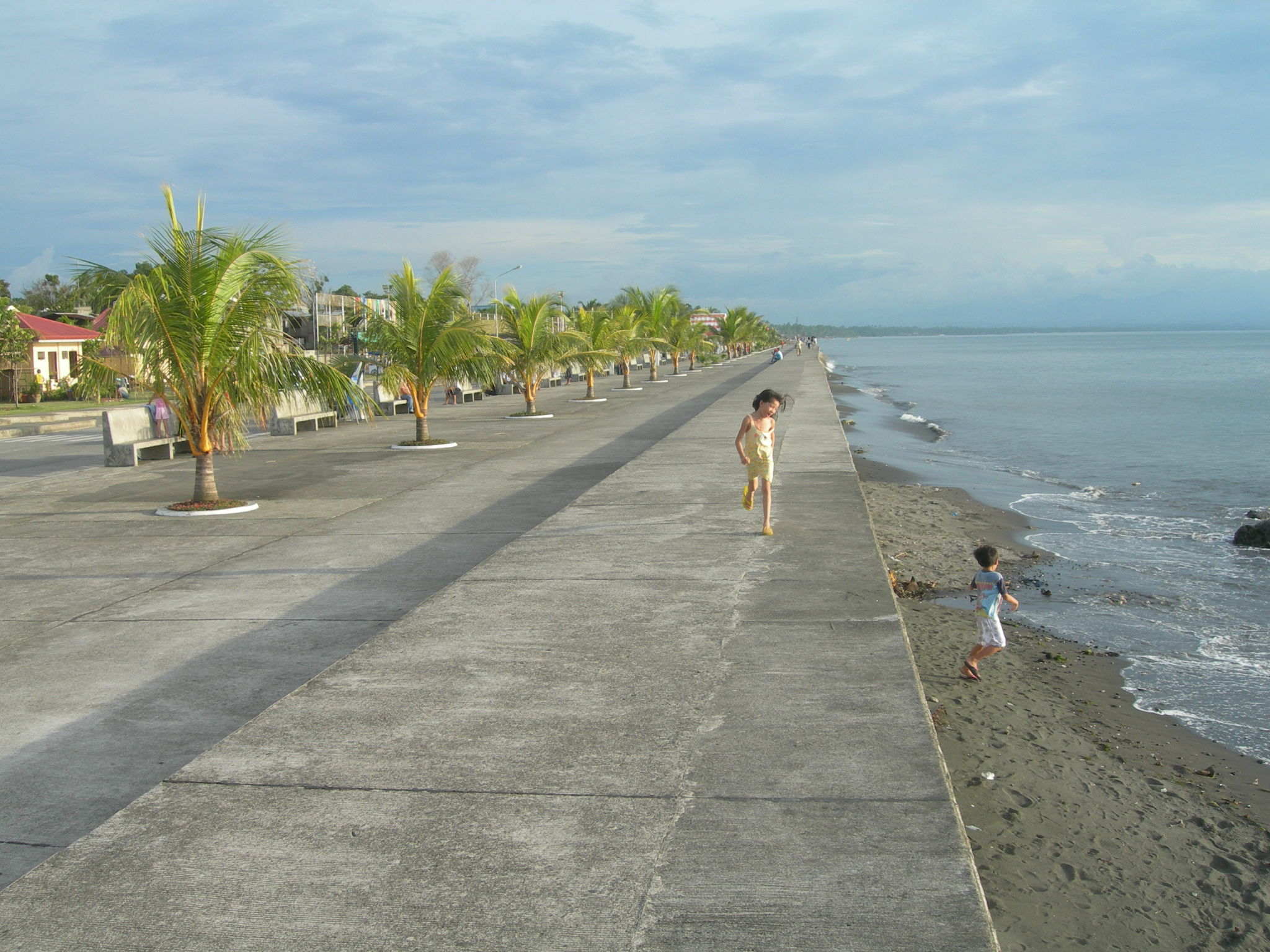
Dipolog Sunset Boulevard (2008)

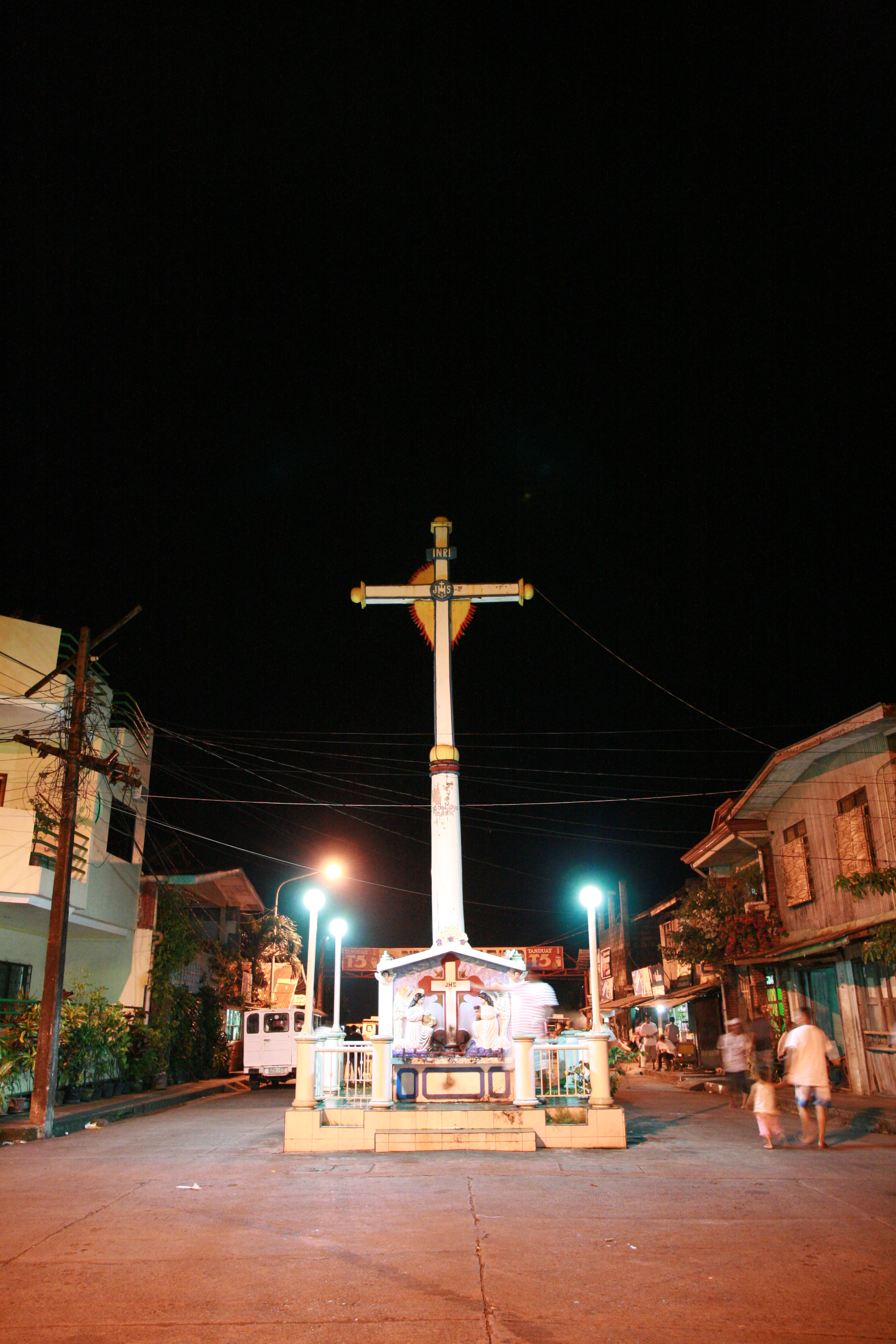
Santa Cruz Marker

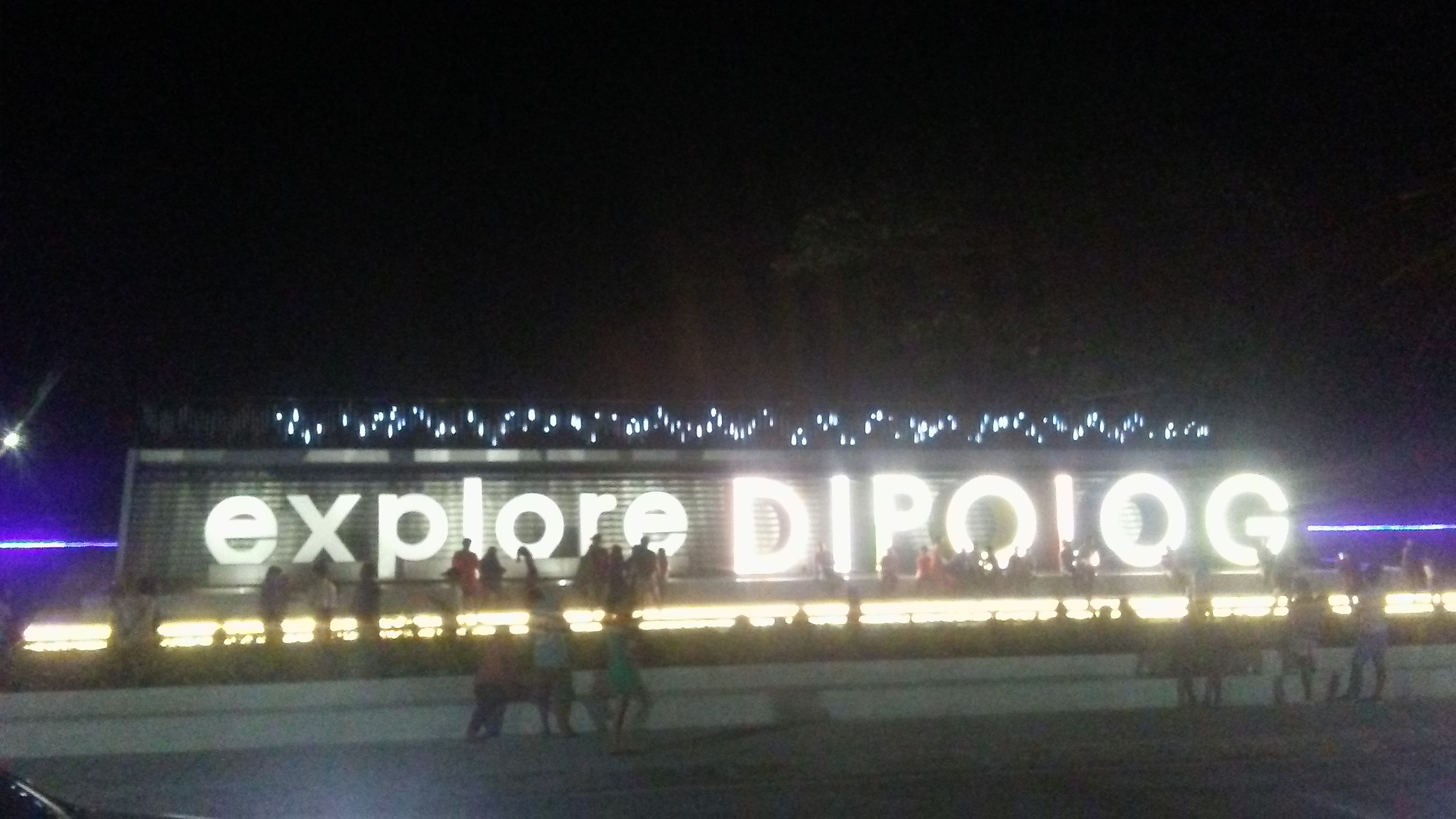
Explore Dipolog Landmark (2019)
