= Port of Dipolog =

Port in the Philippines

Port of Dipolog Galas Feeder Port
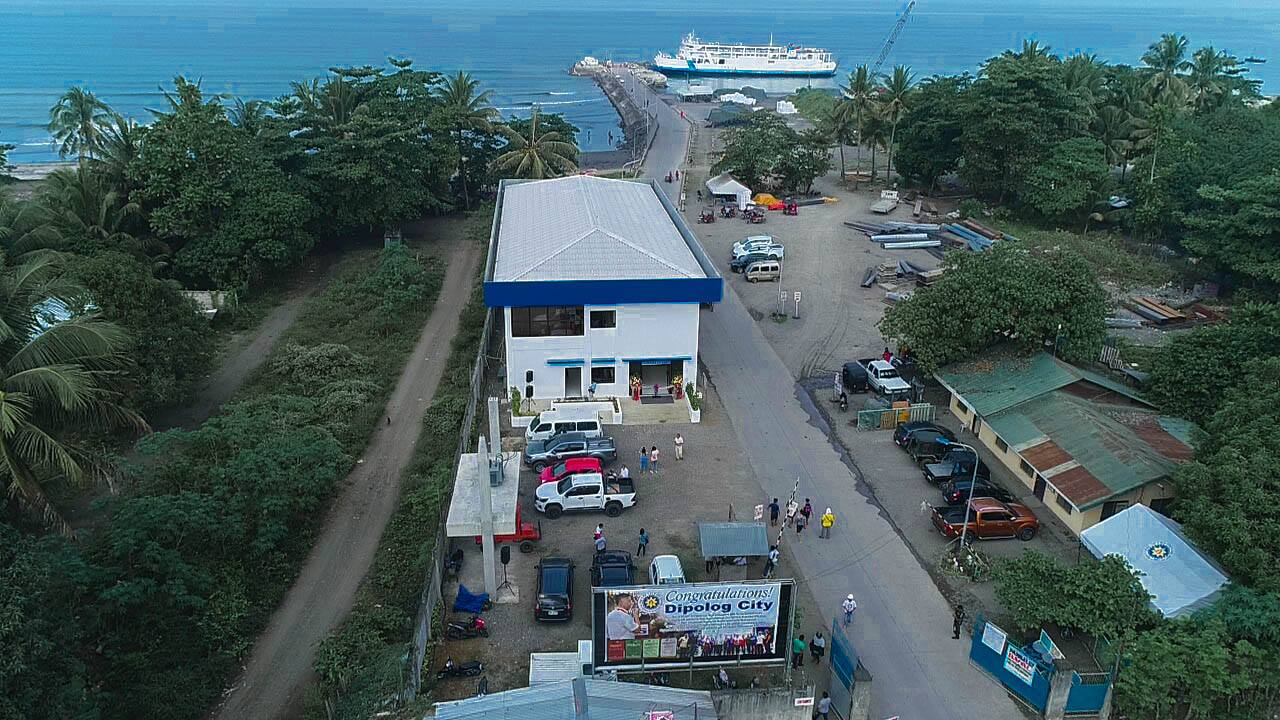
- Terminal complex and wharf in 2019.
- Interactive map of Port of Dipolog; Galas Feeder Port
- Location in Mindanao#Philippines Port of Dipolog; Galas Feeder Port (Philippines)

Location
- Country: Philippines
- Location: Mindanao Sea, Mindanao island, the Philippines
- Coordinates: 8°33′35″N 123°19′41″E
- UN/LOCODE: PHDPL

Details
- Opened: 2015
- Operated by: Philippine Ports Authority; City Government of Dipolog
- Owned by: City Government of Dipolog
- Type of harbour: Natural/Artificial
- No. of wharfs: 3
- No. of piers: 2

Statistics
- Vessel arrivals: 94,702 (2022)
- Passenger traffic: 196,522 (2022)

The Port of Dipolog, originally and formerly known as the Galas Feeder Port (Filipino: Daungan ng Galas, Cebuano: Pantalan sa Galas), is a seaport in Dipolog, Philippines. It is owned and managed by the City Government of Dipolog.

== History ==
The Port of Dipolog started as a landing area for smaller fishing boats or bancas. Later, the city government under the administration of Mayor Roseller Barinaga planned to erect docking platforms, and transform it into a feeder port to accommodate smaller sea vessels that cannot dock at nearby Port of Dapitan which is barely 12 kilometers away.

In 2007, the city government signified its plan to upgrade the feeder port into a passenger port and had made a memorandum of agreement between the city government and Philippine Ports Authority for the port's operation. From that time, there was no shipping company serving the port until in the year 2015. However, in 2018, allegations on the port's operation floated as then-First District Representative Bullet Jalosjos called for the port's immediate closure for it lacked port security forces like the Philippine Coast Guard, Philippine Drug Enforcement Agency, and the Philippine National Police Maritime Group.

On January 23, 2019, after four years of operating, the new Passenger Terminal was open to the public. In the same year, the Maritime Industry Authority opened a missionary route between Dipolog and Siaton, Negros Oriental, a municipality south of Dumaguete. On August 27 of 2020, the City Government, with the help of the Philippine Coast Guard, formally opened the Coast Guard Sub-Station situated within the grounds of the port.

== Shipping firms and destinations ==
- Medallion Transport - Cebu City (company previously operated trips to and from Dumaguete)
- Lite Ferries - Oslob, Cebu (both direct and via Dumaguete; alternating with Dapitan's port)

== Statistics ==
Passenger Statistics
Year	Total	Disembarking	Embarking	Ref.
2015	54,856	28,996	25,860	
2016	94,329	48,729	45,600	
2017	112,730	60,067	52,663	
2018	235,436	123,022	112,414	
2019	395,942	195,005	200,937	
2020	82,758	38,321	44,437	
2021	48,947	25,364	23,583	
2022	196,522	94,702	101,820	

== Incidents ==
- On the morning of May 31, 2019, onboard MV Lady of Joy of Medallion Transport, a mother jumped off that vessel with her seven-month-old infant as the ship was approaching Galas Port. Both the mother and the infant were rescued and brought to the nearest hospital for medical treatment.

== See also ==
- List of ports in the Philippines
- Dipolog
