= Francesco Palliola =

Italian Jesuit priest and missionary (1612-1648)

Servant of God Francesco Palliola SJ
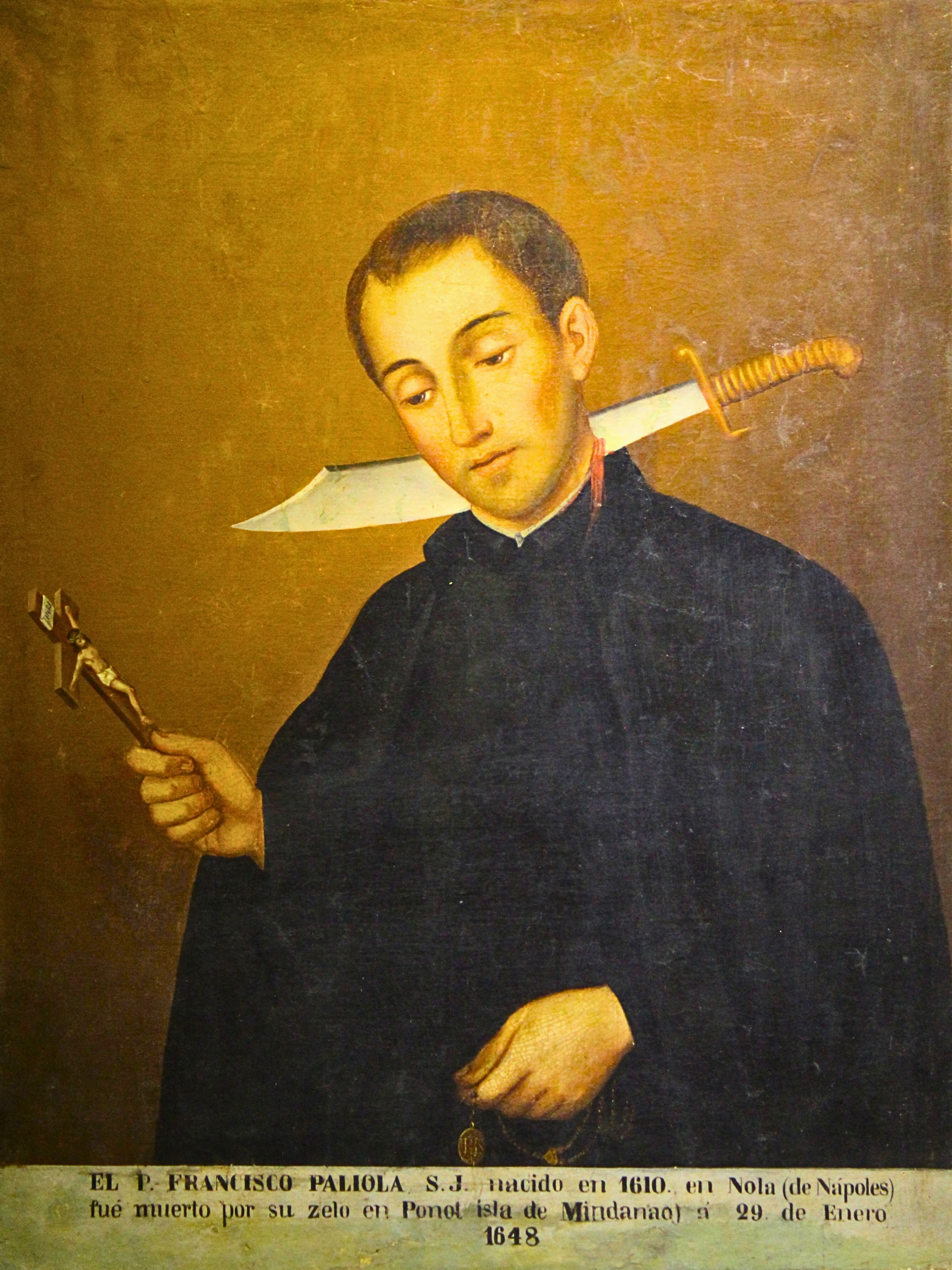
- Born: 10 May 1612; Nola, Naples, Italy
- Died: 29 January 1648 (aged 35); Ponot, Misamis, Captaincy General of the Philippines

Francesco Palliola, SJ (May 10, 1612 – January 29, 1648) was an Italian Jesuit priest and missionary in Mindanao, Philippines.

== Life ==
Padre Francesco was born on 10 May 1612 in Nola, Naples, Italy.

Palliola was on his way home from Sindangan to Dapitan while riding a horse when a certain bandit, a converted native named Tampilo, carrying a long bolo suddenly appeared, attacked, and beheaded him leading to his demise. The priest's body was then buried along the wide stretch of a beach at Sitio Tabang near the townsite and is still present today.

== Beatification process ==
The cause of beatification for Francesco Palliola was opened by the Diocese of Dipolog on January 6, 2016. On September 2017, the diocesan level of study for Palliola's beatification was closed by Bishop Severo Caermare at the Dipolog Cathedral in Dipolog City. In October 2018, the Congregation for the Causes of Saints has declared as valid the investigation into the beatification process for a 16th-century Jesuit missionary who served in Mindanao.

== Gallery ==
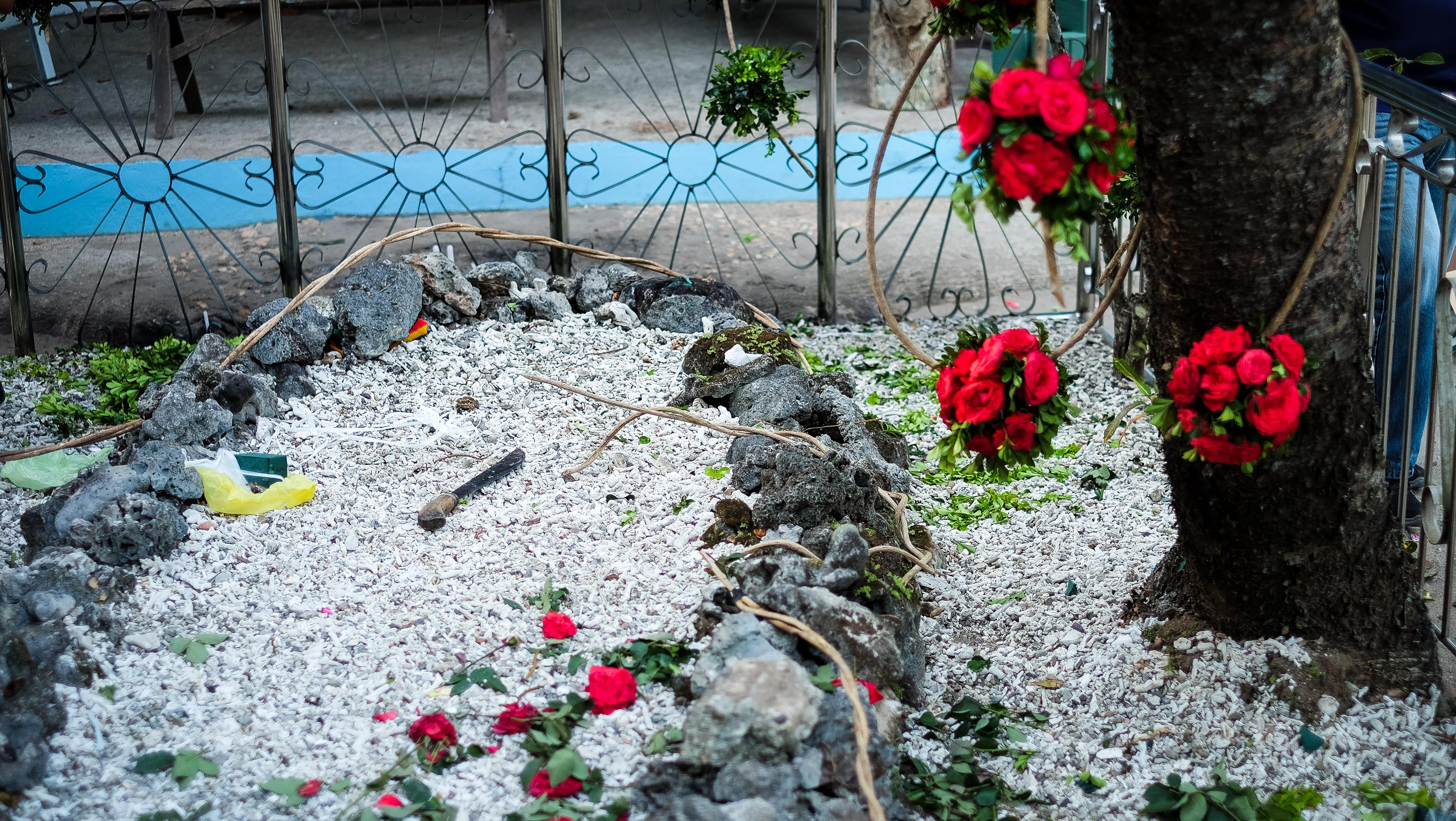
Site of Francesco Palliola's killing in present-day Jose Dalman, Zamboanga del Norte

== See also ==
- List of Filipinos venerated in the Catholic Church
