= Diocese of Iligan =

Latin Catholic diocese in the Philippines

Coordinates: 8.2291°N 124.2395°E

Diocese of Iligan Dioecesis Iliganensis Diyosesis sa Iligan Diyosesis ng Iligan

Catholic
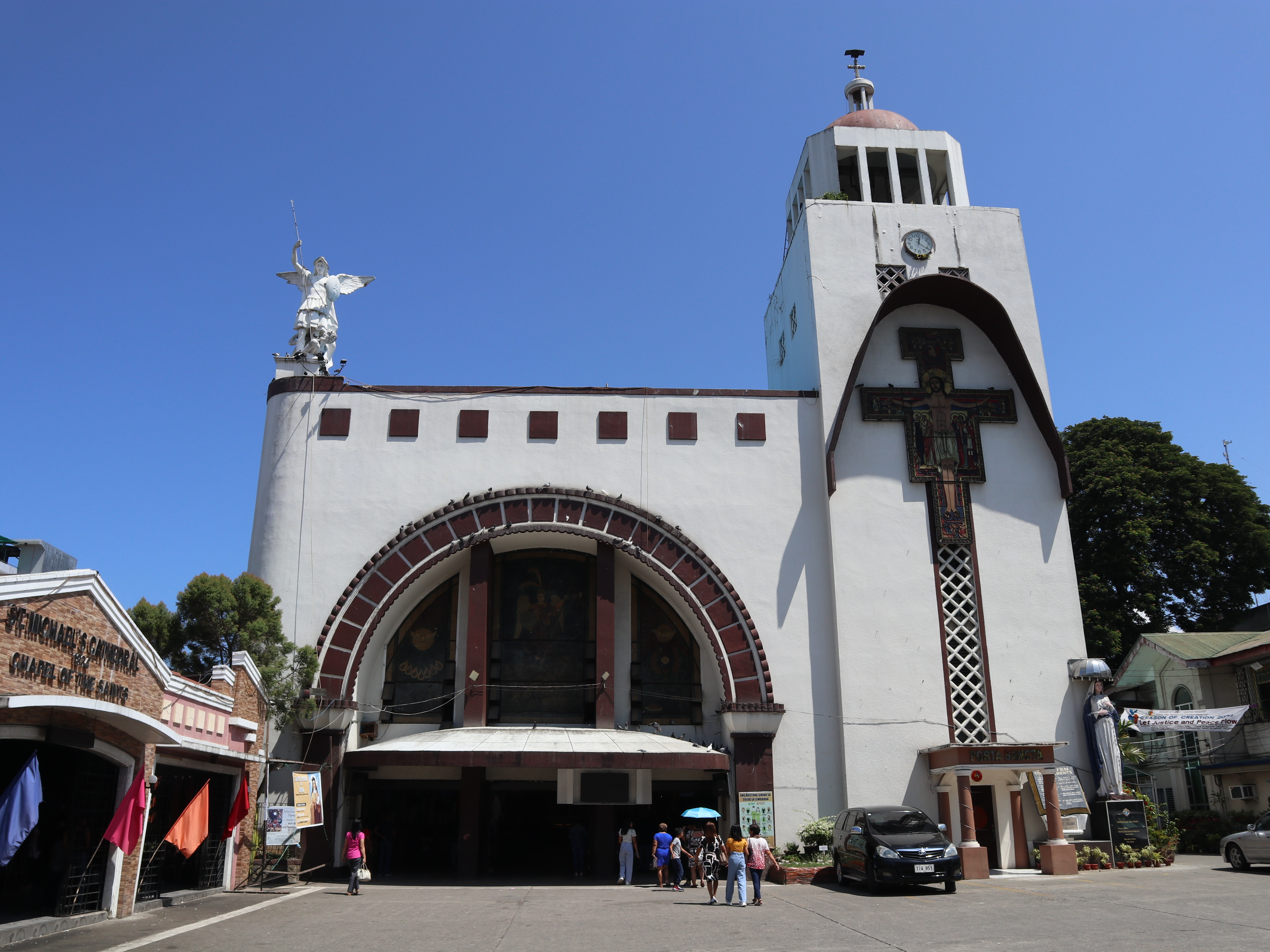
- Iligan Cathedral

- Coat of arms

Location
- Country: Philippines
- Territory: Lanao del Norte (Bacolod, Baroy, Iligan City, Kapatagan, Kauswagan, Kolambugan, Lala, Linamon, Magsaysay, Maigo, Salvador, Sapad, Tubod)
- Ecclesiastical province: Ozamis

Statistics
- Area: 3,092 km^{2} (1,194 sq mi)
- Population: Total; Catholics: (as of 2021); 1,206,648; 715,562 (59.3%)
- Parishes: 26

Information
- Denomination: Catholic Church
- Sui iuris church: Latin Church
- Rite: Roman Rite
- Established: February 17, 1971 (Prelature), November 15, 1982 (Diocese)
- Cathedral: St. Michael's Cathedral
- Patron saint: Michael the Archangel
- Secular priests: 40

Current leadership
- Pope: Leo XIV
- Bishop: Jose Rapadas III
- Metropolitan Archbishop: Martin Jumoad
- Vicar General: Msgr. Rey Pati-an

The Diocese of Iligan (Lat: Dioecesis Iliganensis) is a Latin Church ecclesiastical jurisdiction or diocese of the Catholic Church in the Philippines, comprising 26 parishes in Iligan City and twelve municipalities located at the northern half of the province of Lanao del Norte.

== History ==
Erected on February 17, 1971, as a territorial prelature out of the newly elevated Diocese of Ozamis, it was subdivided on November 20, 1976, to form the new Territorial Prelature of Marawi.

On November 15, 1982, the prelature nullius was elevated to a full diocese and a suffragan to the Archdiocese of Cagayan de Oro and then later to the Archdiocese of Ozamis after the latter's elevation to archdiocese on January 24, 1983.

The current bishop is Jose Rapadas III, appointed in 2019. Bishop Rapadas was a diocesan clergyman from the Diocese of Ipil in the province of Zamboanga Sibugay. He is the fifth bishop of the Diocese.

== Ordinaries ==
No.	Name	From	Until	Consecrated Bishop	Coat of Arms
1	Bienvenido Solon Tudtud†	February 17, 1971 (Appointed)	April 25, 1977 (Appointed as Prelate of Marawi)		
2	Fernando Robles Capalla	April 25, 1977 (Appointed)	June 28, 1994 (Appointed as Coadjutor Archbishop of Davao)	April 2, 1975	
Sede vacante (June 29, 1994 - May 2, 1995)
3	Emilio Layon Bataclan	May 3, 1995 (Appointed)	June 21, 2004 (Resigned)	April 19, 1990	
Sede vacante (June 22, 2004 - March 24, 2006)
4	Elenito de los Reyes Galido	March 25, 2006 (Appointed)	December 5, 2017 (Died in office)	September 8, 2006	
Sede vacante (December 6, 2017 - June 12, 2019) (Under the care of Severo Cagatan Caermare as the diocesan administrator while serving as bishop of Dipolog.)
5	Jose Ramirez Rapadas III	June 13, 2019 (Appointed)	Incumbent	August 20, 2019	

== See also ==
- Catholic Church in the Philippines
