= Jose Rapadas III =

Filipino Catholic bishop (born 1972)

The Most Reverend Jose Rapadas III D.D.
- Bishop of Iligan
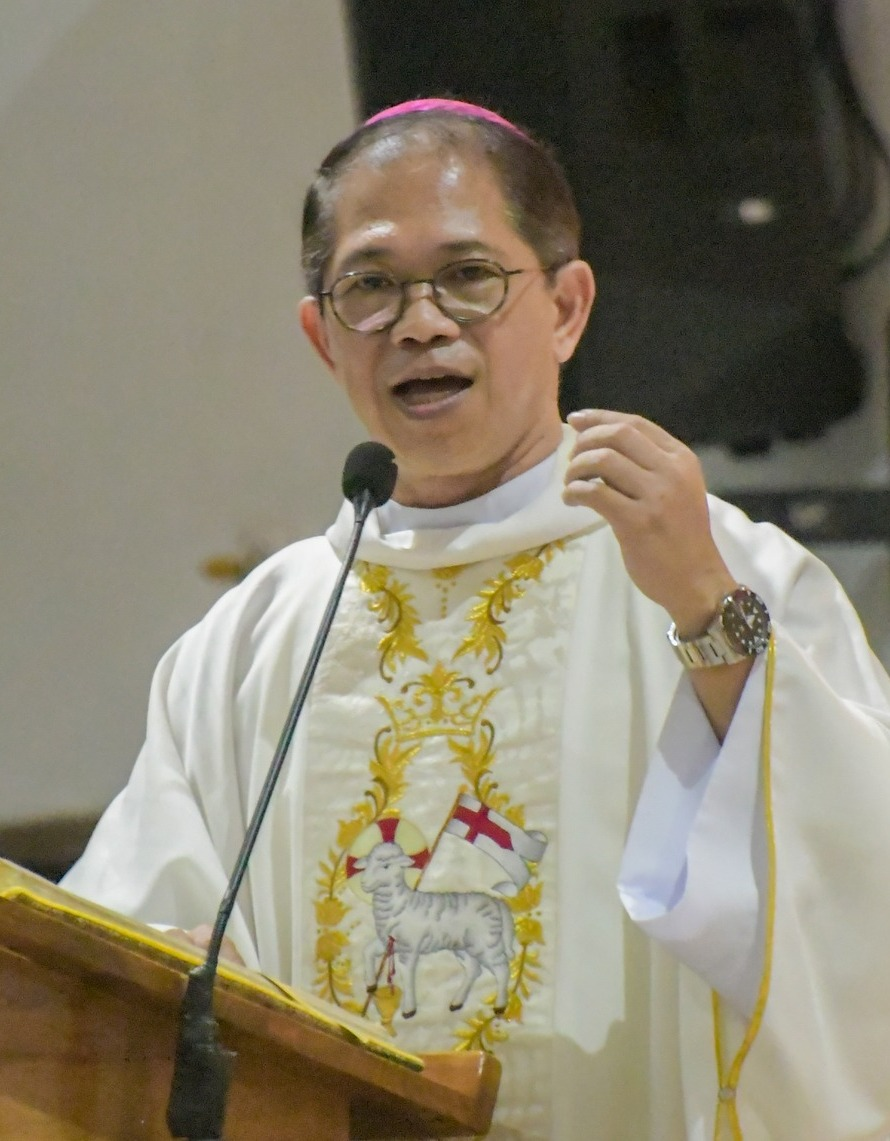
- Rapadas in 2024
- Province: Ecclesiastical Province of Ozamis
- See: Iligan
- Installed: 13 June 2019
- Predecessor: Elenito Galido

Orders
- Ordination: 19 May 1999 by Antonio Ledesma
- Consecration: 20 August 2019 by Julius Tonel

Personal details
- Born: Jose Ramirez Rapadas III; July 12, 1972 (age 54) Tondo, Manila, Philippines
- Denomination: Roman Catholicism
- Education: Loyola School of Theology; St. John Vianney Theological Seminary
- Motto: Quia audit servus tuus
- Coat of arms

Jose Ramirez Rapadas III (born July 12, 1972) is a Filipino prelate of the Roman Catholic Church. He is currently the Bishop of the Diocese of Iligan in the Philippines.

== Background ==
Rapadas was born on July 12, 1972, in Tondo, Manila, but he was raised in Ipil, Zamboanga Sibugay. He attended St. John Vianney Theological Seminary in Cagayan de Oro, and was ordained a priest in 1999. He also attended the Loyola School of Theology at the Ateneo de Manila University where he obtained his licentiate in dogmatic theology.

== Ministry ==
=== Sacerdotal ===
He served as a seminary professor and rector at Saint Joseph College Seminary, and as professor of religious studies University of Zamboanga. Prior to his appointment as bishop of Iligan, he served as vicar general of the diocese of Ipil in Zamboanga Sibugay.

=== Episcopal ===
Pope Francis appointed Rapadas to be the 5th Bishop of Iligan on June 13, 2019, nearly two years after the passing of then-Bishop Elenito Galido in 2017. He took over from Bishop Severo Caermare of the diocese of Dipolog whom Pope Francis had assigned to administer the parish during its sede vacante period.

Catholic Church titles
Preceded by Elenito R. Galido	Bishop of Iligan; 2019-Present	Incumbent
