= Felix Zafra =

Filipino Catholic bishop (1920–2002)

The Most Reverend Felix Sanchez Zafra D.D.
- Bishop Emeritus of Tagbilaran
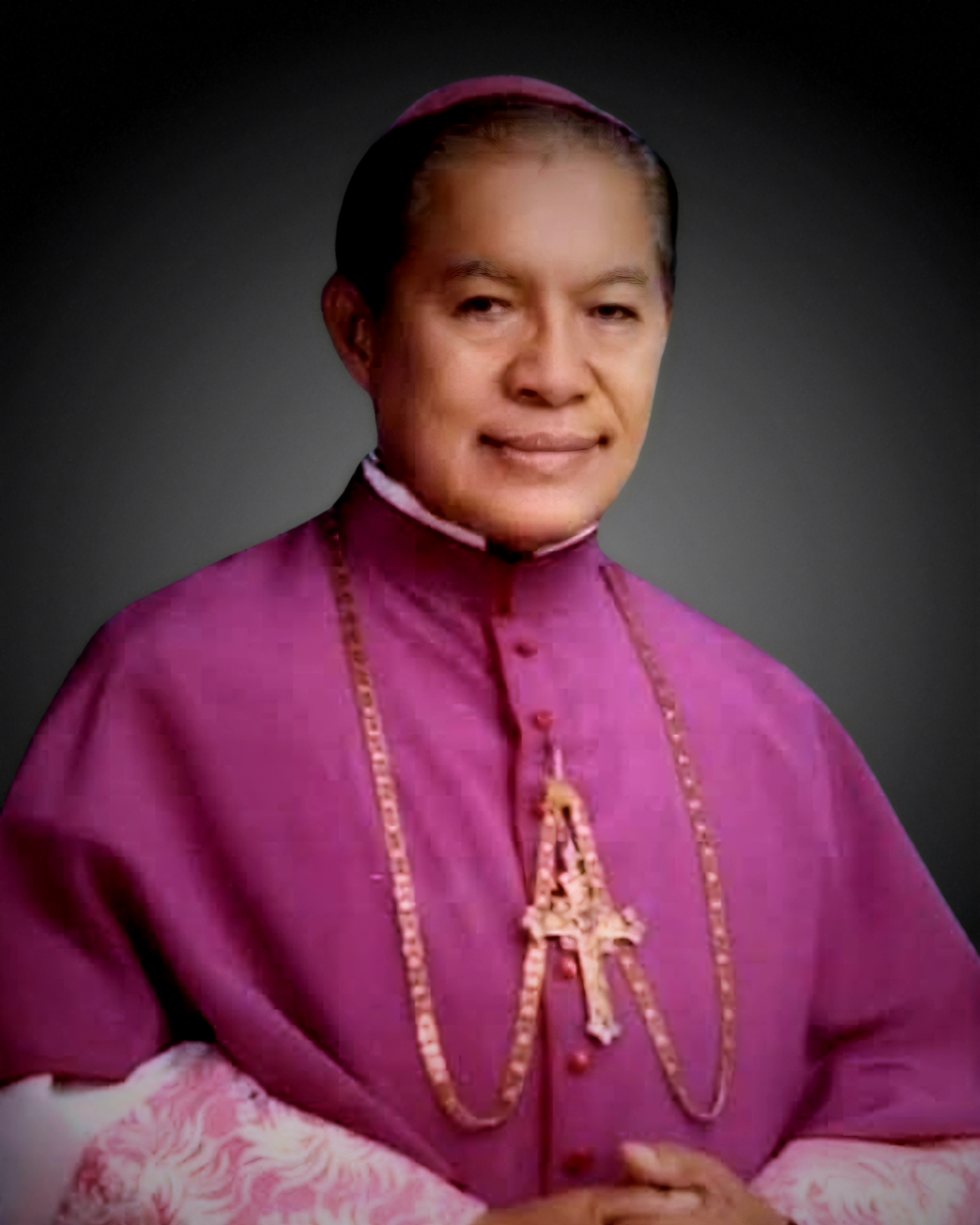
- Official profile with Zafra in choir dress
- Church: Roman Catholic
- Appointed: October 20, 1986
- Installed: December 2, 1986
- Retired: April 21, 1992
- Predecessor: Onesimo Cadiz Gordoncillo
- Successor: Leopoldo Sumaylo Tumulak
- Previous post: Bishop of Dipolog (1967 – 1986)

Orders
- Ordination: March 4, 1944 by Gabriel Martelino Reyes
- Consecration: October 22, 1967 by Manuel Mascariñas y Morgia

Personal details
- Born: January 14, 1920 Nahawan, Clarin, Bohol, Philippines
- Died: August 4, 2002 (aged 82) Bohol, Philippines
- Buried: Tagbilaran Cathedral
- Denomination: Catholic
- Parents: Tomas Zafra (father); Asuncion Sanchez (mother)
- Education: Seminario (Mayor) de San Carlos, Cebu City; St. John's University
- Motto: Ut vitam abundantius habeant (Latin for 'That they may have life, and have it more abundantly' – John 10:10)
- Coat of arms: Felix Sanchez Zafra's coat of arms

Ordination history
History
Priestly ordination
- Ordained by: Gabriel Martelino Reyes
Episcopal consecration
- Principal consecrator: Manuel Mascariñas y Morgia
- Co-consecrators: Manuel Sandalo Salvador; Jesus Yu Varela
- Styles
- Reference style: His Excellency; The Most Reverend
- Spoken style: Your Excellency
- Religious style: Bishop

Felix Sanchez Zafra (January 14, 1920 – August 4, 2002) was a Filipino prelate of the Roman Catholic Church who served as the fourth Bishop of Tagbilaran. and the 2nd native of Bohol consecrated as a bishop—the first being his principal consecrator, Bishop Manuel Mascariñas y Morgia. In his previous post, Zafra served as the first Bishop of Dipolog (1967–1986). He was later appointed Bishop of Tagbilaran, serving until his retirement on April 21, 1992.

== Early life ==
Felix Sanchez Zafra was born on January 14, 1920, in Barangay Nahawan, Clarin, Bohol, Philippines, into a prestigious family. His father, Tomas Zafra, was the first elected mayor of Clarin, and his mother, Asuncion Sanchez, belonged to one of the town’s most prominent families.

From childhood, Zafra exhibited early signs of a priestly vocation. He often play-acted as a priest, mimicking the Mass with his cousins as his "altar servers" and "schola." This youthful devotion bore lasting fruit: two of his playmates, Jovencio Sanchez and Pampilo Somosot, later became priests, while others entered religious life as nuns—rising to become local superiors in their respective orders.

== Education ==
After primary education at Nahawan Primary School and elementary studies at Clarin Elementary School (Bohol), Zafra completed his formation at Seminario (Mayor) de San Carlos, Cebu City. Following ordination, he earned an M.S.Ed. in Guidance and Counseling from St. John’s University, New York (1964).

== Priesthood ==
Felix Zafra was ordained a priest by His Excellency, Gabriel Martelino Reyes, on March 4, 1944, at the Cebu Metropolitan Cathedral. His early assignments included serving as:

- Assistant parish priest of St. Thomas of Villanova Parish in El Pardo, Cebu City (1944)
- Assistant parish priest of St. Catherine of Alexandria Parish in Carcar, Cebu (1944–1945).

From 1945 to 1952, he was assigned as assistant parish priest of Our Lady of Light Parish in Loon, Bohol. During this period, recognizing the need for Catholic education, he:

- Renovated the old rectory into an educational institution dedicated to the Most Sacred Heart of Jesus.
- Established the Sacred Heart Academy by 1948, serving as its founding director.

In 1952, he became rector of St. Joseph the Worker Cathedral in Tagbilaran, serving until 1955. He later returned to Loon, Bohol (1955–1960), this time as parish priest.

From 1960 to 1963, he served as:

- Spiritual director of the Immaculate Heart of Mary Seminary in Tagbilaran.
- Later, its vice-rector.

A notable initiative of his ministry was founding the “For More Priests Club” (now the St. Joseph Vocation Society), a scholarship foundation of the Diocese of Tagbilaran which:

Addressed the priest shortage in Bohol by promoting vocations. Raised funds to support seminarians who could not afford the expenses.

== Episcopacy ==
=== Diocese of Dipolog ===
Former coat of arms of Zafra as Bishop of Dipolog

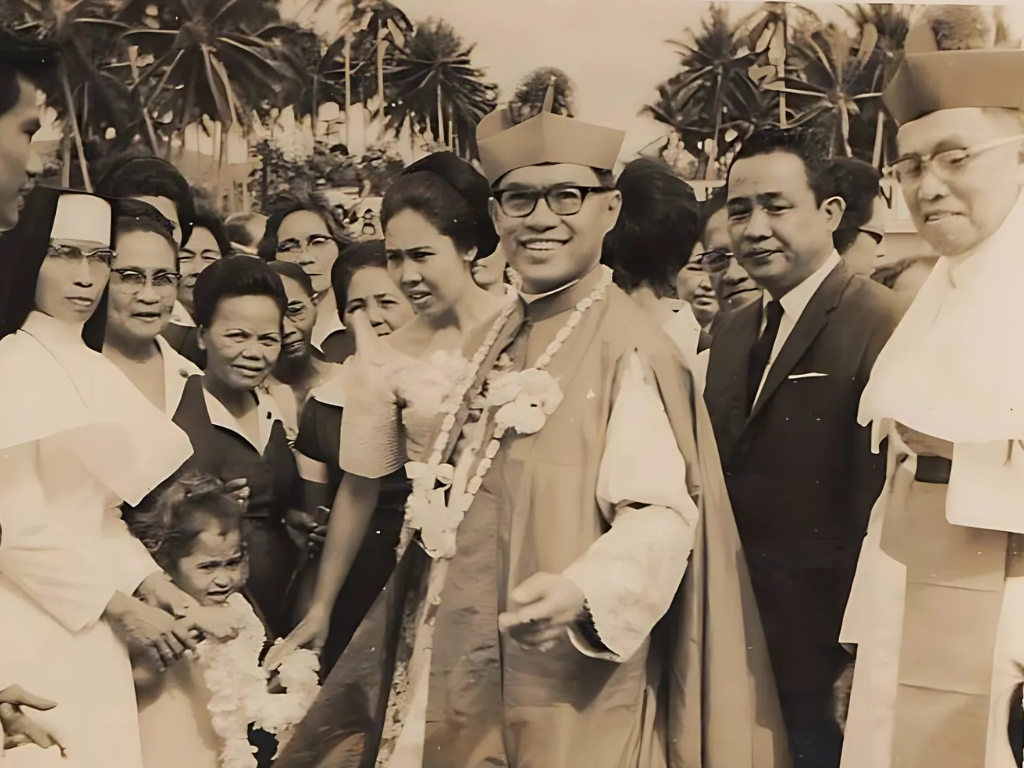
Most Rev. Felix S. Zafra, D.D., the first Bishop of Dipolog, arrives at the old Sicayab Airport (now St. John Neumann Parish), where he is welcomed by Archbishop Lino Gonzaga (right).

Pope Paul VI appointed Zafra as the first bishop of the newly-erected Diocese of Dipolog on July 31, 1967. The new diocese, carved out from the Archdiocese of Zamboanga at the request of Archbishop Lino Gonzaga y Rasdesales, encompassed the entire civil province of Zamboanga del Norte.

Zafra was consecrated on October 22, 1967, at the Carlos P. Garcia Sports Complex, with Bishop Manuel Mascariñas y Morgia as his principal consecrator. He took canonical possession of the diocese on October 24, 1967, establishing his episcopal seat at the newly-elevated Dipolog Cathedral (formerly the Parish of Our Lady of the Most Holy Rosary). His installation marked a significant moment in the region's ecclesiastical history, as he became the first shepherd of the Diocese of Dipolog.

In January 1970, during the annual meeting of the Catholic Bishops' Conference of the Philippines, he was elected chairman of the Commission for Unbelievers.

=== Diocese of Tagbilaran ===
On October 20, 1986, Pope John Paul II appointed Felix Zafra as the fourth Bishop of the Diocese of Tagbilaran. This followed the appointment of Most Reverend Onesimo Cadiz Gordoncillo as Archbishop of Capiz on June 18 that same year.

Installed as Bishop of Tagbilaran on December 2, 1986, he retired on April 21, 1992, at the age of 72, and served as the diocese's bishop emeritus until his death on August 4, 2002.

== Death ==
Zafra died on August 4, 2002, as Bishop Emeritus of Tagbilaran. His mortal remains rest in the right-wing side altar of the Diocesan Shrine and Cathedral-Parish of St. Joseph in Tagbilaran.

== See also ==
- Roman Catholic Diocese of Dipolog
- Roman Catholic Diocese of Tagabilaran
- Dipolog Cathedral
- Tagbilaran Cathedral
- Immaculate Heart of Mary Seminary

Catholic Church titles
| New diocese | Bishop of Dipolog; October 24, 1967 – October 20, 1986 | Succeeded by Jose Ricare Manguiran |
| Preceded by Onesimo Cadiz Gordoncillo | Bishop of Tagbilaran; December 2, 1986 – April 21, 1992 | Succeeded by Leopoldo Sumaylo Tumulak |
