= Ilaya =

- Barangay
- Barangay Ilaya
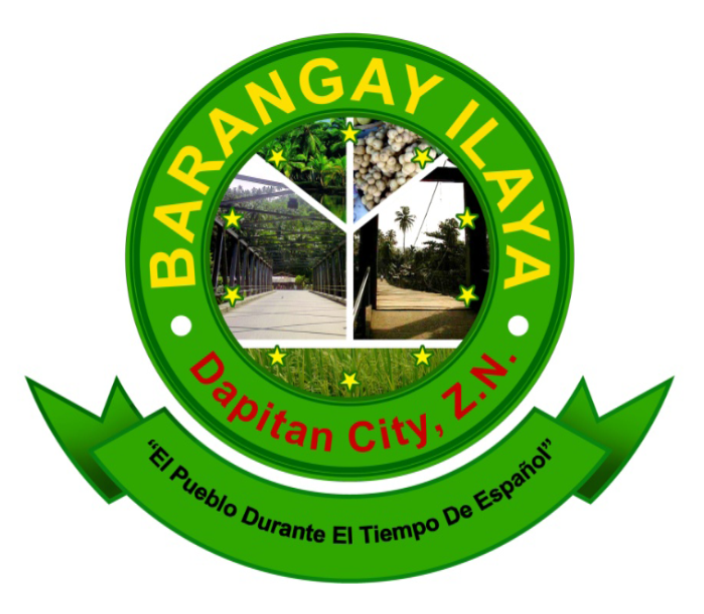
- Official Seal
- Motto: El Pueblo Durante El Tiempo de Español
- Location within Philippines
- Coordinates: 8°32′45″N 123°25′50″E
- Country: Philippines
- Region: Zamboanga Peninsula
- Province: Zamboanga del Norte
- City: Dapitan
- First Visayan Settlement: 1563
- Founded as Pueblo: 1768
- Founded as Barrio: January 31, 1901

Government
  - Barangay Captain: Predemar Duran Quizo
  - Kagawad: Bea Klariz E. Pardillo; Julius B. Elopre; Claubeth C. Bael; Ernesto B. Acoymo; Feliezer E. Duran; Enrico E. Estoque; Santiago Falconete Jr.

Area
  - Land: 1,839.75 ha (4,546.1 acres)

Population (2020)
  - Total: 2,873
- Zip Code: 7101

Ilaya is one of the interior barangays in Dapitan City, in the province of Zamboanga del Norte. It is located 15.8 km south from Dapitan City proper along Dapitan river. It has a land area of 1,839.75 hectares and a population of 2,873 people as of 2020.

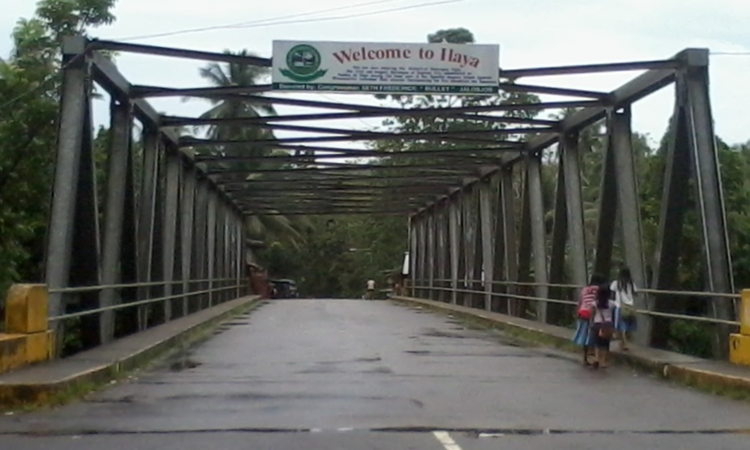
Ilaya steel bridge in Ilaya, Dapitan City. The view when entering the poblacion from the national highway. The Ilaya Steel Bridge is one of the bridges over the Dapitan river.

The vicinity of Ilaya is situated at 8.54° North latitude, 123.43° East longitude and 20 meters elevation above the sea level. It shares a common border with other barangays of Dapitan namely, Hilltop (north), Barcelona (south), Ba-ao (east) and Burgos (northwest). It also shares border with the municipality of Polanco in the west.

The first people of Ilaya were the Subanen of Indonesian in origin known to have settled and lived along the banks of the river or "suba". They were people of the river who believed in the spirit and the forces of nature. Timuay is the traditional title for the communal leader who is also the chief arbiter of conflict between the families of a community. Subanens held "buklog" to propitiate the diwata or to celebrate an event of communal significance and is exclusively performed by the balian. The functions of a balian are those of a medium who directs the living person's communication with the spirits, of a priest who conducts sacrifices and rituals, and of a healer of the sick.

In 1563, some Eskayan followers of Datu Pagbuaya arrived and settled in Ilaya.

During the Spanish occupation, Ilaya became a town known as "Pueblo de San Lorenzo" with its own local government under an executive called Gobernadorcillo. The Spanish authorities created the pueblo de San Lorenzo to extend administrative control of the area in order to extract tribute and instate forced labor to the community. The barrios had to be integrated into the colonial framework so the Spanish authority instituted a policy of resettlement or "reducciones" (reduction) which would consolidate population in larger villages. This policy resulted to the incorporation of the communities from Oyan to Dampalan, well as the present municipalities of Sibutad, Piñan, Rizal, Mutia (Salvacion) and La Libertad as barrios of Pueblo de San Lorenzo.

On January 31, 1901, the American authorities reorganized the municipal government through Public Act 82, a general act for the organization of municipal governments in the Philippine Islands. With the new law, Pueblo de San Lorenzo became a barrio of Ilaya under the municipality of Dapitan which is also under the province of Zamboanga.

== Origin of the Name "Ilaya" ==
There are a number of theories about the origin of the name "Ilaya". One of which is that the name is said to have been derived from a place in Spain called Ilaya.

Ilaya may also be a distortion of the Spanish word "La Playa", from the location being in a narrow stretch along the bank of the body of water. The word "ilaya" is also means "inland", "upland", "highland" or "rural" in Visayan word.

According to the book Wood & Stone, for Gods greater glory, Jesuit Art & Architecture in the Philippines, Ilaya is an old Jesuit mission station which means "the place in the direction of the mountain.

Another theory is that it was Dr. Jose P. Rizal who named the place Ilaya in honor of the place where La Liga Filipina was organized. Rizal organized the La Liga Filipina, a progressive organization, in the house of Doroteo Ongjunco at Ilaya Street, Tondo, Manila in 1892. During his exile in Dapitan, he was engaged in a profitable business venture with Ramon Carreon, in fishing, copra and hemp (abaca) industry. He named the place where he gets his abaca supply Ilaya.

A widely accepted legend is about the mananambal, meaning a herbalist, named Ilay and Laya, who lived in the place near the river, now called Dapitan River. They are well known for their ability to heal illnesses not only to their locality but also to the neighboring places as well. To honor them, the place where they lived was called after them as "Ilay" and "Laya" which eventually became Ilaya.

In the map of the Philippines archipelago by Jesuit Father Pedro Murillo Velarde of 1734, the name Yraya is mentioned along with Dapitan and Diporog (Dipolog).

== History ==
Long before the Spanish came to Zamboanga peninsula, the area around Ilaya was already settled by the peaceful Subanen tribes. Subanen are indigenous people known to live along the river or "suba" in the local language. They fished, hunted and crops for food. They also hand-wove their own clothing out of plant fibers.

=== Subanen Settlements ===
According to Subanen history, Ilaya was once a part of the Subanen territory ruled by Datu Tangkilan.

Most of the Subanen settlement were riverine in orientation. The principal sources of protein was from the river and the people were relying more on fishing than on hunting for sustenance. The river was the major source of water for bathing, washing and drinking. The river was also a vital mode of transportation in moving goods and people. People travelled principally by water during this period.

It was also at this time that the culture and commerce started to flourished. The communities, being along the river, were easily accessible to other communities like the Chinese and Visayan traders. It resulted in the exchanges not only with goods but the culture as well.

=== Tribe Chieftains Period ===
It is said that there were eight (8) tribes who lived in the place now called Ilaya. They were Suminod, Mialen, Eknan, Yabu, Gomoray, Andapon, Tapalon and Limones. Suminod and his men lived in the eastern part of the valley, they were the ancestors of the Dagpin family. Mialen ruled in the nearby area now called "Bolisong". Eknan, to be ancestors of the Baje, clan lived in the central plain of the valley. Yabu, the ancestors of the Elopre clan, settled in the Southeastern portion of the valley, known as Sitio Yabu named after him. The Gomoray, who ruled the place called "Waknit" (bats), a mountain area in the northeastern part now called Hilltop, are the ancestors of the Quizo and Bayron families. Andapon ruled the place Moson now called Barcelona. Limones, a caveman lived with his men in a secret cave situated at one mountain in the western portion now Oyan just adjacent with Tapalon's tribe which is now called Burgos.

=== Visayan People Arrival ===
In 1563, Datu Pagbuaya of Kedatuan of Dapitan (formerly located in present-day Panglao, Bohol), with some 1000 families, arrived in Mindanao after the Kedatuan of Dapitan in Bohol was destroyed by the Sultanate of Ternate. Datu Pagbuaya established the new Kedatuan of Dapitan in the northern part of Zamboanga peninsula of what is now known as Dapitan.

Some of the followers of Datu Pagbuaya, the Eskayas moved upstream of the Dapitan river and settled in Ilaya. It has been argued that the Eskaya are a remnant of the original indigenous settlers in Bohol. They migrated to Bohol from Sumatra in the seventh century and became involved with the conflict between Kedatuan of Dapitan and Sultanate of Ternate. The Eskayas speak a Boholano dialect, however, they are better known for an auxiliary language, known as Eskayan or Ineskaya.

Foreign trade and commerce bloomed during this period. It also marked the beginning of a wide trade between Muslims and the Ilaya natives. There is a curious story that the trade with the Muslim nations accidentally started when Muslim pirates pursued Uray, daughter of Manook, son of Datu Pagbuaya, to marry her. Datu Pagbuaya, refused and escaped with Uray through Dapitan river. The Muslims followed them upstream but was not able to find Uray. They continued their search along the river and eventually developed a trade relation with the river communities including the settlement in Ilaya.

=== Spanish Era ===
Two years after the arrival of the Visayans, Spanish expedition led by Miguel López de Legazpi and Andrés de Urdaneta landed in Dapitan and were received hospitably by Pagbuaya.

It was told that Datu Pagbuaya invited the Spanish missionaries to go with him to visit to his friends, Kantolan, Gomoray, Iknan and Mialen in the highlands. This invitation was accepted with joy by the missionaries. They were met and welcomed by the Subanons which were then baptized. The missionaries then left with the promise to come back.

In 1571, Ilaya (was called Guindáyan at that time), along with Dapitan, Sicayab and Dipolog was assigned as encomiendas by Legazpi to Pedro Brizeño de Oseguera.

==== Arrival of the Jesuits ====
With the expansion of the Spanish regime in northern Mindanao, Fr. Pascual de Acuña, a Jesuit priest, arrived in Dapitan in year 1602 as the chaplain of the Spanish expeditionary squadron assigned to convert the natives. By 1607, some 200 natives became formal converts to Christianity, among them were the son of Datu Pagbuaya, Don Pedro Manooc and Manooc's daughter Doña Maria Uray. By 1631, the Dapitan mission was permanently established. Later missions were founded in Bayuc, Dipolog, Lubungan, Misamis.

In Ilaya, the missionaries in Dapitan opened the "Escuela Catolica" to teach the Subanos in reading and writing the Spanish language and of the Doctrina Christiana. The classes were divided into two, to separate the boys from the girls. The teachers also conducted regular house to house lectures.

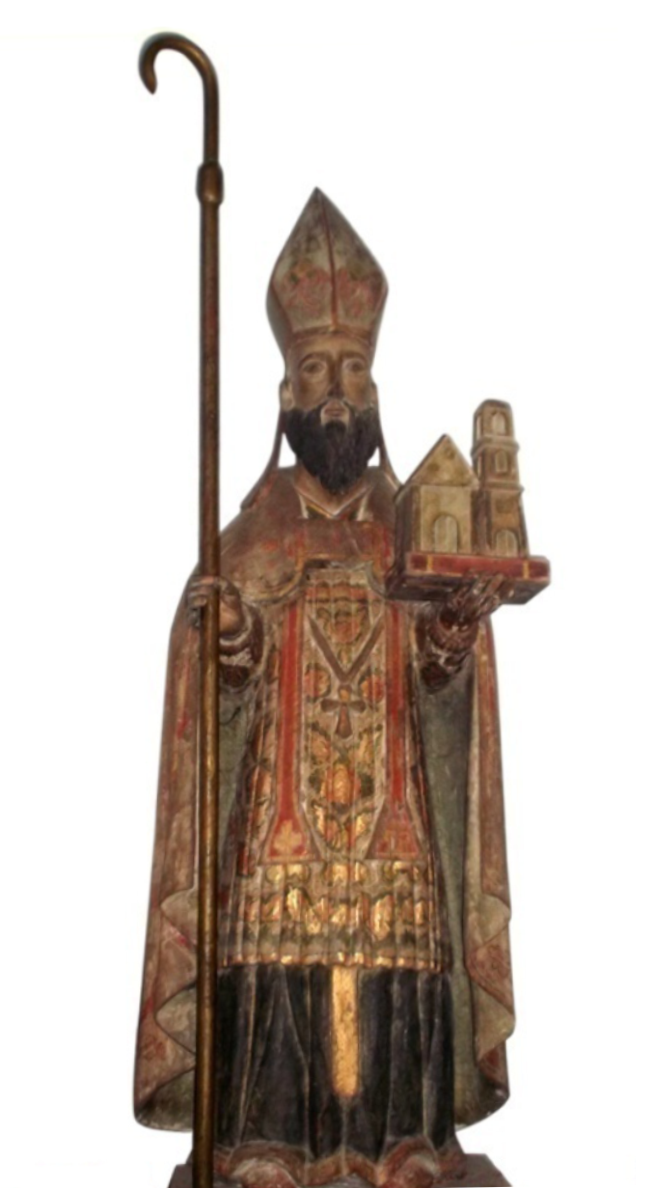
Statue of Saint Augustine in Ilaya.

In 1700, with the expansion of the Jesuits to the south of Mindanao, a Jesuit mission station was established in Ilaya. The Jesuits continued with their mission until 1768 when they had to leave Mindanao by the Royal Order of King Charles III. The parishes under their care: Zamboanga, Dapitan, Bayog, Lubungan, Dipolog, Iligan, Initao, Ilaya, and Misamis, were taken over by the Recoletos and the diocesan clergy of Cebu. It is believed that the Augustinian Recoletos friars brought the statue of Saint Augustine in the 1700s in Ilaya in this period. The human-size carving of Saint Augustine now lies on the altar of the Saint Lawrence Church.

==== The Recoletos and the Creation of Pueblo de San Lorenzo ====
It was during the time of the Recoletos that Ilaya became Pueblo de San Lorenzo. The pueblo de San Lorenzo was created so that the Spanish authorities can extend of administrative control to the community, which was a requirement in order to extract tribute and institute forced labor to the populace. The Spanish authorities also instituted a policy of resettlement or "reducciones" (reduction) which would consolidate population in larger villages. Due to this policy, neighboring community of Ilaya, including the present municipalities of Sibutad, Piñan, Rizal, Mutia and La Libertad was integrated to Pueblo de San Lorenzo.

The Recoletos laid down the town on a narrow plateau, beside the present site of the church. This area is accessible through a crude stairway (called Escalon) of carved river stones on the northwest side of the plateau. The 61-step Escalon, Spanish of "step", still exists until now. On the plateau, stumps of Molave posts can still be seen and according to Ilaya's history transmitted from generation to generation, one set of posts marked the site of a tribunal. The tribunal was built along Calle Espana, in an elevated hill at the eastern tip of Calle Real, in the poblacion area right above the top of the Escalon, facing the plaza. Beside the tribunal, is the location of a stone church.

The tribunal is an institution to determine claims or disputes. Within the tribunal was the office of the tax collector, which will remit collections to Cagayan de Misamis. The tribunal is also the home of the Jues de Paz (judicial officer). Juez de Paz, is the Justice of the Peace Court with the gobernadorcillo in the towns to hear petty cases. At the time all the judges and justices were appointed by the Governor-general upon the recommendation made by the audiencia (appellate court).

The gobernadorcillo or Kapitan municipal (starting 1796) position was merely honorary and therefore no salaries. It was enough that while in office they were much respected by their constituents. A kapitan municipal was elected by the incumbent and former gobernadorcillo, cabezas de barangay and other individuals of high status in the locality. The so – called viva voce election was usually held during a Gran Tribunal. Ilaya, unfortunately, was not able to preserve a record of those individuals who served as Kapitanes municipal during the Spanish regime. The only available short list however includes Juez de Paz Famorca and Ubaldo Dagpin and Kapitan Municipal Agustin "Osting" Quizo.

The pueblo de San Lorenzo became the Cabecera due to the construction of the San Lorenzo Church, situated at the hill and beside the tribunal. The church was the nucleus of each settlement complex and the community in which it was located was called Cabecera. Due to the importance of the Church in the Spanish Colonial Scheme, not only as a religious institution but as an economic and political force as well, it was to be expected that the population would gravitate toward the edifice that symbolized its power. Pueblo de San Lorenzo invariably became principal population center or poblacion during the Spanish era.

==== The Return of the Jesuits ====
In the year 1859, the Jesuit were allowed to go back and take over the Missions in Mindanao from the Recoletos. The Jesuits started the long process of taking back the Missions they established before suppression, but they only returned to Ilaya at the later part of the 1800s.

Ilaya was the last settlement that could be reached by boat that regularly plied the Dapitan River during this century. Jesuit priest Fr. Antonio Obach built a new church made of wood and nipa on the plateau not far from the church built by the Recollects, which may had been in disrepair.

In 1897, the church was transferred to the present site below the plateau at the request of Fr. Obach. The location of Ilaya, which is along the river, are constantly threatened with flooding. The people believed that the transfer of the church had caused the river, which often overflowed, to cease from threatening the town that grows on the foot of the plateau. The nearby lots were then purchased in favor of the church to give bigger space for the church's future expansion, with Crisanto Q. Cagbabanua as "sacristan mayor" and Padre Gil (an Augustinian missionary priest) as parish priest.

At this point, Ilaya had a thriving commercial activities and there were many Chinese businessmen engaging trade in the area. There were big stones owned by the Chinese and at the tip of Calle Santa Cruz where there was a market at the bank of the river while the residents, businessmen from Dapitan and the Subanos do their buying, selling and bartering of goods and agricultural products. Agricultural production increased particularly the production of abaca which became one of main products during this period.

=== American Period ===
On January 31, 1901, the American authorities reorganized the municipal government through Public Act 82, a general act for the organization of municipal governments in the Philippine Islands. Section 4 (b) of Public Act 82 states that Municipalities of less than 2 thousand inhabitants may be incorporated under the provisions of this Act, or may, upon petition signed by a majority of the qualified electors thereof be attached as a barrio to an adjacent and incorporated municipality. With the enactment of Public Act 82, Pueblo de San Lorenzo became a barrio of Ilaya under the municipality of Dapitan which is also under the province of Zamboanga.

== Demographics ==
Population census of Ilaya
Year	Pop.	±% p.a.
2010	2,653	—
2015	2,975	+2.21%
2020	2,873	−0.73%
2024	2,887	+0.12%
Source: Philippine Statistics Authority

== Geography ==
=== Land ===
Ilaya has a total land area of about 1,839.7522 hectares based on the data acquired from the City Local Government Unit. It has a total barangay road area of more or less 23 km., the longest barangay road in Dapitan City. The barangay is composed of a poblacion and nine (9) sitios, namely, Bangay, Pula-lupa, Nabucan, Bobonao, Lugdungan, Yabu, Payan, Kalatong, and Leop.

Ilaya is a Rural area and classified as an Agricultural land. It consists mainly of coconut land. Lowland production is mainly rice and corn. Many of the farmers are dependent on rainfall, others depend on irrigation for farming.

Ilaya is located 15.80 kilometers away from the City Proper. It is bounded by barangay Hilltop in the North; barangay Barcelona in the South; barangay Sto.Nino and San Miguel, Polanco, Zamboanga del Norte in the West and barangay Ba-ao in the east.

Most of the soil in the area is loam, which fertilizes the agricultural land that constitutes most of the land area.

=== Climate ===
The climate in the area is classified as type I. Heavy rainfall can be observed from the months of June to December, while the dry months can be observed from January to May. However, due to climate change, these may not be the situation. Ilaya experienced a big flood last November 13, 1973 and February 9, 2012.

=== Vegetation ===
Most of the community residents are engaged in horticulture production which is evident in almost all of the residences. Buwahan (lanzones) is also abundant and can be found in every yard. Almost every year, the lanzones in Ilaya will bear fruit and is harvested by Ilayanhons. The buwahan in Ilaya is very sweet and buyers would flock to get their share every season. Ilaya is popular in other parts of the country due to the sweetness of its buwahan.

The community is cultivating mostly coconut in the highlands and farm rice & corn in the lowland. Usually many of the farmers are dependent on rainfalls but most depend on the irrigation for farming. Community residents are also engaged in inter-cropping production.

== Transport ==
Ilaya is situated along the highway between Dipolog and Ozamiz cities. It can be reached in land by bus, jeepney or balik-balik, motorcab (tricycle), habal-habal (motorcycle) or through the river such as raft, pump boats, speed boats and motor boats.

The only way to cross the river when going to the poblacion from the national highway is the Ilaya steel bridge.

== Education ==
The literacy rate among the Ilayanhons is high. Children below five (5) years old studied at Ilaya Centro Day Care Center, Yabu Day Care Center, Bobonao Day Care Center and Lugdungan Day Care Center. There is also an Alternative Learning System (ALS), a house to house learning method conducted by the ALS Coordinator/mobile teacher and Abot-Alam Program, a learning extension program of the DepEd with an assigned mobile teacher.

There are also primary school, the Ilaya Elementary School, and secondary school, the Ilaya National High School.

== Public Establishments ==
=== Government Buildings ===
- Ilaya Barangay Hall
- Ilaya Basketball Court
- Ilaya Public Market

=== Schools ===
- Ilaya Elementary School
- Ilaya National High School
- Yabu Primary School

=== Religious Buildings ===
- San Lorenzo Catholic Church
- Ilaya Seventh-Day Adventist Church

=== Landmarks ===
- Ilaya Steel Bridge
- Ilaya Forever Standee
- Escalon
- Ilaya Tree Park

== Barangay Officials ==
Like all of the barangays in the Philippines, Ilaya is headed by elected officials, the topmost being the Punong Barangay or the Barangay Chairperson (addressed as Kapitan; also known as the Barangay Captain). The Kapitan is aided by the Sangguniang Barangay (Barangay Council) whose members, called Barangay Kagawad ("Councilors"), are also elected. The current Punong Barangay is Predemar D. Quizo.

=== Current Barangay Officials ===
Position	Name
Punong Barangay	Predemar D. Quizo
Barangay Kagawads	Bea Klariz E. Pardillo
Barangay Kagawads	Julius B. Elopre
Barangay Kagawads	Claubeth C. Bael
Barangay Kagawads	Ernesto B. Acoymo
Barangay Kagawads	Feliezer E. Duran
Barangay Kagawads	Enrico E. Estoque
Barangay Kagawads	Santiago S. Falconete Jr.

=== Past Barangay Officials ===
2016 - 2023
Barangay Captain	Predemar D. Quizo
Barangay Kagawad	Julius B. Elopre
Barangay Kagawad	Claubeth Bael
Barangay Kagawad	Paterno Tubil Jr.
Barangay Kagawad	Vicente Cagbabanua
Barangay Kagawad	Noel Eldian
Barangay Kagawad	Enrico Estoque.
Barangay Kagawad	Ernie Acoymo
Secretary	Bel A. Bael
Treasurer	Hermilo B. Rendon
SK Chairman	Johanna Marie E. Siao

2013 - 2016
Barangay Captain	Frisca D. Cagbabanua
Barangay Kagawad	Predemar D. Quizo
Barangay Kagawad	Jay G. Pardillo
Barangay Kagawad	Joel D. Bael
Barangay Kagawad	Ranil L. Magtuba
Barangay Kagawad	Noel M. Eldian
Barangay Kagawad	Paterno D. Tubil Jr.
Barangay Kagawad	Perla B. Ferrater
Secretary	Kristel Lian M. Manogura
Treasurer	Anna Leizel D. Bael

2010 - 2013
Barangay Captain	Frisca D. Cagbabanua
Barangay Kagawad	Predemar D. Quizo
Barangay Kagawad	Joel D. Bael
Barangay Kagawad	Jay G. Pardillo
Barangay Kagawad	Perla B. Ferrater
Barangay Kagawad	Ernesto B. Acoymo
Barangay Kagawad	Julius B. Elopre
Barangay Kagawad	Ranil L. Magtuba
Secretary	Kristel Lian I. Magbanua
Treasurer	Anna Leizel D. Bael
SK Chairman	Ana Cristabel M. Eldian

2007 - 2010
Barangay Captain	Frisca D. Cagbabanua
Barangay Kagawad	Gregorio M. Bael
Barangay Kagawad	Elvin M. Eldian
Barangay Kagawad	Hepher C. Bael
Barangay Kagawad	Joel D. Bael
Barangay Kagawad	Julius B. Elopre
Barangay Kagawad	Felizardo E. Hamoy
Barangay Kagawad	Jay G. Pardillo
Secretary	Ma. Marsha Fae Q. Cagbabanua
Treasurer	Elsie B. Caido
SK Chairman	Robert Van C. Eldian

2002 - 2007
Barangay Captain	Amado D. Rosal Sr.
Barangay Kagawad	Gregorio M. Bael
Barangay Kagawad	Hepher C. Bael
Barangay Kagawad	Julius B. Elopre
Barangay Kagawad	Felizardo E. Hamoy
Barangay Kagawad	Frisca D. Cagbabanua
Barangay Kagawad	Lino L. Desuacido
Barangay Kagawad	Elvin M. Eldian
Secretary	Jucit R. Cagbabanua
Treasurer	Elsie B. Caido
SK Chairman	Rupert Kilven D. Quizo

1997 - 2002
Barangay Captain	Norman Ireneo G. Amparado
Barangay Kagawad	Felizardo E. Hamoy
Barangay Kagawad	Juan T. Benitez
Barangay Kagawad	Frisca D. Cagbabanua
Barangay Kagawad	Firmo P. Elopre
Barangay Kagawad	Amado D. Rosal Sr.
Barangay Kagawad	Nerio G. Pardillo
Barangay Kagawad	Gregorio M. Bael
Secretary	Jose Lernie E. Baje
Treasurer	Virginia D. Navaja
SK Chairman	Julius B. Elopre

1994 - 1997
Barangay Captain	Norman Ireneo G. Amparado
Barangay Kagawad	Albina Q. Elumbaring
Barangay Kagawad	Gallardo Q. Cabilin
Barangay Kagawad	Amada E. Duran
Barangay Kagawad	Nerio G. Pardillo
Barangay Kagawad	Firmo P. Elopre
Barangay Kagawad	Clemente D. Bagor
Secretary	Roseller Cagbabanua
Treasurer	Victor I. Malacat
SK Chairman	Nonito A. Malacat

1989 - 1994
Barangay Captain	Norman Ireneo G. Amparado
Barangay Kagawad	Nerio G. Pardillo
Barangay Kagawad	Frisca D. Cagbabanua
Barangay Kagawad	Florentino D. Baje
Barangay Kagawad	Suez G. Quizo
Barangay Kagawad	Letecia A. Baje
Barangay Kagawad	Mamelio D. Lomogbad Sr.
Secretary	Danilo C. Tillano
Treasurer	Victor I. Malacat

1986 - 1989
Barangay Captain	Cesar C. Hamoy
Barangay Kagawad	Amada E. Duran
Barangay Kagawad	Felicisimo E. Quizo
Barangay Kagawad	Aurora Q. Calago
Barangay Kagawad	Florentino D. Baje
Barangay Kagawad	Conorito B. Dagpin
Secretary	Danilo C. Tillano
Treasurer	Beltran Siao

1982 - 1986
Barangay Captain	Icasio Quizo
Barangay Kagawad	Cesar C. Hamoy
Barangay Kagawad	Amada E. Duran
Barangay Kagawad	Felicisimo E. Quizo
Barangay Kagawad	Aurora Q. Calago
Barangay Kagawad	Florentino D. Baje
Barangay Kagawad	Conorito B. Dagpin
Barangay Kagawad	Florentino E. Magtuba

1976 - 1982
Barangay Captain	Icasio Quizo
Barangay Kagawad	Aurora Q. Calago
Barangay Kagawad	Benedecta Elumba
Barangay Kagawad	Maximo Elopre
Barangay Kagawad	Aoubaubi Dagpin
Barangay Kagawad	Luis Cagbabanua

1972 - 1976
Barrio Captain	Ambrosio Dagpin
Barrio Councilor	Icasio Quizo
	Maximino Elopre
	Alpiniano Dagpin
	Jacinto Engco
	Aurora Q. Calago
	Benedicta Elumba
Secretary	Vicente Cagbabanua
Treasurer	Cristuto P. Jakosalem

1968 - 1972
Barrio Captain	Tiburcio Gahum
Barrio Councilor	Icasio Quizo
	Tobias Galanido
	Bonifacio G. Jauculan
	Victor Malacat
	Jacinto Engco
	Aurora Q. Calago

1964 - 1968
Barrio Captain	Tiburcio Gahum
Barrio Councilor	Aurora Q. Calago
	Venancio Cagbabanua
	Angel Malacat
	Tito Dancalan
	Alejo Agayan
	Metodio Cabilin

1961 - 1964
Barrio Lieutenant	Patricio Eguia
Barrio Treasurer	Alfonso Baje
Barrio Councilor	Mariano Elumba
	Sotero Dagpin
	Suez Quizo
	Zenovio Cagbabanua
Vice Lieutenant	Ruperto Quizo
	Maximino Elopre
	Deogracios Dagpin
	Isaias Caido
	Alifio Dagaya
	Alejo Agayan
	Alfonso Dagpin
	Federico Elopre
	Tiburcio Gahum
	Nicodemus Paglalunan

== Gallery ==
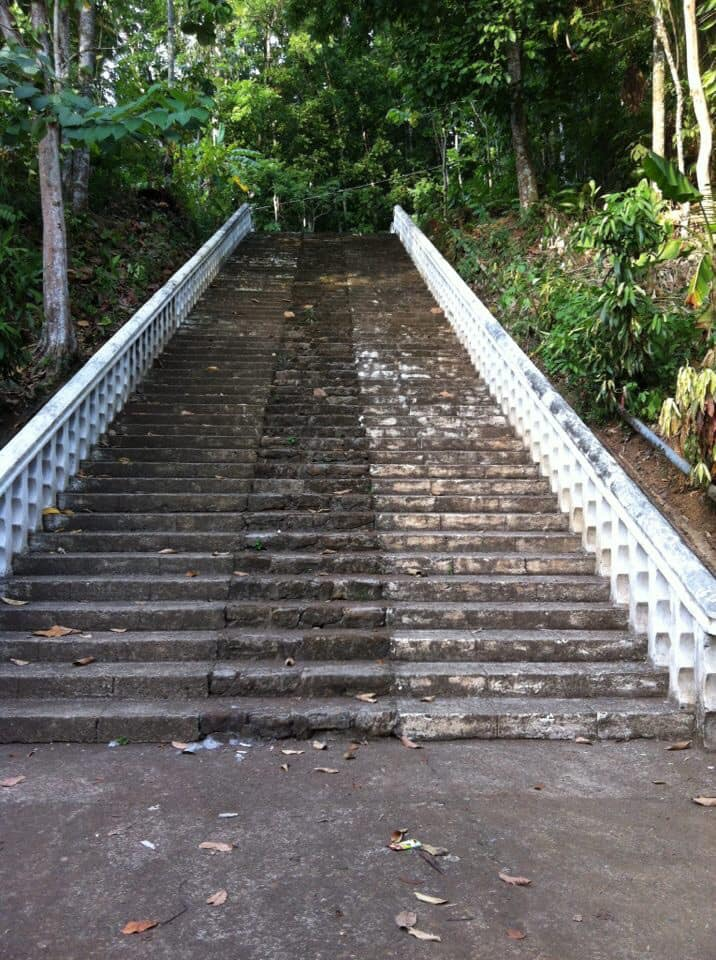
Escalon in Ilaya. By Norma Pardillo

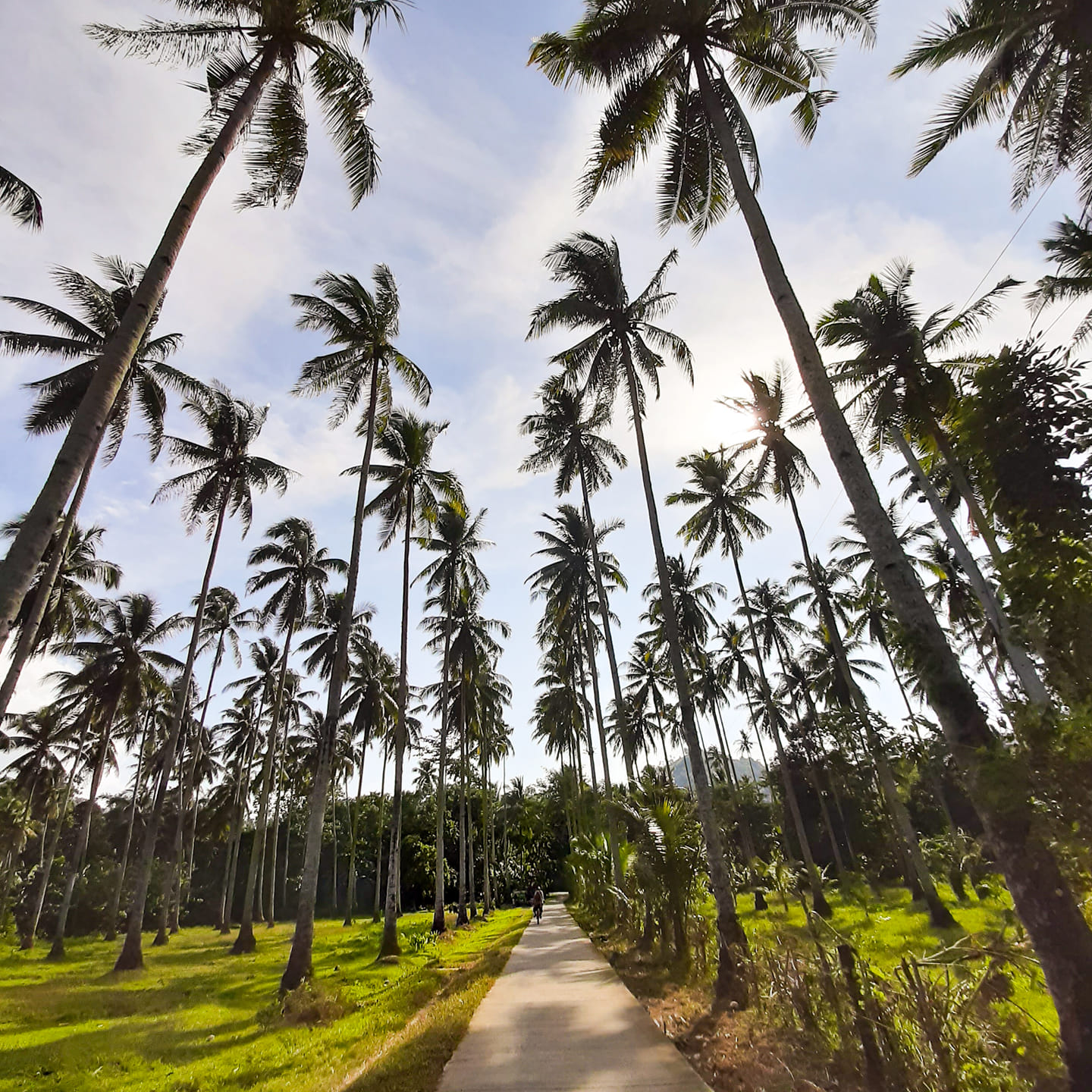
A street lined with coconut trees in sitio Bobonao, Ilaya. By Lendy Marie Balmores Lumbo.

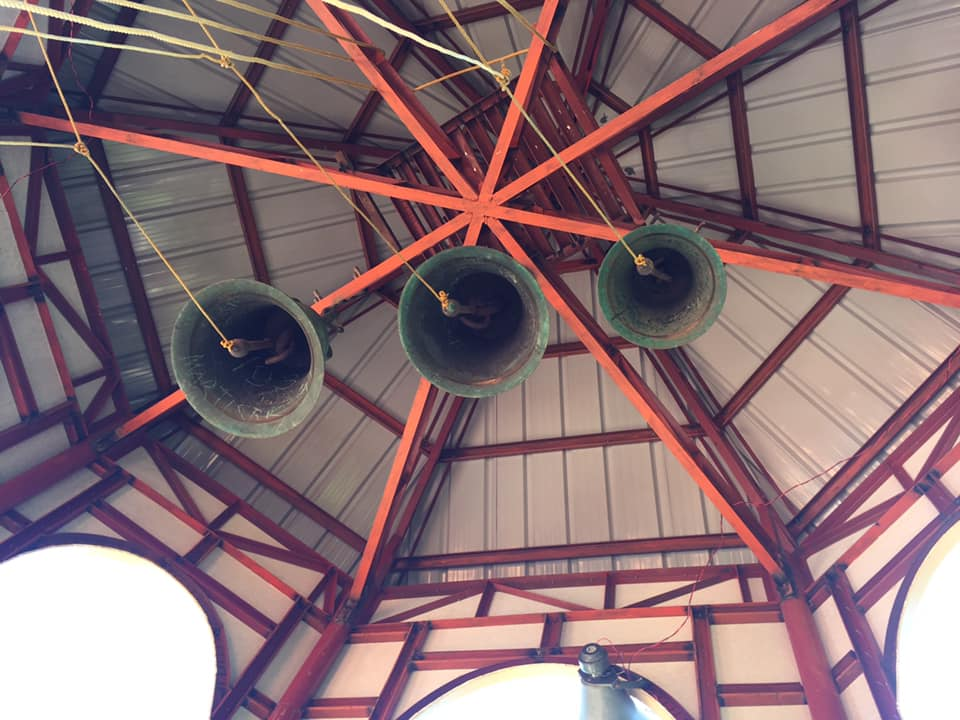
Century old church bells of San Lorenzo church of Ilaya. By Norma Pardillo.
