= Septimunicia =

Africa Proconsularis (125 AD)

Septimunicia (Italian: Settimunicia) is a titular bishopric of the Roman Catholic Church. The location is not certain, but assumed to be in Tunisia. Today Settimunicia survives as a titular bishopric and the current bishop is Emilio Bataclan, of Cebu.

== History ==
Septimunicia goes back to an earlier bishopric in the Roman province of Byzacena in the Sahel region of present-day Tunisia. The exact location of the seat of the bishopric is unknown but it was supposed to be at the foot of a high mountain called Burgaon, which appears to be a branch of the Dsaletus, Mount Uselet. The ruins of Oglet-El-Metnem or Henchir-El-Bliaa in modern Tunisia, have both been suggested as its site.

The only known bishop of this African diocese is Pascasio, who took part in the Council of Carthage called in 484 by King Huneric of the Vandal Kingdom, after which he was exiled like most Catholic bishops, unlike their Donatist heretical–schismatic counterparts.
