= Sibutad =

Municipality in Zamboanga del Norte, Philippines

- Municipality
- Municipality of Sibutad
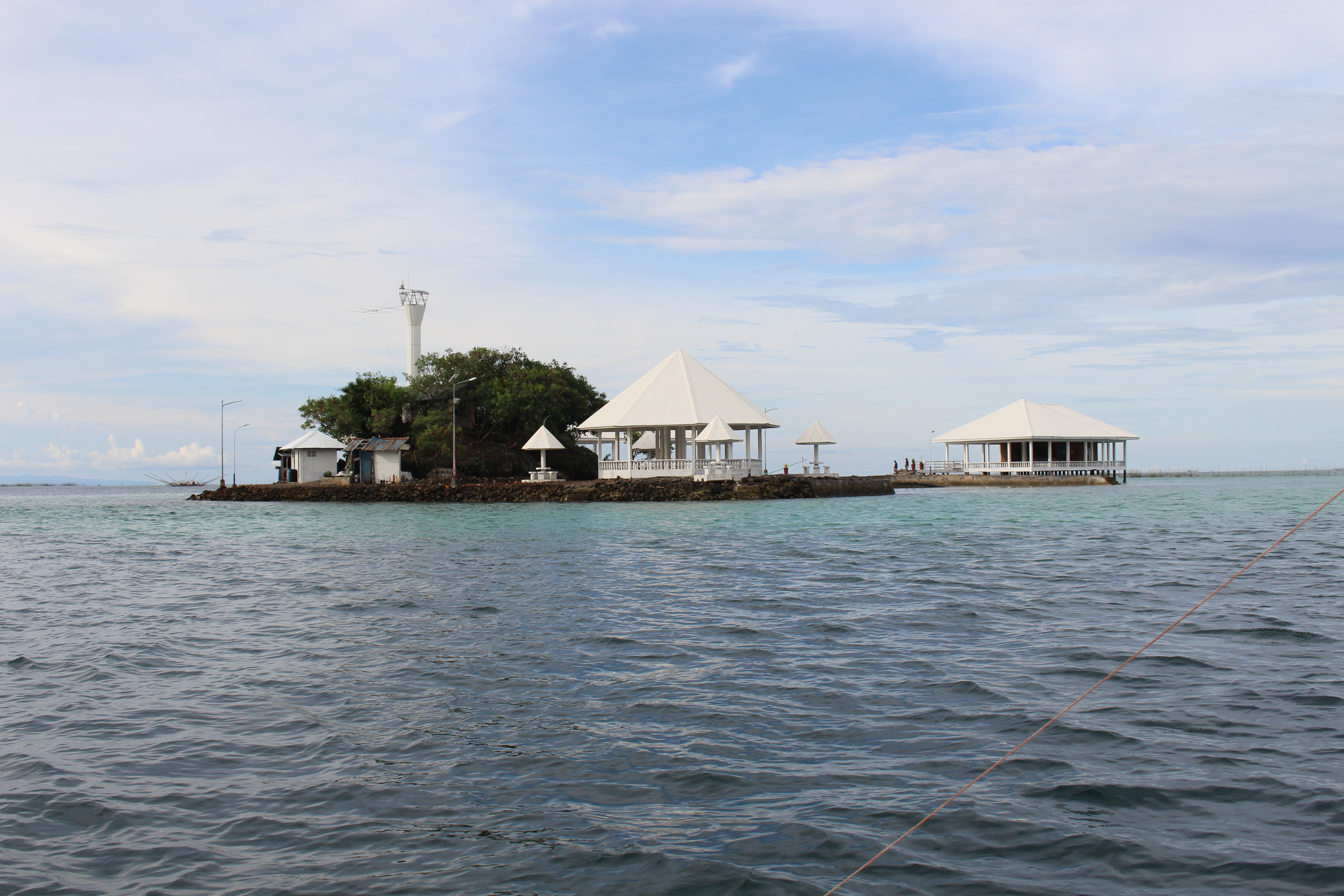
- Piñahon Island

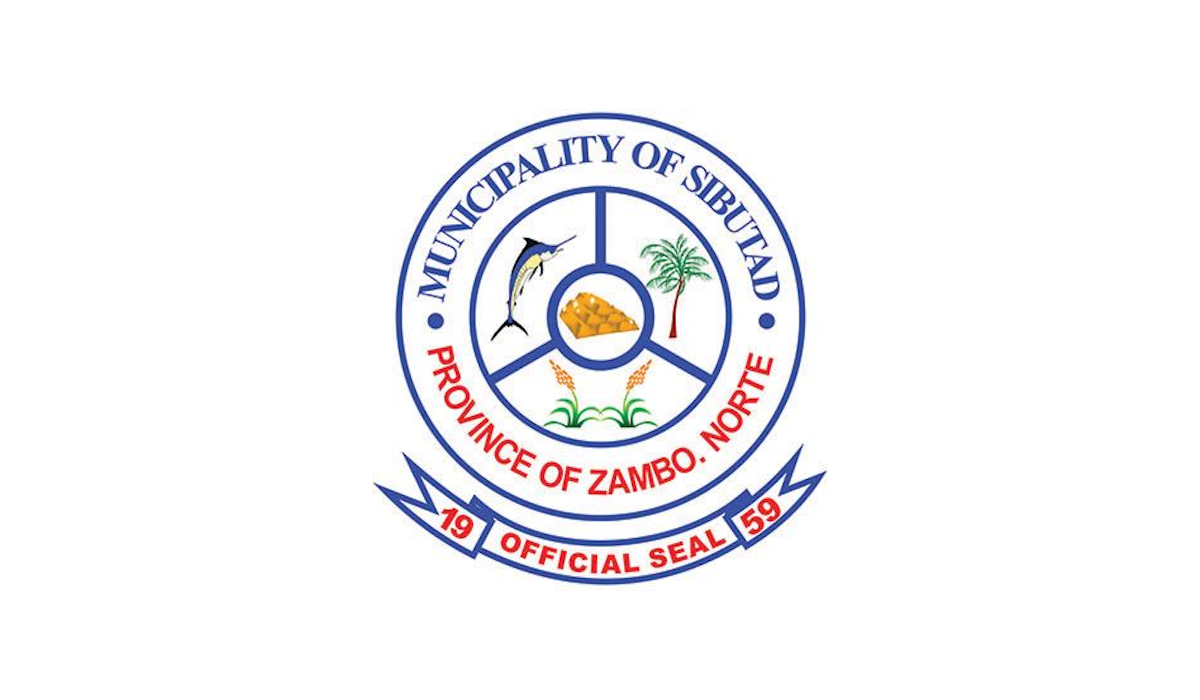
- Flag Seal
- Nickname: Mineral Premier Capital of Zamboanga Peninsula
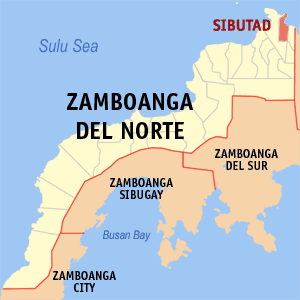
- Map of Zamboanga del Norte with Sibutad highlighted
- Interactive map of Sibutad
- Location within the Philippines
- Coordinates: 8°36′47″N 123°28′47″E
- Country: Philippines
- Region: Zamboanga Peninsula
- Province: Zamboanga del Norte
- District: 1st district
- Barangays: 16 (see Barangays)

Government
  - Type: Sangguniang Bayan
  - Mayor: Edilbrando B. Lagudas (Lakas)
  - Vice Mayor: Charnel Jade O. Batulan (Kusog Kalambuan)
  - Representative: Roberto T. Uy Jr. (Lakas)
  - Municipal Council: Members: Joseph B. Mejos; Alan D. Monarca; Kriza Mae D. Dizon; Jennifer T. Palpagan; Christine S. Baid; Isagani B. Embol; Miguel D. Lopez; Isagani B. Recamara
  - Electorate: 13,936 voters (2025)

Area
  - Total: 65.57 km^{2} (25.32 sq mi)
- Elevation: 123 m (404 ft)
- Highest elevation: 593 m (1,946 ft)
- Lowest elevation: 0 m (0 ft)

Population (2024 census)
  - Total: 18,199
  - Density: 277.6/km^{2} (718.9/sq mi)
  - Households: 4,762

Economy
  - Income class: 4th municipal income class
  - Poverty incidence: 40.78% (2023)
  - Revenue: ₱ 110.4 million (2024)
  - Assets: ₱ 386 million (2024)
  - Expenditure: ₱ 550.1 million (2024)
  - Liabilities: ₱ 136.5 million (2024)

Service provider
  - Electricity: Zamboanga del Norte Electric Cooperative (ZANECO)
- Time zone: UTC+8 (PST)
- ZIP code: 7103
- PSGC: 0907217000
- IDD : area code: +63 (0)65
- Native languages: Subanon; Cebuano; Tagalog
- Website: sibutad.zamboangadelnorte.com

Sibutad, officially the Municipality of Sibutad (Cebuano: Lungsod sa Sibutad; Subanen: Benwa Sibutad; Chavacano: Municipalidad de Sibutad; Tagalog: Bayan ng Sibutad), is a municipality in the province of Zamboanga del Norte, Philippines. According to the 2024 census, it has a population of 18,199 people.

== Geography ==
=== Barangays ===
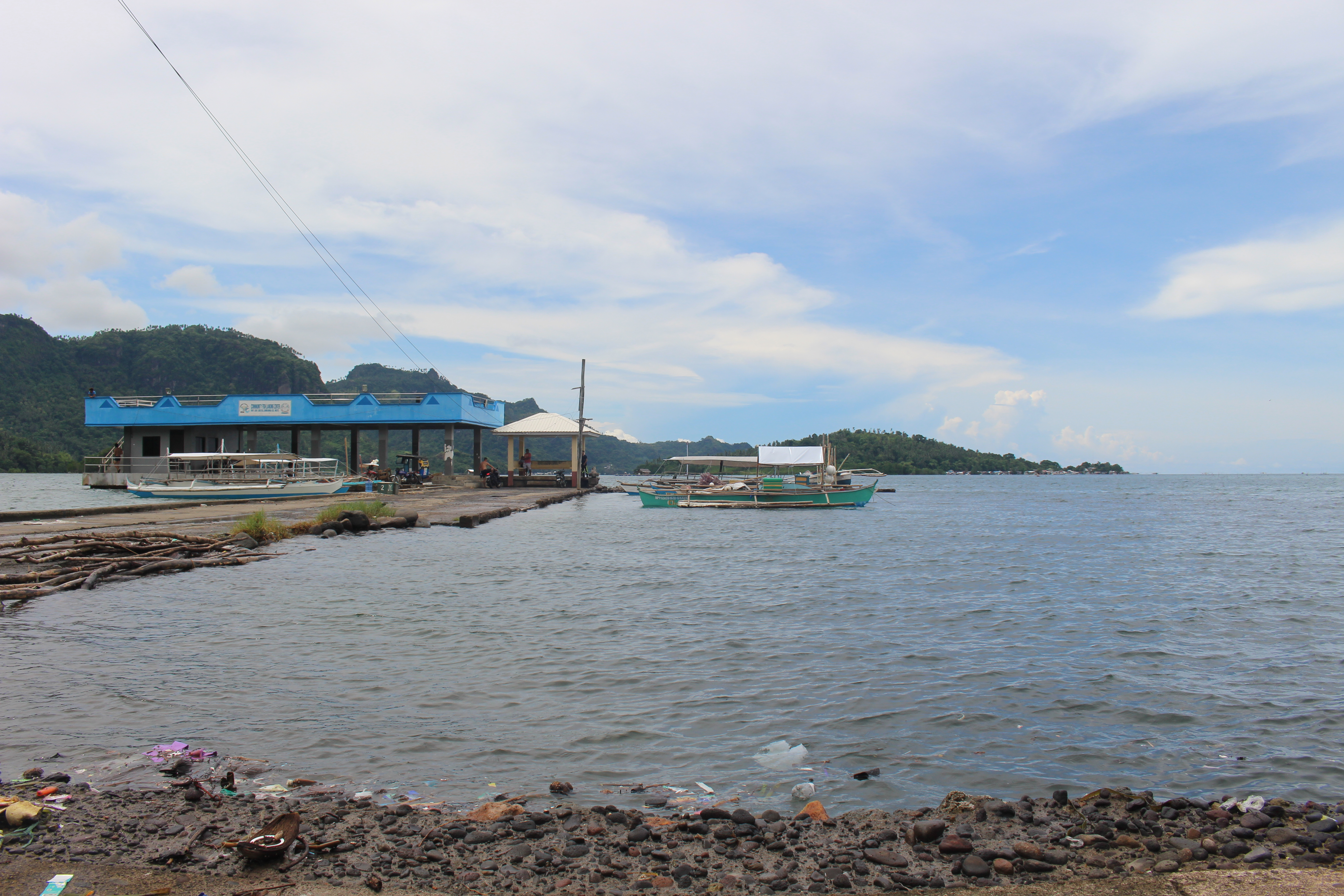
Libay Fish Port with Sinipay Island in the background

Sibutad is politically subdivided into 16 barangays. Each barangay consists of puroks while some have sitios.

- Bagacay
- Calilic
- Calube
- Delapa
- Kanim
- Libay
- Magsaysay
- Marapong
- Minlasag
- Oyan
- Panganuran
- Poblacion (Sibutad)
- Sawang
- Sibuloc
- Sinipay
- Sipaloc

=== Climate ===
Climate data for Sibutad, Zamboanga del Norte
Month	Jan	Feb	Mar	Apr	May	Jun	Jul	Aug	Sep	Oct	Nov	Dec	Year
Mean daily maximum °C (°F)	29 (84)	29 (84)	30 (86)	31 (88)	30 (86)	29 (84)	29 (84)	29 (84)	30 (86)	29 (84)	29 (84)	29 (84)	29 (85)
Mean daily minimum °C (°F)	23 (73)	23 (73)	23 (73)	23 (73)	24 (75)	24 (75)	24 (75)	24 (75)	24 (75)	24 (75)	24 (75)	23 (73)	24 (74)
Average precipitation mm (inches)	104 (4.1)	76 (3.0)	92 (3.6)	97 (3.8)	199 (7.8)	238 (9.4)	195 (7.7)	193 (7.6)	178 (7.0)	212 (8.3)	171 (6.7)	110 (4.3)	1,865 (73.3)
Average rainy days	14.7	12.5	15.8	17.5	27.6	28.5	29.0	27.5	26.9	27.9	23.5	18.2	269.6
Source: Meteoblue

== Demographics ==
Population census of Sibutad
Year	Pop.	±% p.a.
1960	7,420	—
1970	8,935	+1.87%
1975	10,888	+4.04%
1980	12,676	+3.09%
1990	16,279	+2.53%
1995	16,295	+0.02%
2000	15,635	−0.88%
2007	16,429	+0.69%
2010	16,783	+0.78%
2015	17,645	+0.96%
2020	17,453	−0.23%
2024	18,199	+1.01%
Source: Philippine Statistics Authority

== Economy ==
Poverty incidence of Sibutad (%)

Source: Philippine Statistics Authority

== Education ==
Sibutad has 15 schools, 13 of which are complete elementary schools and 2 are primary schools. All are in the Sibutad School District. Schools are:

- Bagacay Elementary School
- Bolicon Primary School
- Calilic Elementary School
- Calube Elementary School
- Delapa Elementary School
- Kanim Elementary School
- Libay Elementary School
- Magsaysay Elementary School
- Marapong Elementary School
- Minlasag Elementary School
- Oyan Elementary School
- Sibutad Central Elementary School
- Sawang Elementary School
- Sinipay Primary School
- Sipaloc Elementary School

Secondary schools of Sibutad:

- Sibutad National High School (located in Barangay Poblacion)
- Kanim National High School
- Sawang National High School

== Notable personalities ==
- Most Rev. Severo Caermare, D.D. (b. 1969) - bishop of Dipolog
