= Severo Caermare =

Filipino Catholic bishop (born 1969)

The Most Reverend Severo C. Caermare D.D.
- Bishop of Dipolog
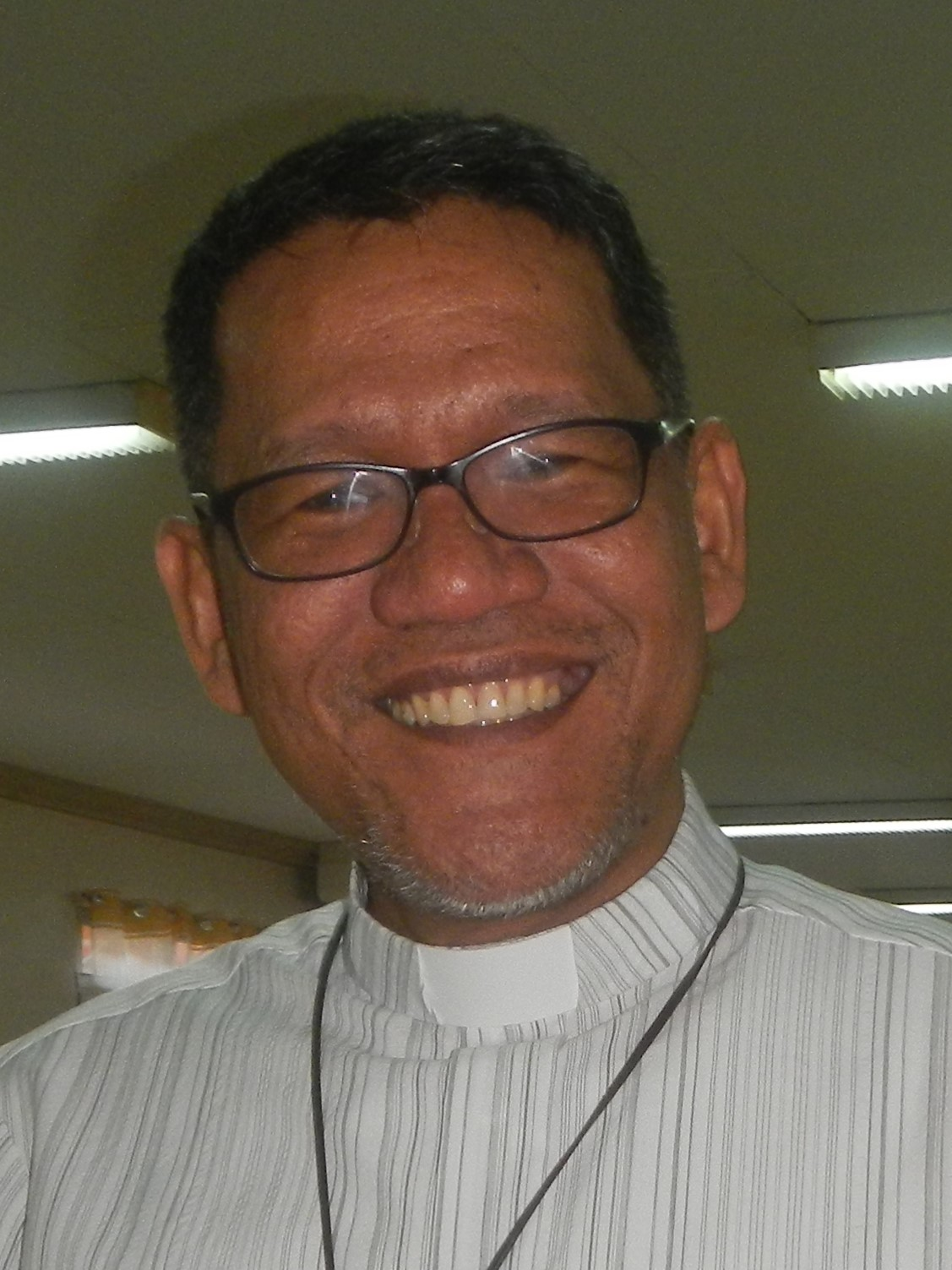
- Caermare in 2019
- Province: Ecclesiastical Province of Ozamis
- See: Dipolog
- Installed: 25 July 2014
- Predecessor: Jose R. Manguiran, D.D.
- Previous posts: Apostolic Administrator, Diocese of Iligan (2017–2019)

Orders
- Ordination: 12 April 1996 by Jose Manguiran
- Consecration: 30 October 2014 by Giuseppe Pinto

Personal details
- Born: Severo Cagatan Caermare; October 22, 1969 (age 56) Sibutad, Zamboanga del Norte, Philippines
- Denomination: Roman Catholicism
- Residence: Bishop's Residence, Sicayab, Dipolog City, Philippines
- Education: Cor Jesu Seminary; St. John Vianney Theological Seminary
- Motto: Benedicam dominum semper (I will bless the Lord always)
- Coat of arms

Severo Cagatan Caermare (born October 22, 1969) is a Filipino prelate of the Roman Catholic Church. He is the Bishop of the Diocese of Dipolog in the Philippines.

== Background ==
Styles of Severo C. Caermare
- Reference style: The Most Reverend
- Spoken style: Your Excellency
- Religious style: Bishop

Caermare was born on October 22, 1969, in Sibutad, Zamboanga del Norte, Philippines. He attended Cor Jesu Seminary in Dipolog, Zamboanga del Norte, Philippines and St. John Vianney Theological Seminary in Cagayan de Oro. He attained his degree in theology from Cor Jesu Seminary in Dipolog, Philippines.

== Ministry ==
=== Sacerdotal ===
Caermare was ordained as priest on April 22, 1996, at Saint Anne Parish in his hometown of Sibutad, Zamboanga del Norte. As priest, Caermare spent most of his pastoral work in parishes. He also lectured in seminaries.

Position	Term of Office	Organization
Administrator	1996–1997	Our Mother of Perpetual Help Parish, Godod, Zamboanga del Norte
Formator; Professor; Vocation Director; Procurator; Spiritual Director; Diocesan Liturgist	1997–2000	Cor Jesu Seminary, Dipolog
Administrator	2002–2003	Saint Isidore Parish, Gutalac, Zamboanga del Norte
Formator; Professor; Liturgist	2003–2004	Saint Mary's Theologate Seminary, Ozamiz City
Rector; Professor; Liturgist	2004–2006	Cor Jesu Seminary, Dipolog
Formator; Dean of Studies; Professor	2006–2007	Saint Mary's Theologate Seminary, Ozamiz City
Rector; Professor	2007–2013	Saint Mary's Theologate Seminary, Ozamiz City
Parish Administrator	2013–2014	San Antonio de Padua Parish, Gulayon, Dipolog

=== Episcopal ===
Pope Francis appointed Caermare to be the 3rd Bishop of the Diocese of Dipolog on July 25, 2014, and was ordained on October 30, 2014, in the Cathedral of Our Lady of the Most Holy Rosary in Dipolog with Apostolic Nuncio to the Philippines Giuseppe Pinto as the Principal Consecrator, Bishop Jose Cabantan of Diocese of Malaybalay and Bishop Emeritus Jose Manguiran of Dipolog as Principal Co-Consecrators. Because of this, Caermare became the first bishop from the Diocese of Dipolog where he was ordained.

On December 6, 2017, after the passing of Iligan bishop Elenito Galido, Pope Francis appointed Caermare as Apostolic Administrator for the Diocese of Iligan until September 5, 2019, after the appointment of Bishop Jose Rapadas III.

Caermare (vice chairman of ECLA) assumed the two-year term chairmanship of the Catholic Bishops' Conference of the Philippines – Episcopal Commission on the Laity (ECLA) from December 15, 2023 succeeding the late Bishop Enrique Macaraeg Tarlac.

Caermare ("Sulat Pamahayag" 14 January 2024 on "ongoing signature gathering wherein money was offered to the voters") and his hundred priests of the Diocese of Dipolog said that "a people’s initiative not coming from the people and without prior consultation may only end up favoring a few interests." He echoes Broderick Pabillo's call: "reject the ongoing signature campaign pushing for charter change through a people's initiative xxx the campaign offers money in exchange for their signatures."

Catholic Church titles
Preceded by Jose R. Manguiran	Bishop of Dipolog; 2014-Present	Incumbent
Preceded by Elenito R. Galido	Apostolic Administrator of Iligan; 2017-2019	Succeeded by Jose R. Rapadas III
