= Emilio Bataclan =

Filipino Roman Catholic prelate (1940–2026)

The Most Reverend Emilio Layon Bataclan
- Auxiliary Bishop Emeritus of Cebu
- Church: Catholic Church; Latin Church
- Archdiocese: Cebu
- Appointed: 21 June 2004
- Installed: 21 June 2004
- Term ended: 1 October 2015
- Other post: Titular Bishop of Septimunicia (2004–2026)
- Previous posts: Auxiliary Bishop of Cebu and Titular Bishop of Gunela (1990–1995); Bishop of Iligan (1995–2004)

Orders
- Ordination: 1 May 1966 by Bruno Torpigliani
- Consecration: 19 April 1990 by Ricardo Vidal, Leopoldo Tumulak and Camilo Diaz Gregorio

Personal details
- Born: Emilio Layon Bataclan; 20 September 1940 Bantayan, Cebu, Commonwealth of the Philippines
- Died: 24 June 2026 (aged 85) Cebu City, Philippines
- Residence: San Remigio, Cebu
- Education: San Carlos Minor Seminary; Seminario Mayor de San Carlos; University of San Carlos; East Asian Pastoral Institute, Ateneo de Manila
- Motto: Fieri Pescator Hominum
- Coat of arms: Emilio Layon Bataclan's coat of arms

Styles of Emilio L. Bataclan
- Reference style: The Most Reverend
- Spoken style: Your Excellency
- Religious style: Bishop

Ordination history of Emilio Bataclan
History
Priestly ordination
- Ordained by: Bruno Torpigliani
Episcopal consecration
- Principal consecrator: Ricardo Vidal
- Co-consecrators: Leopoldo Sumaylo Tumulak, Camilo Diaz Gregorio

Emilio Layon Bataclan (20 September 1940 – 24 June 2026) was a Filipino prelate of the Catholic Church in the Philippines. He was an auxiliary bishop emeritus of the Latin Church archdiocese of Cebu. Having been the first bishop from Bantayan, Cebu followed by Archbishop John F. Du, he resigned as auxiliary bishop of Cebu on 1 October 2015 after serving the archdiocese for more than 11 years becoming an auxiliary bishop emeritus of Cebu. In between his two stints in Cebu, he was Suffragan Bishop of Iligan. His last post was from the parish of San Fernando el Rey in Liloan, Cebu. He also worked with Archbishop Teofilo Camomot when they were assigned both as priests to the Parish of Saint Thomas of Villanova in El Pardo, Cebu City.

== Biography ==
Emilio Bataclan was born on 20 September 1940 in Bantayan, Cebu. He was ordained priest on 1 May 1966 in the Cebu Metropolitan Cathedral. From 1972 to 1995, he served as parish priest of Daanbantayan, Bantayan Island, Alang-Alang, Mandaue, Bogo and San Nicolas. He was appointed Auxiliary Bishop of Cebu and was consecrated on 19 April 1990 in the Cebu Metropolitan Cathedral by Cardinal Ricardo Vidal, Archbishop of Cebu. He was also appointed bishop of Iligan and titular bishop of Septimunicia and Gunela. He was appointed again to be the auxiliary bishop of Cebu on 21 June 2004. He resigned as auxiliary bishop of Cebu on 1 October 2015 for medical reasons after passing the mandatory age of retirement at 75.

He lived in his retirement house in San Remigio, Cebu.

== Career ==
Emilio Bataclan felt the call to priesthood. He traveled from his native home to Cebu City to study Theology in the Seminario Mayor de San Carlos. He was ordained a priest on 1 May 1966. His first assignment as priest was to the Parish of Saints Peter and Paul in his hometown, Bantayan Island. He was appointed by Pope St. John Paul II, to be the auxiliary bishop of Cebu. He gladly accepted it. He was consecrated as bishop on 19 April 1990, by Ricardo Cardinal Vidal, he was appointed Titular Bishop of Gunela. He served the archdiocese before he was transferred as Bishop of Iligan. In 2004, he was then appointed again by Pope St. John Paul II as the auxiliary bishop of Cebu for the second time, on 21 June 2004, as Titular Bishop of Septimunicia.

== Retirement ==
After 11 years as auxiliary bishop of Cebu, he resigned in 2015 upon reaching the mandatory age of retirement at 75. He celebrated his retirement mass at the Cebu Metropolitan Cathedral on 1 October 2015 at 4:00 PM (Philippine Time). He lived in his retirement house in San Remigio, Cebu.

Following the death of Vidal, whom he had served as auxiliary bishop, on 18 October 2017 he celebrated the third requiem mass at the Cebu Metropolitan Cathedral.

== Death ==
Bataclan died at a hospital in Cebu City, on 24 June 2026, due to a heart attack while he was recovering from a leg amputation brought about by complications from diabetes. He was 85.

Catholic Church titles
Preceded by Basílio do Nascimento	Titular Bishop of Septimunicia; 2004–2026	Succeeded by Vacant
Preceded by Fernando Capalla	Bishop of Iligan; 1995–2004	Succeeded by Elenito Galido
Preceded by Pierre Plateau	Titular Bishop of Gunela; 1990–1995	Succeeded by Christophe Pierre
Preceded by —	Auxiliary Bishop of Cebu; 1990–1995, 2004–2015	Succeeded by —
