= Elenito Galido =

The Most Reverend Elenito R. Galido, D.D.
- Bishop of Iligan
- Diocese: Iligan
- Appointed: March 25, 2006
- Installed: September 8, 2006
- Term ended: December 5, 2017
- Predecessor: Emilio L. Bataclan
- Successor: Joey Rapadas III

Orders
- Ordination: April 25, 1979
- Consecration: September 8, 2006

Personal details
- Born: Elenito delos Reyes Galido; April 18, 1954 Managok, Malaybalay City
- Died: December 5, 2017 (aged 63) Iligan City
- Buried: Iligan Cathedral
- Denomination: Roman Catholic
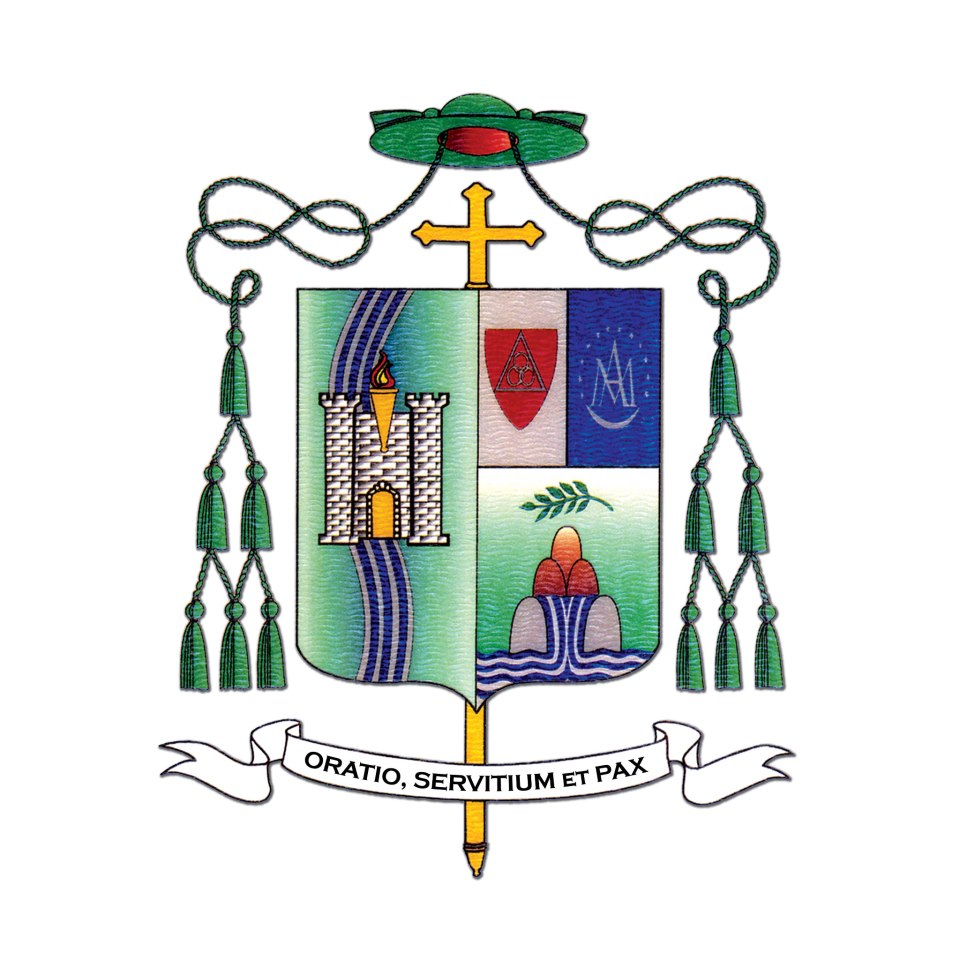
- Coat of arms

Styles of Elenito R. Galido
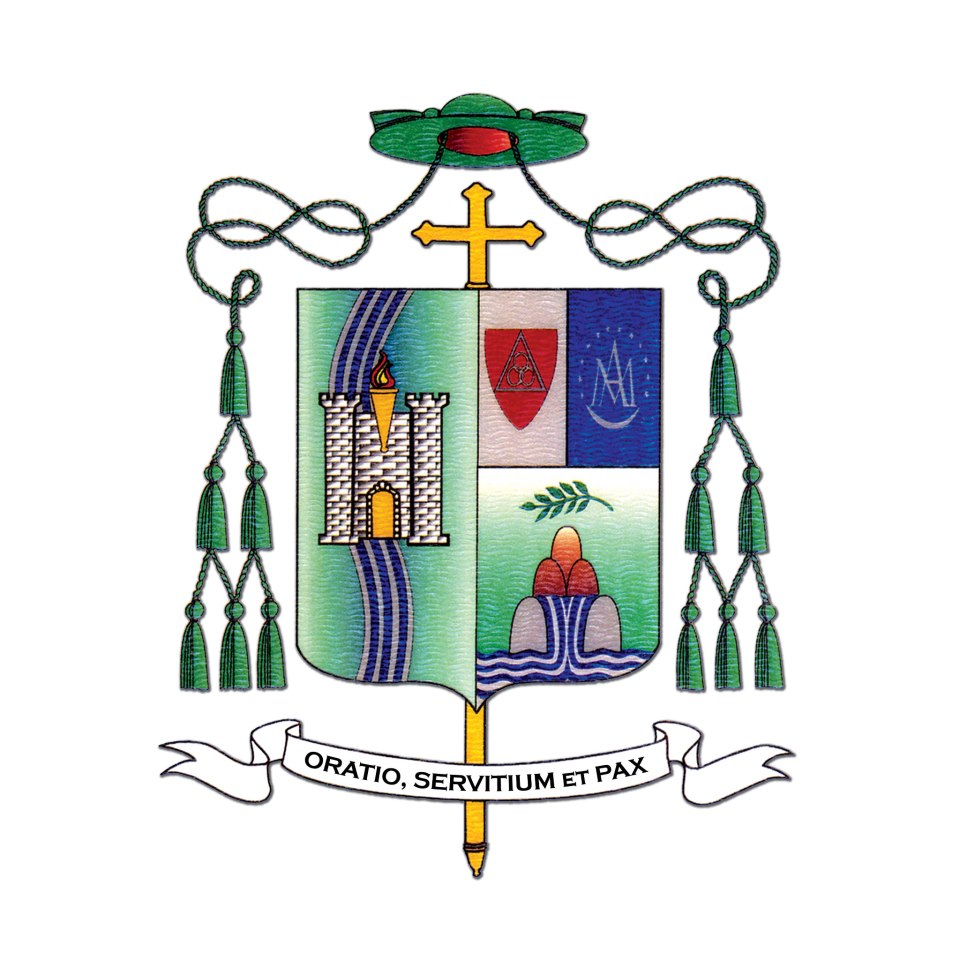
- Reference style: The Most Reverend
- Spoken style: Your Excellency
- Religious style: Monsignor

Elenito delos Reyes Galido (April 18, 1954; Malaybalay City, Bukidnon – December 5, 2017) was a Filipino bishop of the Roman Catholic Diocese of Iligan, an ecclesiastical jurisdiction covering the whole province of Lanao del Norte and the city of Iligan in the Philippines.

== Biography ==
Galido was born in Managok, Malaybalay City, Bukidnon on April 18, 1954. His sacerdotal ordination was on April 25, 1979. He first served under the Diocese of Malaybalay. He was appointed the fourth bishop of the Diocese of Iligan on March 25, 2006, consecrated on September 8, 2006.

Before becoming a Bishop, he served the Malaybalay Diocese as its Vicar General, Administrator of Cathedral parish, Rector of the Minor Seminary and parish priest of Kibawe, Bukidnon.

Galido was a known environmentalist. In late 1980s, he started his own reforestation project in Mt. Capistrano, Managok, Malaybalay City, Bukidnon. He mobilized the kaingin farmers of Managok to plant more trees in the watershed areas.

After his appointment as Bishop of Diocese of Iligan he influenced his relatives in Managok especially his nephew Valencia City Assessor Arnold “nonoy” Rendon Azucena to build a new church. Hence, a new chapel of Saint Blaise in Purok 1, Managok, Malaybalay City has been built.

Bishop Galido was a chairman of the Episcopal Commission on Culture (ECC) of the Catholic Bishops' Conference of the Philippines (CBCP). He is the cousin of Philippine Army Commanding General, Lt. Gen. Roy M. Galido and a nephew of Former Solcom Commander, Retired Brig. Gen. Alejendro A. Galido.

He died at 10:11 pm on December 5, 2017.

== See also ==
- Catholic Church in the Philippines
