= Dipolog Cathedral =

Roman Catholic church in Zamboanga del Norte, Philippines

- Our Lady of the Most Holy Rosary Cathedral Parish
- Santo Rosario Cathedral
- Katedral sa Balaang Birhen sa Santo Rosario (Cebuano); Parokyang Katedral ng Mahal na Birhen ng Kasanto-santuhang Rosaryo (Filipino); Parroquia Catedral de Nuestra Señora del Rosario (Spanish)
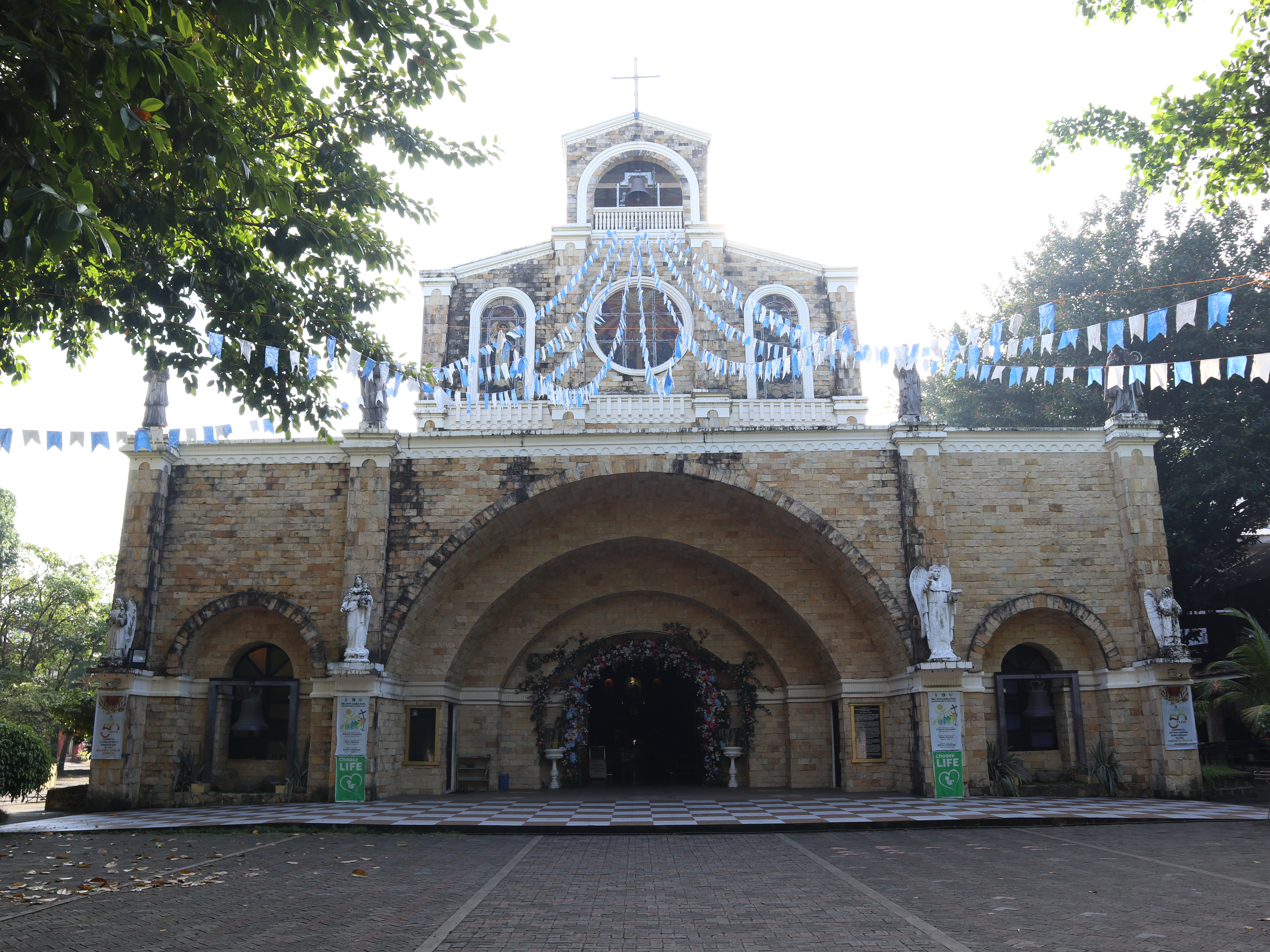
- Cathedral facade in 2023
- Dipolog Cathedral
- 8.586002°N 123.345736°E
- Location: Dipolog, Zamboanga del Norte
- Country: Philippines
- Language(s): Cebuano, English
- Denomination: Roman Catholic

History
- Status: Cathedral
- Founded: 1896
- Dedication: Our Lady of the Most Holy Rosary

Architecture
- Functional status: Active
- Architectural type: Church building
- Style: Eclectic

Administration
- Archdiocese: Ozamis
- Diocese: Dipolog

Clergy
- Bishop: Severo Caermare
- Vicars: Enrico Montano; Isagani Josol; Rafael Licong; Jotham Pilayre

Our Lady of the Most Holy Rosary Cathedral Parish, commonly known as Dipolog Cathedral, is a Roman Catholic church located in Estaka, Dipolog, Zamboanga del Norte in the Philippines. The cathedral is the seat of the Diocese of Dipolog.

== History ==
Dipolog Cathedral

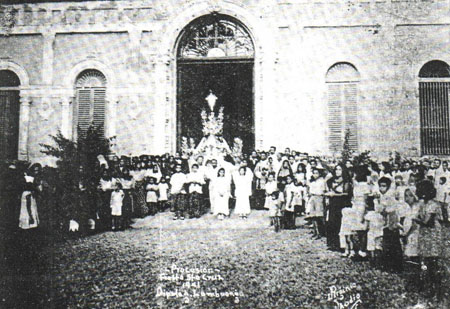
Parishioners fronting the early church facadé in the late 19th-century.

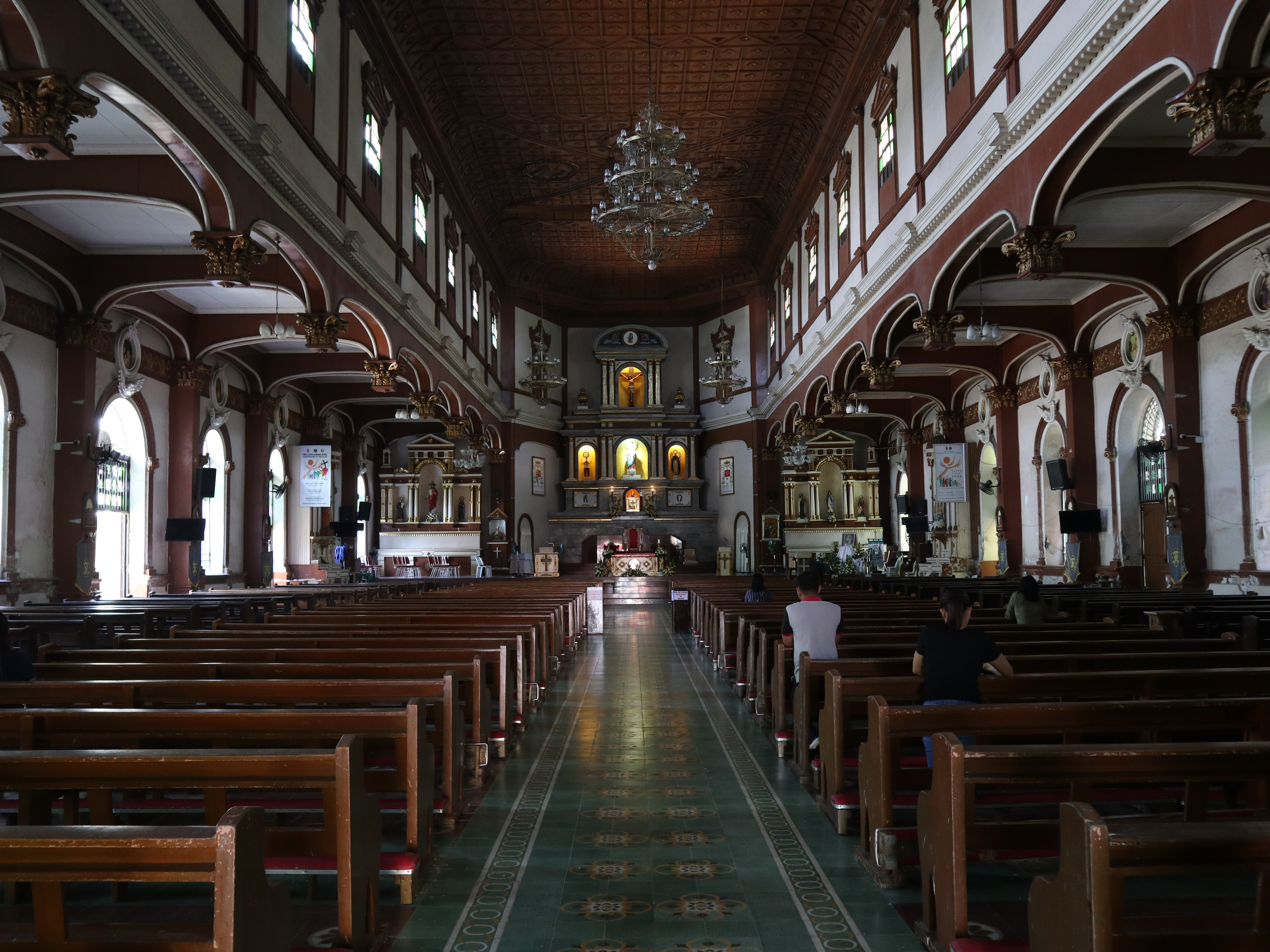
The cathedral interior in 2023 featuring its ceiling made of narra.

Dipolog was formerly a barrio of Dapitan. In April 1894, the construction of the church of Dipolog was begun while the first Mass within the completed church was held in June 1894. The parish of Dipolog was founded on June 30, 1896 with Fr. Esteban Yepes, a Jesuit, serving as its first parish priest. The first church altar of Dipolog was designed by José Rizal while he was exiled in Dapitan. The features of the church are its wooden ceiling, wooden bas relief of the Four Evangelists, massive adobe stone walls, and reredoses, among others. In 1913, Dipolog formally became a separate town from Dapitan. The church became a cathedral when the Diocese of Dipolog was canonically founded in 1967. Reforms brought by the Second Vatican Council changed the church's reredos into a simple one with vertical design and a central bell tower being added to the façade. In 1986, the nave's main columns were removed under the helm of Msgr. Salvador Mora. As part of centennial anniversary of Dipolog's parish foundation in 1996, the cathedral's main reredos was restored with carved marble under Msgr. Esteban Gaudicos. Bishop Jose Manguiran, Dipolog's second bishop, led the cathedral interior renovation in 2007, the original walls restoration in 2008, and the 2009 renovation of the façade. Then Manila cardinal-archbishop Gaudencio Rosales led the blessing of the renovated façade in May 2009.

=== Present day ===
In 2021, the cathedral was designated as one of the 500 Jubilee Churches as part of the activities for the quincentennial of Philippine Christianity.
