= Diocese of Dipolog =

Latin Catholic diocese in the Philippines

Diocese of Dipolog Dioecesis Dipologanae Diyosesis sa Dipolog Diyosesis ng Dipolog

Catholic
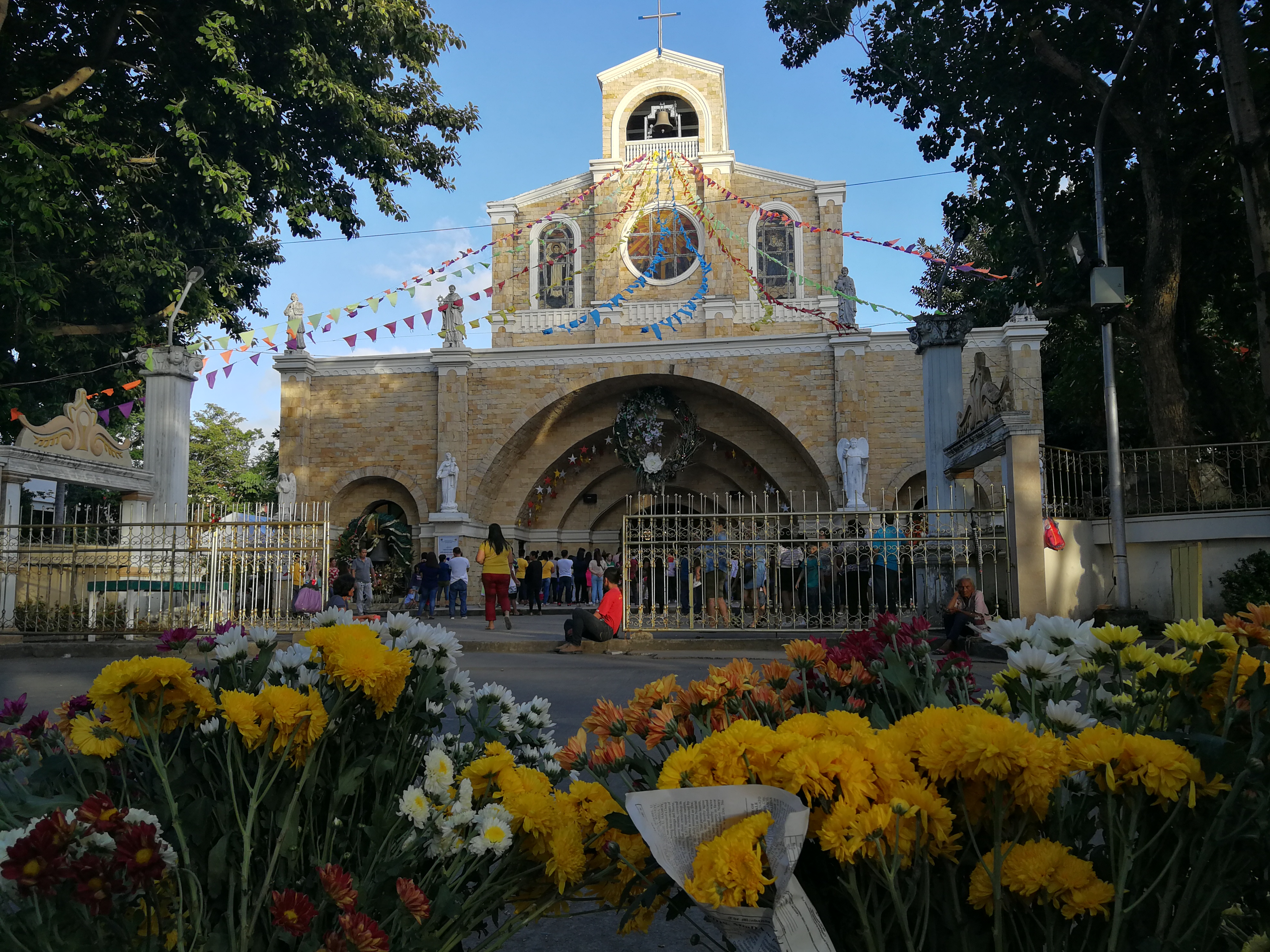
- Dipolog Cathedral

- Coat of arms

Location
- Country: Philippines
- Territory: Zamboanga del Norte
- Ecclesiastical province: Ozamis
- Coordinates: 8.5861°N 123.3455°E

Statistics
- Area: 7,205 km^{2} (2,782 sq mi)
- Population: Total; Catholics: (as of 2021); 1,070,000; 758,000 (70.8%)
- Parishes: 38
- Schools: 5

Information
- Denomination: Catholic Church
- Sui iuris church: Latin Church
- Rite: Roman Rite
- Established: 31 July 1967
- Cathedral: Cathedral of Our Lady of the Holy Rosary
- Titular patrons: Our Lady of the Most Holy Rosary; Saint Vincent Ferrer
- Secular priests: 93

Current leadership
- Pope: Leo XIV
- Bishop: Severo Cagatan Caermare
- Metropolitan Archbishop: Martin Jumoad
- Vicar General: Joel S. Montederamos
- Bishops emeritus: Jose R. Manguiran
- All current statistics are based on updated data taken by Catholic-Hierarchy.org.

The Diocese of Dipolog (Latin: Dioecesis Dipologanae; Filipino: Diyosesis ng Dipolog; Cebuano: Diyosesis sa Dipolog; Spanish: Diócesis de Dipolog) is a Latin Church of the Catholic Church in the Philippines which comprises the civil province of Zamboanga del Norte. Erected in 1967 from the territory of the Archdiocese of Zamboanga, the diocese serves as a suffragan to the Archdiocese of Ozamis.

The seat of the diocese is the Cathedral of Our Lady of the Most Holy Rosary which is located at the center of the city of Dipolog of Zamboanga del Norte. The diocese celebrated its fiftieth anniversary in 2017. Since its creation the diocese has had three bishops. The current bishop is Severo Cagatan Caermare, the first native of the diocese to become its bishop.

Former coat of arms of the Diocese of Dipolog used until 2014. The three roses symbolize the patroness of the diocese, and the cathedral above wavy lines connotes the origin of the name Dipolog (across the river).

== History ==
=== The Jesuit missionaries' efforts ===
In 1598, the Jesuits already belonged to the areas given to the Diocese of Cebu when the Philippines was divided among the four religious congregations. Visayas and Mindanao were under the Diocese of Cebu’s jurisdiction at that time.

The Spanish naval force, sent to explore, conquer, and colonize, brought with them the missionaries of the Society of Jesus (Jesuits) in their endeavors in Mindanao. The Jesuit mission reached Dapitan in 1609 during the brief stay of Juan Juárez Gallinato’s squadron after recently defeating the Manguindanau Muslims nearby, while the terms of surrender pertaining to the recent battle were being negotiated. This opened the opportunity for Fr. Pascual de Acuña, the Jesuit chaplain of the squadron, to do his missionary work among the residents and the surrounding tribes. After the Muslims managed to escape within two months, it was believed that Fr. Acuña converted 200 natives to Christianity in two months’ worth of endeavors. Two of the converts were Manook—the son of Dapitan’s founder, Datu Pagbuaya—and his daughter, Uray. They were baptized as Don Pedro Manook and Doña María Uray.

Twenty years later, in 1629, Fr. Pedro Gutierrez, SJ, founded the mission center in Dapitan. Allegedly, between 1631 and 1767, the first church and Mission House (convent) were built, further executing the Jesuits’ mission. During this period, the Jesuits were sent to neighboring barrios and sitios, which, in the vicinity, included Dipolog. As a permanent mission station of the Jesuits, Dapitan covered areas as far as Iligan, Lubungan (now Katipunan), Layaun, Ilaya, Dipolog, Dicayo, Duhinob, Manukan, Sián, Sindangan, Mucas, and Quipit. These places were the visitas (mission chapels) of the Jesuit missionaries.

=== The Augustinians' period ===
Things were going well for the Society of Jesus; however, in 1767, King Charles III of Spain signed the Pragmática Sanción ordering the expulsion of Jesuits from all Spanish territories. The decree was fully implemented by 1768, resulting in the deportation of all Jesuits from the Philippines. This paved the way for the Augustinian missionaries to assume ecclesiastical administration of Dapitan, Dipolog, and Lubungan in 1769. The pioneering Augustinians of these mission areas were under the administration of Fray Bernardo Cases de Santa Teresa.

During the Augustinians’ stay, Lubungan was established as a parish under St. Francis Xavier’s patronage, taking Dipolog under its jurisdiction in 1796. In 1811, the Parish of St. James the Greater in Dapitan was canonically erected under Fray Bernardo Cases de Santa Teresa, OAR. In 1834, the visita (mission chapel) of Dipolog, under the patronage of Our Lady of the Most Holy Rosary, was completed.

=== The return of the Society of Jesus ===
In 1859, the Jesuits were allowed to return to the Philippines, replacing the Augustinians and resuming their mission over their former areas. The Jesuits' tenure in Dapitan, Dipolog, and Lubungan lasted a considerable time (1860s until mid-20th century) before they were replaced by secular priests. Through the Jesuits’ efforts the second time around, the mission areas assigned to them flourished further as Christian communities.

During the time of Fr. Eusebio Barrado, SJ, as parish priest of Lubungan, the church of Dipolog (formerly a chapel) completed its preparation to become a parish in 1894. Through the order of the Bishopric of Cebu, Dipolog was canonically erected as a parish on June 30, 1896, with Rev. Fr. Esteban de Yepes, SJ, installed as its first pastor, separating from its mother parish, Lubungan.

=== The advent of the Diocese of Dipolog ===
The entire island of Mindanao was under the jurisdiction of the Dioceses of Cebu and Jaro from 1607 to 1910. On April 10, 1910, Pope Pius X created the Diocese of Zamboanga as a suffragan of the Archdiocese of Manila, along with three other episcopal sees: Lipa, Calbayog, and Tuguegarao. Ecclesiastical authority over the Zamboanga Peninsula then transferred to the new Diocese of Zamboanga.

Parishes erected under the Diocese of Zamboanga included:

- Sindangan (1936)
- Labason (1941)
- Polanco (1945)
- Rizal (1950)
- Siocon (1951)
- Manukan (1952)
- Liloy and Ilaya (1957)

On May 15, 1958, Pope Pius XII elevated Zamboanga to an archdiocese. Subsequently, the parish of Salug (1960) was established. Prior to becoming a diocese, these municipalities (with existing parishes) were administered from Dipolog—the capital of Zamboanga del Norte Province after its 1952 creation.

On July 31, 1967, Pope St. Paul VI granted Archbishop Lino Gonzaga y Rasdesales’ request to separate Zamboanga del Norte from the Archdiocese of Zamboanga through the apostolic letters Quantum Prosit, issued sub plumbo (under lead seal). This established the Diocese of Dipolog, encompassing all of Zamboanga del Norte. The parish church of Our Lady of the Most Holy Rosary was elevated to a cathedral, becoming the bishop’s seat. The Sacred Consistorial Congregation confirmed the appointment of Reverend Felix Zafra—a native of Bohol—as the first bishop under Provisia Ecclesiarum. He took possession of the diocese in October 1967.

The Diocese of Dipolog remained a suffragan of Zamboanga until January 24, 1983, when it was transferred to the newly elevated Archdiocese of Ozamis.

== Ordinaries ==
No.	Name	From	Until	Consecrated bishop	Coat of arms
1	Felix Sanchez Zafra (1920–2002)	July 31, 1967 (appointed)	October 20, 1986 (appointed as bishop of Tagbilaran)	October 22, 1967	
Sede vacante (October 21, 1986 – August 18, 1987)
2	Jose Ricare Manguiran (born 1936)	May 27, 1987 (appointed)	July 25, 2014 (retired)	August 19, 1987	
Sede vacante (July 26, 2014 – October 29, 2014) (under the care of Jose Ricare Manguiran as diocesan administrator immediately after effectivity of resignation)
3	Severo Cagatan Caermare (born 1969)	July 25, 2014 (appointed)	Present	October 30, 2014	

== Coat of arms ==
Coat of arms of Diocese of Dipolog
Notes "On top (chief), on a gold/yellow field symbolizing generosity, the monogram of the Holy Name of Jesus, IHS, in red, to symbolize the beginning of the evangelization of Zamboanga del Norte by the Society of Jesus in the 17th century. The monogram is circumscribed within the figure of a fish, also in red, representing the rich marine and mineral sources of the province. Below the fish figure, are three wavy lines in blue, the heraldic symbol for water, to symbolize the Subanens, the original Lumad settlers of the province. On base, on a blue field symbolizing truth, strength and faith, the monogram of the Blessed Virgin Mary, to symbolize Our Lady of the Most Holy Rosary, the principal patroness of the Diocese."

== See also ==
- Catholic Church in the Philippines
- Felix Zafra
