= Zamboanga del Norte Provincial Board =

Legislative body of the province of Zamboanga del Norte, Philippines

Zamboanga del Norte Provincial Board Sangguniang Panlalawigan ng Zamboanga del Norte

Type
- Type: Unicameral
- Term limits: 3 terms (9 years)

Leadership
- Presiding Officer: Julius Napigquit, Lakas-CMD since June 30, 2022

Structure
- Seats: 10 board members 4 ex officio board members 1 ex officio presiding officer
- Political groups: Lakas Liberal Nonpartisan
- Length of term: 3 years
- Authority: Local Government Code of the Philippines

Elections
- Voting system: Multiple non-transferable vote (regular members); Indirect election (ex officio members)
- Last election: May 12, 2025
- Next election: May 15, 2028

Meeting place
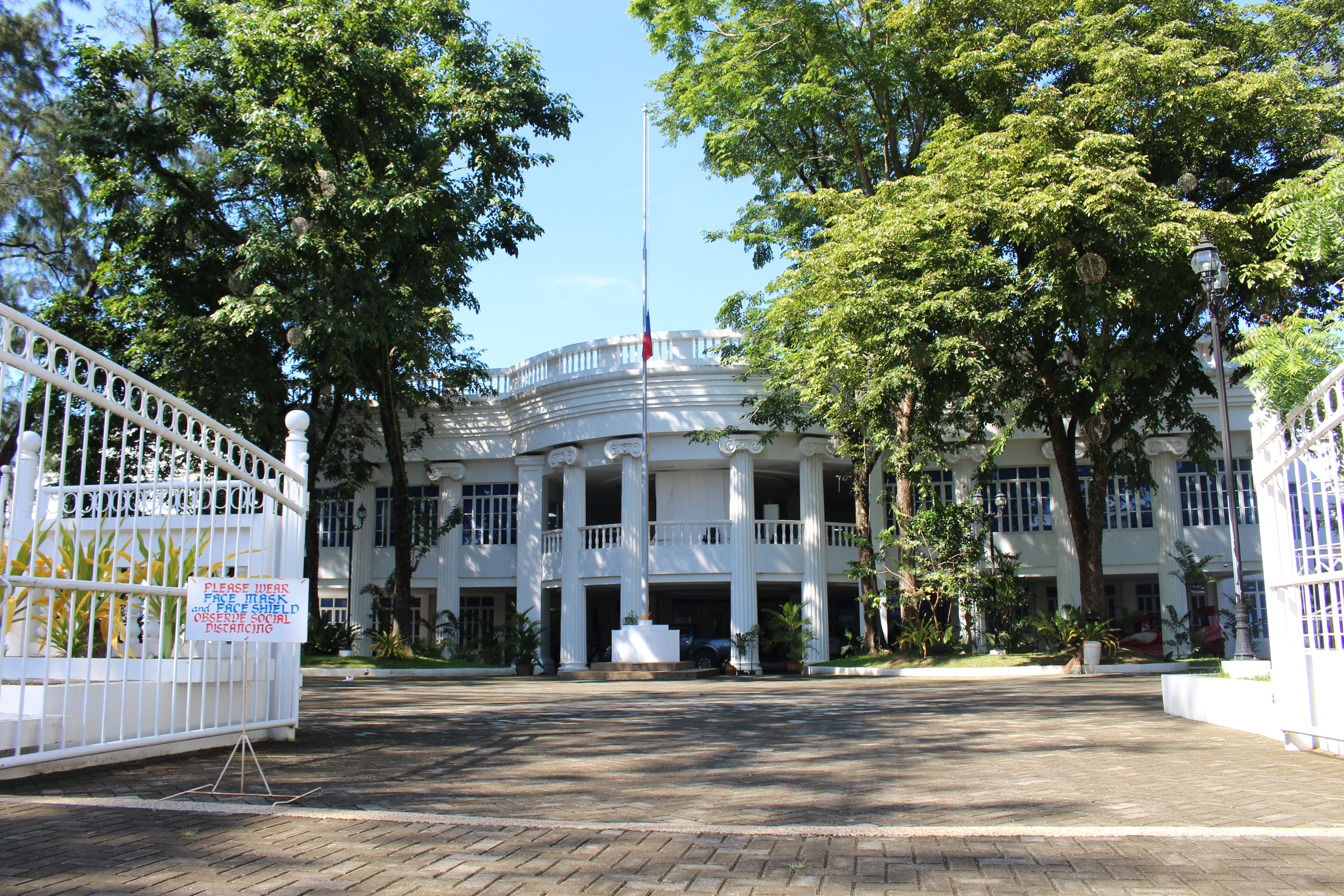
- Legislative Building, Zamboanga del Norte Provincial Capitol, Gen. Luna St., Estaka, Dipolog City, 7100

The Zamboanga del Norte Provincial Board is the Sangguniang Panlalawigan (provincial legislature) of the Philippine province of Zamboanga del Norte.

The members are elected via plurality-at-large voting: the province is divided into three districts, the first district sending two members, and the second and third districts sending four members each to the provincial board; the number of candidates the electorate votes for and the number of winning candidates depends on the number of members their district sends. The vice governor is the ex officio presiding officer, and only votes to break ties. The vice governor is elected via the plurality voting system province-wide.

The districts used in appropriation of members is coextensive with the legislative districts of Zamboanga del Norte.

Aside from the regular members, the board also includes the provincial federation presidents of the Liga ng mga Barangay (ABC, from its old name "Association of Barangay Captains"), the Sangguniang Kabataan (SK, youth councils) and the Philippine Councilors League (PCL).

== Apportionment ==
Elections	Seats per district			Ex officio seats	Total seats
Elections	1st	2nd	3rd	Ex officio seats	Total seats
2001–present	2	4	4	4	14

== List of members ==
=== Current members ===
These are the members after the 2025 local elections and 2023 barangay and SK elections:

- Vice Governor: Julius C. Napigquit (Lakas)

Seat	Board member	Party	Start of term	End of term
1st district	Dario M. Mandantes	Lakas	June 30, 2025	June 30, 2028
1st district	Jimmy Patrick Israel "Jimboy" B. Chan	Lakas	June 30, 2025	June 30, 2028
2nd district	Dante G. Bagarinao	Lakas	June 30, 2022	June 30, 2028
2nd district	Peter Y. Co	Lakas	June 30, 2022	June 30, 2028
2nd district	Michael "Jojo" M. Documento II	Lakas	June 30, 2022	June 30, 2028
2nd district	Richard G. Yebes	Lakas	June 30, 2025	June 30, 2028
3rd district	Venus A. Uy	Lakas	June 30, 2025	June 30, 2028
3rd district	Kay Marie P. Bolando	Lakas	June 30, 2022	June 30, 2028
3rd district	Leo Nicanor B. Mejorada	Liberal	June 30, 2022	June 30, 2028
3rd district	Jeff Raymund "JR" M. Brillantes	Liberal	June 30, 2022	June 30, 2028
ABC	Sushmita R. Jalosjos	Nonpartisan	November 30, 2023	November 30, 2026
PCL	Glenn L. Omaña	Lakas	September 8, 2025	June 30, 2028
SK	Leander James Q. Dangcalan	Nonpartisan	November 30, 2023	November 30, 2026
IPMR	Lahamuddin I. Jailani	Nonpartisan	February 25, 2026	February 25, 2029

== Officers ==
Position	Officer
Presiding officer	Vice Governor Julius C. Napigquit
Presiding officer pro tempore	Dario M. Mandantes
Majority floor leader	Peter Y. Co
1st assistant majority floor leader	Venus A. Uy
2nd assistant majority floor leader	Michael "Jojo" M. Documento, II
3rd assistant majority floor leader	Jimmy Patrick Israel "Jimboy" B. Chan

== Past members ==
=== Vice Governors ===
Election year	Name	Party	Ref.
1952-1956	Felipe B. Azcuna		
1956-1960	Romulo G. Garovillo		
1960-1964	Germanico Carreon		
1964-1968	Virgilio Lacaya		
1968-1971	Guardson R. Lood		
1971-1976	Virgilio Ramos		
1976-1980	Virgilio Lacaya		
1980-1988	Concordio "Cording" R. Adriatico		
1988-1992	Roldan "Brogs" B. Dalman		
1992	Eduardito S. Pacatang		
1995	Concordio "Cording" R. Adriatico		
1998	Concordio "Cording" R. Adriatico		
2001	Eduardito S. Pacatang	Lakas	
2004	Francis "Bebie" H. Olvis	PDSP	
2007	Francis "Bebie" H. Olvis	KAMPI	
2010	Francis "Bebie" H. Olvis	Lakas–Kampi	
2013	Senen O. Angeles	Liberal	
2016	Senen O. Angeles	Liberal	
2019	Senen O. Angeles	PDP–Laban	
2022	Julius C. Napigquit	PDP–Laban	
2025	Julius C. Napigquit	Lakas	

=== 1st district ===
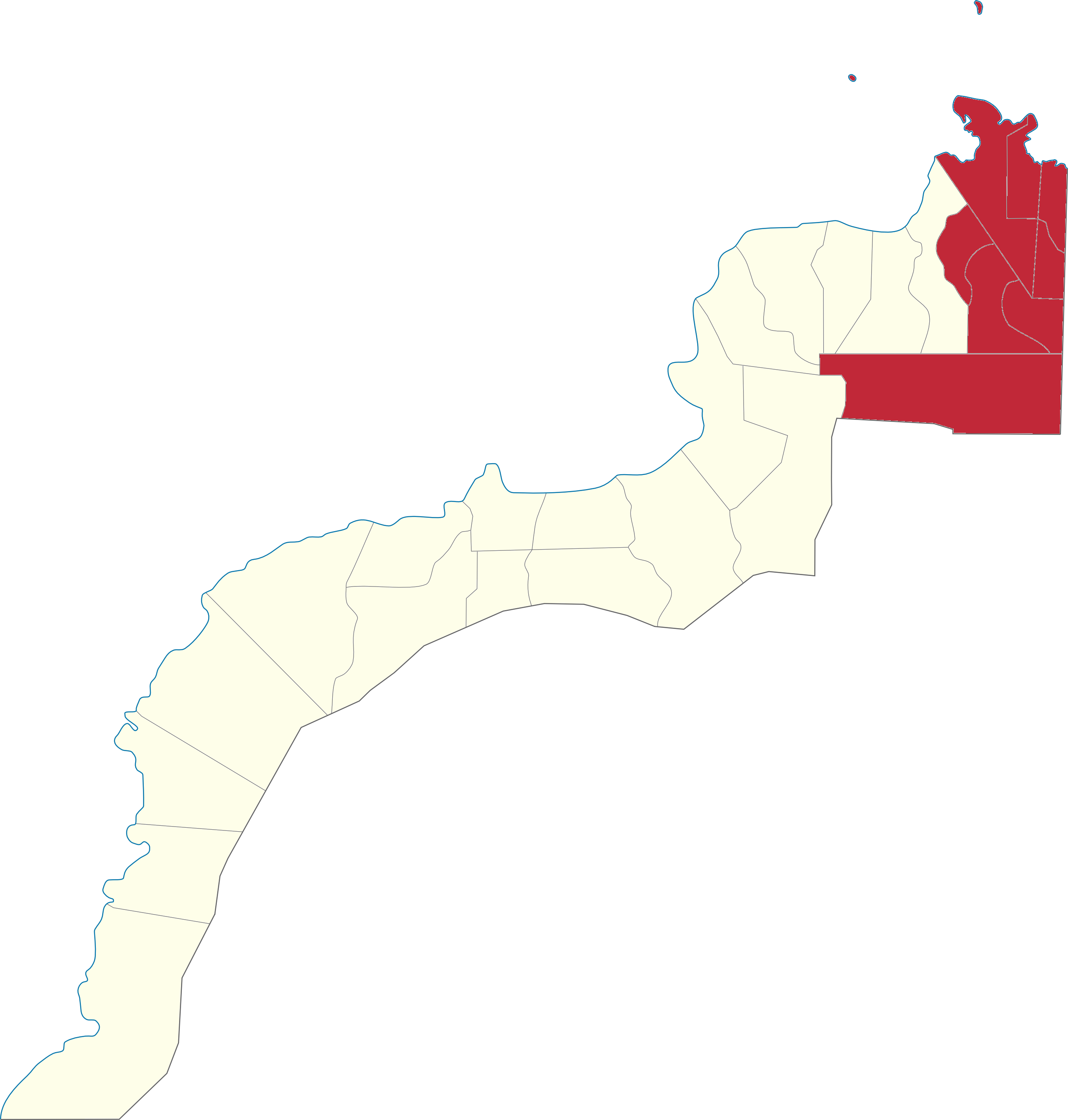
Map of the 1st District of Zamboanga del Norte

- City: Dapitan
- Municipalities: La Libertad, Mutia, Piñan, Polanco, Rizal, Sergio Osmeña Sr., Sibutad
- Population (2015): 224,893

Election year	Member (party)	Member (party)	Ref.
2001	Beda Bonga "Bong" G. Hamoy (NPC)	Florentino M. Dulang (PDSP)	
2004	Beda Bonga "Bong" G. Hamoy (PDSP)	Florentino M. Dulang (PMP)	
2007	Seth Frederick "Bullet" P. Jalosjos (KAMPI)	Fernando "Jun" R. Cabigon, Jr. (KAMPI)	
2010	Jose Joy H. Olvis (Lakas-Kampi-CMD)	Fernando "Jun" R. Cabigon, Jr. (Lakas-Kampi-CMD)	
2013	Fernando "Jun" R. Cabigon, Jr. (Nacionalista)	Joven "Ben" H. Zamora (Liberal)	
2016	Patri "Jing" B. Chan (Nacionalista)	Anabel "Bebing" G. Jalosjos-Garcia (UNA)	
2019	Patri "Jing" B. Chan (Nacionalista)	Anacleto "Boy" H. Olvis, Jr. (NPC)	
2022	Angelica "Angel" Jalosjos Carreon (Nacionalista)	Patri "Jing" B. Chan (PDP-Laban)	

=== 2nd district ===
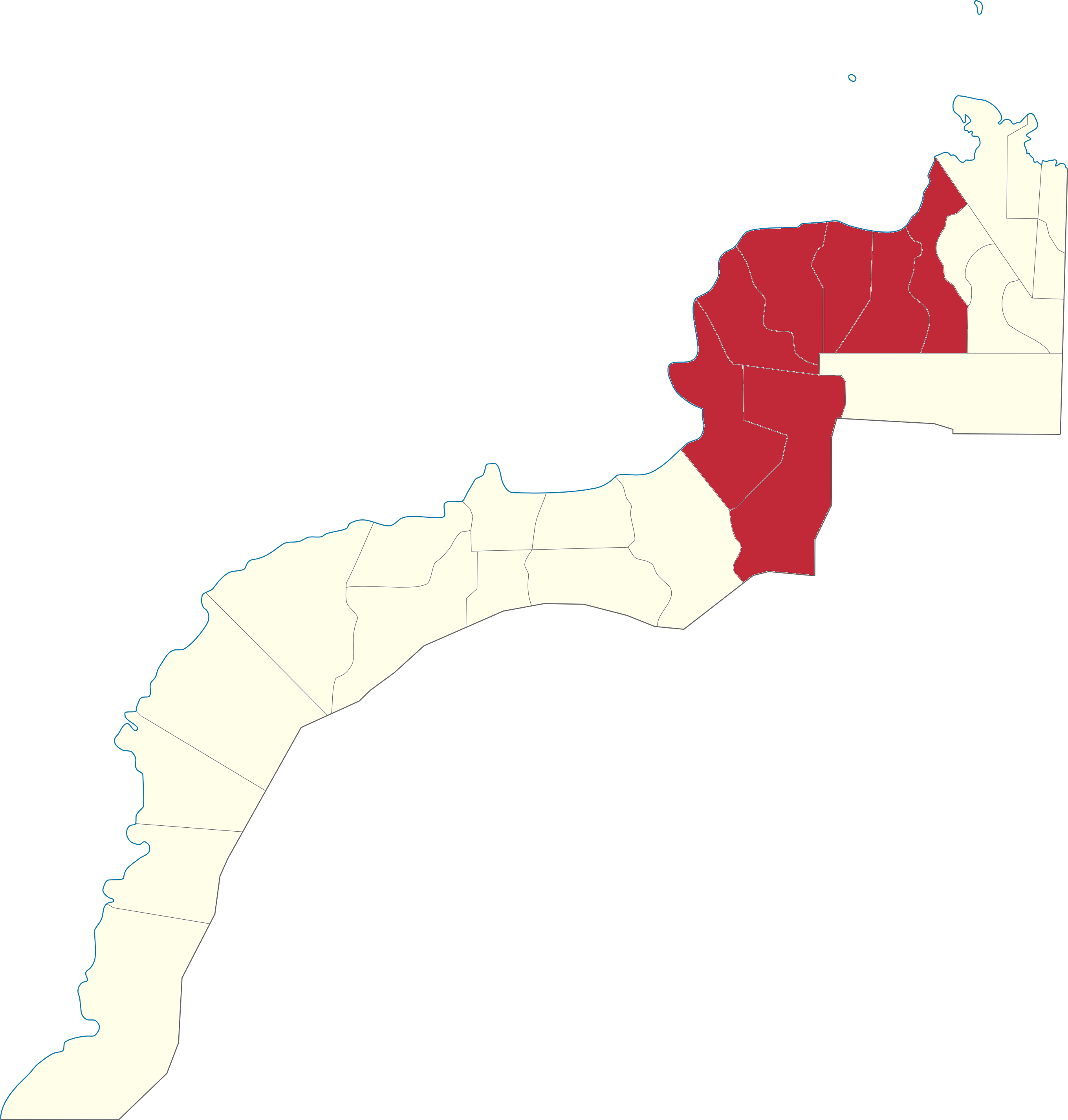
Map of the 2nd District of Zamboanga del Norte

- City: Dipolog
- Municipalities: Jose Dalman, Katipunan, Manukan, President Manuel A. Roxas, Siayan, Sindangan
- Population (2015): 413,974

Election year	Member (party)	Member (party)	Member (party)	Member (party)	Ref.
2001	Paulino "Paul" G. Gudmalin (Lakas)	Praxides "Praxy" P. Rubia (Lakas)	Uldarico "Ric" B. Mejorada (PMP)	Primitivo L. Abarquez III (Lakas)	
2004	Edionar "Loloy/Mr. Kasayuran" M. Zamoras (PMP)	Uldarico "Ric" B. Mejorada (PDSP)	Edgar J. Baguio (Lakas)	Cedric "Adre" L. Adriatico (PDSP)	
2007	Uldarico "Ricky" M. Mejorada II (KAMPI)	Edionar "Loloy/Mr. Kasayuran" M. Zamoras (KAMPI)	Edgar J. Baguio (KAMPI)	Cedric "Adre" L. Adriatico (KAMPI)	
2010	Edgar J. Baguio (Lakas-Kampi-CMD)	Cedric "Adre" L. Adriatico (Lakas-Kampi-CMD)	Uldarico "Ricky" M. Mejorada II (Lakas-Kampi-CMD)	Michael Alan Z. Ranillo (Lakas-Kampi-CMD)	
2013	Crisologo "Logoy" A. Decierdo (Liberal)	Ronillo "Boy" D. Lee (Liberal)	Julius C. Napigquit (Liberal)	Romulo "Muling" P. Soliva (Liberal)	
2016	Julius C. Napigquit (Liberal)	Ronillo "Boy" D. Lee (Liberal)	Crisologo "Logoy" A. Decierdo (Liberal)	Romulo "Muling" P. Soliva (Liberal)	
2019	Julius C. Napigquit (PDP-Laban)	Crisologo "Logoy" A. Decierdo (PDP-Laban)	Romulo "Muling" P. Soliva (PDP-Laban)	Ronillo "Boy" D. Lee (PDP-Laban)	
2022	Peter Y. Co (PDP-Laban)	Jasmin N. Pinsoy-Lagutin (PDP-Laban)	Dante G. Bagarinao (PDP-Laban)	Michael "Jojo" M. Documento, II (PDP-Laban)	

=== 3rd district ===
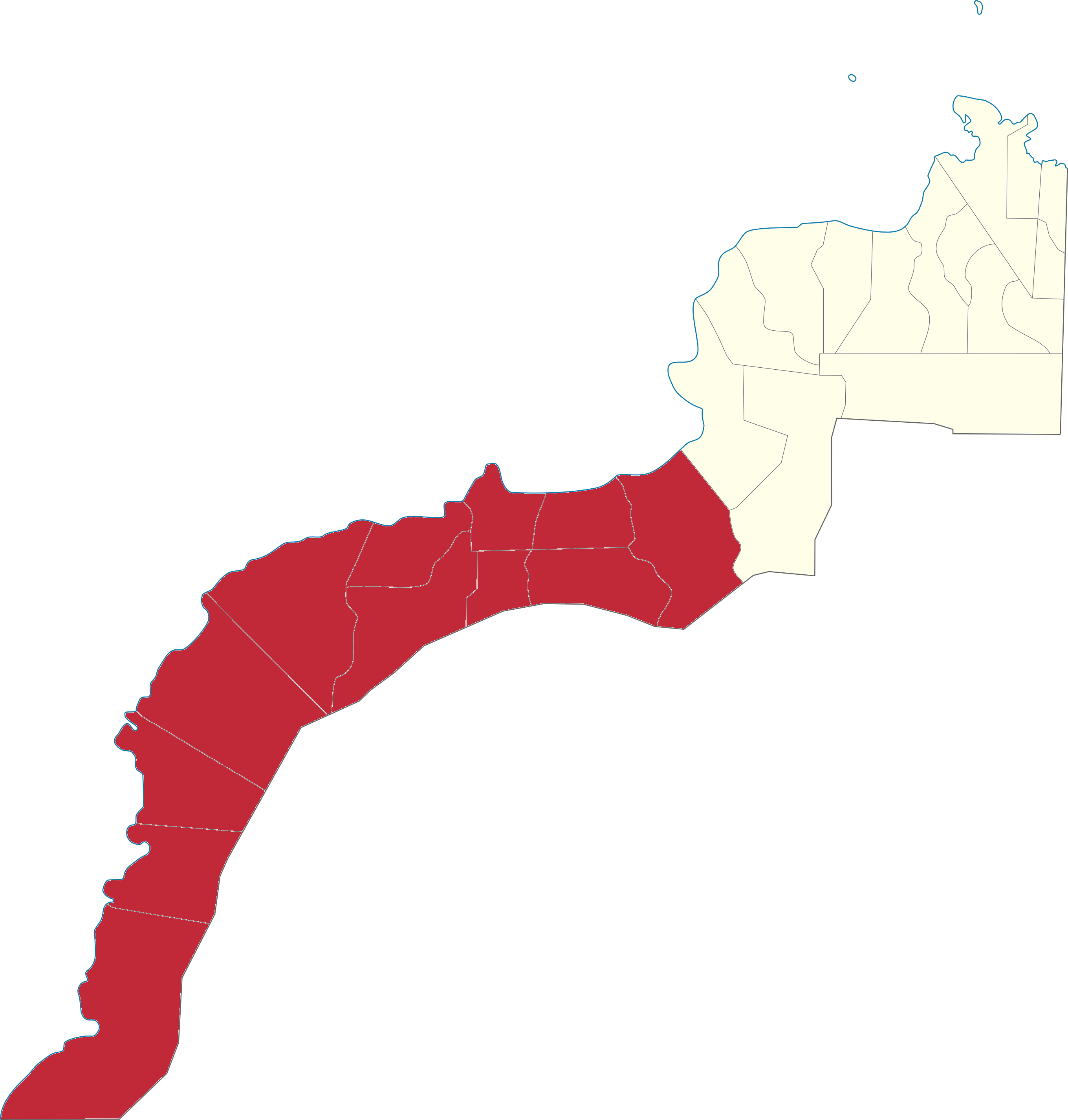
Map of the 3rd District of Zamboanga del Norte

- Municipalities: Baliguian, Godod, Gutalac, Kalawit, Labason, Leon B. Postigo, Liloy, Salug, Sibuco, Siocon, Sirawai, Tampilisan
- Population (2015): 372,526

Election year	Member (party)	Member (party)	Member (party)	Member (party)	Ref.
2001	Felixberto "Dodong" C. Bolando (Lakas)	Joseph Brendo "Jojo" C. Ajero (Lakas)	Florentino "Titing" T. Daarol (Lakas)	Jose B. Brillantes Jr. (Lakas)	
2004	Joseph Brendo "Jojo" C. Ajero (PMP)	Norbideiri "Bong" B. Edding (PMP)	Anecito "Citoy" S. Darunday (PMP)	Felixberto "Dodong" C. Bolando (Lakas)	
2007	Felixberto "Dodong" C. Bolando (KAMPI)	Joseph Brendo "Jojo" C. Ajero (KAMPI)	Norbideiri "Bong" B. Edding (KAMPI)	Anecito "Citoy" S. Darunday (KAMPI)	
2010	Romeo "Rudy" A. Cariño (Lakas-Kampi-CMD)	Florentino "Titing" T. Daarol (Lakas-Kampi-CMD)	Anecito "Citoy" S. Darunday (Lakas-Kampi-CMD)	Johanna "Han" D. Jalosjos (Lakas-Kampi-CMD)	
2013	Angel M. Carloto (Liberal)	Ruth M. Brillantes (Liberal)	Venus A. Uy (Nacionalista)	Luzviminda "Bebe" E. Torrino (Nacionalista)	
2016	Venus A. Uy (Liberal)	Ruth M. Brillantes (Liberal)	Angel M. Carloto (Liberal)	Luzviminda "Bebe" E. Torrino (Liberal)	
2019	Venus A. Uy (PDP-Laban)	Luzviminda "Bebe" E. Torrino (PDP-Laban)	Ruth M. Brillantes (PDP-Laban)	Constantino "Boy" C. Soriano, Jr. (Nacionalista)	
2022	Kay Marie P. Bolando (PDP-Laban)	Leo Nicanor B. Mejorada (PDP-Laban)	Franco Angelo "Conkee" C. Buctuan (PDP-Laban)	Jeff Raymund "JR" M. Brillantes (PDP-Laban)	

=== Philippine Councilors League President ===
These are members representing a group of elected councilors from the two City Councils (Dapitan and Dipolog) and twenty-five Municipal Councils of Zamboanga del Norte.

Election year	Member (party)	Local council	Ref.
2001	Dahlia T. Quimbo (Lakas)	Labason	
2004	Ferlormino S. Cabale (PMP)	Gutalac	
2010	Luzviminda "Bebe" E. Torrino (Independent)	Liloy	
2013	Dante G. Bagarinao (Liberal)	Dipolog	
2016	Peter Y. Co (Liberal)	Dipolog	
2019	Peter Y. Co (PDP-Laban)	Dipolog	
2022	Venus A. Uy (Note: Until June 30, 2025.) (PDP-Laban)	Liloy	
2025	Jerome E. Ochavo (Note: From June 30 to September 8, 2025.) (Lakas-CMD)	Sindangan	

=== Liga ng mga Barangay President ===
These members represent a group of elected Barangay captains from the 27 ABC councils of Zamboanga del Norte.

Election year	Member	Municipality/City	Ref.
2001	Enriquieta D. Bomediano	Tampilisan	
2004	Arasam A. Ismael		
2010	Marjorie N. Jalosjos	Liloy	
2013	Cicero N. Gurrea	Sindangan	
2018	Rogelio M. Isip	Liloy	
2023	Sushmita R. Jalosjos	Dapitan	

=== Sangguniang Kabataan Federation President ===
These members represent a group of elected SK chairpersons from 27 SK Federation councils of Zamboanga del Norte.

Election year	Member	Municipality/City	Ref.
2001	Frenalyn J. Magsalay		
2004	Jimmy Patrick Israel B. Chan	Dapitan	
2010	Charisse Marie N. Olvis		
2018	Miles P. Tejada-Galope	Labason	
2023	Leander James Q. Dangcalan	Dapitan	

=== Indigenous Peoples Mandatory Representative ===
These members represent a group of indigenous peoples (IP) in Zamboanga del Norte. A selection process for this position are held by the province's IP groups and validated by the National Commission on Indigenous Peoples.

Election year	Member	Municipality/City	Ref.
2023	Hadiya A. Caril	Sirawai	
2026	Lahamuddin I. Jailani	Sibuco	

== See also ==
- 2019 Zamboanga del Norte local elections
