= Glona Labadlabad =

Filipino politician from Zamboanga del Norte

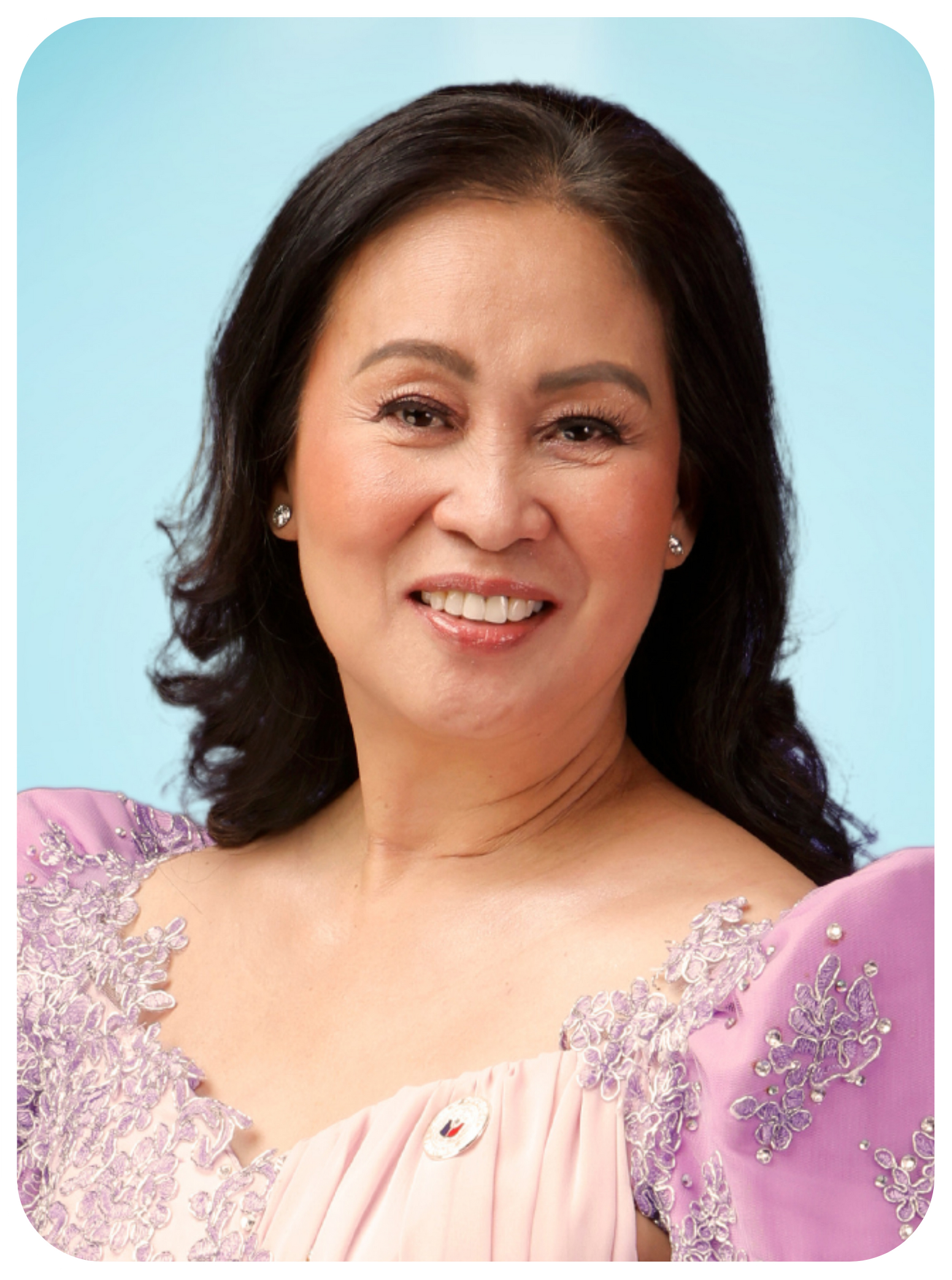
- Official portrait, 2022

Mayor of Sindangan, Zamboanga del Norte
- Incumbent
- Assumed office June 30, 2025
- Vice Mayor: Nilo Florentino "Boy" Z. Sy
- Preceded by: Rosendo S. Labadlabad

Member of the Philippine House of Representatives from Zamboanga del Norte's Second District
- In office June 30, 2016 – June 30, 2025
- Preceded by: Rosendo Labadlabad
- Succeeded by: Irene Labadlabad

Personal details
- Born: Glona Gollayan; April 3, 1963 (age 63) Jones, Isabela
- Party: Lakas–CMD (2023–present)
- Other political affiliations: PDP–Laban (2018–2023); Liberal (2012–2018)
- Spouse: Rosendo Labadlabad
- Children: 3, including Irene

Glona Labadlabad (née Gollayan) is a Filipino politician who is the incumbent mayor of Sindangan, Zamboanga del Norte. She previously served as a member of the House of Representatives of the Philippines, representing the 2nd district of Zamboanga del Norte from 2016-2025.

== Political career ==
Labadlabad made her first run in 2013 for municipal mayor of Katipunan, but was defeated. She then made her run and won in 2016 as representative of the province's second district, succeeding her husband, then-Congressman Rosendo Labadlabad. She was re-elected as representative in the elections of 2019 and in 2022 by a landslide vote.

In the 2025 elections, Labadlabad won the mayoralty race in Sindangan by a landslide vote. She succeeded her husband and then-mayor Rosendo Labadlabad in the position.

=== House of Representatives ===
In the 18th Congress, she chaired the House Committee on Ecology, and sits as member of the House Committees on Foreign Affairs, and Appropriations.

In November 2023, Labadlabad left PDP-Laban to join the Lakas–CMD party.

On February 5, 2025, Labadlabad was among the 95 Lakas–CMD members who voted to impeach vice president Sara Duterte.

=== Controversies ===
In 2019, Glona and Rosendo Labadlabad were charged with obstruction of justice for harboring a self-confessed killer from the neighboring town of Siayan, Zamboanga del Norte.

== Electoral history ==
2019 Philippine House of Representatives election in the Second District of Zamboanga del Norte
Party	Candidate	Votes	%
PDP–Laban	Glona Labadlabad	105,319	
Nacionalista	Flora Villarosa	88,638	
Total votes			
PDP–Laban hold			
