= Rosendo Labadlabad =

Filipino politician from the province of Zamboanga del Norte

The Honorable Rosendo Labadlabad
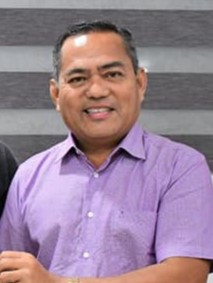
- Labadlabad in 2022

Mayor of Sindangan, Zamboanga del Norte
- In office June 30, 2019 – June 30, 2025
- Vice Mayor: Nilo Florentino "Boy" Z. Sy
- Preceded by: Nilo Florentino "Boy" Z. Sy
- Succeeded by: Glona Labadlabad

Member of the Philippine House of Representatives from Zamboanga del Norte's Second District
- In office June 30, 2007 – June 30, 2016
- Preceded by: Roseller L. Barinaga
- Succeeded by: Glona G. Labadlabad

Personal details
- Born: Rosendo Sabanal Labadlabad; March 1, 1965 (age 61) Dinasan, Jose Dalman, Zamboanga del Norte
- Party: Lakas (2007–2009; 2023–present)
- Other political affiliations: PDP–Laban (2016–2023); Liberal (2009–2016)
- Spouse: Glona Gollayan
- Children: 3, including Irene
- Occupation: Farmer, politician
- Nickname: Dodoy

Rosendo Sabanal Labadlabad, also known as Dodoy Labadlabad (born March 1, 1965), is a Filipino politician from the province of Zamboanga del Norte, who previously served as mayor of the municipality of Sindangan, Zamboanga del Norte from 2019 to 2025. He also formerly served as member of the Philippine House of Representatives from the 2nd legislative district of Zamboanga del Norte from 2007 to 2016.

== Political career ==
During his term as a congressman, Labadlabad became known to have initiated the construction of covered courts in many barangays covering the 2nd Congressional District of Zamboanga del Norte. He was also known for his steps in building classrooms for children in inter-barangay schools, which were part of his belief in valuing education.

During his term as mayor, he was able to remodel the town and built ambitious projects such as the Sindangan River Boardwalk, the Cultural and Sports Complex, Musical and Dancing Fountain, Sindangan Public Market, and bringing an extension campus of the Mindanao State University to his town.

== Controversies ==
- In 2017, Labadlabad sued DXFL radio personality Nick Carbonel for libel.
- In 2019, Labadlabad and his wife, Representative Glona Labadlabad, were charged with obstruction of justice for harboring a self-confessed killer of a certain murder incident that occurred in the neighboring town of Siayan, Zamboanga del Norte.
- In 2023, Labadlabad was ordered dismissed by the Ombudsman for the unauthorized issuance of permits to hold cockfighting matches outside cockpit arenas. However, the dismissal was reversed by the Ombudsman in 2024 following a review.

== Electoral history ==
Electoral history of Rosendo "Dodoy" Labadlabad
Year	Office	Party	Votes received				Result
Year	Office	Party	Total	%	P.	Swing	Result
2007	Representative (Zamboanga del Norte-2nd)	Lakas	—N/a	—N/a	1st	—N/a	Won
2010	Representative (Zamboanga del Norte-2nd)	Liberal	82,686	50.80%	1st	—N/a	Won
2013	Representative (Zamboanga del Norte-2nd)	Liberal	—N/a	—N/a	1st	—N/a	Won
2019	Mayor of Sindangan	PDP-Laban	27,767	—N/a	1st	—N/a	Won
2022	Mayor of Sindangan	PDP-Laban	32,098	—N/a	1st	—N/a	Won

Political offices
Preceded by Nilo Florentino Z. Sy	Mayor of Sindangan, Zamboanga del Norte; 2019-2025	Succeeded by Glona G. Labadlabad
House of Representatives of the Philippines
Preceded by Roseller L. Barinaga	Representative, 2nd District of Zamboanga del Norte; 2007-2016	Succeeded by Glona G. Labadlabad
