= Zamboanga del Norte's 2nd congressional district =

Legislative district of the Philippines

- Constituency for the House of Representatives of the Philippines
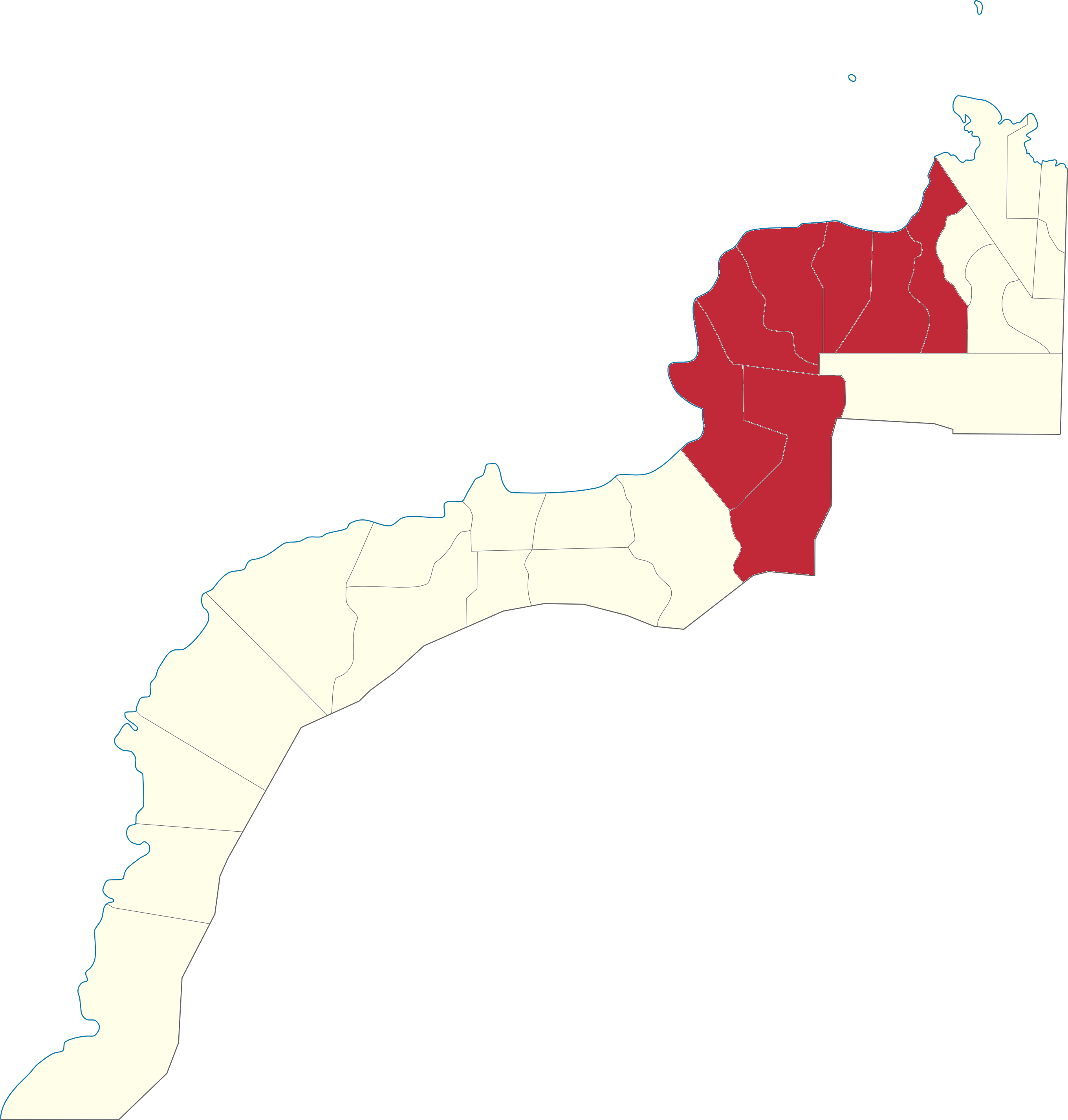
- Boundary of Zamboanga del Norte's 2nd congressional district in Zamboanga del Norte

- Location of Zamboanga del Norte within the Philippines
- Province: Zamboanga del Norte
- Region: Zamboanga Peninsula
- Population: 427,956 (2020)
- Electorate: 265,905 (2019)
- Major settlements: 7 LGUs: Cities; Dipolog; Municipalities; Jose Dalman; Katipunan; Manukan; President Manuel A. Roxas; Siayan; Sindangan
- Area: 2,018.60 km^{2} (779.39 sq mi)

Current constituency
- Created: 1987
- Representative: Irene Labadlabad
- Political party: Lakas
- Congressional bloc: Majority

Zamboanga del Norte's 2nd congressional district is one of the three congressional districts of the Philippines in the province of Zamboanga del Norte. It has been represented in the House of Representatives since 1987. The district consists of the provincial capital city of Dipolog and adjacent municipalities of Jose Dalman, Katipunan, Manukan, President Manuel A. Roxas, Siayan and Sindangan. It is currently represented in the 19th Congress by Irene Labadlabad of Lakas–CMD.

== Representation history ==
#	Member		Term of office		Congress	Party	Electoral history	Constituent LGUs
#	Image	Name (Birth-Death)	Start	End	Congress	Party	Electoral history	Constituent LGUs
=== Zamboanga del Norte's 2nd district for the House of Representatives of the Philippines ===
District created February 2, 1987 from Zamboanga del Norte's at-large district.
1		Ernesto S. Amatong	June 30, 1987	June 30, 1995	8th	Liberal	Elected in 1987.	1987–present Dipolog, Jose Dalman, Katipunan, Manukan, President Manuel A. Roxas, Siayan, Sindangan
1		Ernesto S. Amatong	June 30, 1987	June 30, 1995	9th	LDP	Re-elected in 1992.	1987–present Dipolog, Jose Dalman, Katipunan, Manukan, President Manuel A. Roxas, Siayan, Sindangan
2		Cresente Y. Llorente Jr.	June 30, 1995	June 30, 1998	10th	Lakas	Elected in 1995.	1987–present Dipolog, Jose Dalman, Katipunan, Manukan, President Manuel A. Roxas, Siayan, Sindangan
3		Roseller Barinaga (born 1936)	June 30, 1998	June 30, 2007	11th	LAMMP	Elected in 1998.	1987–present Dipolog, Jose Dalman, Katipunan, Manukan, President Manuel A. Roxas, Siayan, Sindangan
3		Roseller Barinaga (born 1936)	June 30, 1998	June 30, 2007	12th	NPC	Re-elected in 2001.	1987–present Dipolog, Jose Dalman, Katipunan, Manukan, President Manuel A. Roxas, Siayan, Sindangan
3		Roseller Barinaga (born 1936)	June 30, 1998	June 30, 2007	13th	NPC	Re-elected in 2004.	1987–present Dipolog, Jose Dalman, Katipunan, Manukan, President Manuel A. Roxas, Siayan, Sindangan
4		Rosendo Labadlabad (born 1965)	June 30, 2007	June 30, 2016	14th	Lakas	Elected in 2007.	1987–present Dipolog, Jose Dalman, Katipunan, Manukan, President Manuel A. Roxas, Siayan, Sindangan
4		Rosendo Labadlabad (born 1965)	June 30, 2007	June 30, 2016	15th	Liberal	Re-elected in 2010.	1987–present Dipolog, Jose Dalman, Katipunan, Manukan, President Manuel A. Roxas, Siayan, Sindangan
4		Rosendo Labadlabad (born 1965)	June 30, 2007	June 30, 2016	16th	Liberal	Re-elected in 2013.	1987–present Dipolog, Jose Dalman, Katipunan, Manukan, President Manuel A. Roxas, Siayan, Sindangan
5		Glona Labadlabad	June 30, 2016	June 30, 2025	17th	PDP–Laban	Elected in 2016.	1987–present Dipolog, Jose Dalman, Katipunan, Manukan, President Manuel A. Roxas, Siayan, Sindangan
5		Glona Labadlabad	June 30, 2016	June 30, 2025	18th	PDP–Laban	Re-elected in 2019.	1987–present Dipolog, Jose Dalman, Katipunan, Manukan, President Manuel A. Roxas, Siayan, Sindangan
5		Glona Labadlabad	June 30, 2016	June 30, 2025	19th	PDP–Laban	Re-elected in 2022.	1987–present Dipolog, Jose Dalman, Katipunan, Manukan, President Manuel A. Roxas, Siayan, Sindangan
5		Glona Labadlabad	June 30, 2016	June 30, 2025	19th	Lakas	Re-elected in 2022.	1987–present Dipolog, Jose Dalman, Katipunan, Manukan, President Manuel A. Roxas, Siayan, Sindangan
6		Irene Labadlabad	June 30, 2025	Incumbent	20th	Lakas	Elected in 2025.	1987–present Dipolog, Jose Dalman, Katipunan, Manukan, President Manuel A. Roxas, Siayan, Sindangan

== Election results ==
=== 2025 ===
2025 Philippine House of Representatives election in the Second District of Zamboanga del Norte
Party	Candidate	Votes	%
Lakas	Irene Labadlabad	165,985	72.74
Nacionalista	Tata Monteclaro	62,220	27.26
Margin of victory		103,765	
Total votes		228,205	100
Lakas hold			

=== 2022 ===
2022 Philippine House of Representatives election in the Second District of Zamboanga del Norte
Party	Candidate	Votes	%
PDP–Laban	Glona Labadlabad (incumbent)	163,853	93.44
Independent	Sonia Cabigon	11,509	6.56
Margin of victory		152,344	
Total votes		175,362	100
PDP–Laban hold			

=== 2019 ===
2019 Philippine House of Representatives election in the Second District of Zamboanga del Norte
Party	Candidate	Votes	%
PDP–Laban	Glona Labadlabad (incumbent)	105,319	54.30
Nacionalista	Flora Villarosa	88,638	45.70
Margin of victory		16,681	
Total votes		193,957	100
PDP–Laban hold			

=== 2016 ===
2016 Philippine House of Representatives election in the Second District of Zamboanga del Norte
Party	Candidate	Votes	%
Liberal	Glona Labadlabad	119,854	76.54
Nacionalista	Gilbert Cruz	36,746	23.46
Margin of victory		83,106	
Total votes		156,600	100
Liberal hold			

== See also ==
- Legislative districts of Zamboanga del Norte
