= Dipolog City Council =

Legislative body of the city of Dipolog, Philippines

Dipolog City Council Konseho sa Dakbayan sa Dipolog Sangguniang Panlungsod ng Dipolog
- 18th Dipolog City Council
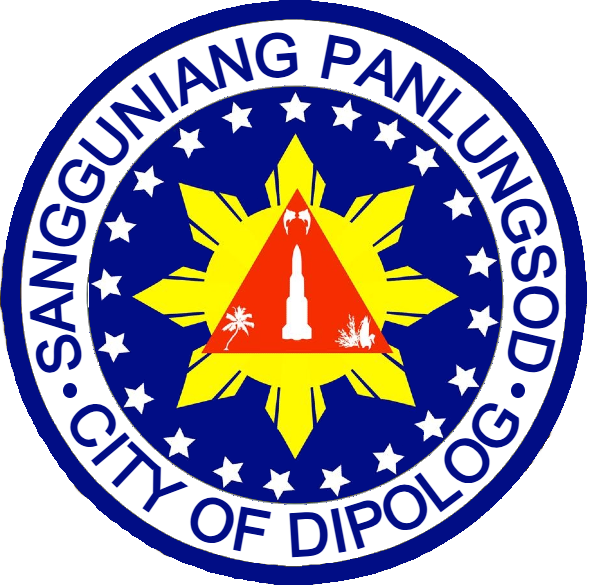

Type
- Type: Unicameral
- Term limits: 3 terms (9 years)

Leadership
- Presiding Officer: Senen O. Angeles, Lakas-CMD since 30 June 2022
- Presiding Officer pro tempore: Raul C. Barbaso, Lakas-CMD since 30 June 2025
- Majority floor Leader: Jonald C. Napigquit, Lakas-CMD since 30 June 2025
- Minority floor Leader: Ofelia G. Acis, PFP since 30 June 2025

Structure
- Seats: 10 councilors; 2 ex officio members; 1 ex officio presiding officer
- Political groups: Lakas (10) PFP (1) Nonpartisan (2)
- Length of term: 3 years
- Authority: Dipolog City Charter; Local Government Code of the Philippines

Elections
- Voting system: Plurality-at-large voting (10 seats); Indirect elections (2 seats)
- Last election: May 12, 2025
- Next election: May 15, 2028

Meeting place
- Function Hall, Building B, Boulevard Commercial Complex, Dipolog Boulevard, Central, Dipolog

Website
- spdipolog.net

The Dipolog City Council (Filipino: Sangguniang Panlungsod ng Dipolog, Cebuano: Konseho sa Dakbayan sa Dipolog) is Dipolog's Sangguniang Panlungsod or legislative body. The council has thirteen (13) members which is composed of ten (10) councilors, one (1) ex officio member elected from the ranks of barangay (neighborhood) chairmen, one (1) ex officio member elected from the ranks of Sangguniang Kabataan (youth council) chairmen and one (1) presiding officer. The city's vice-mayor is the council's presiding officer, who is elected citywide.

The council creates laws and ordinances under the city's jurisdiction. The mayor can veto proposed bills, but the council can override it with a two-thirds supermajority.

The council usually meets at the Session Hall of the Sangguniang Panlungsod Building along Padre Jose A. Ramon Street at Estaka for regular sessions. As of 2023, the Sangguniang Panlungsod Building is undergoing redevelopment, and the council temporarily meets and holds offices at the Function Room of the Boulevard Commercial Complex at the Dipolog Boulevard.

== Powers, duties and functions ==
The Sangguniang Panlungsod, as the legislative body of the city, is mandated by the Local Government Code of 1991 (Republic Act No. 7160) to:

- Enact ordinances;
- Approve resolutions;
- Appropriate funds for the general welfare of the city and its inhabitants; and
- Ensure the proper exercise of the corporate powers of the city as provided for under Section 22 of the Local Government Code.

Furthermore, the following duties and functions are relegated to the Sangguniang Panlungsod:

- Approve ordinances and pass resolutions necessary for an efficient and effective city government;
- Generate and maximize the use of resources and revenues for the development plans, program objectives and priorities of the city as provided for under section 18 of the Local Government Code of 1991, with particular attention to agro-industrial development and citywide growth and progress;
- Enact ordinances granting franchises and authorizing the issuance of permits or licenses, upon such conditions and for such purposes intended to promote the general welfare of the inhabitants of the city but subject to the provisions of Book II of the Local Government Code of 1991;
- Regulate activities relative to the use of land, buildings, and structures within the city in order to promote the general welfare of its inhabitants;
- Approve ordinances which shall ensure the efficient and effective delivery of the basic services and facilities as provided for under Section 17 of the Local Government Code; and
- Exercise such other powers and perform such other duties and functions as may be prescribed by law or ordinance.

== Membership ==
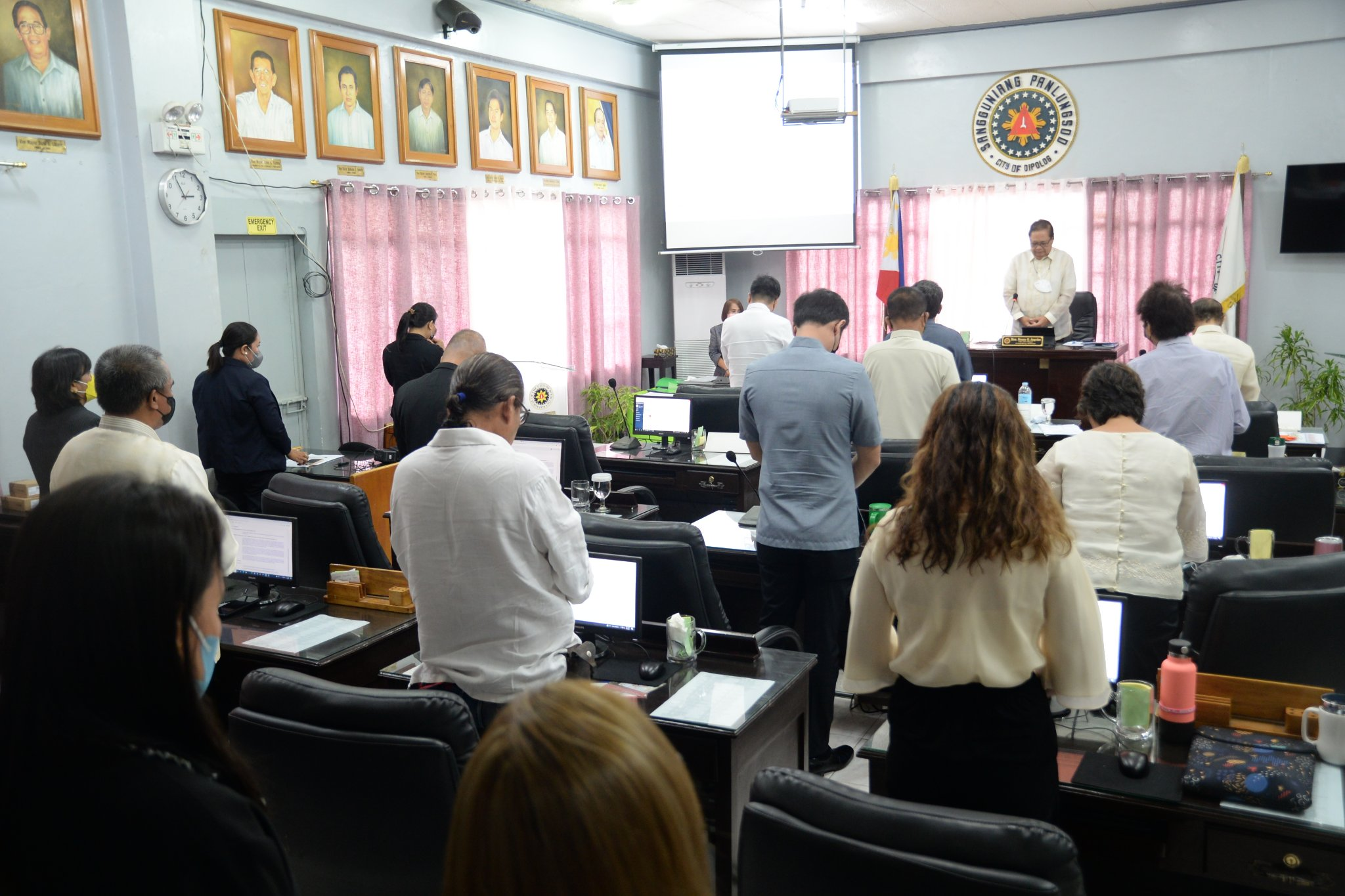
17th City Council on its first session, 6 July 2022.

Each of Dipolog's councilor elects ten members of the council. In plurality-at-large voting, a voter may vote for up to ten candidates and the candidates with the ten highest numbers of votes are elected. Barangay and SK chairs throughout the city each elect a representative to the council, for a total of 12 councilors. City-council elections are synchronized with other elections in the country, which have been held on the second Monday of May every third year since 1992.

=== 2025 - 2028 membership ===
These are the members after the 2025 local elections and 2023 barangay and SK elections:

Position	Name	Party
Presiding Officer	Senen O. Angeles	Lakas
City; Councilors	Ryan Niel A. Asprer	Lakas
City; Councilors	James Cyril L. Ruiz III	Lakas
City; Councilors	Jonald C. Napigquit	Lakas
City; Councilors	Roseller L. Barinaga	Lakas
City; Councilors	Harrison T. Young	Lakas
City; Councilors	Kenny Val U. Ong	Lakas
City; Councilors	Romulo P. Soliva	Lakas
City; Councilors	Raul C. Barbaso	Lakas
City; Councilors	Praxides P. Rubia	Lakas
City; Councilors	Ofelia G. Acis	PFP
ABC President	Irvin A. Banga (Estaka)	Nonpartisan
SK Federation President	Kristine Irish May M. Cuenca (Galas)	Nonpartisan

== Officers ==
Position	Officer
Presiding officer	Vice Mayor Senen O. Angeles
Presiding officer pro tempore	Raul C. Barbaso
Majority floor leader	Jonald C. Napigquit
1st assistant floor leader	Roseller L. Barinaga
2nd assistant floor leader	Praxides P. Rubia
3rd assistant floor leader	James Cyril L. Ruiz III
Minority floor leader	Ofelia G. Acis

== Former councils ==
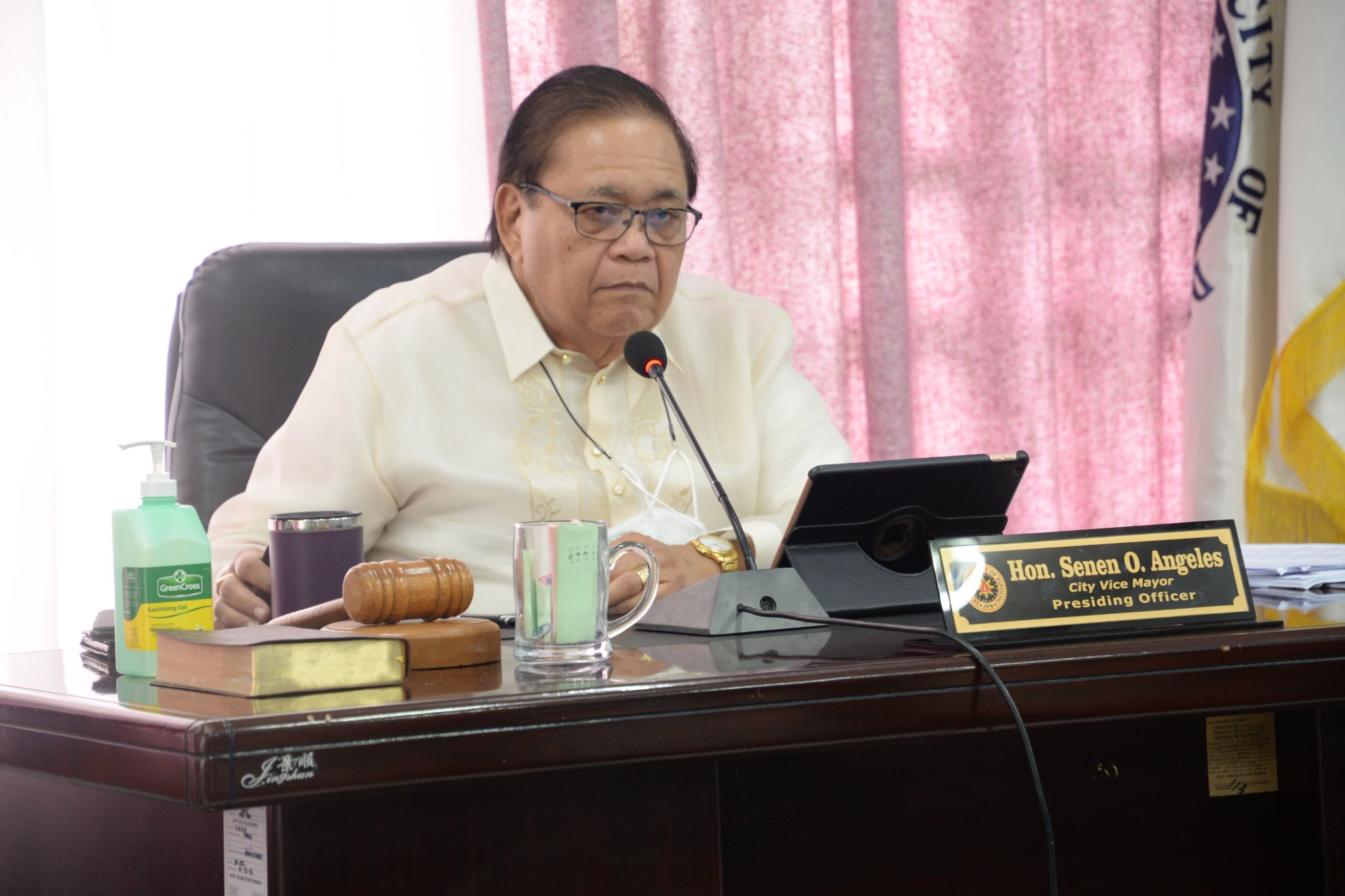
Senen Angeles, Presiding officer of the 11th, 12th, 13th, 17th, and 18th City Councils

17th City Council (2022-2025)
Position	Name	Party
Presiding Officer	Senen O. Angeles	PDP–Laban
City; Councilors	James Cyril L. Ruiz III	PDP–Laban
City; Councilors	Roger V. Asprer	PDP–Laban
City; Councilors	Roseller L. Barinaga	PDP–Laban
City; Councilors	Jonald C. Napigquit	PDP–Laban
City; Councilors	James P. Verduguez (Note: On February 4, 2025, Verduguez resigned as City Councilor upon appointment as Prosecutor IV (City Prosecutor) for the National Prosecution Service.)	PDP–Laban
City; Councilors	Marilou Y. Calibo	PDP–Laban
City; Councilors	Romulo P. Soliva	PDP–Laban
City; Councilors	Eduardo C. Baron	PDP–Laban
City; Councilors	Praxides P. Rubia	PDP–Laban
City; Councilors	Maynard R. Baes	PDP–Laban
City; Councilors	Ritch Reinald T. Uy (Note: On March 5, 2025, Uy was appointed and sworn in to the Council to finish Verduguez's unfinished term.)	
ABC President	Irvin A. Banga (Estaka)	Nonpartisan
SK Federation President	Kristine Irish May M. Cuenca (Galas)	Nonpartisan

16th City Council (2019-2022)
Position	Name	Party
Presiding Officer	Horacio B. Velasco	PDP–Laban
City; Councilors	Jasmin N. Pinsoy - Lagutin	PDP–Laban
City; Councilors	James Cyril L. Ruiz III	PDP–Laban
City; Councilors	Roger V. Asprer	PDP–Laban
City; Councilors	Raul C. Barbaso	PDP–Laban
City; Councilors	James P. Verduguez	PDP–Laban
City; Councilors	Eduardo C. Baron	PDP–Laban
City; Councilors	Peter Y. Co	PDP–Laban
City; Councilors	Marilou Y. Calibo	PDP–Laban
City; Councilors	Praxides P. Rubia	PDP–Laban
City; Councilors	Maynard R. Baes	PDP–Laban
ABC President	Julius B. Gajonera (Sicayab)	Nonpartisan
SK Federation President	Mandel Zoe B. Lugasan (Santa Isabel)	Nonpartisan

15th City Council (2016-2019)
Position	Name	Party
Presiding Officer	Horacio B. Velasco	Liberal
City; Councilors	Jasmin N. Pinsoy	Liberal
City; Councilors	Jonald C. Napigquit	Liberal
City; Councilors	Roger V. Asprer	Liberal
City; Councilors	Peter Y. Co	Liberal
City; Councilors	Raul C. Barbaso	Liberal
City; Councilors	James Cyril O. Ruiz	Liberal
City; Councilors	Eduardo C. Baron	Liberal
City; Councilors	Maynard R. Baes	Liberal
City; Councilors	Rubencio B. Legorio	Liberal
City; Councilors	Marilou Y. Calibo	Liberal
ABC President	Rosanna R. Diaz (Central)	Nonpartisan
ABC President	Julius B. Gajonera (Sicayab) (Note: Gajonera took Diaz's place after a leadership change since the 2018 Barangay elections in Dipolog.)	Nonpartisan
SK Federation President	Mandel Zoe B. Lugasan (Santa Isabel)	Nonpartisan

14th City Council (2013-2016)
Position	Name	Party
Presiding Officer	Horacio B. Velasco	Liberal
City; Councilors	Jasmin N. Pinsoy	Liberal
City; Councilors	Dante Ricky G. Bagarinao	Liberal
City; Councilors	Peter Y. Co	Liberal
City; Councilors	Raul C. Barbaso	Liberal
City; Councilors	James P. Verduguez	Liberal
City; Councilors	James Cyril O. Ruiz	Liberal
City; Councilors	Praxides P. Rubia	Liberal
City; Councilors	Kenny Val U. Ong	Liberal
City; Councilors	Rubencio B. Legorio	Liberal
City; Councilors	Jonald C. Napigquit	Liberal
ABC President	Janus I. Yu (Miputak) (Note: Yu served until 2015.)	Nonpartisan
ABC President	Maynard R. Baes (Turno) (Note: Baes served after taking Janus Yu's place until he resigned from the position to run for city councilor for the 2016 elections.)	Nonpartisan
ABC President	Rosanna R. Diaz (Central) (Note: Diaz, who took over Maynard Baes's position, served the remaining unexpired term of Janus Yu, and continue in the next Sangguniang Panlungsod membership change before the 2018 Barangay elections in Dipolog.)	Nonpartisan
SK Federation President	Ma. Katrina B. Bagarinao	Nonpartisan

13th City Council (2010-2013)
Position	Name	Party
Presiding Officer	Senen O. Angeles	Liberal
City; Councilors	Dante Ricky G. Bagarinao	Liberal
City; Councilors	Horacio B. Velasco	Liberal
City; Councilors	Jonald C. Napigquit	Liberal
City; Councilors	James P. Verduguez	Liberal
City; Councilors	Marvelita N. Pinsoy	Liberal
City; Councilors	Praxides P. Rubia	Liberal
City; Councilors	Kenny Val U. Ong	Liberal
City; Councilors	Romulo P. Soliva	Liberal
City; Councilors	James Cyril O. Ruiz	Liberal
City; Councilors	Rubencio B. Legorio	Liberal
ABC President	Janus I. Yu (Miputak)	Nonpartisan
SK Federation President	Ma. Katrina B. Bagarinao	Nonpartisan

12th City Council (2007-2010)
Position	Name	Party
Presiding Officer	Senen O. Angeles	Lakas
City; Councilors	Peter Y. Co	Lakas
City; Councilors	Horacio B. Velasco	Lakas
City; Councilors	Raul C. Barbaso	Lakas
City; Councilors	Marvelita N. Pinsoy	Lakas
City; Councilors	Dante Ricky G. Bagarinao	Lakas
City; Councilors	Praxides P. Rubia	Lakas
City; Councilors	Julius C. Napigquit	Lakas
City; Councilors	James P. Verduguez	Lakas
City; Councilors	Romulo P. Soliva	Lakas
City; Councilors	Kenny Val U. Ong	Lakas
ABC President	Janus I. Yu (Miputak)	Nonpartisan
SK Federation President	Cheemar L. Soliva	Nonpartisan

11th City Council (2004-2007)
Position	Name	Party
Presiding Officer	Senen O. Angeles	LDP
City; Councilors	Horacio B. Velasco	Lakas
City; Councilors	Peter Y. Co	Lakas
City; Councilors	Uldarico M. Mejorada II	Lakas
City; Councilors	Raul C. Barbaso	Lakas
City; Councilors	Romulo P. Soliva	Lakas
City; Councilors	Cesar B. Romero	Lakas
City; Councilors	Nenita B. Lacaya	Aksyon
City; Councilors	Alton C. Ratificar	Lakas
City; Councilors	Julius C. Napigquit	Lakas
City; Councilors	Roberto N. Pinsoy	Independent
ABC President	Emerenciana U. Velasco (Miputak)	Nonpartisan
SK Federation President	Edwin Aldren M. Refugio (Galas)	Nonpartisan

10th City Council (2001-2004)
Position	Name	Party
Presiding Officer	Edelburgo L. Cheng	Lakas
City; Councilors	Peter Y. Co	Lakas
City; Councilors	Dante Ricky G. Bagarinao	Lakas
City; Councilors	Roberto N. Pinsoy	Lakas
City; Councilors	Uldarico M. Mejorada, II	Lakas
City; Councilors	Raul C. Barbaso	Lakas
City; Councilors	Alton C. Ratificar	Lakas
City; Councilors	Nenita B. Lacaya	Lakas
City; Councilors	Cesar B. Romero	Lakas
City; Councilors	Julius C. Napigquit	Lakas
City; Councilors	Senen O. Angeles	LDP
ABC President	Kenny Val U. Ong (Central)	Nonpartisan
SK Federation President	Edwin Aldren M. Refugio (Galas)	Nonpartisan

9th City Council (1998-2001)
Position	Name	Party
Presiding Officer	Edelburgo L. Cheng	
City; Councilors	Edionar M. Zamoras	
City; Councilors	Desiree L. Lee	
City; Councilors	Horacio B. Velasco	
City; Councilors	Saint G. Barinaga	
City; Councilors	Cedric L. Adriatico	
City; Councilors	Alton C. Ratificar	
City; Councilors	Dante Ricky G. Bagarinao	
City; Councilors	Cesar B. Romero	
City; Councilors	Roberto N. Pinsoy	
City; Councilors	Michael Alan Z. Ranillo	
ABC President	Elias J. Pampilo, Jr. (Dicayas)	Nonpartisan
SK Federation President	Faith Ester G. Barinaga	Nonpartisan

1970-1978 Membership
Position	Name	Party
Presiding Officer	Roseller L. Barinaga	
City; Councilors	Gamelin Sevilleno	
City; Councilors	Fortunato Manogura	
City; Councilors	Deogracias Hamac, Jr	
City; Councilors	Jose Villarinte, Jr.	
City; Councilors	Alejandro Alferez	
City; Councilors	Jacobo S. Amatong	
City; Councilors	Narciso Barbaso	
City; Councilors	Pelagio Lachica	

1913 Founding Membership
Position	Name
Presiding Officer	Veronico C. Olvis
Municipal; Councilors	Feliciano Ordinaria
Municipal; Councilors	Marcelino Adriatico
Municipal; Councilors	Paciano J. Ortega
Municipal; Councilors	Lorenzo Regencia
Municipal; Councilors	Romualdo Gonzales

== Prominent members ==
- Horacio B. Velasco - doctor, City Vice Mayor (2013 - 2022), and former City Councilor (1992 - 2001, 2004 - 2013)
- Senen O. Angeles - lawyer, former city councilor (2001 - 2004), former city vice mayor (2004 - 2013), and Vice Governor of Zamboanga del Norte (2013 - 2022).
- Edelburgo L. Cheng - former City Mayor (March 27, 1998 - June 30, 1998), and former City Vice Mayor (1995 - March 1998; July 1998 - 2004).
- Julius C. Napigquit - lawyer, former City Councilor (2001 - 2010), and 2nd District Board Member of Zamboanga del Norte (2013 - 2022)
- Romulo P. Soliva - former City Councilor (2004 - 2013), and 2nd District Board Member of Zamboanga del Norte (2013 - 2022)
- Uldarico M. Mejorada II - lawyer, former City Councilor (2001 - 2007), and former 2nd District Board Member of Zamboanga del Norte (2007 - 2013)
- Edionar M. Zamoras - radio broadcaster, former City Councilor (1998 - 2001), and former 2nd District Board Member of Zamboanga del Norte (2004 - 2010)
- Jacobo S. Amatong - lawyer, publisher, former City Councilor (1970 - 1978), and martial law victim.

== See also ==
- Dipolog
- Mayor of Dipolog
- 2019 Zamboanga del Norte local elections
