= Manukan, Zamboanga del Norte =

Municipality in Zamboanga del Norte, Philippines

Manukan
- Municipality
- Municipality of Manukan
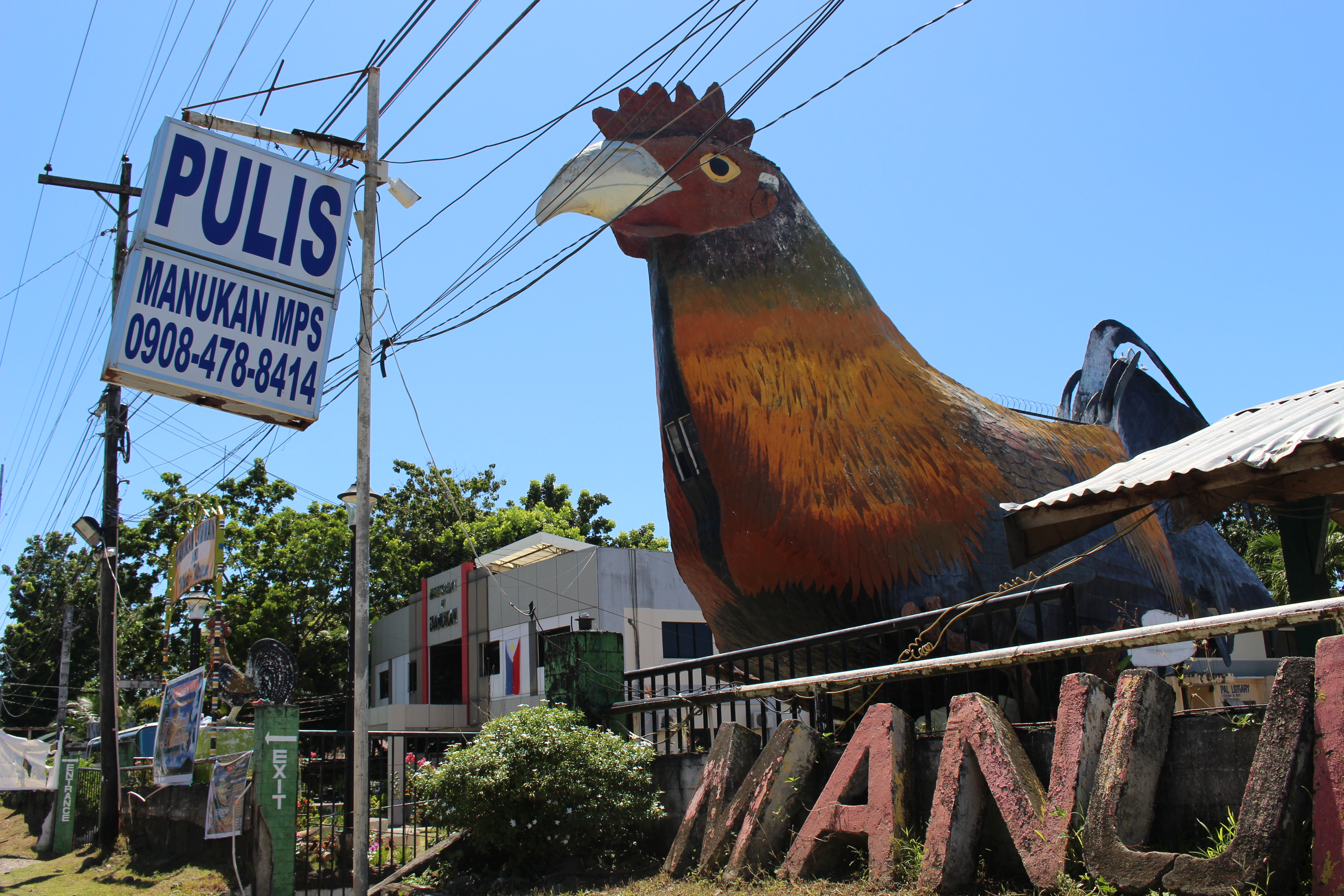
- Statue of Rooster along with Municipal Hall of Manukan

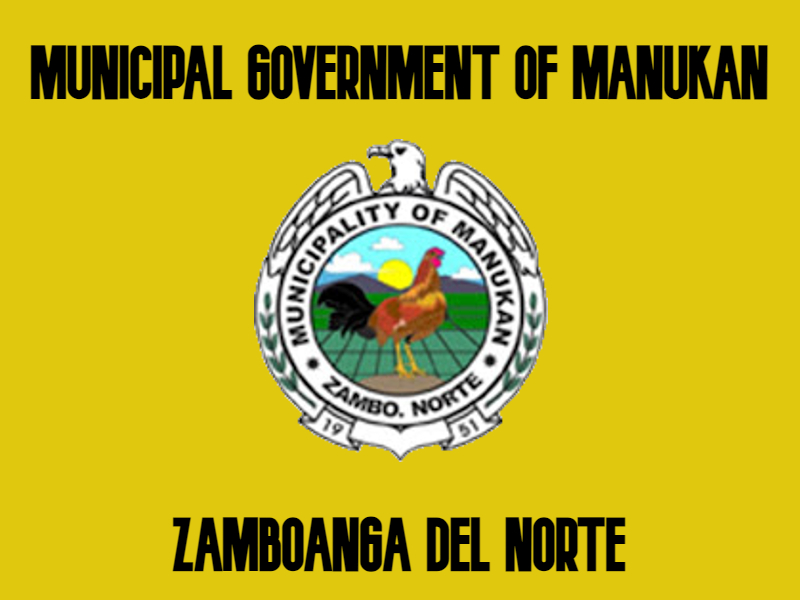
- Flag Seal
- Etymology: Manukan lit. Poultry
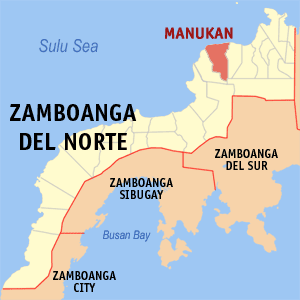
- Map of Zamboanga del Norte with Manukan highlighted
- Interactive map of Manukan
- Location within the Philippines
- Coordinates: 8°30′58″N 123°05′30″E
- Country: Philippines
- Region: Zamboanga Peninsula
- Province: Zamboanga del Norte
- District: 2nd district
- Founded: June 16, 1951
- Barangays: 22 (see Barangays)

Government
  - Type: Sangguniang Bayan
  - Mayor: Enriquita U. Winters (Lakas)
  - Vice Mayor: Eugene U. Caballero (Lakas)
  - Representative: Irene G. Labadlabad (Lakas)
  - Municipal Council: Members: Glenn L. Omaña; Chilly D. Oñez; Melisa G. Belagantol; Guillermo B. Omay, Jr.; Mariane P. Elorta-Alia; Guilbert J. Villarin; Flerida M. Agustin; Felicito B. Cafe
  - Electorate: 26,342 voters (2025)

Area
  - Total: 246.35 km^{2} (95.12 sq mi)
- Elevation: 66 m (217 ft)
- Highest elevation: 427 m (1,401 ft)
- Lowest elevation: 0 m (0 ft)

Population (2024 census)
  - Total: 35,669
  - Density: 144.79/km^{2} (375.00/sq mi)
  - Households: 8,560

Economy
  - Income class: 1st municipal income class
  - Poverty incidence: 54.37% (2023)
  - Revenue: ₱ 220.3 million (2024)
  - Assets: ₱ 492.2 million (2024)
  - Expenditure: ₱ 277.1 million (2024)
  - Liabilities: ₱ 143.5 million (2024)

Service provider
  - Electricity: Zamboanga del Norte Electric Cooperative (ZANECO)
- Time zone: UTC+8 (PST)
- ZIP code: 7110
- PSGC: 0907207000
- IDD : area code: +63 (0)65
- Native languages: Subanon; Cebuano; Chavacano; Tagalog
- Website: manukan.zamboangadelnorte.com

Manukan, officially the Municipality of Manukan (Cebuano: Lungsod sa Manukan; Subanen: Benwa Manukan; Chavacano: Municipalidad de Manukan; Tagalog: Bayan ng Manukan), is a municipality in the province of Zamboanga del Norte, Philippines. According to the 2024 census, it has a population of 35,669 people.

It is located 38 kilometres (24 mi) west of Dipolog, the provincial capital, and 282 kilometres (175 mi) north-east of Zamboanga City.

== History ==
During the Pre-Spanish era this town was inhabited by the Subanons. During the Spanish colonization, Manukan was a barrio part of Dapitan. In the creation of the municipality of Katipunan, this barrio became a barangay Manukan. Chickens were plenty and breeds that supply the northern part of Mindanao come from this town. "Manukan" word means poultry farm. On June 16, 1951, thru the effort of former Congressman (and later Senator) Roseller T. Lim with the help of Governor Serapio J. Datoc of the former Province of Zamboanga, President Elpidio Quirino signed into law Republic Act No. 655 creating the municipality of Manukan. In 1952, the barrios of Manukan, Lipras, Dipane, Linay, Mate, Sirongan, Libuton, Disakan, Siparok, Ponot, and Manawan of Katipunan were formed into the town of Manukan.

Sitio Libuton became a barangay in 1954.

Lipras was renamed San Antonio in 1957.

In 1979, by virtue of Batas Pambansa Blg. 15, seven barangays in the southwestern part of the municipality were separated to create the municipality of Ponot (now Jose Dalman).

In 1990, a nocturnal tornado also known as "the Manukan tornado" hit the town leaving 51 people dead and 100 people injured.

== Geography ==
=== Climate ===
Climate data for Manukan, Zamboanga del Norte
Month	Jan	Feb	Mar	Apr	May	Jun	Jul	Aug	Sep	Oct	Nov	Dec	Year
Mean daily maximum °C (°F)	29 (84)	29 (84)	30 (86)	31 (88)	30 (86)	30 (86)	29 (84)	30 (86)	30 (86)	29 (84)	29 (84)	29 (84)	30 (85)
Mean daily minimum °C (°F)	23 (73)	23 (73)	23 (73)	24 (75)	25 (77)	25 (77)	24 (75)	24 (75)	24 (75)	24 (75)	24 (75)	24 (75)	24 (75)
Average precipitation mm (inches)	104 (4.1)	76 (3.0)	92 (3.6)	97 (3.8)	199 (7.8)	238 (9.4)	195 (7.7)	193 (7.6)	178 (7.0)	212 (8.3)	171 (6.7)	110 (4.3)	1,865 (73.3)
Average rainy days	14.7	12.5	15.8	17.5	27.6	28.5	29.0	27.5	26.9	27.9	23.5	18.2	269.6
Source: Meteoblue

=== Barangays ===
Manukan is politically subdivided into 22 barangays. Each barangay consists of puroks while some have sitios.

The central Poblacion is where the municipal seat is located. Nine of the barangays are along the national highway and the rest of them are mountain barangays, being three or more kilometers away from the national highway that runs mostly along the coast of the municipality.

- Dipane
- Disakan
- Don Jose Aguirre
- East Poblacion
- Gupot
- Libuton
- Linay
- Lingatongan
- Lupasang
- Mate
- Meses
- Palaranan
- Pangandao
- Patagan
- Poblacion
- Punta Blanca
- Saluyong
- San Antonio also known as Lipras

-The last brgy of Manukan, and a nearby brgy to Brgy. Dohinob, one of the brgy of Municipality of Pres. M.A Roxas.

- Serongan
- Suisayan
- Upper Disakan
- Villaramos

== Demographics ==
Population census of Manukan

Year	Pop.	±% p.a.
1960	19,886	—
1970	27,286	+3.21%
1975	33,444	+4.17%
1980	23,112	−7.12%
1990	28,554	+2.14%
1995	29,681	+0.73%

Year	Pop.	±% p.a.
2000	31,855	+1.53%
2007	33,129	+0.54%
2010	35,589	+2.64%
2015	36,526	+0.50%
2020	36,887	+0.21%
2024	35,669	−0.80%

Source: Philippine Statistics Authority

== Economy ==
Poverty incidence of Manukan (%)

Source: Philippine Statistics Authority

== Government ==
Mayors of the
Municipality of Manukan
Prudencio C. Tiu, Sr., July 20, 1951-1962
Virgilio A. Ramos, 1962-1967
Inocencio T. Go, 1967-1968
Jose S. Teves, 1968-1976
Jesus A. Ramos, 1976-1984, 1985-1986
Benefico T. Panagsagan, 1984-1985
Jacinto C. Ruedas, Jr., 1930-1933, 1992-year unknown
Elpidio M. Sagario, 1987
Ranulfo M. Suarez, 1987-1988
a certain Panagsagan, 1989-1992
Maria Teresa G. Caballero, 2001-2004
Eugene U. Caballero, 2004-2013, 2016-2025
Enriquita U. Winters, 2013-2016, 2025-present

Manukan's local government structure is composed of one mayor, one vice mayor and eight councilors, named as Sangguniang Bayan members, all elected through popular vote. Three ex officio members are added to the Sangguniang Bayan with one representing Manukan's 22 Barangay Captains being the Association of Barangay Councils (ABC) President, and one representing Manukan's 22 Barangay Youth Council Presidents being the Sangunniang Kabataan (SK) Federation President, and one representing a group of indigenous peoples of Manukan being the Indigenous Peoples Mandatory Representative (IPMR). Each official, with the exemption of the ABC and SK Presidents and IPMR, is elected publicly to a 3-year term and can be re-elected up to 3 terms in succession.

== Healthcare ==
Manukan is being served by the Medicare Community Hospital of Manukan, often known as Trifon H. Saile Memorial Hospital, a community hospital located in Barangay Poblacion.

== Education ==
Manukan I District

- Manukan East Central School
- Manukan West Central School
- L. Disakan
- Libuton ES
- Mate ES
- Palaranan ES
- Patunan ES
- Upper Disakan
- Serongan ES
- Suisayan ES
- Patagan PS
- Pangandao PS
- Sitog PS
- Tiniguiban
- Upper Disakan NHS
- Manukan National High School

Manukan II District ELEMENTARY SCHOOLS

- San Antonio
- Villaramos ES
- Dipane ES
- Saluyong ES
- Lupasang ES
- Meses ES
- Gupot ES
- Don Jose ES
- Lingatongan
- Loquillos ES
- Linay CS

SECONDARY SCHOOLS

- Saluyong NHS
- Jesus A. Ramos NHS formerly Villaramos NHS
- Don Jose Aguirre NHS
