= Irene Labadlabad =

Filipino politician (born 1993)

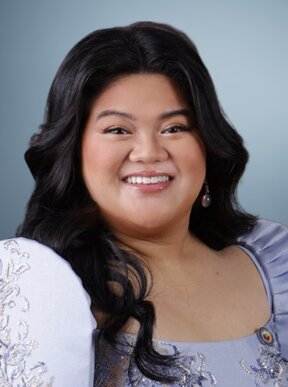
- Official portrait, 2025

Member of the Philippine House of Representatives from Zamboanga del Norte's 2nd District
- Incumbent
- Assumed office June 30, 2025
- Preceded by: Glona Labadlabad

Personal details
- Born: Irene Gollayan Labadlabad; October 4, 1993 (age 33) Los Angeles, California, United States of America
- Party: Lakas (2024–present)
- Parents: Rosendo Labadlabad (father); Glona Labadlabad (mother)
- Education: University of California, Irvine

Irene Gollayan Labadlabad (born October 4, 1993) is a Filipino politician serving as a member of the House of Representatives since 2025. She is the daughter of Rosendo Labadlabad and Glona Labadlabad.
