= Roseller Barinaga =

Filipino lawyer and politician (born 1936)

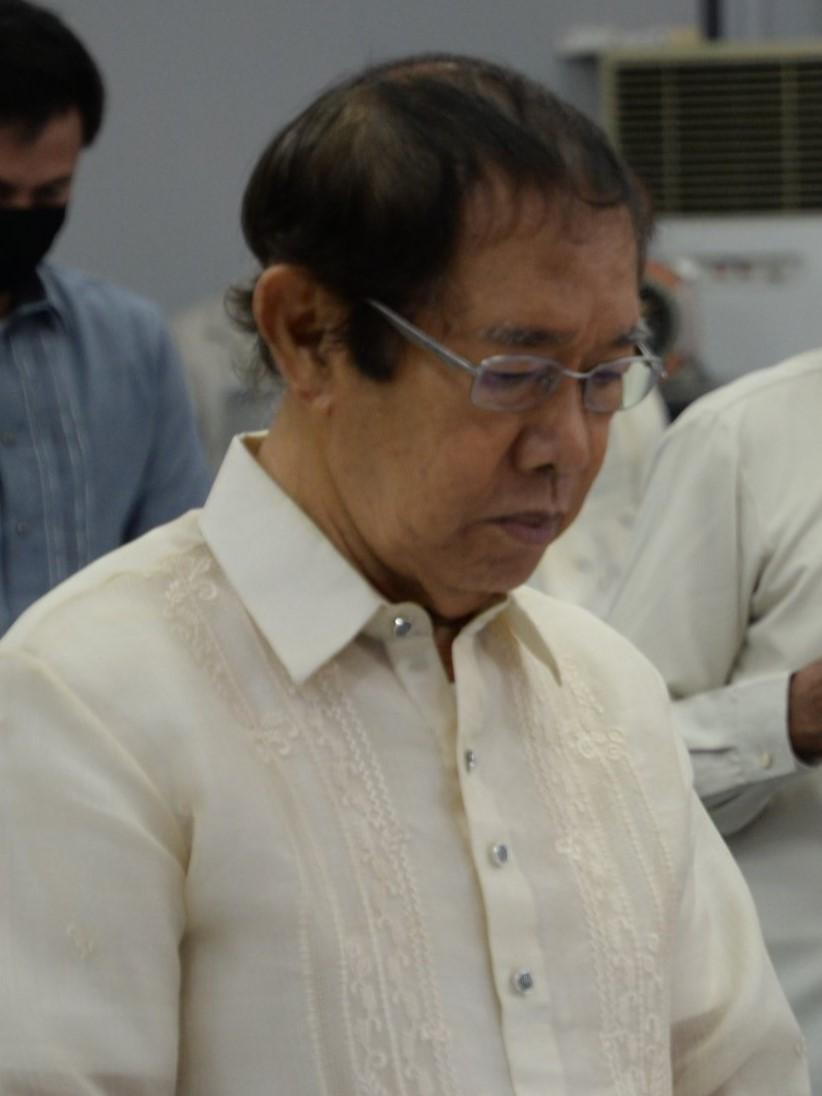
- Barinaga in 2022

Member of City Council of Dipolog
- Incumbent
- Assumed office June 30, 2022

Member of the Philippine House of Representatives from Zamboanga del Norte's Second District
- In office June 30, 1998 – June 30, 2007
- President: Joseph Estrada; Gloria Macapagal Arroyo
- Preceded by: Cresente Y. Llorente, Jr.
- Succeeded by: Rosendo S. Labadlabad

13th Mayor of Dipolog
- In office February 2, 1988 – March 27, 1998
- Preceded by: Pascual B. Bajamunde
- Succeeded by: Edelburgo L. Cheng
- In office May 1978 – April 1986
- Preceded by: Felicisimo L. Herrera
- Succeeded by: Dario B. Lacaya

Vice Mayor of Dipolog
- In office 1970–1978

Personal details
- Born: Roseller Lara Barinaga; August 4, 1936 (age 90) Zamboanga, Zamboanga, Commonwealth of the Philippines
- Party: Lakas (2024–present); APP (local party; 2021–present)
- Other political affiliations: PDP-Laban (2021–2024); NPC (2001–2007); LAMMP (1998–2001); Nacionalista (until 1998)
- Education: UE College of Law
- Occupation: Lawyer, professor, politician
- Nickname: Matoy

Roseller "Matoy" Barinaga (born August 4, 1936) is a Filipino lawyer and politician from the province of Zamboanga del Norte. He previously served as Vice Mayor of Dipolog (1970–1978), Mayor of Dipolog (1978–1986; 1988–1998), member of the Philippine House of Representatives from the 2nd legislative district of Zamboanga del Norte from 1998 to 2007, and Undersecretary for Mindanao of the National Anti-Poverty Commission (2016–2018).

Apart from his political career, Barinaga served as a professor and dean in Jose Rizal Memorial State University - Main Campus in Dapitan.

== Political career ==
Barinaga, then a vice mayor at that time, was appointed as city mayor by Philippine President Ferdinand Marcos in 1978. He would be removed from the position after the 1986 EDSA People Power Revolution. Not long enough, Barinaga would return to city hall as mayor in 1988 until his resignation in 1998 when he ran and won as representative for the 2nd District of Zamboanga del Norte until 2007.

After several failed attempts since the 2007 local elections (with the exception of the 2016 local elections), Barinaga won a seat in the Dipolog City Council placing third overall, making his return to the political limelight after 15 years.

== Honors ==
A classroom inside Dalupan Building in University of the East in Manila was renamed Cong. Roseller L. Barinaga Room being an alumnus of the UE College of Law.

House of Representatives of the Philippines
Preceded by Cresente Y. Llorente, Jr.	Representative, 2nd District of Zamboanga del Norte; 1998-2007	Succeeded by Rosendo S. Labadlabad
Political offices
Preceded by Pascual B. Bajamunde	Mayor of Dipolog; 1988-1998	Succeeded by Edelburgo L. Cheng
Preceded by Felicisimo L. Herrera	Mayor of Dipolog; 1978-1986	Succeeded by Dario B. Lacaya
