= Jose Dalman =

Municipality in Zamboanga del Norte, Philippines

Jose Dalman Ponot
- Municipality
- Municipality of Jose Dalman, Lungsod sa Jose Dalman, Bayan ng Jose Dalman
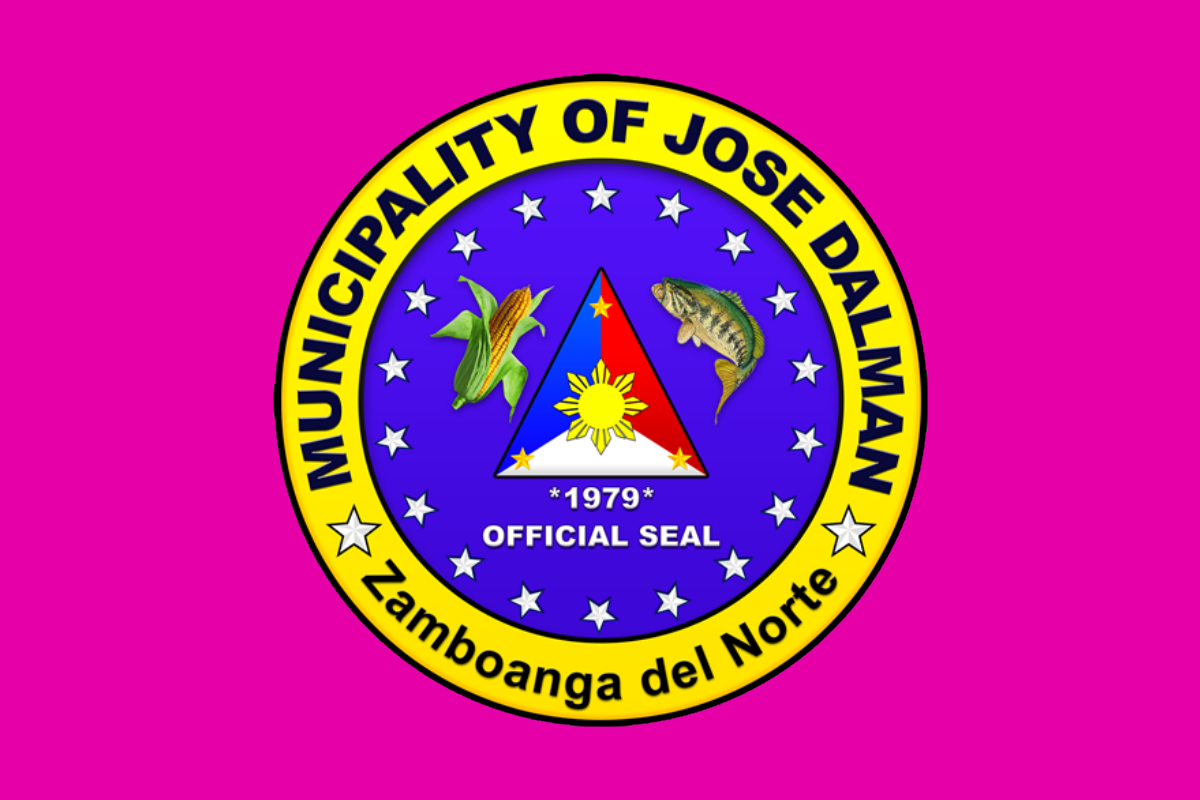
- Flag Seal
- Nickname: The Pink Town
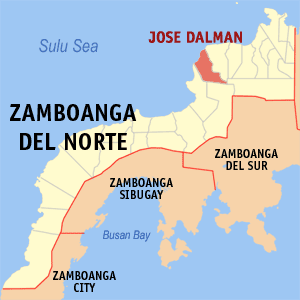
- Map of Zamboanga del Norte with Jose Dalman highlighted
- Interactive map of Jose Dalman
- Location within the Philippines
- Coordinates: 8°26′34″N 123°01′19″E
- Country: Philippines
- Region: Zamboanga Peninsula
- Province: Zamboanga del Norte
- District: 2nd district
- Founded: 1979
- Named for: Jose Cabilin Dalman
- Barangays: 18 (see Barangays)

Government
  - Type: Sangguniang Bayan
  - Mayor: Allen T. Ferrater (Lakas)
  - Vice Mayor: Julieta J. Macapaz (Lakas)
  - Representative: Irene G. Labadlabad (Lakas)
  - Municipal Council: Members: Richard L. Sabejon; Elmer D. Libre; Felimon L. Jakosalem, Jr.; Evangeline G. Campos; Val Angelo D. Regencia; Richard D. Dalogdog, Jr.; Rizalina M. Dalman; Benjamin V. Amahan
  - Electorate: 22,288 voters (2025)

Area
  - Total: 135.00 km^{2} (52.12 sq mi)
- Elevation: 78 m (256 ft)
- Highest elevation: 390 m (1,280 ft)
- Lowest elevation: 0 m (0 ft)

Population (2024 census)
  - Total: 27,951
  - Density: 207.04/km^{2} (536.24/sq mi)
  - Households: 6,187

Economy
  - Income class: 3rd municipal income class
  - Poverty incidence: 63.39% (2023)
  - Revenue: ₱ 158.6 million (2024)
  - Assets: ₱ 320.4 million (2024)
  - Expenditure: ₱ 61.51 million (2024)
  - Liabilities: ₱ 91.77 million (2024)

Service provider
  - Electricity: Zamboanga del Norte Electric Cooperative (ZANECO)
- Time zone: UTC+8 (PST)
- ZIP code: 7111
- PSGC: 0907222000
- IDD : area code: +63 (0)65
- Native languages: Subanon; Cebuano; Chavacano; Tagalog
- Website: josedalman.zamboangadelnorte.com

Jose Dalman, officially the Municipality of Jose Dalman (Cebuano: Lungsod sa Jose Dalman; Subanen: Benwa Jose Dalman; Chavacano: Municipalidad de Jose Dalman; Tagalog: Bayan ng Jose Dalman), is a municipality in the province of Zamboanga del Norte, Philippines. According to the 2024 census, it has a population of 27,951 people.

== History ==
Jose Dalman, formerly known as Ponot, was originally part of the municipality of Manukan.

The municipality was established by virtue of Batas Pambansa (BP) Blg. 15 approved on January 3, 1979, upon separation of seven barangays in southwestern part of Manukan, with Barangay Ponot the seat of government. A plebiscite was held on April 3.

It was renamed by virtue of BP Blg. 381 enacted on April 8, 1983, through the effort of former Assemblyman Guardson Lood.

It is named after Jose Cabilin Dalman, one of the former students of the national hero Jose Rizal during his exile in Dapitan and mayor of this town's mother municipality of Katipunan.

== Geography ==
=== Barangays ===
Jose Dalman is politically subdivided into 18 barangays. Each barangay consists of puroks while some have sitios.

- Balatakan
- Bitoon
- Dinasan
- Ilihan
- Labakid
- Lipay
- Litalip
- Lopero
- Lumaping
- Madalag
- Manawan
- Marupay
- Poblacion (Ponot)
- Sigamok
- Siparok
- Tabon
- Tamarok
- Tamil

=== Climate ===
Climate data for Jose Dalman, Zamboanga del Norte
Month	Jan	Feb	Mar	Apr	May	Jun	Jul	Aug	Sep	Oct	Nov	Dec	Year
Mean daily maximum °C (°F)	29 (84)	29 (84)	30 (86)	31 (88)	30 (86)	30 (86)	29 (84)	30 (86)	30 (86)	29 (84)	29 (84)	29 (84)	30 (85)
Mean daily minimum °C (°F)	23 (73)	23 (73)	23 (73)	24 (75)	25 (77)	25 (77)	24 (75)	24 (75)	24 (75)	24 (75)	24 (75)	24 (75)	24 (75)
Average precipitation mm (inches)	104 (4.1)	76 (3.0)	92 (3.6)	97 (3.8)	199 (7.8)	238 (9.4)	195 (7.7)	193 (7.6)	178 (7.0)	212 (8.3)	171 (6.7)	110 (4.3)	1,865 (73.3)
Average rainy days	14.7	12.5	15.8	17.5	27.6	28.5	29.0	27.5	26.9	27.9	23.5	18.2	269.6
Source: Meteoblue

== Demographics ==
Population census of Jose Dalman
Year	Pop.	±% p.a.
1980	15,308	—
1990	17,952	+1.61%
1995	21,745	+3.66%
2000	23,322	+1.51%
2007	26,017	+1.52%
2010	27,033	+1.40%
2015	27,388	+0.25%
2020	28,881	+1.12%
2024	27,951	−0.78%
Source: Philippine Statistics Authority

== Economy ==
Poverty incidence of Jose Dalman (%)

Source: Philippine Statistics Authority

== Notable personalities ==
- Rene Mark Cuarto - Professional Boxer

== See also ==
- List of renamed cities and municipalities in the Philippines
