= Katipunan, Zamboanga del Norte =

Municipality in Zamboanga del Norte, Philippines

Katipunan Lubungan
- Municipality
- Municipality of Katipunan
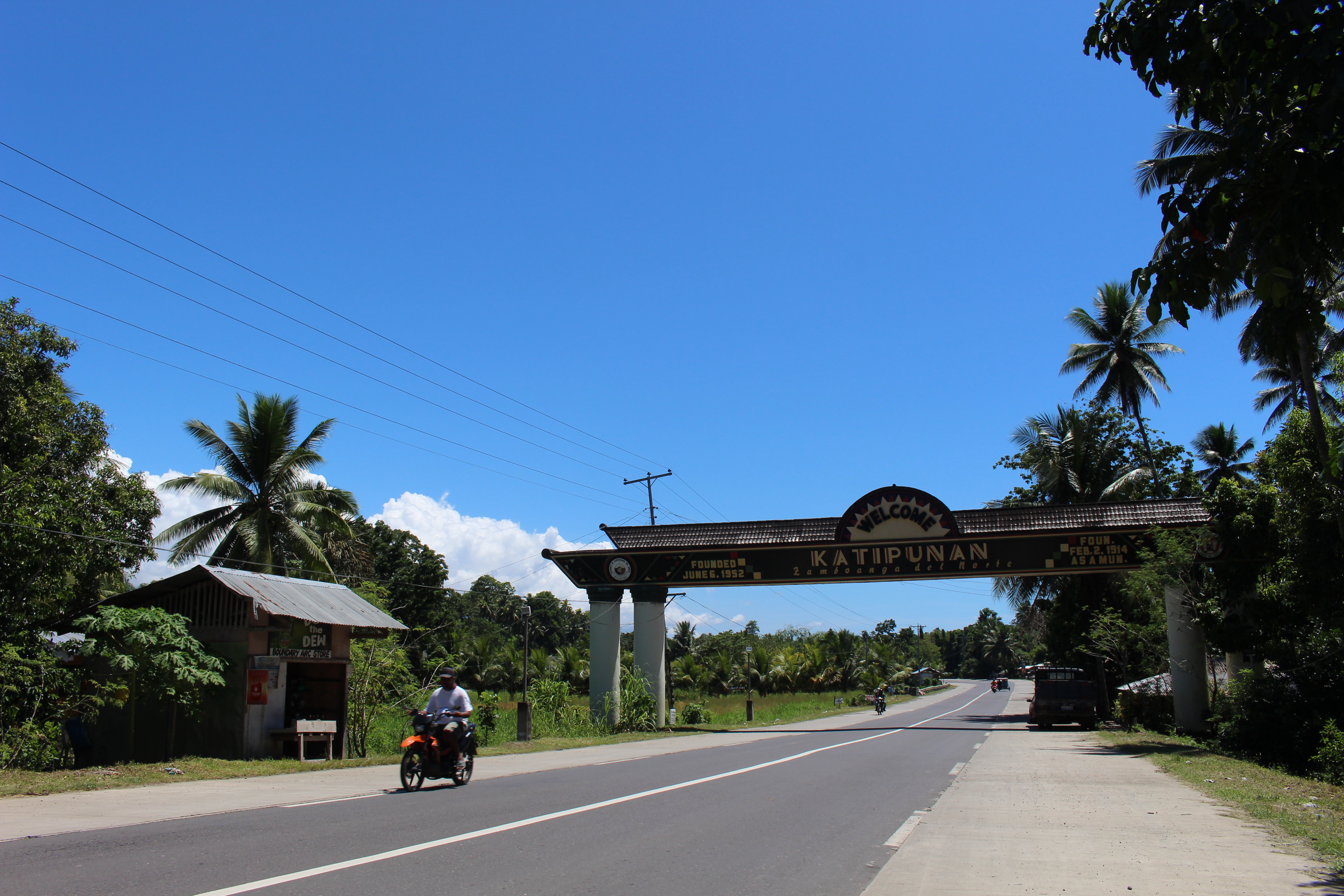
- Archway Sign of Katipunan

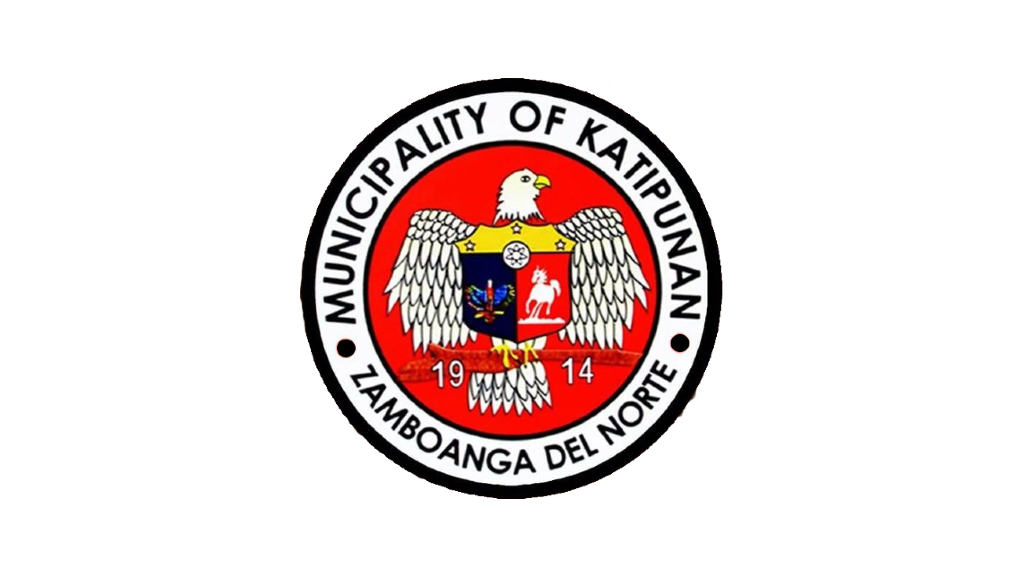
- Flag Seal
- Nickname: Adventure Capital of Zamboanga del Norte
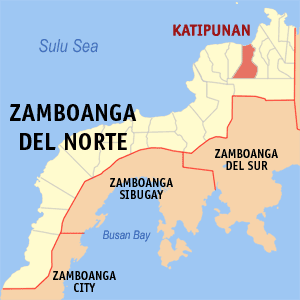
- Map of Zamboanga del Norte with Katipunan highlighted
- Interactive map of Katipunan
- Location within the Philippines
- Coordinates: 8°30′48″N 123°17′05″E
- Country: Philippines
- Region: Zamboanga Peninsula
- Province: Zamboanga del Norte
- District: 2nd district
- Founded: February 2, 1914
- Named for: Katipunan
- Barangays: 30 (see Barangays)

Government
  - Type: Sangguniang Bayan
  - Mayor: Jose Michael Meiko A. Wong (Lakas)
  - Vice Mayor: Antonio B. Jumawak (Lakas)
  - Representative: Irene G. Labadlabad (Lakas)
  - Municipal Council: Members: Jocelyn C. Ballares; Michael Vincent A. Wong; Crisostomo A. Eguia, III; Jetran L. Chipoco; Luzvina M. Sumiton; Evangeline B. Pailaga; Ruel G. Sialon; Lourdes Gale R. Wong
  - Electorate: 33,964 voters (2025)

Area
  - Total: 244.12 km^{2} (94.26 sq mi)
- Elevation: 19 m (62 ft)
- Highest elevation: 137 m (449 ft)
- Lowest elevation: 0 m (0 ft)

Population (2024 census)
  - Total: 43,427
  - Density: 177.89/km^{2} (460.74/sq mi)
  - Households: 10,750

Economy
  - Income class: 1st municipal income class
  - Poverty incidence: 49.67% (2023)
  - Revenue: ₱ 230.7 million (2024)
  - Assets: ₱ 533.6 million (2024)
  - Expenditure: ₱ 119.3 million (2024)
  - Liabilities: ₱ 133.9 million (2024)

Service provider
  - Electricity: Zamboanga del Norte Electric Cooperative (ZANECO)
- Time zone: UTC+8 (PST)
- ZIP code: 7109
- PSGC: 0907203000
- IDD : area code: +63 (0)65
- Native languages: Subanon; Cebuano; Chavacano; Tagalog
- Website: katipunan.gov.ph

Katipunan, officially the Municipality of Katipunan (Cebuano: Lungsod sa Katipunan; Subanen: Benwa Katipunan; Chavacano: Municipalidad de Katipunan; Tagalog: Bayan ng Katipunan), is a municipality in the province of Zamboanga del Norte, Philippines. According to the 2024 census, it has a population of 43,427 people.

It is formerly known as Lubungan.

== History ==
Jose Rizal, Philippine national hero, had a farm here during his exile in Dapitan from 1892-1896.

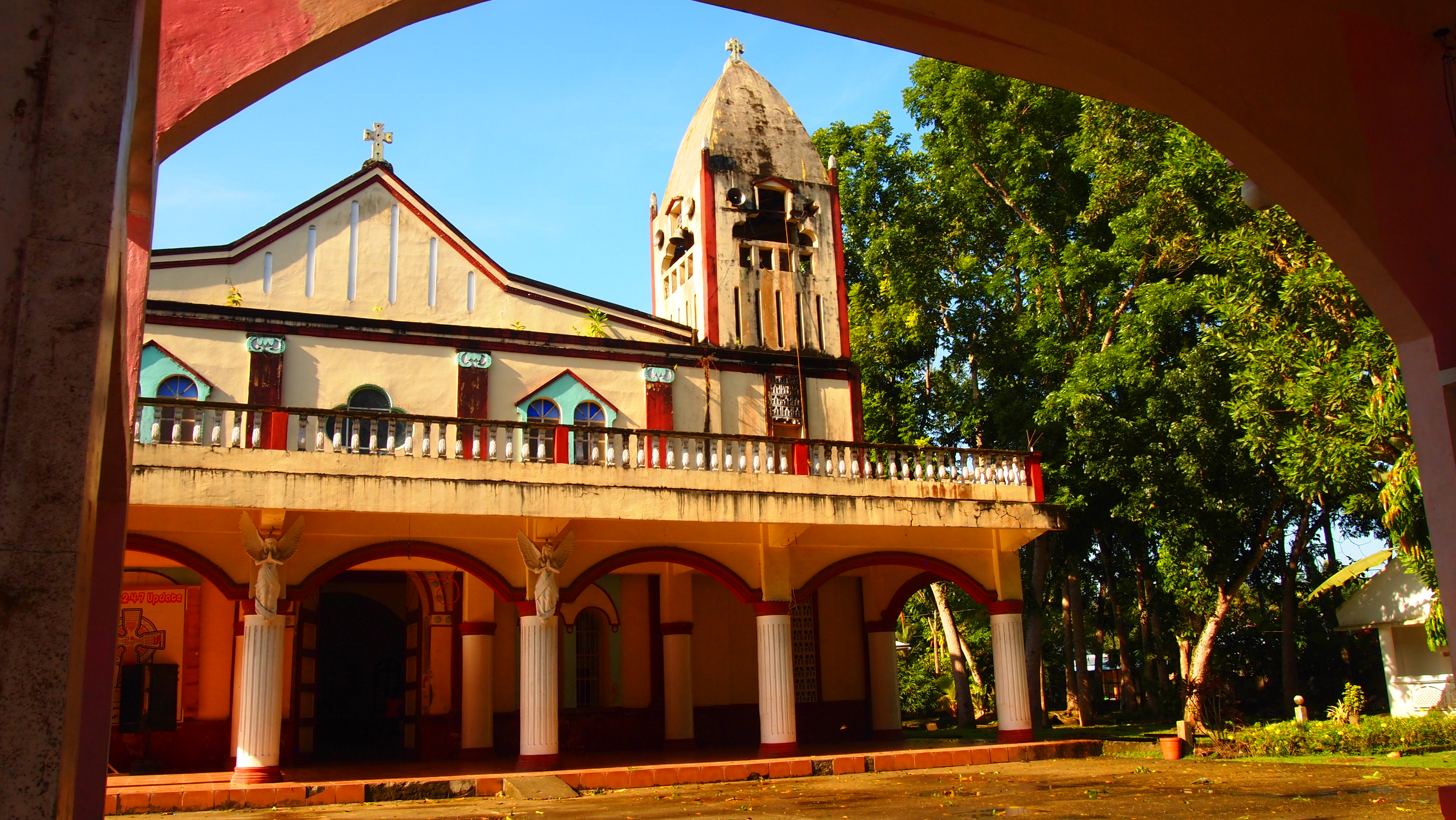
St. Francis Xavier Church

In 1955, six barrios were created:

- sitios of Malobog, Malupis, Linasan Manok, Gakol, Gimakan, Lipakan and Capasi as barrio Denoman;
- sitios of Boalboal, Malonglong, Lobongpre, Nanginan Upper, Larang, Lowang, Lawag, Sibog, Lindangan, Gumatob and Lumbayao as barrio Pinialan;
- sitios of Baoy, Tamara, Tamilokan, Labokan, Sinilog, Grap, Tobod, Larang, Senuelan, Sibutak, Kunalog, Sapanaga and Upper Lipoga as barrio Nanginan;
- sitios of Depog, Mate, Saloyong, Lanasan, Notap, Balangasan, Masoy, Upper Seraboc, Dapitan, Linay, Baoran, Bulaw, Siran, Kalayaw, Salay, Kalangag, Conon, Pinopoan, Dauwan, Takwas, Labob, Dabiac, Labaw, Diway, Toboy, Domala, Tolawan, Gotayan, Sirowan, Sigosoy, Dicayas, Kasaw, Denoman, Gimitan, Liliran, Sigamoc, Mosoman, Sikitan, Pierangan, Kitonoc, Parol, Karopay, Tokosawan, Nopiac, Ginokot, Lotowan, Logoc, Napangon, Gomanggay, Boyawan, Malonob, Dicayok, Silisi, Talisay, Tiyala, and Setog Proper as barrio Setog;Bod, Canibongan, Capase, Carupe, Dinoman, Dohinob, Irasan, Langatian, Mamara, Marupay, Mitotong, Moliton, Nabilid, Pilan, Pimar, Sanggay, Sebod, Sindotan, Tanayan, Tangian, and Villahermoso.

On June 17, 1967, barrios Bod, Canibongan, Capase, Carupe, Dinoman, Dohinob, Irasan, Langatian, Mamara, Marupay, Mitotong, Moliton, Nabilid, Pilan, Pimar, Sanggay, Sebod, Sindotan, Tanayan, Tangian, and Villahermoso were separated from Katipunan to form the new municipality of President Manuel A. Roxas, by virtue of Republic Act No. 5077, which was lapsed into law without President Ferdinand Marcos's signature.

== Geography ==
=== Climate ===
Climate data for Katipunan, Zamboanga del Norte
Month	Jan	Feb	Mar	Apr	May	Jun	Jul	Aug	Sep	Oct	Nov	Dec	Year
Mean daily maximum °C (°F)	29 (84)	29 (84)	30 (86)	31 (88)	30 (86)	30 (86)	29 (84)	30 (86)	30 (86)	29 (84)	29 (84)	29 (84)	30 (85)
Mean daily minimum °C (°F)	23 (73)	23 (73)	23 (73)	24 (75)	25 (77)	25 (77)	24 (75)	24 (75)	24 (75)	24 (75)	24 (75)	24 (75)	24 (75)
Average precipitation mm (inches)	104 (4.1)	76 (3.0)	92 (3.6)	97 (3.8)	199 (7.8)	238 (9.4)	195 (7.7)	193 (7.6)	178 (7.0)	212 (8.3)	171 (6.7)	110 (4.3)	1,865 (73.3)
Average rainy days	14.7	12.5	15.8	17.5	27.6	28.5	29.0	27.5	26.9	27.9	23.5	18.2	269.6
Source: Meteoblue

=== Barangays ===
Katipunan is politically subdivided into 30 barangays. Each barangay consists of puroks while some have sitios.

- Balok
- Barangay Dos (Poblacion)
- Barangay Uno (Poblacion)
- Basagan
- Biniray
- Bulawan
- Carupay
- Daanglungsod
- Dabiak
- Dr. Jose Rizal (Lower Mias)
- Fimagas
- Loyuran
- Malasay
- Malugas
- Matam
- Mias
- Miatan
- Nanginan
- New Tambo
- Patik
- San Antonio (Laoy)
- San Vicente
- Sanao
- Santo Niño
- Seres
- Seroan
- Singatong
- Sinuyak
- Sitog
- Tuburan

== Demographics ==
Population census of Katipunan

Year	Pop.	±% p.a.
1903	3,821	—
1918	12,810	+8.40%
1939	35,355	+4.95%
1948	38,230	+0.87%
1960	29,899	−2.03%
1970	23,073	−2.56%
1975	25,778	+2.25%
1980	28,532	+2.05%

Year	Pop.	±% p.a.
1990	32,871	+1.43%
1995	37,918	+2.71%
2000	37,448	−0.27%
2007	40,496	+1.09%
2010	43,339	+2.50%
2015	45,577	+0.96%
2020	44,661	−0.43%
2024	43,427	−0.67%

Source: Philippine Statistics Authority

== Economy ==
Poverty incidence of Katipunan (%)

Source: Philippine Statistics Authority

== Government ==
Mayors of the
Municipality of Katipunan
Leoncio Adaza, 1915-1919
Ubaldo Hamoy, 1919
Fernando Eguia, 1919-1922
Alfonso Lagorra, 1923-1925
Roque Gurdiel, 1925-1928
Francisco Miranda, 1928-1930
Benito Vallecer, 1930-1933
Jose C. Dalman, 1934-1937
Nicolas Limbaga, 1938-1946
Mariano Mendoza, 1946
Salvador Eguia, 1946-1948
Dioscoro Lagorra, 1949-1963
Jose Gayapa, Jr., 1964-1979
Rodolfo E. Kwan, 1979-1986
Cesar Sagario, 1986, 1987-1992
Renato Eguia, 1992-1995
Rodolfo Kwan, 1995-1998
Patchito T. Eguia, 1998-2007, 2016-2022
Crisostomo T. Eguia, Jr., 2007-2016
Jose Michael Meiko A. Wong, 2022-present

Katipunan's local government structure is composed of one mayor, one vice mayor and eight councilors, named as Sangguniang Bayan members, all elected through popular vote. Three ex officio members are added to the Sangguniang Bayan with one representing Katipunan's 30 Barangay Captains being the Association of Barangay Councils (ABC) President, one representing Katipunan's 30 Barangay Youth Council Presidents being the Sangunniang Kabataan (SK) Federation President, and one representing a group of indigenous peoples of Katipunan being the Indigenous Peoples Mandatory Representative (IPMR). Each official, with the exemption of the ABC and SK Presidents and IPMR, is elected publicly to a 3-year term and can be re-elected up to 3 terms in succession.

== Notable personalities ==
- Adolfo Sevilla Azcuna (b. February 16, 1939) - Philippine Judicial Academy (PHILJA) Chancellor (since June 1, 2009), 153rd Associate Justice of the Supreme Court of the Philippines (October 24, 2002 – February 15, 2009).
- Eddie Laure - retired professional basketball player

== See also ==
- List of renamed cities and municipalities in the Philippines
