= Laws of the 15th Congress of the Philippines =

Laws passed by 15th Congress of Philippines

The following is the list of laws passed by the 15th Congress of the Philippines:

Date approved	RA number	Title/category	Affected municipality or city	Affected province
2011-03-12	10148	Granting Citizenship to a Person		
2011-06-06	10149	GOCC Governance Act of 2011		
2011-06-21	10150	Amending the Electric Power Industry Reform Act of 2001 : Lifeline Rate Implementation		
2011-06-21	10151	Amending the Labor Code or PD 442 : Allowing Employment of Night Workers		
2011-06-21	10152	Mandatory Infants and Children Health Immunization Act of 2011 : Repealing PD 996		
2011-06-30	10153	Synchronization of ARMM Elections with the National and Local Elections		
2011-07-14	10154	Early Release of Retirement Benefits for Retiring Government Employees		
2011-12-15	10155	Appropriations Act of 2012		
2011-12-20	10156	Conferment of Civil Service Eligibility to Some Members of the Sangguniang Bayan, Sangguniang Panlungsod, and Sangguniang Panlalawigan		
2012-01-20	10157	Kindergarten Education Act		
2012-03-27	10158	Amending the Revised Penal Code or Act 3815 : Decriminalizing Vagrancy		
2012-04-10	10159	Amending the Revised Penal Code or Act 3815		
2012-04-10	10160	Converting a Municipality into a Component City	Bacoor	Cavite
2012-04-10	10161	Converting a Municipality into a Component City	Imus	Cavite
2012-04-17	10162	Creating additional Branches of the Regional Trial Court	Santa Rosa	Laguna
2012-05-16	10163	Converting a Municipality into a Component City	Cabuyao	Laguna
2012-05-15	10164	Converting a Municipality into a Component City	Mabalacat	Pampanga
2012-06-11	10165	Foster Care Act of 2012		
2012-06-11	10166	Geology Profession Act of 2012 : Repealing RA 4209		
2012-06-06	10167	Amending the Anti-Money Laundering Law		
2012-06-20	10168	Terrorism Financing Prevention and Suppression Act of 2012		
2012-06-21	10169	Converting a Municipality into a Component City	Ilagan	Isabela
2012-07-02	10170	Reapportioning Legislative Districts of Quezon City	Quezon City	National Capital Region (NCR)
2012-07-19	10171	Reapportioning Legislative Districts of a Province	[Second] Balabac, Bataraza, Brooke's Point, Narra, [Quezon, Rizal, and Sofronio Española; [Third] Puerto Princesa, and Aborlan	Palawan
2012-08-15	10172	Amending RA 9048 : Correcting Typographical Errors in the Civil Register		
2012-08-15	10173	Data Privacy Act of 2012		
2012-08-16	10174	Amending the Climate Change Act of 2009 : Establishing the People's Survival Fund		
2012-09-12	10175	Cybercrime Prevention Act of 2012		
2012-09-12	10176	Arbor Day Act of 2012		
2012-09-14	10177	Reapportioning Legislative Districts of a Province	[First] Pikit, Pigcawayan, Alamada, Libungan, Midsayap, and Aleosan; [Second] Kidapawan, Makilala, Magpet, President Roxas, Antipas, and Arakan; [Third] Banilisan, Carmen, Kabacan, Matalam, M'lang, and Tulunan	Cotabato
2012-09-21	10178	Radio and Television Broadcasting Franchise : Reliance Broadcasting Unlimited, Inc		
2012-09-21	10179	Radio and Television Broadcasting Franchise		Davao del Sur
2012-09-21	10180	Radio and Television Broadcasting Franchise		Nueva Vizcaya
2012-09-21	10181	Television Broadcasting Franchise : TV Maria Foundation Philippines, Inc		
2012-09-21	10182	Telecommunications Franchise : Telecommunications Technology Solutions, Inc		
2012-09-21	10183	Telecommunications Franchise : Wi-Trive Telecoms, Inc		
2012-09-28	10184	Reapportioning Legislative Districts of a Province		Bukidnon
2012-10-18	10185	Converting a High School Annex into an Independent National High School	Tigbauan	Iloilo
2012-10-18	10186	Converting a High School Annex into an Independent National High School	San Joaquin	Iloilo
2012-10-18	10187	Establishing a National High School	Pilar	Sorsogon
2012-10-18	10188	Establishing a National High School	Magallanes	Sorsogon
2012-10-18	10189	Establishing a National High School	San Jose Del Monte City	Bulacan
2012-10-18	10190	Converting a High School Annex into an Independent National High School	Daanbantayan	Cebu
2012-10-18	10191	Converting a High School Annex into an Independent National High School	Bislig	Surigao del Sur
2012-10-18	10192	Converting a High School Annex into an Independent National High School	Roxas	Zamboanga del Norte
2012-10-18	10193	Converting a High School Annex into an Independent National High School	Katipunan	Zamboanga del Norte
2012-10-18	10194	Converting a High School Annex into an Independent National High School	Banaybanay	Davao Oriental
2012-10-18	10195	Establishing a National High School	Maria Aurora	Aurora
2012-10-18	10196	Converting a High School Annex into an Independent National High School	Koronadal	South Cotabato
2012-10-18	10197	Converting a High School into a National High School	Tagbina	Surigao del Sur
2012-10-18	10198	Establishing a National High School	Banaybanay	Davao Oriental
2012-10-18	10199	Converting a High School Annex into an Independent National High School	Castilla	Sorsogon
2012-10-18	10200	Converting a High School Annex into an Independent National High School	Bislig	Surigao del Sur
2012-10-18	10201	Establishing a National High School	Tadian	Mountain Province
2012-10-18	10202	Converting a High School Annex into an Independent National High School	Tambulig	Zamboanga del Sur
2012-10-18	10203	Establishing a National High School	Dimataling	Zamboanga del Sur
2012-10-18	10204	Converting a High School Annex into an Independent National High School	Paracelis	Mountain Province
2012-10-18	10205	Converting a High School Annex into an Independent National High School	Valenzuela	NCR
2012-10-18	10206	Converting a High School Annex into an Independent National High School	Oton	Iloilo
2012-10-18	10207	Converting a High School Annex into an Independent National High School	Siayan	Zamboanga del Norte
2012-10-18	10208	Converting a High School Annex into an Independent National High School	Katipunan	Zamboanga del Norte
2012-10-18	10209	Converting a High School Annex into an Independent National High School	Sagada	Mountain Province
2012-10-18	10210	Establishing a National High School	Bato	Leyte
2012-10-18	10211	Establishing a National High School	Mabini	Batangas
2012-10-18	10212	Converting a High School Annex into an Independent National High School	Pili	Camarines Sur
2012-10-18	10213	Converting a High School Annex into an Independent National High School	Mati	Davao Oriental
2012-10-18	10214	Converting a High School Annex into an Independent National High School	Pagadian	Zamboanga del Sur
2012-10-18	10215	Establishing a National High School	Sindangan	Zamboanga del Norte
2012-10-18	10216	Establishing a National High School	Marikina	NCR
2012-10-18	10217	Converting a High School Annex into an Independent National High School	Tambulig	Zamboanga del Sur
2012-10-18	10218	Establishing a National High School	Sindangan	Zamboanga del Norte
2012-10-18	10219	Converting a High School Annex into an Independent National High School	Bislig	Surigao del Sur
2012-10-18	10220	Converting a High School Annex into an Independent National High School	Bislig	Surigao del Sur
2012-10-18	10221	Establishing a National High School	Kasibu	Nueva Vizcaya
2012-10-18	10222	Converting a High School Annex into an Independent National High School	Santa Margarita	Samar
2012-10-18	10223	Establishing an Elementary School	Pontevedra	Capiz
2012-10-18	10224	Establishing a National High School	San Jose Del Monte City	Bulacan
2012-10-18	10225	Converting a High School Annex into an Independent National High School	Dumingag	Zamboanga del Sur
2012-10-18	10226	Converting a High School Annex into an Independent National High School	Molave	Zamboanga del Sur
2012-10-18	10227	Renaming an Educational Institution	Aparri	Cagayan
2012-10-18	10228	Converting a State College into a State University	Kabankalan	Negros Occidental
2012-10-19	10229	Converting a State College into a State University	Panganiban	Catanduanes
2012-10-19	10230	Integrating State Colleges into a State University		Quirino
2012-10-19	10231	Converting a State College Campus into a Separate State College	Naga	Camarines Sur
2012-10-29	10232	Establishing a National High School	Mati	Davao Oriental
2012-10-29	10233	Converting a High School Annex into an Independent National High School	Tadian	Mountain Province
2012-10-29	10234	Establishing a National High School	Mahinog	Camiguin
2012-10-29	10235	Establishing a National High School	San Jose Del Monte City	Bulacan
2012-10-29	10236	Converting a High School Annex into an Independent National High School	Bislig	Surigao del Sur
2012-10-29	10237	Converting a High School Annex into an Independent National High School	Santa Fe	Nueva Vizcaya
2012-10-29	10238	Converting a National High School into a National Science High School	Calabanga	Camarines Sur
2012-10-29	10239	Converting a High School Annex into an Independent National High School	Calabanga	Camarines Sur
2012-10-29	10240	Establishing a National High School	Castilla	Sorsogon
2012-10-29	10241	Converting a High School Annex into an Independent National High School	Pinukpuk	Kalinga
2012-10-29	10242	Converting a High School Annex into an Independent National High School	Tabuk	Kalinga
2012-11-08	10243	Creating additional Branches of the Regional Trial Court	Davao City	Davao del Sur
2012-11-08	10244	Creating additional Branches of the Regional Trial Court	Tacloban	Leyte
2012-11-08	10245	Creating additional Branches of the Regional Trial Court	Barotac Viejo	Iloilo
2012-11-08	10246	Creating an additional Branch of the Regional Trial Court	Bislig	Surigao del Sur
2012-11-08	10247	Creating an additional Branch of the Regional Trial Court	Sagay	Negros Occidental
2012-11-08	10248	Creating an additional Branch of the Regional Trial Court	Guimbal	Iloilo
2012-11-08	10249	Creating an additional Branch of the Regional Trial Court	Carmona	Cavite
2012-11-08	10250	Creating additional Branches of the Regional Trial Court	Bago and La Carlota	Negros Occidental
2012-11-08	10251	Creating additional Branches of the Metropolitan Trial Court	Muntinlupa	NCR
2012-11-08	10252	Creating additional Branches of the Regional Trial Court	Compostela & Mabini	Compostela Valley
2012-11-08	10253	Creating additional Branches of the Municipal Trial Court	Puerto Princesa	Palawan
2012-11-08	10254	Creating additional Branches of the Municipal Trial Court	Cagayan de Oro	Misamis Oriental
2012-11-15	10255	Establishing a National High School	Lupon	Davao Oriental
2012-11-15	10256	Establishing a National High School	San Jose Del Monte City	Bulacan
2012-11-15	10257	Establishing a National High School	Tadian	Mountain Province
2012-11-15	10258	Converting a High School Annex into an Independent National High School	Bislig	Surigao del Sur
2012-11-15	10259	Converting a High School Annex into an Independent National High School	Tagbina	Surigao del Sur
2012-11-15	10260	Converting a High School Annex into an Independent National High School	Calabanga	Camarines Sur
2012-11-15	10261	Converting a High School Annex into an Independent National High School	Magallanes	Sorsogon
2012-11-15	10262	Converting a High School Annex into an Independent National High School	Midsalip	Zamboanga del Sur
2012-11-15	10263	Converting a High School Annex into an Independent National High School	Hinatuan	Surigao del Sur
2012-11-15	10264	Converting a High School Annex into an Independent National High School	Pinukpuk	Kalinga
2012-11-15	10265	Establishing a National High School	Vintar	Ilocos Norte
2012-11-15	10266	Establishing a National High School	Roxas	Zamboanga del Norte
2012-11-15	10267	Converting a National High School into a Regional Science High School	Cagayan de Oro	Misamis Oriental
2012-11-15	10268	Establishing a National High School	Mayantoc	Tarlac
2012-11-15	10269	Establishing a National High School	Dinas	Zamboanga del Sur
2012-11-15	10270	Establishing a National High School	Agoo	La Union
2012-11-15	10271	Converting a High School Annex into an Independent National High School	Payao	Zamboanga Sibugay
2012-11-15	10272	Converting a High School Annex into an Independent National High School	Surallah	South Cotabato
2012-11-15	10273	Converting a High School Annex into an Independent National High School	Paracelis	Mountain Province
2012-11-15	10274	Converting a High School Annex into an Independent National High School	Palompon	Leyte
2012-11-15	10275	Converting a High School Annex into an Independent National High School	San Jose	Occidental Mindoro
2012-11-15	10276	Establishing a National High School	Marikina	NCR
2012-11-15	10277	Converting a High School Annex into an Independent National High School	Natonin	Mountain Province
2012-11-15	10278	Converting a High School Annex into an Independent National High School	Sumilao	Bukidnon
2012-11-15	10279	Converting a High School Annex into an Independent National High School	Surigao City	Surigao del Norte
2012-11-15	10280	Changing the Name of a National High School	Orion	Bataan
2012-11-15	10281	Changing the Name of an Elementary School	Valenzuela City	NCR
2012-11-15	10282	Establishing a High School Annex	Davao City	Davao del Sur
2012-11-15	10283	Changing the Name of a National High School	Sagay	Camiguin
2012-11-14	10284	Establishing a National Science High School	Pili	Camarines Sur
2012-11-14	10285	Converting a High School Annex into an Independent National High School	Ocampo	Camarines Sur
2012-11-14	10286	Converting a High School Annex into an Independent National High School	Pili	Camarines Sur
2012-11-14	10287	Converting a High School Annex into an Independent National High School	Dumingag	Zamboanga del Sur
2012-11-14	10288	Converting a High School Annex into an Independent National High School	Katipunan	Zamboanga del Norte
2012-11-14	10289	Converting a High School Annex into an Independent National High School	Pinukpuk	Kalinga
2012-11-14	10290	Establishing a National High School	Tacloban	Leyte
2012-11-14	10291	Establishing an Integrated School	Sorsogon City	Sorsogon
2012-11-14	10292	Establishing a National High School	Besao	Mountain Province
2012-11-14	10293	Converting a High School Annex into an Independent National High School	Aurora	Zamboanga del Sur
2012-11-14	10294	Converting a High School Annex into an Independent National High School	Libmanan	Camarines Sur
2012-11-14	10295	Converting a High School Annex into an Independent National High School	Pamplona	Camarines Sur
2012-11-14	10296	Converting a High School Annex into an Independent National High School	Surigao City	Surigao del Norte
2012-11-14	10297	Converting a High School Annex into an Independent National High School	Valenzuela City	NCR
2012-11-15	10298	Creating an additional Branch of the Regional Trial Court	Lubuagan	Kalinga
2012-11-15	10299	Creating additional Branches of the Regional Trial Court and the Metropolitan Trial Court	Navotas	NCR
2012-11-15	10300	Creating an additional Branch of the Regional Trial Court	Cajidiocan	Romblon
2012-11-15	10301	Creating additional Branches of the Regional Trial Court	Zamboanga City	Zamboanga del Norte
2012-11-15	10302	Creating additional Branches of the Regional Trial Court	Tanauan	Batangas
2012-11-15	10303	Creating additional Branches of the Regional Trial Court	Casiguran	Aurora
2012-11-15	10304	Converting an Elementary School into an Integrated School	Sagay	Camiguin
2012-11-15	10305	Converting a High School Annex into an Independent National High School	Naga	Camarines Sur
2012-11-15	10306	Establishing an Integrated School	Sorsogon City	Sorsogon
2012-11-15	10307	Establishing a National High School	Pilar	Sorsogon
2012-11-15	10308	Converting a High School into a National High School	Tinambac	Camarines Sur
2012-11-15	10309	Establishing a National High School	Barcelona	Sorsogon
2012-11-15	10310	Establishing a National High School	Mati	Davao Oriental
2012-11-15	10311	Establishing a National High School	Liloan	Southern Leyte
2012-11-15	10312	Converting a National High School into a National Vocational High School	Bauang	La Union
2012-11-15	10313	Establishing a National High School	Dumalinao	Zamboanga del Sur
2012-11-15	10314	Establishing a National High School	San Miguel	Zamboanga del Sur
2012-11-15	10315	Establishing a National High School	Dinas	Zamboanga del Sur
2012-11-15	10316	Converting a High School Annex into an Independent National High School	Rizal	Occidental Mindoro
2012-11-15	10317	Converting a High School Annex into an Independent National High School	Calintaan	Occidental Mindoro
2012-11-15	10318	Converting a High School Annex into an Independent National High School	Lagonoy	Camarines Sur
2012-11-15	10319	Establishing a High School Annex	Sumilao	Bukidnon
2012-11-15	10320	Converting a High School Annex into an Independent National High School	Surigao City	Surigao del Norte
2012-11-15	10321	Establishing a National High School	Maasin	Southern Leyte
2012-11-15	10322	Establishing a High School Annex	Baungon	Bukidnon
2012-11-15	10323	Converting a High School Annex into an Independent National High School	Josefina	Zamboanga del Sur
2012-11-15	10324	Converting a High School Annex into an Independent National High School	San Jose	Nueva Ecija
2012-11-15	10325	Converting a High School Annex into an Independent National High School	Carigara	Leyte
2012-11-15	10326	Converting a High School Annex into an Independent National High School	Libmanan	Camarines Sur
2012-11-15	10327	Converting a High School Annex into an Independent National High School	Libmanan	Camarines Sur
2012-11-15	10328	Converting a High School Annex into an Independent National High School : Mantalisay National High School	Libmanan	Camarines Sur
2012-11-15	10329	Converting a High School Annex into an Independent National High School	Minalabac	Camarines Sur
2012-11-15	10330	Converting a High School Annex into an Independent National High School : Pinamasagan National High School	San Fernando	Camarines Sur
2012-11-15	10331	Converting a High School Annex into an Independent National High School : Gubaan National High School	San Fernando	
2012-11-15	10332	Converting a High School Annex into an Independent National High School	Mahayag	Zamboanga del Sur
2012-11-15	10333	Changing the Name of a National High School	Odiongan	Romblon
2012-11-15	10334	Converting a High School Annex into an Independent National High School	Pasacao	Camarines Sur
2012-11-15	10335	Establishing an Elementary School	Mandaluyong	NCR
2012-11-15	10336	Establishing an Integrated School	Mandaluyong	NCR
2012-11-21	10337	Converting an Extension Office into a Regular Office (LTO)	Samal	Davao del Norte
2012-11-21	10338	Converting an Extension Office into a Regular Office (LTO)	Dasmariñas	Cavite
2012-11-21	10339	Creating additional Branches of the Regional Trial Court	Calamba, Los Baños, and Cabuyao	Laguna
2012-11-21	10340	Creating additional Branches of the Regional Trial Court	Bogo	Cebu
2012-11-21	10341	Creating additional Branches of the Regional Trial Court and the Metropolitan Trial Court	Valenzuela City	NCR
2012-12-04	10342	Radio Broadcasting Franchise : Quest Broadcasting, Inc		
2012-12-04	10343	Telecommunications Franchise : Philippine Global Communications, Inc		
2012-12-04	10344	Risk Reduction and Preparedness Equipment Protection Act		
2012-12-04	10345	Increasing Bed Capacity of a Hospital	Quezon City	NCR
2012-12-04	10346	Converting an Extension Office into a Regular Office (LTO)	Tubod	Lanao del Norte
2012-12-04	10347	Converting an Extension Office into a Regular Office (LTO)	Luna	Apayao
2012-12-06	10348	Creating additional Branches of the Regional Trial Court	Carcar and Naga	Cebu
2012-12-11	10349	Amending the AFP Modernization Act or RA 7898		
2012-12-17	10350	Philippine Interior Design Act of 2012 : Repealing RA 8534		
2012-12-19	10351	Amending the National Internal Revenue Code of 1997 or RA 8424 : Restructuring the Excise Tax on Alcohol and Tobacco Products		
2012-12-19	10352	Appropriations Act of 2013		
2012-12-21	10353	Anti-Enforced or Involuntary Disappearance Act of 2012		
2012-12-21	10354	Responsible Parenthood and Reproductive Health Act of 2012		
2013-01-09	10355	Increasing Bed Capacity of a Hospital	San Fernando	Pampanga
2013-01-09	10356	Granting Citizenship to a Person : Jessie Josephine Coe Lichauco		
2013-01-09	10357	Declaring Every September 5 a Special Working Holiday in Naga City in Commemoration of its Foundation	Naga	Cebu
2013-01-09	10358	Declaring Every July 7 a Special Working Holiday in Carcar City in Commemoration of its Foundation	Carcar	Cebu
2013-01-09	10359	Declaring Every March 26 a Special Working Holiday in Cebu Province in Commemoration of its Liberation from Japanese Occupation		Cebu
2013-01-09	10360	Creating a Province		Davao Occidental
2013-01-18	10361	Domestic Workers Act		
2013-01-23	10362	Creating additional Branches of the Regional Trial Court	Trento	Agusan del Sur
2013-01-28	10363	Creating additional Branches of the Regional Trial Court	Mandaue	Cebu
2013-02-06	10364	Expanded Anti-Trafficking in Persons Act of 2012		
2013-02-15	10365	Amending the Anti-Money Laundering Act or R.A. 9160		
2013-02-15	10366	COMELEC on Precincts for PWD and Senior Citizens		
2013-02-15	10367	Mandatory Biometrics in Voter Registration		
2013-02-25	10368	Reparation and Recognition of Victims of Human Rights Violations During the Marcos Regime		
2013-02-28	10369	Reconstituting a District Engineering Office into Two District Offices		Kalinga
2013-02-28	10370	Establishing a Municipal Circuit Trial Court	Buenavista, San Lorenzo	Guimaras
2013-02-28	10371	Creating an additional Branch of the Regional Trial Court	Sipalay	Negros Occidental
2013-02-28	10372	Amending the Intellectual Property Code or RA 8293		
2013-03-01	10373	Electric Power Distribution Franchise : Olongapo Electricity Distribution Company, Inc.		Zambales
2013-03-05	10374	Amending the Agricultural Land Reform Code or RA 3844 : Extending the Life of the Land Bank of the Philippines		
2013-03-05	10375	Converting a Road into National Road		Mountain Province
2013-03-05	10376	Zamboanga del Norte Electric Cooperative, Inc – Condoning Interest Payable to National Power Corporation		Zamboanga del Norte
2013-03-05	10377	Transferring Location of a District Engineering Office	Agoo	La Union
2013-03-07	10378	Amending the National Internal Revenue Code of 1997 or RA 8424 : Recognizing the Principle of Reciprocity on Income Tax Exemptions to International Carriers		
2013-03-08	10379	Establishing a District Engineering Office		Mountain Province
2013-03-14	10380	Local Absentee Voting for Media		
2013-03-14	10381	Creating additional Branches of the Metropolitan Trial Court	Taguig	NCR
2013-03-14	10382	Converting a Road into National Road		Tarlac
2013-03-14	10383	Converting a Road into National Road		Capiz
2013-03-14	10384	Converting a Road into National Road	Baguio	Benguet
2013-03-14	10385	Converting a Road into National Road	Marikina	NCR
2013-03-14	10386	Converting a Road into National Road		Tarlac
2013-03-14	10387	Converting a Road into National Road	Iloilo City	Iloilo
2013-03-14	10388	Converting an Extension Office into a Regular Office (LTO	Paniqui	Tarlac
2013-03-14	10389	Recognizance Act of 2012		
2013-03-14	10390	Amending RA 7306 : Revitalizing the People's Television Network, Inc Act		
2013-03-14	10391	Converting an Extension Office into a Regular Office (LTO)	Dapa	Surigao del Norte
2013-03-14	10392	Creating additional Branches of the Regional Trial Court	Janiuay	Iloilo
2013-03-14	10393	Creating additional Branches of the Regional Trial Court	General Santos	South Cotabato
2013-03-14	10394	Converting Branches of the Regional Trial Court of Pasig City into the Regional Trial Court of Taguig City	Taguig	NCR
2013-03-14	10395	Amending the Labor Code or PD 442 : Strengthening Tripartism		
2013-03-14	10396	Amending the Labor Code or PD 442 : Strengthening Conciliation-Mediation		
2013-03-16	10397	Converting a Provincial Road to National Road	Bacoor	Cavite
2013-03-19	10398	Declaring Every November 25 as the “National Consciousness Day for the Elimination of Violence Against Women and Children”		
2013-03-19	10399	Converting a Road into National Road	Baguio	Benguet
2013-03-19	10400	Converting a Road into National Road	Iloilo City	Iloilo
2013-03-19	10401	Converting a Road into National Road	Baguio	Benguet
2013-03-19	10402	Converting a Provincial Road to National Road	Solana	Cagayan
2013-03-19	10403	Converting a Road into National Road	Iloilo City	Iloilo
2013-03-19	10404	Converting a Road into National Road	Marikina	NCR
2013-03-19	10405	Converting a Road into National Road		Ilocos Norte
2013-03-19	10406	Converting a Provincial Road to National Road		Benguet
2013-03-19	10407	Converting a Provincial Road to National Road	Roxas City	Capiz
2013-03-19	10408	Converting a Road into National Road	Valenzuela City	NCR
2013-03-19	10409	A Tourism Development Area		Biliran
2013-03-26	10410	Early Years Act of 2013		
2013-03-26	10411	Converting a Road into National Road	Abuyog	Leyte
2013-03-26	10412	Converting a Provincial Road to National Road		Cagayan
2013-03-26	10413	Converting a Road into National Road		Apayao
2013-03-26	10414	Converting a Road into National Road		Tarlac
2013-03-26	10415	Converting a Road into National Road	Marikina	NCR
2013-03-26	10416	Converting a Road into National Road	Iloilo City	Iloilo
2013-03-26	10417	Converting a Road into National Road	Iloilo City	Iloilo
2013-03-26	10418	Converting a Road into National Road	Marikina	NCR
2013-03-26	10419	Converting a Road into National Road	La Trinidad	Benguet
2013-03-26	10420	Converting a Municipality into a Component City	San Pedro	Laguna
2013-04-08	10421	Establishing a National High School	Naga	Cebu
2013-04-08	10422	Converting a High School Annex into an Independent National High School	Pikit	North Cotabato
2013-04-08	10423	Converting a High School Annex into an Independent National High School	Malaybalay	Bukidnon
2013-04-08	10424	Converting a High School Annex into an Independent National High School	Malaybalay	Bukidnon
2013-04-08	10425	Converting a High School Annex into an Independent National High School	Hinatuan	Surigao del Sur
2013-04-08	10426	Establishing a National High School	Minglanilla	Cebu
2013-04-08	10427	Establishing a Primary School	Naga	Cebu
2013-04-08	10428	Converting a High School Annex into an Independent National High School	Gingoog	Misamis Oriental
2013-04-08	10429	Converting a High School Annex into an Independent National High School	Valencia	Bukidnon
2013-04-08	10430	Converting a High School Annex into an Independent National High School	Asipulo	Ifugao
2013-04-08	10431	Converting a High School Annex into an Independent National High School	Tabuk	Kalinga
2013-04-08	10432	Converting a High School Annex into an Independent National High School	Pinukpuk	Kalinga
2013-04-08	10433	Converting a High School Annex into an Independent National High School	Cantilan	Surigao del Sur
2013-04-08	10434	Establishing a National High School	Maasin	Southern Leyte
2013-04-08	10435	Converting a High School Annex into an Independent National High School	Iligan City	Lanao del Norte
2013-04-08	10436	Converting a High School Annex into an Independent National High School	Iligan City	Lanao del Norte
2013-04-08	10437	Establishing a National High School	San Pablo	Zamboanga del Sur
2013-04-08	10438	Converting a High School Annex into an Independent National High School	Libmanan	Camarines Sur
2013-04-08	10439	Changing the Name of a National High School	Valenzuela City	NCR
2013-04-08	10440	Converting a High School into a National High School	Santa Maria	Bulacan
2013-04-08	10441	Converting a High School Annex into an Independent National High School	Iligan City	Lanao del Norte
2013-04-08	10442	Converting a High School Annex into an Independent National High School	Daanbantayan	Cebu
2013-04-08	10443	Converting a High School Annex into an Independent National High School	Magdiwang	Romblon
2013-04-08	10444	Converting a High School Annex into an Independent National High School	Tanudan	Kalinga
2013-04-08	10445	Converting a High School Annex into an Independent National High School	Compostela	Compostela Valley
2013-04-08	10446	Converting a High School Annex into an Independent National High School	Pasil	Kalinga
2013-04-08	10447	Converting a High School Annex into an Independent National High School	Baguio	Benguet
2013-04-08	10448	Converting a High School Annex into an Independent National High School	Baguio	Benguet
2013-04-08	10449	Converting a High School Annex into an Independent National High School	Baguio	Benguet
2013-04-08	10450	Converting a High School Annex into an Independent National High School	San Pablo	Laguna
2013-04-08	10451	Establishing the Bikol Botanical Garden		Camarines Sur
2013-04-08	10452	Reforesting 3,000 Hectares of Public Land	Cagayan de Oro	Misamis Oriental
2013-04-08	10453	Converting a Road into National Road	Iloilo City	Iloilo
2013-04-08	10454	Creating additional Branches to the Regional Trial Court and the Municipal Trial Court		Cavite
2013-04-08	10455	Establishing a National High School	Carcar	Cebu
2013-04-11	10456	Establishing a Separate City Schools Division Office	Talisay	Negros Occidental
2013-04-11	10457	Converting a Road into National Road	La Paz	Iloilo
2013-04-16	10458	Establishing a National High School	Carcar	Cebu
2013-04-16	10459	Establishing a National High School	Carcar	Cebu
2013-04-16	10460	Establishing a Primary School	Naga	Cebu
2013-04-16	10461	Establishing a National High School	Navotas	NCR
2013-04-16	10462	Establishing a National High School	Naga	Cebu
2013-04-16	10463	Converting a High School Annex into an Independent National High School	Pinukpuk	Kalinga
2013-04-16	10464	Establishing a National High School	Pasig	NCR
2013-04-16	10465	Converting a High School Annex into an Independent National High School	Looc	Romblon
2013-04-16	10466	Converting a High School Annex into a National Science High School	Malaybalay	Bukidnon
2013-04-16	10467	Establishing a National High School	Kumalarang	Zamboanga del Sur
2013-04-16	10468	Establishing a National High School	Guipos	Zamboanga del Sur
2013-04-16	10469	Establishing a National High School	Danao	Cebu
2013-04-16	10470	Converting a High School Annex into an Independent National High School	Pantukan	Compostela Valley
2013-04-16	10471	Changing the Name of a National High School	Bacolod	Negros Occidental
2013-04-16	10472	Changing the Name of a National High School	Calapan	Oriental Mindoro
2013-04-16	10473	Converting a High School Annex into an Independent National High School	Iligan City	Lanao del Norte
2013-04-16	10474	Converting a High School Annex into an Independent National High School	San Agustin	Romblon
2013-04-16	10475	Converting a High School Annex into an Independent National High School	Pasil	Kalinga
2013-04-16	10476	Converting a High School Annex into an Independent National High School	Baguio	Benguet
2013-04-16	10477	Converting a High School Annex into an Independent National High School	Baguio	Benguet
2013-04-16	10478	Converting a High School Annex into an Independent National High School	Baguio	Benguet
2013-04-16	10479	Converting a High School Annex into an Independent National High School	Baguio	Benguet
2013-04-16	10480	Creating additional Branches of the Metropolitan Trial Court	Quezon City	NCR
2013-04-16	10481	Establishing a National High School	San Fernando	Cebu
2013-04-16	10482	Establishing a National High School	Quezon	Nueva Vizcaya
2013-04-16	10483	Establishing a Primary School	Naga	Cebu
2013-04-16	10484	Converting a High School Annex into an Independent National High School	Pikit	North Cotabato
2013-04-16	10485	Converting a High School Annex into an Independent National High School	Midsayap	North Cotabato
2013-04-16	10486	Converting a High School Annex into an Independent National High School	Tabuk	Kalinga
2013-04-16	10487	Converting a High School Annex into an Independent National High School	Valencia	Bukidnon
2013-04-16	10488	Converting a High School Annex into an Independent National High School	Malaybalay	Bukidnon
2013-04-16	10489	Converting a High School Annex into an Independent National High School	Valencia	Bukidnon
2013-04-16	10490	Establishing a National High School	Naga	Cebu
2013-04-16	10491	Converting a High School Annex into an Independent National High School	Pamplona	Camarines Sur
2013-04-16	10492	Converting a High School Annex into an Independent National High School	Valencia	Bukidnon
2013-04-16	10493	Converting a High School Annex into an Independent National High School	Gingoog	Misamis Oriental
2013-04-16	10494	Converting a High School Annex into an Independent National High School	Gingoog	Misamis Oriental
2013-04-16	10495	Establishing a National High School	Carcar	Cebu
2013-04-16	10496	Converting a High School Annex into an Independent National High School	Tabuk	Kalinga
2013-04-16	10497	Establishing a National High School	Maria Aurora	Aurora
2013-04-16	10498	Converting a High School Annex into an Independent National High School	Surigao City	Surigao del Norte
2013-04-16	10499	Establishing a National High School	Malolos	Bulacan
2013-04-16	10500	Converting a High School Annex into an Independent National High School	Iligan City	Lanao del Norte
2013-04-16	10501	Establishing a National High School	Tabina	Zamboanga del Sur
2013-04-16	10502	Converting a High School Annex into an Independent National High School	Tukuran	Zamboanga del Sur
2013-04-16	10503	Converting a High School Annex into an Independent National High School	Burgos	La Union
2013-04-16	10504	Converting a High School Annex into an Independent National High School	Davao City	Davao del Sur
2013-04-16	10505	Converting a High School Annex into an Independent National High School	Nabunturan	Compostela Valley
2013-04-16	10506	Converting a High School Annex into an Independent National High School	Laak	Compostela Valley
2013-04-16	10507	Changing the Name of a National High School	Linapacan	Palawan
2013-04-16	10508	Changing the Name of an Elementary School	Batangas City	Batangas
2013-04-16	10509	Converting a High School Annex into an Independent National High School	Daanbantayan	Cebu
2013-04-16	10510	Converting a High School Annex into an Independent National High School	Itogon	Benguet
2013-04-16	10511	Converting a High School Annex into an Independent National High School	Baguio	Benguet
2013-04-16	10512	Converting a High School Annex into an Independent National High School	Baguio	Benguet
2013-04-16	10513	Converting a High School Annex into an Independent National High School	Baguio	Benguet
2013-04-16	10514	Establishing a City Schools Division Office	Antipolo	Rizal
2013-04-17	10515	Anti-Cable Television and Cable Internet Tapping Act of 2013		
2013-04-17	10516	Expanding Utilization of an Industrial Estate	Limay	Bataan
2013-04-23	10517	Creating additional Branches of the Regional Trial Court	San Pedro	Laguna
2013-04-23	10518	Creating additional Branches of the Regional Trial Court	Lucena	Quezon
2013-04-23	10519	Creating additional Branches of the Regional Trial Court	Toledo	Cebu
2013-04-23	10520	Creating additional Branches of the Metropolitan Trial Court and the Regional Trial Court	Malabon	NCR
2013-04-23	10521	Creating additional Branches of the Regional Trial Court	Malolos	Bulacan
2013-04-23	10522	Creating additional Branches of the Metropolitan Trial Court	Las Piñas	NCR
2013-04-23	10523	Creating an additional Branch of the Regional Trial Court	Siniloan	Laguna
2013-04-23	10524	Amending the Magna Carta for PWD or RA 7277		
2013-04-23	10525	Declaring the First Week of February of Each Year as “World Interfaith Harmony Week”		
2013-04-23	10526	Declaring the Month of January of Each Year as “Liver Cancer and Viral Hepatitis Awareness and Prevention Month”		
2013-05-07	10527	Converting an Elementary School into an Integrated School	Laoag	Ilocos Norte
2013-05-07	10528	Converting an Extension Office into a Regular Office of the LTO	San Simon	Pampanga
2013-05-07	10529	Renaming a Regional Office of the PNP	Davao City	Davao del Sur
2013-05-07	10530	The Red Cross and Other Emblems Act of 2013		
2013-05-07	10531	Amending the National Electrification Administration Decree or PD 269		
2013-05-07	10532	Philippine National Health Research System Act of 2013		
2013-05-15	10533	Enhanced Basic Education Act of 2013		
2013-05-15	10534	Renaming a Provincial Office of the PNP	Bontoc	Mountain Province
2013-05-15	10535	Philippine Standard Time Act of 2013		
2013-05-15	10536	Amending the Meat Inspection Code or RA 9296		
2013-05-15	10537	Creating additional Branches of the Metropolitan Trial Court	Makati	NCR
2013-05-15	10538	Creating an additional Branch of the Regional Trial Court	Cauayan	Isabela
2013-05-15	10539	Creating additional Branches of the Regional Trial Court	Gumaca	Quezon
2013-05-15	10540	Creating additional Branches of the Regional Trial Court	Barili	Cebu
2013-05-15	10541	Creating an additional Branch of the Regional Trial Court	Ormoc	Leyte
2013-05-15	10542	Creating an additional Branch of the Regional Trial Court	Midsayap	North Cotabato
2013-05-15	10543	Creating an additional Branch of the Regional Trial Court	Santa Cruz	Laguna
2013-05-15	10544	Creating additional Branches of the Regional Trial Court	Argao	Cebu
2013-05-15	10545	Creating additional Branches of the Regional Trial Court	Danao	Cebu
2013-05-15	10546	Creating an additional Branch of the Regional Trial Court	Cotabato City	Maguindanao
2013-05-15	10547	Creating additional Branches of the Regional Trial Court	Puerto Princesa	Palawan
2013-05-15	10548	Converting a Road into National Road	Iloilo City	Iloilo
2013-05-15	10549	Converting a Provincial Road to National Road	Bacoor	Cavite
2013-05-15	10550	Converting a Provincial Road to National Road		Zamboanga del Sur
2013-05-15	10551	Converting a Provincial Road to National Road		Ifugao
2013-05-15	10552	Converting a Road into National Road		Camarines Norte
2013-05-15	10553	Converting a Road into National Road	Valenzuela City	NCR
2013-05-15	10554	Establishing a City Schools Division Office	Tagbilaran	Bohol
2013-05-15	10555	Declaring Places in the Municipality as Cultural Heritage Tourism Zone	Iloilo City	Iloilo
2013-05-15	10556	Declaring Every November 27 a Regular Working Holiday as the “Araw ng Pagbasa”		
2013-05-15	10557	Renaming the Product Development and Design Center of the Philippines into the Design Center of the Philippines	Pasay	NCR
2013-05-15	10558	Increasing Plantilla Positions for the West Visayas State University and West Visayas State University Medical Center	Iloilo City	Iloilo
2013-05-17	10559	Renaming a Provincial Office of the PNP	Puerto Princesa	Palawan
2013-05-17	10560	Declaring a Tourism Development Area		Davao Oriental
2013-05-17	10561	Declaring a Tourism Development Area		Kalinga
2013-05-22	10562	Creating additional Branches of the Regional Trial Court	Paniqui	Tarlac
2013-05-22	10563	Creating an additional Branch of the Regional Trial Court	Capas	Tarlac
2013-05-22	10564	Creating additional Branches of the Regional Trial Court	Tarlac City	Tarlac
2013-05-22	10565	Creating an additional Branch of the Regional Trial Court	Digos	Davao del Sur
2013-05-22	10566	Creating additional Branches of the Metropolitan Trial Court	Pasig	NCR
2013-05-22	10567	Creating an additional Branch of the Regional Trial Court	Urdaneta	Pangasinan
2013-05-22	10568	Creating an additional Branches of the Regional Trial Court and the Municipal Trial Court	Antipolo	Rizal
2013-05-22	10569	Creating additional Branches of the Regional Trial Court	Biñan	Laguna
2013-05-22	10570	Creating additional Branches of the Regional Trial Court and the Municipal Trial Court	Cebu City	Cebu
2013-05-22	10571	Creating an additional Branch of the Regional Trial Court	Bais	Negros Oriental
2013-05-24	10572	Amending the Family Code of the Philippines or EO 209 : Establishing a Liability of the Absolute Community or Conjugal Partnership		
2013-05-24	10573	Declaring a National Historical Landmark	Simunul	Tawi-Tawi
2013-05-24	10574	Amending the Rural Bank Act of 1992 or RA 7353 : Allowing Infusion of Foreign Equity		
2013-05-24	10575	Bureau of Corrections Act of 2013		
2013-05-24	10576	Creating an additional Branch of the Regional Trial Court	Kidapawan	North Cotabato
2013-05-24	10577	Creating additional Branches of the Regional Trial Court	Ipil	Zamboanga Sibugay
2013-05-24	10578	Creating additional Branches of the Regional Trial Court and the Municipal Trial Court	Lapu-Lapu City	Cebu
2013-05-24	10579	Creating an additional Branch of the Regional Trial Court	Talibon	Bohol
2013-05-24	10580	Creating additional Branches of the Regional Trial Court	Morong	Rizal
2013-05-24	10581	Creating additional Branches of the Regional Trial Court	Olongapo	Zambales
2013-05-24	10582	Creating additional Branches of the Regional Trial Court	Angeles City	Pampanga
2013-05-24	10583	Converting a State College into a State University	Bontoc	Mountain Province
2013-05-24	10584	Converting a State College into a State University	Tabuk	Kalinga
2013-05-24	10585	Converting a State College into a State University	Cotabato City	Maguindanao
2013-05-27	10586	Anti-Drunk and Drugged Driving Act of 2013		
2013-05-27	10587	Environmental Planning Act of 2013 : Repealing PD 1308		
2013-05-27	10588	Palarong Pambansa Act of 2013		
2013-05-24	10589	Declaring Every December of Every Year as “Anti-Corruption Month”		
2013-05-27	10590	Overseas Voting Act of 2013 : Amending RA 9189		
2013-05-29	10591	Comprehensive Firearms and Ammunition Regulation Act		
2013-05-29	10592	Amending the Revised Penal Code or Act 3815		
2013-05-29	10593	Amending the Coconut Preservation Act of 1995 or RA 8048		
2013-06-04	10594	Establishing a State College : Talisay City State College	Talisay	Cebu
2013-06-04	10595	Converting a State College into a State University : Iloilo Science and Technology University		Iloilo
2013-06-04	10596	Converting a State College into a State University : Mindoro State University (MINSU)		Oriental Mindoro
2013-06-04	10597	Integrating State Colleges into a State University : Northern Iloilo State University		Iloilo
2013-06-04	10598	Establishing a State College : Compostela Valley State College		Compostela Valley
2013-06-04	10599	Integrating State Colleges into a State University : Palompon Polytechnic State University		Leyte
2013-06-04	10600	Integrating State Colleges into a State University : Surigao del Norte State University		Surigao del Norte
2013-06-05	10601	Agricultural and Fisheries Mechanization Law		
2013-06-11	10602	Creating additional Branches of the Regional Trial Court	Malaybalay	Bukidnon
2013-06-11	10603	Creating additional Branches of the Regional Trial Court	San Mateo	Rizal
2013-06-11	10604	Converting a State College into a State University	Barotac Nuevo	Iloilo
2013-06-11	10605	Converting a State College into a State University	Magalang	Pampanga
2013-06-19	10606	Amending the National Health Insurance Act of 1995 or RA 7875 : National Health Insurance Act of 2013		
2013-08-15	10607	Amending the Insurance Code or PD 612		
2013-08-22	10608	Creating additional Branches of the Regional Trial Court	Polomolok	South Cotabato
2013-08-23	10609	Protection of Students' Right to Enroll in Review Centers Act of 2013		
2013-08-23	10610	Construction of a Fish Port	San Vicente	Northern Samar
2013-08-23	10611	Food Safety Act of 2013		
2013-08-23	10612	Fast-Tracked S&T Scholarship Act of 2013		
2013-08-28	10613	Increasing Bed Capacity of a Hospital	Zamboanga City	Zamboanga del Norte
2013-08-28	10614	Increasing Bed Capacity of a Hospital	Dagupan	Pangasinan
2013-08-28	10615	Construction of a Fish Port	San Remigio	Cebu
2013-08-28	10616	Construction of a Fish Port	Dagupan	Pangasinan
2013-08-28	10617	Construction of a Fish Port and Cold Storage Facility	Dapa	Surigao del Norte
2013-09-03	10618	Rural Farm Schools Act		
2013-09-03	10619	Establishing a Municipal Hospital	Tanudan	Kalinga
2013-09-03	10620	Toy and Game Safety Labeling Act of 2013		
2013-09-06	10621	Construction of a Fish Port and Cold Storage Facility	Sasmuan	Pampanga
2013-09-06	10622	Changing the Name of an Agricultural School	Lazi	Siquijor
2013-09-06	10623	Amending the Price Act or RA 7581		
2013-09-06	10624	Construction of a Fish Port	Calabanga	Camarines Sur
2013-09-12	10625	Philippine Statistical Act of 2013 : Repealing EO 121		
2013-09-12	10626	Converting a Sub-District Engineering Office into a Regular Office	Cotabato City	Cotabato
2013-09-12	10627	Anti-Bullying Act of 2013		
2013-09-26	10628	Construction of Fish Ports		Sulu
2013-09-26	10629	Amending the National Integrated Protected Areas System Act of 1992 or RA 7586		
2013-10-03	10630	Amending the Juvenile Justice and Welfare Act 2006 or RA 9344		
2013-10-03	10631	Amending the Animal Welfare Act of 1998 or RA 8485		
2013-10-03	10632	Amending RA 9340 : Postponement of Sangguniang Kabataan Elections		
2013-12-16	10633	Appropriations Act of 2014		
2013-12-26	10634	Supplemental Appropriations Act for 2013		
