= West Visayas State University, Janiuay =

Public university in Iloilo, Philippines

West Visayas State University
- Motto: "Service, Harmony, Excellence"
- Type: State University
- Established: 1902 (system); 1946 (campus)
- President: Dr. Joselito F. Villaruz, M.D.
- Administrator: Dr. Guiller P. Pendon
- Students: 1575 (second semester, 2017-2018)
- Location: Janiuay, Iloilo, Philippines; 10°56′47″N 122°30′13″E
- Campus: Suburban
- Colors: Blue & gold
- Nickname: Taga-West
- Sporting affiliations: SCUAA

- Location in the Visayas Location in the Philippines

West Visayas State University, Janiuay is a satellite campus of West Visayas State University, located in Janiuay, Iloilo, Philippines. It is one of the four WVSU satellite campuses in the Third Congressional District of Iloilo.

== History ==
The institution was founded as Janiuay High School (JHS) on July 5, 1946, through the efforts of Hon. Tiburcio A. Lutero, the then congressman of the Third Congressional District of Iloilo. Located on a land area of 7.92 hectares (19.6 acres), it was the first public high school in the municipality and strategically situated in the town center of Janiuay. The conversion of Janiuay High School into Janiuay National Vocational High School (JNVHS) on June 21, 1959, under Republic Act No. 2411 authored by then congressman Domitilo G. Abordo made the school focus more on Vocational education.

On June 19, 1971, the school became Janiuay National Comprehensive High School (JNCHS) through Republic Act No. 6313 authored by a congresswoman from the Third District of Iloilo, Hon. Gloria Tabiana and a two-year technical college was opened.

Under Republic Act No. 6667 dated June 22, 1988 authored by then congressman, Hon. Licurgo P. Tirador, renamed the school to Don Tiburcio A. Lutero National Comprehensive HIGH School (DTALNCHS), in honor of its founder, congressman Tiburcio Alianza Lutero.

On March 30, 1995, the school was converted to Janiuay Polytechnic College (JPC), by virtue of Republic Act No. 7974, again authored by Hon. Licurgo P. Tirador. During the span of fifty years the name of the school, the curricular offerings and the school heads had changed.

After five years as a Polytechnic College, it was integrated to West Visayas State University on August 22, 2000, in consonance with CHED Memorandum Order No. 27, series of 2000 which contained the implementing of guidelines on integration of CHED Supervised Institutions (CSIs) to State Universities and Colleges (SUCs), by virtue of Republic Act No. 7722, otherwise known as the “Higher Education Act of 1994” and Republic Act No. 8292, otherwise known as the “Higher Education Modernization Act of 1997”.

From then and onwards, Janiuay Polytechnic College has become known as West Visayas State University - Janiuay Campus (WVSU-JC). Dr. Raymund Banquillo Gemora, professor VI, serves as the current campus administrator.
