= Sindangan National High School =

Public high school in Zamboanga del Norte, Philippines

Coordinates: 8°14′27″N 123°00′10″E

- Location: Sindangan,Zamboanga del Norte
- Established: 1966
- School Head: Lucela E. Balbuena (2025-Present)
- School ID: 303739

The Sindangan National High School is a high school institution and a secondary public school located in Sindangan, Zamboanga del Norte in the Philippines.

It offers high school studies from first year to fourth year levels. It has a pioneering ESEP class which has currently three year levels with two sections in each year. It will offer all four year levels next school year.

Among the notable alumni are Sherwin Baguion, grand finalist of Pilipinas Got Talent, and Golda Meir Sapalo, 4th runner-up for Miss Zanorte 2008.

== Leadership ==
Agnes Dumajel Malinao is the current school OIC in the office of the Principal. Since 1966, Victoria Ratificar was the school principal, the nickname of the students "sailors", was inspired by her name "victoria" which coincidentally name of Ferdinand Magellan's voyage. Ratificar retired in 2009. Marilyn D. Parreño replaced her and became the OIC until 2011 where she was assigned in Ponot National High School and the current principal, Edgar Padao, replaced her. Edgar Padao is retiring on his birthday in the first half of 2012. Agnes D. Malinao was assigned to head the school after Padao retires. A new school principal will soon be in office. Now in the present after Anicita B. Aban the last school retired in 2025, Lucela E. Balbuena replaced her.

The Supreme Secondary Learner Government of Sindangan National High School also known as Supreme Sailors Council, also have a new set of officers after the former SSLG president for S.Y. 2024-2025, Zephaniah Pameron graduated, James Brian Calunod was elected as the new school SSLG President for S.Y. 2025-2026.

== Publication ==
Ang Umaga and The Junior Pen is the school's official school publication for Filipino and English respectively.

== Library quiz ==
The Sindangan National High School Library Quiz is held annually at the Sindangan National High School Library.
