= Sindangan =

Municipality in Zamboanga del Norte, Philippines

- Municipality
- Municipality of Sindangan
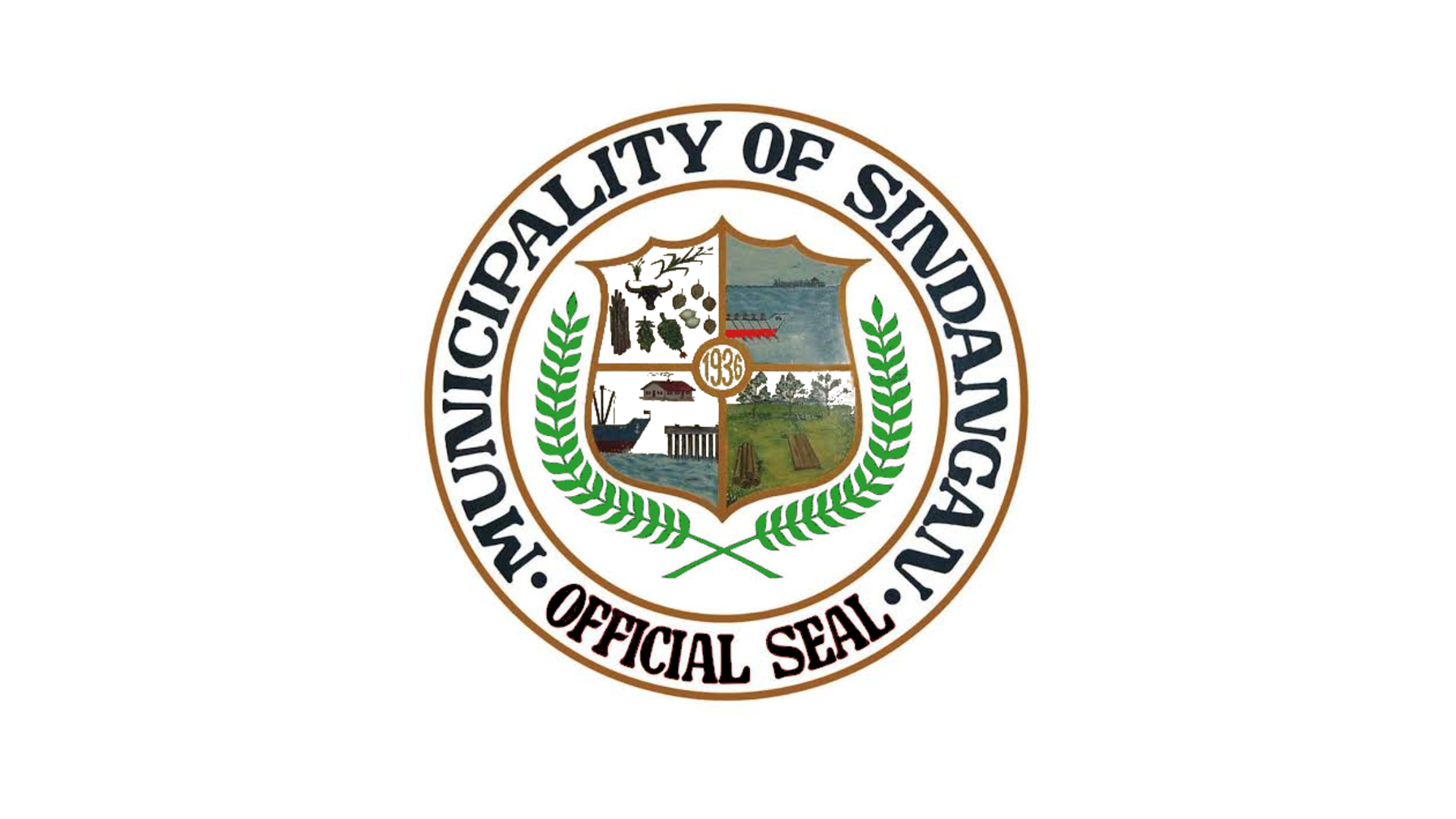
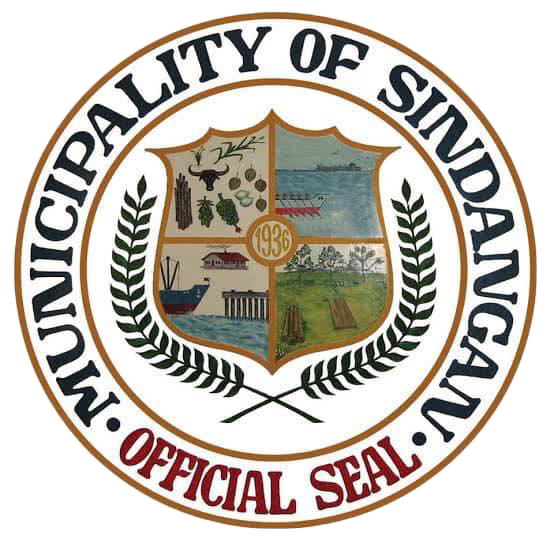
- Flag Seal
- Nicknames: Fish Capital of Zamboanga del Norte; Zanorte’s Premier Municipality
- Motto: Shine Sindangan!
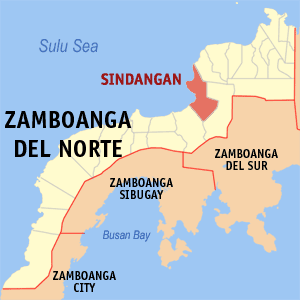
- Map of Zamboanga del Norte with Sindangan highlighted
- Interactive map of Sindangan
- Location within the Philippines
- Coordinates: 8°14′19″N 122°59′55″E
- Country: Philippines
- Region: Zamboanga Peninsula
- Province: Zamboanga del Norte
- District: 2nd district
- Founded: December 23, 1936
- Barangays: 52 (see Barangays)

Government
  - Type: Sangguniang Bayan
  - Mayor: Glona G. Labadlabad (Lakas)
  - Vice Mayor: Nilo Florentino Z. Sy (Lakas)
  - Representative: Irene G. Labadlabad (Lakas)
  - Municipal Council: Members: Rainier V. Maningo; Clint V. Macias; Gervalieto S. Abapo; Bethlehem B. Gurrea; Victoria S. Labadlabad; Michael A. Masalta; Virginia G. Ong; Jerome E. Ochavo
  - Electorate: 72,505 voters (2025)

Area
  - Total: 451.00 km^{2} (174.13 sq mi)
- Elevation: 39 m (128 ft)
- Highest elevation: 304 m (997 ft)
- Lowest elevation: 0 m (0 ft)

Population (2024 census)
  - Total: 104,514
  - Rank: 1st out of 25 municipalities in Zamboanga del Norte; 1st out of 67 municipalities in Zamboanga Peninsula
  - Density: 231.74/km^{2} (600.20/sq mi)
  - Households: 24,895
- Demonym: Sindanganon

Economy
  - Income class: 1st municipal income class, 1st municipal income class
  - Poverty incidence: 42.34% (2023)
  - Revenue: ₱ 503 million (2024)
  - Assets: ₱ 1,483 million (2024)
  - Expenditure: ₱ 194.4 million (2024)
  - Liabilities: ₱ 246.7 million (2024)

Service provider
  - Electricity: Zamboanga del Norte Electric Cooperative (ZANECO)
  - Water: Sindangan Water District (SINWADI)
- Time zone: UTC+8 (PST)
- ZIP code: 7112
- PSGC: 0907218000
- IDD : area code: +63 (0)65
- Native languages: Subanon; Cebuano; Tagalog
- Catholic diocese: Diocese of Dipolog
- Patron saint: Saint Joseph the Worker (primary); Our Lady of Fatima (secondary)
- Website: sindangan.gov.ph

Sindangan, officially the Municipality of Sindangan (Cebuano: Lungsod sa Sindangan; Subanen: Benwa Sindangan; Chavacano: Municipalidad de Sindangan; Tagalog: Bayan ng Sindangan), is a municipality in the province of Zamboanga del Norte, Philippines. According to the 2024 census, it has a population of 104,514 people.

Sindangan is the fastest-growing municipality in Zamboanga del Norte. With its infrastructure and commerce showing massive improvements since the start of the current decade, it is now projected to become the third city in the province, following Dapitan and the provincial capital, Dipolog.

== Etymology ==
As to how Sindangan got its name, several stories have been told.

The first version narrates that a native fisherman carrying a basket full of fish was on his way home met a Guardia Civil, military guards during the Spanish regime, who asked this question, "Cuál es el nombre de este lugar, amigo?" (English: What is the name of this place, friend?) And the Subanon fisherman who did not understand the Spanish language answered "Indangan", believing he asked on the kind of fish he caught. The stranger heard this as "Sindangan", thinking that was the exact answer to his inquiry to the fisherman about the name of the fish. From then on, the natives used Sindangan to name the place until it became into a municipality in 1936.

The town appeared in the 1734 Murillo Velarde map which was originally spelled as Sindãgan.

== History ==
This town sets back its origin during the pre-Spanish colonization of the Philippines. Subanon people or tribe was its first inhabitants. The Subanens, a nomadic tribe of Indo-Malayan stock, were the earliest known settlers who lived along river banks or "suba", from which word they received their present tribal identity as Subanen. They built houses and sanctuaries for their shelter and formed their own 'government' ruled by the Datu.

Over the years the Moros settled also in this place and preached Islam.

=== Spanish Era (as a Municipal District) ===
In the 1850s during the Spanish reign in the archipelago, a number of towns had already been established in Luzon and in the Visayas while majority of the territories in Mindanao were still unclaimed by the Spaniards despite having already ruled the islands for over 200 years. Sindangan was one of the unclaimed territories in Mindanao until the late 19th century where it was designated as a rancheria under the district of Misamis. When Misamis was incorporated into a province during the American occupation in the 1900s, Sindangan became a military detachment station for the American troops at the height of the Philippine-American War as the assault of the Tulisanes (bandits) in Mindanao at the time were rampant in fight for Philippine independence.

The war ended with the Americans taking over the Philippines and Sindangan became a barrio under the jurisdiction of the pueblo of Dapitan. It was also in this era where people from the Visayas islands flocked to Mindanao to find greener pasture. Christianity then slowly propagated on this area through the effort of the Catholic missionaries like the Society of Jesus or the Jesuits, the Augustinians, and the Dominicans. One of its great missionaries was Padre Francesco Palliola, a Jesuit missionary from Nola, Italy who tirelessly preached the Christian message, perform baptisms and sacraments and helped the tribal people in this area of Zamboanga Peninsula. He was assigned in Dapitan and Katipunan, and met his martyrdom in the barrio of Ponot (now Jose Dalman) where he was killed by the Subanen people through the leadership of their chieftain.

In 1914, pueblos in the Philippines with Christianized settlers were converted into municipalities while barrios with populations that are not fully Christianized but having a significant number of settlers were converted into municipal districts. In Spanish Philippines, a barrio is not eligible to be converted into a pueblo unless a Catholic parish is built and locals are fully Christianized and are permanently settled under the reduccion system. When the Americans took over the government in the 1900s, they reformed the Spanish pueblo system and renamed pueblos into municipalities with greater inclusiveness among Filipinos. Upon the conversion of the barrio of Lubungan (now Katipunan) into a municipality, the newly elevated municipal district of Sindangan was transferred under its jurisdiction out from its mother town, Dapitan.

It was also in this same year that the province of Zamboanga was incorporated and the said towns were later transferred to the newly created province out from their mother province of Misamis. However, despite the elevation of Sindangan’s status as a municipal district, it remained unconnected by road to other towns and barrios, making only sea travel as the primary mode of transportation to reach the seat of government in Lubungan.

=== Commonwealth Era (as a separate Municipality) ===
In the 1930s, the population of the municipal district of Sindangan multiplied and Christianity became a dominant religion. The parish priest from Lubungan would come to Sindangan once a year by boat to conduct mass wedding ceremonies to locals and to celebrate Christianity. Propitiously, as its population significantly grew over the years, Sindangan was finally designated as a separate parish from Lubungan and in 1935, a parish church was built with the help of its parishioners. This feat vitalized the Sindanganon settlers to push for their separation from the municipality of Lubungan and be granted as a separate municipality.

The next year, on December 23, 1936, Sindangan was finally separated from the municipality of Lubungan (Katipunan) and became an independent municipality by virtue of Executive Order No. 77 issued by President of the Commonwealth of the Philippines, Manuel L. Quezon. The municipalities of Sindangan, Siocon, Margosatubig, Pagadian, and Kabasalan were created out of the municipal districts of Sindangan, Panganuran, Labangan, Dinas, Sibuko, Sirawai, Margosatubig, Malangas, Kabasalan and Bangaan. The Municipality of Sindangan covered the area of Sindangan and Panganuran.

Bartolome Lira Sr. was appointed to organize the Municipality of Sindangan and was its first Municipal President. As his appointive tenure expired, he was elected as the first Municipal Mayor of Sindangan until 1941.

In 1955, four barrios of were created:

- Dicoyong - sitios of Labakid, Layawan, Morob, Gusani, Domalogdog, Maoal, Nato, Diongan, Makasing, Dipolo and Dicoyong Proper;
- Bacungan - sitios of Palandok, Rison, Bogabongan, Manil, Gusao, Talinga and Bacungan Proper;
- Lagag - sitios of Milaub, Mangalop, Gopit, Pase, Lipaga, Mianib, Siayan, Litolit, Balok, and Lagag Proper; and Bitoon - sitios of Misok, Hagonoy, Lico, Guban, Makinong, and Bitoon Proper
- Binuangan - sitios of Taguicon, Upper Binuangan, and Gusapong Proper

In 1959, the sitios of Gonayen, Gowayan, Domogok, Dinoyak, Mangilay, Pange, Balak, Laclac, Siriac, Macasing and Diongan were constituted into the barrio of Gonayen.

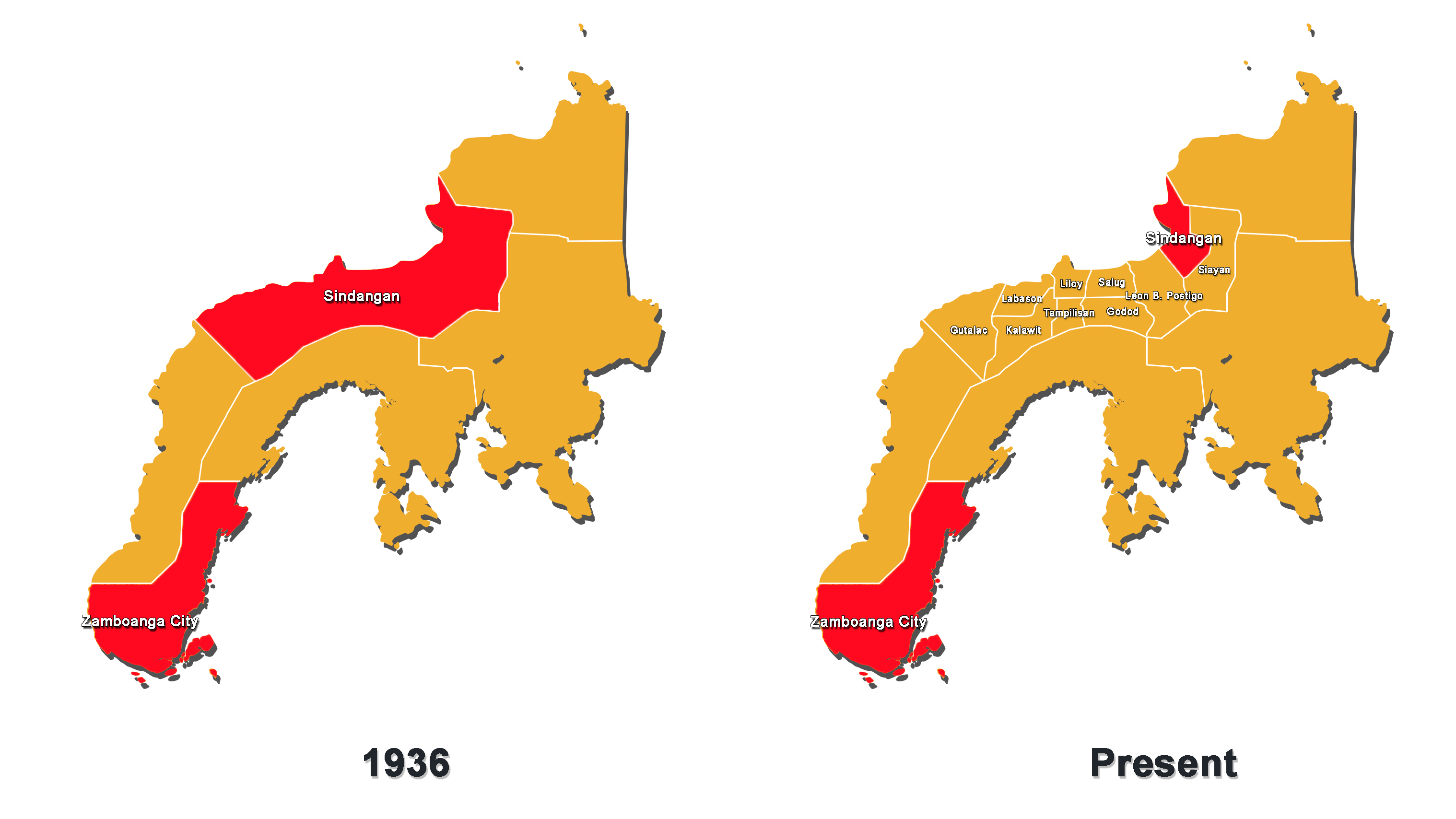
Sindangan's political territory in 1936 (left) and in the present (right) in comparison with Zamboanga City

At the time of its creation as an independent municipality, Sindangan had the biggest territory in terms of land area in the then Province of Zamboanga (now the administrative region Zamboanga Peninsula with three separate provinces). It once comprised the current municipalities of Sindangan, Siayan, Leon B. Postigo, Salug, Godod, Liloy, Tampilisan, Labason, Gutalac, and Kalawit. With these measurements as evidenced, Sindangan was deemed to be bigger than the present land area of Zamboanga City before its division.

It was during the Third Philippine Republic when Sindangan subsequently lost huge portions of its territories after the creation of its offspring municipalities, namely: Labason (1947), Liloy (1951), Siayan (1967), and Leon B. Postigo (established as Bacungan, 1982). These aforementioned new municipalities also went reductions of their territories later in the years in light of the creation of newer municipalities, making Sindangan their mother and grandmother town.

Since its elevation to a municipality in 1936, people from Luzon and the Visayas continued migrating to Sindangan to settle together with their families and built businesses. That is why aside from the Subanens, there are Sindanganons whose origins are from Bohol, Cebu, Samar, Leyte, Negros, Bicol, Pampanga, and Manila.

=== World War II ===
During the Second World War, Sindangan was fortunately spared from the air bombings and battles happening in Luzon and in some parts of Mindanao at the time. Nonetheless, guerrilla forces were present in the isolated areas of the municipality at the height of World War II and it was in the municipal waters of Sindangan when the SS Shinyō Maru sank with hundreds of prisoners of war on board the ship.

With approximately 750 Filipino and American prisoners of war (POW) on board, the vessel departed from its POW camp in Davao for Manila with stopover point in Zamboanga City. She departed Zamboanga the next day via Cebu in a convoy of large freighters, tankers, and torpedo boats to protect her against American destroyers. Meanwhile, an allied intelligence intercepted the Japanese Navy radio signals about Shinyō Maru’s movements which prompted the US Navy to send the submarine USS Paddle in a mission to intercept the convoy and sink her. With its movement now determined, the US submarine had waited for hours for the hell ship to pass by, two miles off coast from Sindangan point.

Upon reaching the waters of Sindangan Bay, Shinyō Maru was seen to be leading the convoy. Paddle got into position and fired a spread of four torpedoes at her, two of which hit her in her holds. Paddle then torpedoed a second ship of the convoy, whose commander beached her to prevent her from sinking. The Japanese escorts then started unsuccessfully depth charging Paddle, but she dived deep and escaped serious damage.

The torpedoes that hit Shin'yō Maru killed or wounded many of the POWs, and some of her Japanese crew and guards. As she sank, the guards machine-gunned the POWs to try to prevent them from abandoning ship. The surviving ships of the convoy launched boats to rescue Shin'yō Maru's crew and guards. A machine-gun mounted on the grounded ship also fired on the prisoners. Of 750 PoWs aboard the hell ship, 668 were killed. 83 got ashore alive, but one died the next day. 47 of her 52 Japanese crew and army guards were also killed.

The escaped POWs went inland, where they met a Filipino guerilla group commanded by a US Colonel McGee. The guerillas radioed US forces, who sent the submarine USS Narwhal to rescue them. On 29 October 1944 Narwhal came into Sindangan Bay, where she embarked 81 of the 82 survivors. One survivor, Joseph Coe, chose to remain to serve with the guerillas.

On September 7, 2014, on the 70th anniversary of the incident, the municipality of Sindangan dedicated a memorial remembering the victims and survivors of the Shinyo Maru, as well as the townsfolk who extended their hospitality and help.

Modern and Contemporary Era

In the 1960s, Sindangan has already surpassed the population of its mother town Dapitan and Katipunan and it was in these years that Sindangan gained political prominence in the province. Despite the consequent reduction of its territory over the past decades and afterwards due to the conversion of its selected barrios into separate municipalities, Sindangan’s population has not been reduced lower than its current population unlike its other neighboring municipalities who went the same process of territorial reduction in light of creating newer municipalities. These findings would later cement Sindangan as the most rapidly growing municipality in the province and would later be regarded as the most populous municipality in Zamboanga del Norte.

== Geography ==
Sindangan lies on the northwest corridor of Zamboanga del Norte. Its diverse geography ranges from Sulu Sea on the west and southwest, the Municipality of Leon Postigo on the south, the Municipality of Siayan on the east, the Municipality of Bayog, Zamboanga del Sur on the southeast, and the Municipality of Jose Dalman on the north. Ranging from plain, slightly rolling, hilly to mountainous terrains, the Municipality of Sindangan embraces 45,100 hectares of land. Of its 52 barangays, 22 are situated along the seacoast, bountifully blessed with marine resources which gained Sindangan the title “the fishing capital of Zamboanga del Norte.”

It is approximately 86 kilometers away from Dipolog and 234 kilometers away from Zamboanga City. Hence, the municipality is identified as the trading hub of the province considering, this is a major terminal point for links to Dipolog down to Ipil and further down south to Zamboanga City.

=== Climate ===
Climate data for Sindangan, Zamboanga del Norte
Month	Jan	Feb	Mar	Apr	May	Jun	Jul	Aug	Sep	Oct	Nov	Dec	Year
Mean daily maximum °C (°F)	29 (84)	29 (84)	30 (86)	31 (88)	30 (86)	29 (84)	29 (84)	29 (84)	30 (86)	29 (84)	29 (84)	29 (84)	29 (85)
Mean daily minimum °C (°F)	23 (73)	23 (73)	23 (73)	23 (73)	24 (75)	24 (75)	24 (75)	24 (75)	24 (75)	24 (75)	24 (75)	23 (73)	24 (74)
Average precipitation mm (inches)	104 (4.1)	76 (3.0)	92 (3.6)	97 (3.8)	199 (7.8)	238 (9.4)	195 (7.7)	193 (7.6)	178 (7.0)	212 (8.3)	171 (6.7)	110 (4.3)	1,865 (73.3)
Average rainy days	14.7	12.5	15.8	17.5	27.6	28.5	29.0	27.5	26.9	27.9	23.5	18.2	269.6
Source: Meteoblue

=== Barangays ===
Sindangan is politically subdivided into 52 barangays. Each barangay consists of puroks while some have sitios.

It has the most number of barangays among the 27 local government units in Zamboanga del Norte.

- Bago
- Balok
- Bantayan
- Bato
- Benigno Aquino Jr.
- Binuangan
- Bitoon
- Bucana
- Calatunan
- Caluan
- Calubian
- Dagohoy
- Dapaon
- Datagan
- Datu Tangkilan
- Dicoyong
- Disud
- Don Ricardo G Macias (Dinokot)
- Doña Josefa
- Dumalogdog
- Fatima
- Gampis
- Goleo
- Imelda
- Inuman
- Joaquin Macias
- La Concepcion
- La Roche San Miguel
- Labakid
- Lagag
- Lapero
- Lawis
- Mandih
- Maras
- Mawal
- Misok
- Motibot
- Nato
- Nipaan
- Pangalalan
- Piao
- Poblacion
- Pres. Ramon Magsaysay
- Santo Niño
- Santo Rosario
- Siari
- Talinga
- Tigbao
- Tinaplan
- Titik
- Upper Inuman
- Upper Nipaan

Barangay Mandih, Poblacion, and Siari are the most densely populated areas of Sindangan as of the latest count.

== Demographics ==
Population census of Sindangan

Year	Pop.	±% p.a.
1903	43	—
1918	10,095	+43.89%
1939	27,324	+4.86%
1948	30,484	+1.22%
1960	37,105	+1.65%
1970	43,349	+1.57%
1975	53,649	+4.37%
1980	66,177	+4.29%

Year	Pop.	±% p.a.
1990	66,692	+0.08%
1995	72,098	+1.47%
2000	80,133	+2.29%
2007	87,720	+1.26%
2010	94,146	+2.61%
2015	99,435	+1.05%
2020	103,952	+0.94%
2024	104,514	+0.13%

Source: Philippine Statistics Authority

=== Population ===
Sindangan is the first (and currently the only) municipality in Zamboanga Peninsula to reach the 100,000 population mark. As of the 2020 census, the town has a population of 103,952 people, making it the second largest local government unit in the province of Zamboanga del Norte after the provincial capital city of Dipolog. Despite being a municipality, it is 20,000 people ahead of the population of the city of Dapitan and is either twice or three times more of the population of every municipality in the province compared, making Sindangan the most populous municipality in Zamboanga del Norte. It is also the most populous municipality in Region IX.

Sindangan is populated by the tri-people – the Subanens, Muslims, and the Christian migrants coming from Luzon and Visayan islands.

Community-Based Monitoring System puts the number of Subanens as 24,640 or 27.5 percent of the total population with the greater number of them living in the interior barangays. The Muslims – Maranao and Tausug merchants live and ply their trades in Poblacion and its adjoining barangays.

As of 2023, Sindangan has a stronghold of 72,613 registered voters.

=== Religion ===
Roman Catholicism strongly dominates Sindangan as shown by their religious festivities and fiestas. Famous to these Catholic Devotion is the Diocesan Shrine of the Divine Mercy in Barangay Siari where thousands of pilgrims flocked from all over the region to pray and visit to the shrine. Other Christian denominations are also present in Sindangan as well as Islam.

== Economy ==
Poverty incidence of Sindangan (%)

Source: Philippine Statistics Authority

Sindangan’s economy is mainly focused on agriculture and fishing. It has a plain and elevated geography that is ideal for planting crops. Among its primary agricultural products are rice, corn, banana, and vegetable crops that is typically grown on its outlying barangays and are brought by batches in the town center every Sunday morning. Being a coastal town, Sindangan boasts its fresh sea products coming from the abundant waters of the Sindangan Bay. The municipality has been the main supplier of sea products in landlocked municipalities such as Siayan in Zamboanga del Norte, and the towns of Dumingag, Mahayag, Sominot, Midsalip, and Molave in Zamboanga del Sur, thus earning Sindangan the nickname as the “Fishing Capital”. More than that, the town is also famous of its varieties of fresh and dried fish products and its local restaurants known as “Sutukil”.

== Government ==
Mayors of the
Municipality of Sindangan
Bartolome Lira Sr., 1936-1941
Emilio Ortuoste, 1942-1945
Joaquin Macias, 1946-1953, 1958-1963
Abundio B. Siasico, Sr., 1954-1957
Filomena Macias, 1964-1967
Jose Tan, 1968-1971
Mariano S. Macias, 1972-1979
Ricardo S. Macias, 1980-1985
Crescente Y. Llorente Jr., 1986-1995, July–November 2004
Winnie O. Albos, 1995-2004
Bert S. Macias, November 2004-June 2010
Nilo Florentino Z. Sy, July 2010-June 2019
Rosendo S. Labadlabad, July 2019-June 2025
Glona G. Labadlabad, July 2025-present

Sindangan's local government structure is composed of one mayor, one vice mayor and eight councilors, named as Sangguniang Bayan members, all elected through popular vote. Two ex officio members are added to the Sangguniang Bayan with one representing Sindangan's 52 Barangay Captains being the Association of Barangay Councils (ABC) President, and one representing Sindangan's 52 Barangay Youth Council Presidents being the Sangunniang Kabataan (SK) Federation President. Each official, with the exemption of the ABC and SK Presidents, is elected publicly to a 3-year term and can be re-elected up to 3 terms in succession.

== Transportation ==
Tricycles, 'trisikads' and 'habal-habal' are the common public transport in the town center, both uptown and downtown. Racal Motorcycles are also emerging as public transportation in the town.

=== By Land ===
The Sindangan Integrated Bus Terminal in Barangay Goleo is served by numerous public land transports such as the RTMI Buses (Rural Transit) via National Highway. It provides daily transport from Dipolog, Ipil, to Zamboanga City. SUVs or 'van', Ceres Liners and jeepneys are also available for daily transport. Trips to Pagadian City has also been already operational via Sindangan-Siayan-Dumingag-Mahayag road.

=== By Sea ===
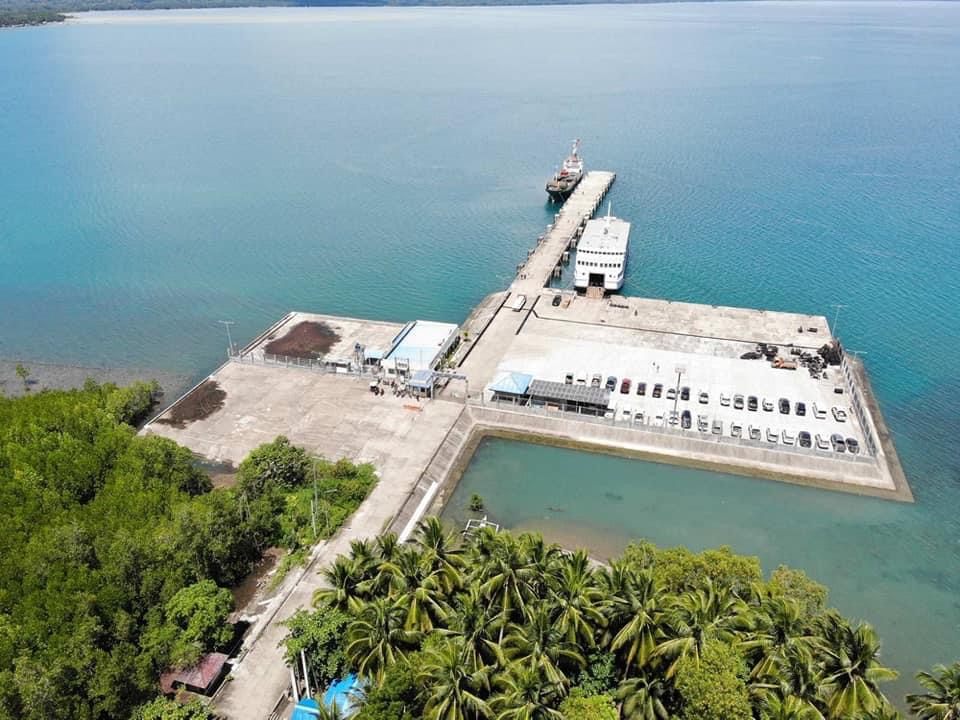
Aerial view of the port of Sindangan

The Port of Sindangan is a seaport located in Barangay Calatunan, facing the Sindangan Bay. It is currently managed under the Philippine Ports Authority (PPA) and is considered as the main gateway of the town's economy. Recently, since June 2022, the port is already operating regular RORO trips to and from the cities of Dumaguete and Cebu.

== Sports ==
Sindangan boasts several sports facilities capable of hosting major events, such as the provincial and regional athletic meets. The Sindangan Cultural and Sports Complex, one of the largest in Region 9, features an outdoor basketball and tennis court, an Olympic-size swimming pool with a diving board, a musical and dancing fountain, and the SinDome—a coliseum-type sports arena. The SinDome can host concerts, pageants, seminars, and similar gatherings.

A new facility, the Sindangan Sports University, is currently under construction in Barangay Siari. This development will include a track and field area and a dedicated sports building suitable for indoor activities like taekwondo, boxing, and table tennis.

In addition to these major complexes, every barangay in Sindangan has a covered court and a stage for local community events and gatherings.

== Tourism ==
These are only some of its places of interest and recreation.

=== Sindangan River Esplanade ===
The Sindangan People’s Boardwalk, also known as the Sindangan River Esplanade or locally as the Sindangan Boulevard, is a multi-phase construction project along the northern bank of the Sindangan River near its mouth. Phase 1, which currently runs from the national highway in Barangay Goleo to southern Barangay Lawis, is already complete and serves as a popular recreational area for both residents of Sindangan and tourists. Once fully finished, the boardwalk is expected to extend approximately 8 kilometers from the Piao Bridge in Barangay Goleo all the way to the Port of Sindangan in Barangay Calatunan, making it an ideal venue for large public events such as street festivals, marathons, and triathlons.

== Healthcare ==
Sindangan is being served by the Sindangan District Hospital, a community hospital located in Barangay Poblacion.

== Education ==
Educational institutions are widely distributed in Sindangan.

The town has two college institutions, both religious, the St. Joseph College of Sindangan Incorporated (SJCSI) and the Philippine Advent College (PAC). Both offer courses in education, liberal arts, and computer sciences. PAC consistently produces nurses passing the board.

The town has fifty-seven (57) elementary schools, ten (10) secondary schools. Five are situated in the outlying barangays and four (4) in the urban barangays.

A TESDA training center in Barangay Goleo offers technical courses and training to qualified students.

In 2021, an extension campus of the Mindanao State University is formally opened in Sindangan.

=== Universities ===
==== Mindanao State University Main Campus - Sindangan Extension ====
In 2020, an extension campus of MSU Main was approved by the board of directors and a campus was erected in uptown Misok. Formal opening of classes for their pioneering batch commenced in 2021. Currently, the MSU-MCSE offers ten courses.

- BS Statistics
- BS Mathematics
- BS Fisheries
- BS Psychology
- BS Environmental Science
- BS Agricultural and Biosystems Engineering
- BS Mechanical Engineering
- BS Civil Engineering
- BS Electrical Engineering
- BS Chemical Engineering

=== Colleges ===
Saint Joseph College of Sindangan, Inc. was founded on March 19, 1968, as Saint Joseph High School and eventually became the first college institution in Sindangan. The college was owned and supervised by The Roman Catholic Diocese of Dipolog until now together with its other institutions like Saint Vincent's College in Dipolog, and Saint Estanislaus Kostka College in Manukan, Zamboanga del Norte.

- List of the College Presidents in the Diocese
- 1.+Most. Rev. Felix Sanchez Zafra, D.D. -first bishop of the Diocese of Dipolog appointed by Pope Paul VI on July 31, 1967. He was transferred as Bishop of the Diocese of Tagbilaran by Pope John Paul II on October 20, 1986. By then, the seat of the bishop of the diocese was vacant for more or less 7 months.
- 2. Most. Rev. Jose Ricare Manguiran, D.D. - appointed by Pope John Paul II as second bishop of the Diocese of Dipolog on May 27, 1987, until his retirement on July 25, 2014.
- 3. Most. Rev. Severo Cagatan Caermare, D.D. -appointed by Pope Francis on July 25, 2014, as third bishop of the diocese.

Philippine Advent College, Sindangan, formerly known as Hillside View College, a Christian college founded in Sindangan on 1975. It is currently the only institution in town who offers a bachelor's program for nursing.

=== High schools ===
- Sindangan National High School
- Sindangan National Agricultural School
- Saint Joseph College of Sindangan, Incorporated, High School Department
- Philippine Advent College, High School Department
- Siare John H. Roemer Memorial National High School
- Bartolome Lira National High School
- Dumalogdog National High School
- Lapero National High School
- Dona Natividad L. Macias Integrated School, High School Department

== Culture ==
=== Saint Joseph the Worker Town Fiesta- May 1 (Labor's Day) ===
The town's primary patron saint is Saint Joseph the Worker, who is traditionally regarded as the foster father of Jesus and the husband of the Virgin Mary. The title "El Obrero," meaning "the Worker," refers to Joseph's traditional occupation as a carpenter. The patronage is associated with the local community's historical connection to agricultural and manual labor.

=== Sinulog Festival - Siari's Feast Day ===
The second parish in Sindangan in the Barangay of Siari honors their patron saint, Santo Nino de Cebu, every third Sunday of January where a grand fluvial procession at the eve of the fiesta is celebrated. On the day of the fiesta, a street dance procession is held and a Sinulog Dance Competition follows at the end of the procession.

=== Pasidungog Festival ===
It is one of Sindangan's grand festivals in honor of the town's patron saint itself — Saint Joseph the Worker. The parish dedicated to the said patron is the first and oldest in Sindangan, and is also the biggest of all the parishes in the Diocese of Dipolog. Saint Joseph College's founding anniversary happens on March 19 during the Solemnity of Saint Joseph, the Husband of Mary.

=== Linggo ng Sindangan ===
An annual celebration that commemorates the municipal charter day of Sindangan. The celebration usually starts on 17 December and ends on 22 December. During the course of the week-long event, competitions and shows are usually held such as trade fairs, amateur boxing, motocross, singing competitions, firework shows, and many more. Mainly, the celebration is highlighted by a beauty pageant competition. Dubbed as the biggest beauty pageant in the entire Zamboanga Peninsula region, the annual search for the Binibining Sindangan has caused headlines and draws hundreds of applicants from throughout the country with its prestigious production and generous grand and consolation prizes. The winner of the most recent competition, which took place in December 2023, took home a brand-new car along with a cash reward of ₱500,000 and a round trip ticked to the United States.

Binibining Sindangan Gallery of Winners
Year	Winner	Image	Prize
2019	Sheka Torres		₱150,000
2020	No pageant held due to the COVID-19 pandemic		
2021	No pageant held due to the COVID-19 pandemic		
2022	We’am Ahmed		₱500,000 + Toyota Corolla Altis
2023	Reina Kobayashi		₱500,000 + Toyota Corolla Altis + Round trip ticket to the United States
2024	Jeanne Nicci Orcena		₱500,000 + Toyota Corolla Altis + Round trip ticket to the United States
2025	Abigail Balili		₱500,000 + Brand New Car + Asian Tour Package with ₱50,000 allowance

== Media ==
=== Radio stations ===
- 102.5 Like Radio Sindangan: Owned and operated by Capitol Broadcasting Center.
- 95.3 Prime FM (DXST): Owned and operated by Prime Broadcasting Network.

== Notable people ==
- Junrey Balawing, former Filipino record holder for the world's shortest man alive
- General Alexander B. Yano, 38th Chief of Staff of the Armed Forces of the Philippines
- Dodoy Labadlabad, former district representative and incumbent Sindangan mayor
- Glona Labadlabad, incumbent Zamboanga del Norte 2nd district congresswoman
- Feliz Clareianne Thea Recentes, Miss Philippines Air 2024
