= West Visayas State University Medical Center =

Government hospital in Iloilo City, Philippines

Geography
- Location: Eugenio Lopez St., Jaro, Iloilo City, Iloilo, Western Visayas, Philippines
- Coordinates: 10°42′57″N 122°33′40″E

Organization
- Care system: Public (government)
- Type: Academic, teaching, tertiary and research hospital
- Affiliated university: West Visayas State University

Services
- Standards: Tertiary care
- Beds: ~300

History
- Founded: 1940s as Don Benito Lopez Memorial Hospital; April 5, 1987 (but dates back in January 1986 as leased based hospital of West Visayas State University through a government purchase as West Visayas State University Hospital

Links
- Website: www.wvsu.edu.ph/wvsumc

West Visayas State University Medical Center (commonly referred to as WVSU Medical Center and WVSUMC but colloquially known as Don Benito) is a government owned hospital operated under the West Visayas State University. It was established in the 1940s after which when the Cacho family of Panay Electric Company (PECO) sold their property to the Philippine Women's College, then later to the Lopez family turning it into Don Benito Lopez Memorial Hospital (Don Benito Lopez Hospital).

When West Visayas State College become a university through a presidential decree in 1986, the need for the university to have a laboratory hospital for its college of medicine students paved the way, resulting in 1987, for the government to purchase the Don Benito Lopez Memorial Hospital (Don Benito Lopez Hospital), turning it into West Visayas State University Medical Center.

On November 29, 2001, the Department of Health of the Philippines - Bureau of Health Facilities and Services and the university's Board of Regents through approved the hospital's conversion to West Visayas State University Medical Center.

A Level III public hospital, WVSU Medical Center healthcare services include out-patient, in-patient, ancillary and allied health medical services. It also serves as a laboratory hospital for the clinical training of WVSU's nursing and medicine students.

It is subsequently forms as an auxiliary unit under the West Visayas State University but is autonomous in entity and management.

== History ==
=== Establishment ===
In the 1940s World War II, the Cacho family, an Ilonggo family of Spanish origin, rebuilt the family's power distribution business, the Panay Electric Company (PECO), by selling the family's property in Calle Eugenio Lopez (Eugenio Lopez St.) to the Philippine Women's College. Thereafter, the Lopez family bought the property to the college converting it to Don Benito Lopez Memorial Hospital, the base hospital for the medical and allied health sciences of the family run Iloilo City College which eventually became the University of Iloilo at present.

=== Government acquisition and founding ===
In February 1982, Former Vice President Fernando Lopez offered the Benito Lopez Memorial Hospital for lease/sale. President Lilia V. Juele, then President of the West Visayas State College took cognizance of the offer and recommended the purchase to the Minister of Education and Culture.

On May 7, 1982, the Board of Trustees, governing body of West Visayas State College, through Referendum No. 1 s. 1982 unanimously approved the request for the acquisition of the Benito Lopez Memorial Hospital. Although the contract of sale was made between West Visayas State College through President Lilia V. Juele and Lopez family through former Vice President Fernando Lopez, however it was not realized due to unavailability of funds from the government. In the meantime, a lease contract was made, so that in January 1986 the Gov. Benito Lopez Memorial Hospital was utilized as the base hospital of the School of Medicine with Dr. Angel R. de Leon as Director.

On April 5, 1987, Benito Lopez Memorial Hospital was finally purchased thru a GSIS loan and formally turned over by the Lopez family. In May 1987, the hospital became the West Visayas State University Hospital.

The Department of Health Bureau of Licensing and Regulation authorized the University Hospital to operate as a 150-bed tertiary training hospital with 100 beds for service/charity patients (25 for Surgery, 25 for Medicine, 25 for OB/Gyne, 25 for Pediatrics) and 50 beds for pay patients.

In 1988, the Department of Education Culture and Sports handed to the College of Medicine a revised organizational structure which gave the Dean of the College of Medicine governance of the University Hospital and a non-voting seat in the Board of Regent when matters pertaining to the College of Medicine and the University Hospital were presented. The Associate Dean - Clinics was delegated the day to day supervision and administration of the University Hospital.

=== 1990s to present ===
In January 1991, the Residency Training programs of the four (4) major clinical departments- Internal Medicine, General Surgery, Obstetrics and Gynecology and Pediatrics were accredited. In March 1992, Dr. Ramon S. Guerra Jr., assumed the position as Chief of Hospital II, as provided for in the organizational structure of the University Hospital. In 1993, the Board of Regents approved Resolution No. 85 series 1993 a Project Proposal to upgrade WVSU Hospital to become a Medical Center envisioned as "Philippine General Hospital of the South."

The University Hospital already has accredited residency-training programs in Surgery, OB-Gyne, Internal Medicine, Pediatrics, Orthopedics, Psychiatry, and Anesthesiology. For several years the hospital exceeded the 200-bed occupancy for its average daily census.

In April 2000, the Third Floor Annex was opened with 4 suite rooms, 18 single air-conditioned private rooms and 3 wards (4 male, 4 female and pediatric patients). The average occupancy rate of the hospital for year 2000 was 122% of the authorized 150 beds.

In the middle of January 2001, the University Hospital opened its Fourth Floor with 7 suite rooms and 19 air-conditioned private rooms. There is also an ongoing renovation of the left wing of the hospital to become charity wards. These expansion will bring to a total of 88 beds for pay patients and more than 200 for charity patients (Charity - Medicine - 50; Pediatrics - 50; OB-Gyne - 50; Surgery - 40; Psychiatry - 10; Orthopedics - 20; Pay- third floor - 35 patients; fourth floor - 33 patients; C-Up - 18 patients).

In anticipation of the implication of all these development in infrastructure of the University Hospital, last July 17, 2001, Dir. Ramon S. Guerra Jr., requested for an increase in the bed capacity of the West Visayas State University Hospital from 150 beds to 300 beds. This request was made in the desire to make this institution the best training ground for students and resident physicians, nurses and other paramedical groups, at the same time to render quality service to patients, not only of Iloilo, but the rest of Western Visayas.

A milestone for the WVSU happened when the Department of Health Bureau of Health Facilities and Services and the Board of Regents through Board Resolution No. 76 series of 2001, dated November 29, 2001, approved the hospital to become the West Visayas State University Medical Center.

In 2018, WVSU Medical Center along with another government hospital in Iloilo, received a 900 million Philippine Peso grant for infrastructural expansion. 600 million Philippine peso has been allocated to WVSU Medical Center which include a 3-storey DOH partnered WVSU Cancer Center for Western Visayas and the 10 storey WVSU Lung and Heart Center for Region VI, poising the hospital for its plans years before to become the Philippine General Hospital of the South.

During the onslaught of COVID 2019 global pandemic, WVSU Medical Center and Western Visayas Medical Center (WVMC) as government hospitals had been designated by the Department of Health (Philippines) as COVID 2019 dedicated hospitals for Western Visayas region. WVMC is the sole COVID 2019 sub-national laboratory in Region 6.

Presently, WVSU Medical Center, being a unit of West Visayas State University, is not under the Department of Health of the Philippines; however its policies and procedures are patterned after DOH and Philippine General Hospital (PGH) which is also tertiary, teaching and training hospital of a state university, the University of the Philippines Manila.
