= West Visayas State University =

Public university in Iloilo, Philippines

- Pamantasang Pampamahalaan ng Kanlurang Bisayas (Filipino)
- The University Official Seal
- Former names: Iloilo Normal School (1924–1965); West Visayas State College (1965–1986)
- Motto: Service, Harmony, Excellence
- Type: Public normal, research and co-educational higher education institution
- Established: 1902 (Organic unit of Philippine Normal School System under the American regime); 1924 (Formal establishment as Iloilo Normal School)
- Academic affiliations: AACCUP & PAASCU
- President: Dr. Joselito F. Villaruz
- Vice-president: Dr. Peter Ernie D. Paris (VP for Administration & Finance); Dr. Ma. Asuncion Christine V. Dequilla (VP for Academic Affairs); Dr. Greta G. Gabinete (VP for Research, Extension & Training); Dr. Celina C. Gellada (OVP for Medical & Allied Sciences)
- Faculty: 549 (Main Campus - Iloilo City): PhD / Ed. D / M.D. - 340; M.S. / M. A. / M. - 172; B. A. / B. S. / B. - 37
- Students: 9,286 (Iloilo City – Main Campus A.Y. 2022–2023): Basic education: 817; Baccalaureate: 6,608; Post-baccalaureate: 212; Graduate School Prog.: 1,871; Integrated Laboratory School: 595
- Location: Luna Street, La Paz, Iloilo City, Iloilo, Philippines; 10.7161°N 122.5614°E
- Campus: List; Main: La Paz, Iloilo City 9 hectares (90,000 m^{2}); Satellite: Lambunao, Iloilo 9.05 hectares (90,500 m^{2}); Janiuay, Iloilo 7.9 hectares (79,000 m^{2}); Calinog, Iloilo 52.3 hectares (523,000 m^{2}); Pototan, Iloilo 11.5 hectares (115,000 m^{2}); Himamaylan City Negros Occidental; Jaro, Iloilo City
- Colors: Blue Gold
- Nickname: West Marals
- Sporting affiliations: SCUAA, ISSAA
- Website: www.wvsu.edu.ph
- Location in the Visayas Location in the Philippines

West Visayas State University (WVSU, referred to colloquially by locals as West; Filipino: Pamantasang Pampamahalaan ng Kanlurang Bisayas) is a public normal research university located in La Paz, Iloilo City, Philippines. It was established in 1924 as Iloilo Normal School under the tutelage of the Thomasites, but dates back its founding in 1902 as a part of Philippine normal school system with Iloilo National High School established by the American colonial government. It later became West Visayas State College in 1965 and acquired its university status becoming West Visayas State University in 1986.

The university is one of the accredited Philippine Universities of the University Mobility in Asia and the Pacific and one of the most prominent institutions in the Philippines in the field of Teacher Education, Nursing and Medicine.

The West Visayas State University (WVSU) system is composed of the main campus, six external campuses (which are distinct from the main campus) and the WVSU Medical Center. The La Paz (main campus) is organized with an integrated laboratory school and twelve degree granting tertiary schools and colleges. In the collegiate level studies, the academic programs the university offers include Agriculture, Arts and Sciences, Biology, Business Management, Cooperatives Management, Forestry, Hospitality Management, Information and Communications Technology, Mass Communication, Medicine, Nursing, Operations Management, Political Science, Public Administration, Physical Education, Teacher Education and Tourism. The Law program of the university under the newly established College of Law was opened in August 2020, the first public law school in the Western Visayas region. It was later followed by the establishment of the College of Dentistry, the first state-supported dental school outside Manila.

The 2,000 hectare Mari-it Wildlife and Conservation Park which is managed as part of the 3,000 hectare WVSU College of Agriculture and Forestry campus in Lambunao, Iloilo, is the largest hornbill breeding facility in the world.

The Philippine Commission on Higher Education has also designated the university through its main campus as National Center of Excellence in Teacher Education and National Center of Development in Nursing while the Lambunao Campus as National Centers of Development in the programs of Agriculture and Forestry.

== History ==
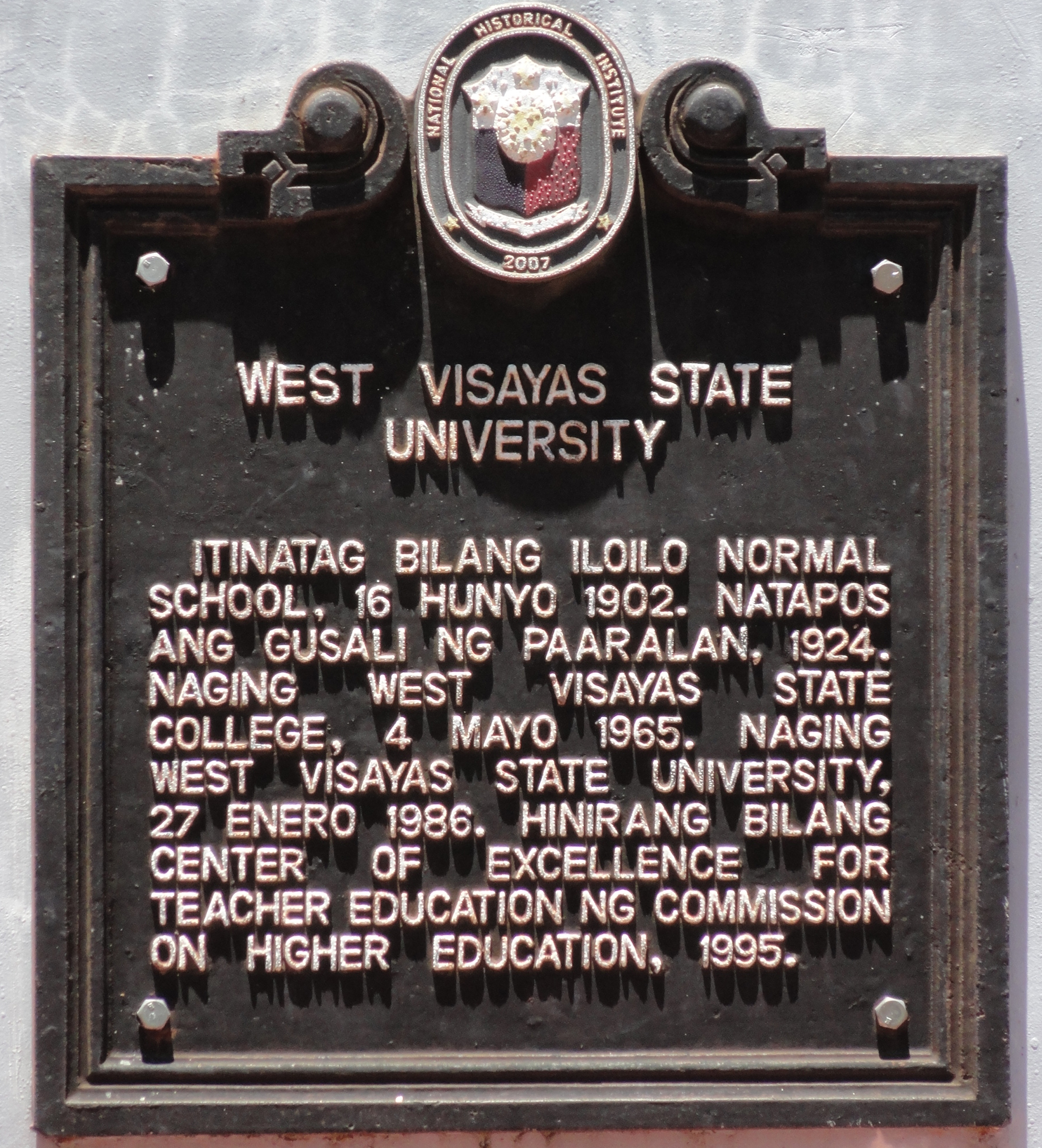
WVSU NHI historical marker

West Visayas State University (WVSU) was founded on June 16, 1902 as an adjunct unit with the Iloilo National High School of the Philippine Normal School system established under the American regime.

It was one of the five tributary schools created to address the need to train Filipino teachers under the tutelage of the Thomasites. In 1916, it was a secondary school, an adjunct with the Iloilo High School complete with elementary and training departments. In 1924, with the completion of its main building (now Quezon Hall) and laboratory school building, Iloilo Normal School was established as a distinct educational and independent institution. It was also when a secondary normal school program, which eventually became a four-year normal college course, was established.

In 1954, the Bachelor of Science in Education major in Elementary Education was offered, pioneering teacher-training institution in Western Visayas. It was named a Center of Excellence (1994) by the late Sen. Blas P. Ople and Center of Excellence for Teacher Education (1995) by the Commission on Higher Education (CHED).

The INS became the West Visayas State College by virtue of R.A. 4189 on May 4, 1965, and commenced the offering of the bachelor's degree in education for both elementary and secondary teaching, Bachelor of Arts; Master in Education. Also established were the Graduate School and the College of Arts and Sciences, (and consequently the Secondary Laboratory School) offering courses in the university level.

The period from 1974 to the early 1980s was one of marked growth, witnessing the establishment of the School of Medicine, the second state medical school in the Philippines in 1975, the School of Agriculture in 1976, and the School of Nursing in 1977. The doctoral program of the Graduate School was also founded in 1977. The B.S. in Biological Science, AB in Mass Communications, and B.S. Forestry programs began in 1981.

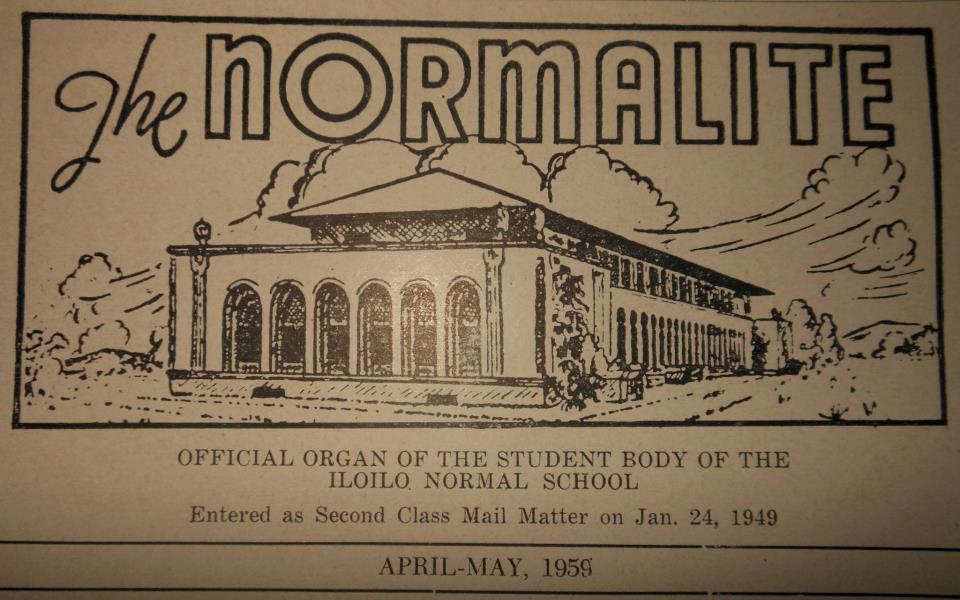
The Normalite nameplate, 1959

On January 27, 1986, the College became the West Visayas State University, integrating the Iloilo National College of Agriculture (INCA) into its system. In 1987, the University acquired the Don Benito V. Lopez Memorial Hospital which became the WVSU Hospital, a 150-bed tertiary, teaching and training hospital. The University further established in 1993, the Sports, Athletics, and Cultural Arts Center which later became the degree-granting PESCAR Institute and later PESCAR College in 2000. In 1993, the Department of Mass Communications became the degree-granting Institute of Mass Communications, which was later converted into a College in 2000. In 2001, the Board of Regents and the Department of Health (DOH) approved the conversion of the WVSU Hospital to WVSU Medical Center that it is now.

The enactment of the Higher Education Modernization Act (1997) brought more developments in the University. In 2000, four CHED-supervised schools in Calinog, Janiuay, Lambunao, and Pototan were integrated into the WVSU System. The University Distance Education program through the Diploma in Teaching (DIT) course began in Summer 2003. By 2005, the Local Government Unit of Himamaylan in Negros Occidental entered into a Memorandum of Agreement with WVSU for the establishment of the WVSU Himamaylan City Extension in 2006 which was later elevated to external campus from being an extension campus. Meanwhile, two new degree-granting units were also opened in the University: the Institute of Information and Communications Technology (IICT) in 2002 and the Institute of Management (IM) in 2006 which later became the College of Business and Management (2010).

In 2007, the university's administrators, scholars and histories collectively agreed to change the institution's founding especially on its logo from 1924 to 1902, the year WVSU was founded as a tributary unit of the Philippine Normal School System. ^{[a]} It was in the said year also (2007), that the university celebrated its centennial. A national historical marker was installed by the National Historical Commission of the Philippines on the main campus's Quezon Hall.

In February 2008, the university hosted an international research conference in Iloilo City, in conjunction with its year-long centennial celebration.

In July 2020, the West Visayas State University College of Law was established, the first public law school in Western Visayas. The following year, it opened its College of Dentistry, the second public university (after UP Manila), and the first public college outside of Manila, to offer a program in dentistry.

== Academics ==
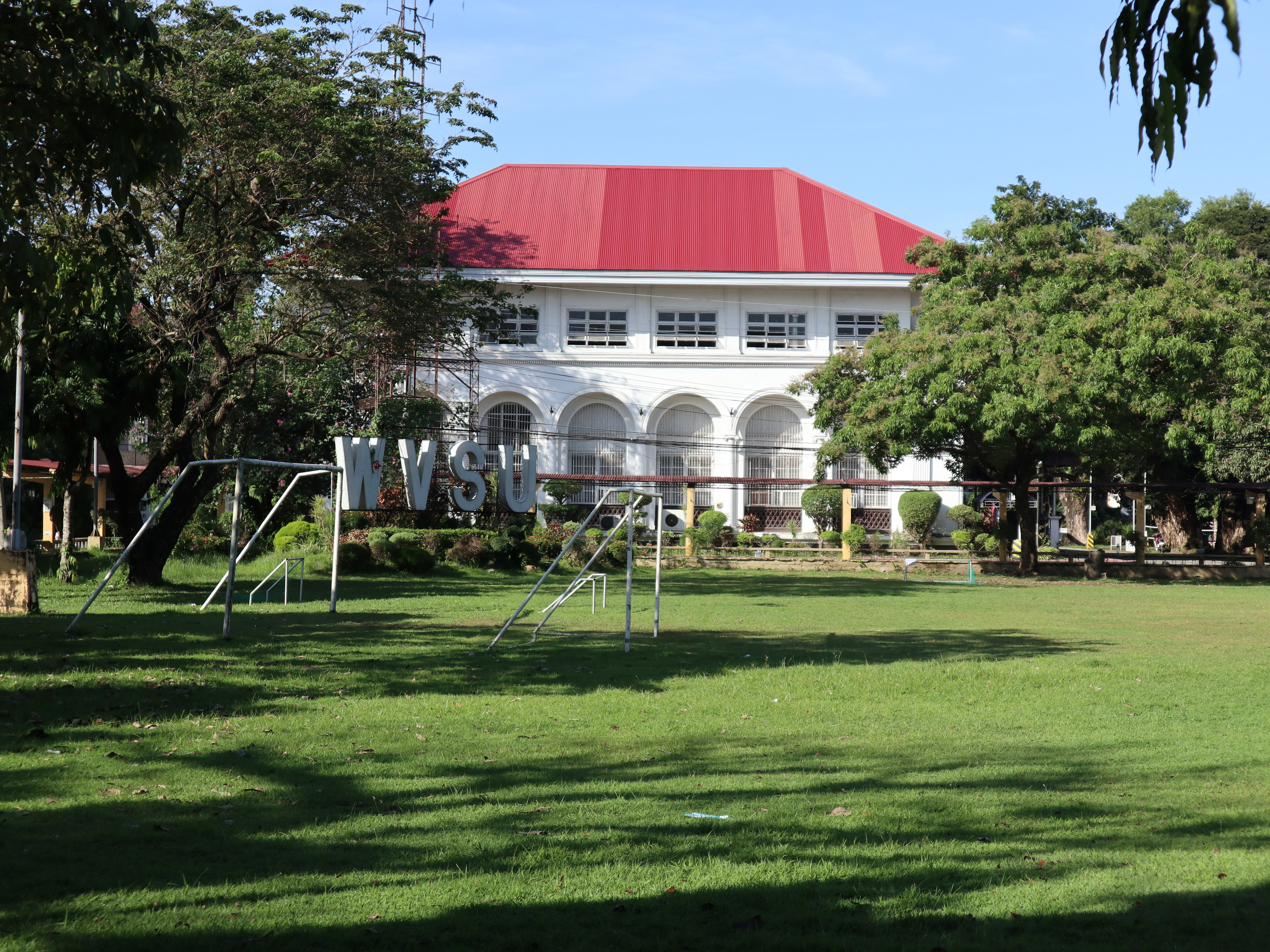
Quezon Hall

The university is organized into twelve academic granting units offering courses from grade school all the way to post-graduate education. Established as early as 1902, WVSU wasn't an independent and distinct institution until 1924 when it was formally founded as Iloilo Normal School.

=== Designations and accreditations ===
==== Designations ====
The main campus (La Paz) has been designated by the Commission on Higher Education (Philippines) as National Center of Excellence in Teacher Education and National Center of Development in Nursing Education, while the Lambunao Campus as National Centers of Development in Agriculture and Forestry.

WVSU is accredited by the Accrediting Agency of Chartered Colleges and Universities in the Philippines (AACCUP) and Philippine Accrediting Association of Schools, Colleges and Universities (PAASCU). The AACCUP is a member of the National Network of Quality Assurance Agencies, Inc. (NNQAA) in the Philippines. AACCUP and PAASCU are both members of Asia Pacific Quality Network (APQN) based in Hong Kong; and International Network of Quality Assurance Agencies in Higher Education (INQAAHE) based in Dublin, Ireland.

==== Accreditations ====
West Visayas State University is one of the first institutions to have its academic programs accredited to higher levels having surpassed the quality standards for instruction, research and extension. At present, programs are accredited by the Accrediting Agency of Chartered Colleges and Universities in the Philippines (AACCUP) and Philippine Accrediting Association of Schools, Colleges and Universities (PAASCU) for its College of Medicine. Programs recognized with Level III Re-accredited status are academic offerings in undergraduate and master's degree levels specifically Physical Education, Forestry, Agriculture, and programs in Communication (Broadcasting, Journalism and Development Communication). Level 4 qualified status was awarded to Nursing, Teacher Education (elementary, secondary, and special education), Arts and Social Sciences (English and Political Science) and Biology.

Over the years, the University has etched a mark in professional licensure examinations. Medical doctors, nurses and teacher education graduates have consistently topped exams all over the country and the university passing percentage in various exams have been well-above the national mean.

In 2004, WVSU was recognized by the Professional Regulation Commission (PRC) as among the "Top 5 Performing Schools" in the Philippines in the National Board Examinations.

=== Academic granting units ===
| College/Institute | Year |
|---|---|
| College of Education | 1902 |
| Integrated Laboratory School | 1924 |
| College of Arts and Sciences | 1965 |
| College of Medicine | 1975 |
| College of Nursing | 1977 |
| College of Agriculture and Forestry | 1976 |
| College of Communication | 1993 |
| College of PESCAR | 2000 |
| College of Information and Communications Technology | 2002 |
| College of Business and Management | 2007 |
| College of Law | 2020 |
| College of Dentistry | 2021 |

Commission on Higher Education (CHED)
Philippines

Centers of Excellence (COE)

Center of Excellence in Teacher Education (Main Campus)
Centers of Development (COD)
Center of Development in Agriculture (Main Campus - CAF Lambunao)
Center of Development in Forestry (Main Campus - CAF Lambunao)
Center of Development in Nursing (Main Campus)

WVSU programs in Nursing, Social Science, Biology and Education have been awarded for achieving Level 4 Qualified status by the Accrediting Agency for Chartered Colleges and Universities in the Philippines (AACCUP) Inc. WVSU College of Nursing had three of the top scorers on the 2014 Nurse Licensure Examination (NLE), and the school posted a 100% passing rate in the June 2016 NLE plus five top scorers. With the 100% passing rate, WVSU retains its record, for the fourth consecutive year, as Number 1 performing school in the NLE in the country.

Also at present, WVSU is one of the top performing schools in the Philippines for the Physician Licensure Examinations.

Among non-board examination courses, the University offers academic courses in English, Political Science, Microbiology, Biotechnology and Pre-Med. These three programs were submitted for accreditation to the AACCUP and were granted Level 4 Qualified status. Graduates from its Information Science and Technology, Cooperatives Management, and Mass Communications programs are employed in the region.

West's has also been cited with in the Western Visayas region through its programs in advanced education in the following disciplines: Arts and Letters, Sciences, Social Sciences and Governance, Education, Agriculture, and Communications. In 2010 the university was authorized to offer a graduate program in Hospitality Management in the College of Business and Management.

In July 2020, the legal education board approved and authorized WVSU to offer a Juris Doctor (JD) program under its newly established college of law, the first public law school in Western Visayas. Due to the demand and the university's answer to the government's plan for universal healthcare education program, West established the College of Dentistry in 2021, the second state university and college (SUC) to offer outside Manila and the first public institution of higher learning in Western Visayas.

=== Rankings ===
WVSU was awarded three stars by Quacquarelli Symonds (QS) Stars in 2021. It is the second university in Western Visayas to be ranked by QS, after Central Philippine University. In the QS Asian University Rankings 2025, WVSU was ranked in the 901+ range, and it was ranked 169th in the QS Asian University Rankings for Southeast Asia in 2025.

== Administration ==
The governance of the University is vested upon the Board of Regents of the West Visayas State University as constituted by P.D. no. 2019 and P.D. no. 1437. The Board of Regents exercise policy-making function in accordance with general policies, plans and programs on education as formulated by the Government.

The administration and the exercise of the University corporate powers are vested exclusively in the Board of Regents and the President of the University. It is an august body and works for the best interest of the University.

== Publications ==
Vital Signs Publication
- Amplifying The Pulse Of Truth
- Type: Student Publication
- School: West Visayas State University - College of Medicine
- Editor-in-chief: Franco Miguel Nodado & Sean Lerry Jim Claud
- Adviser: Eunice V. Sermonia, MD, FPPA
- Founded: 1989
- Ceased publication: 1991-1992
- Relaunched: 1992-present
- Language: English, Filipino, Hiligaynon, Kinaray-a
- Headquarters: 1st Floor, Roxas Hall, College of Medicine, West Visayas State University, La Paz, Iloilo City, Philippines
- City: Iloilo City
- Website: https://com.wvsu.edu.ph/vital-signs/

Vital Signs is the official publication of the West Visayas State University - College of Medicine. It was founded in 1989. It is located on the 1st floor of Roxas Hall, the WVSU - College of Medicine building.

== Notable alumni ==
- Liza Marcos (honoris causa) - Educator, lawyer, and first lady of the Philippines
- Jed Patrick Mabilog - Iloilo City Mayor and World Mayor Award Finalist (Top 4)
- Ferjenel Biron – Legislator
- Don Jose Maria Nava – WWII hero and Ilonggo Labor Leader

== Campuses ==
The West Visayas State University system is composed of the main campus in La Paz, Iloilo City, six external campuses, and the West Visayas State University Medical Center.

- West Visayas State University – Main Campus, in La Paz, Iloilo City, Philippines
- College of Agriculture and Forestry Campus, in Lambunao
- WVSU, Lambunao Campus, in Lambunao
- WVSU, Calinog Campus, in Calinog
- WVSU, Janiuay Campus, in Janiuay
- WVSU, Pototan Campus, in Pototan
- WVSU, Himamaylan City Campus, in Himamaylan City, Negros Occidental
