= Siayan, Zamboanga del Norte =

Municipality in Zamboanga del Norte, Philippines

Siayan
- Municipality
- Municipality of Siayan
- Seal
- Nickname: Pangase Town
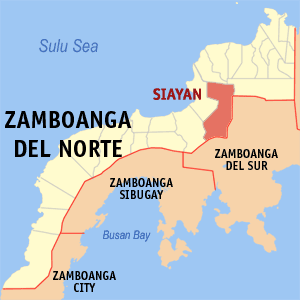
- Map of Zamboanga del Norte with Siayan highlighted
- Interactive map of Siayan
- Location within the Philippines
- Coordinates: 8°15′06″N 123°06′52″E
- Country: Philippines
- Region: Zamboanga Peninsula
- Province: Zamboanga del Norte
- District: 2nd district
- Named for: Siay and Ayan
- Barangays: 22 (see Barangays)

Government
  - Type: Sangguniang Bayan
  - Mayor: Alberto J. Bongcawel (Lakas)
  - Vice Mayor: Crisologo A. Decierdo (Lakas)
  - Representative: Irene G. Labadlabad (Lakas)
  - Municipal Council: Members: Estrella S. Zapatos; Geronimo M. Yosores, Jr.; Wencito B. Intoy; Daisy A. Limbang; Wilfredo A. Siasico; Billynel C. Catig; Raul P. Dominise; Roel J. Pabiran
  - Electorate: 28,072 voters (2025)

Area
  - Total: 494.75 km^{2} (191.02 sq mi)
- Elevation: 193 m (633 ft)
- Highest elevation: 682 m (2,238 ft)
- Lowest elevation: 19 m (62 ft)

Population (2024 census)
  - Total: 40,937
  - Density: 82.743/km^{2} (214.30/sq mi)
  - Households: 7,607

Economy
  - Income class: 1st municipal income class
  - Poverty incidence: 67.83% (2023)
  - Revenue: ₱ 263.1 million (2024)
  - Assets: ₱ 814.7 million (2024)
  - Expenditure: ₱ 100.5 million (2024)
  - Liabilities: ₱ 282.6 million (2024)

Service provider
  - Electricity: Zamboanga del Norte Electric Cooperative (ZANECO)
- Time zone: UTC+8 (PST)
- ZIP code: 7113
- PSGC: 0907215000
- IDD : area code: +63 (0)65
- Native languages: Subanon; Cebuano; Chavacano; Tagalog
- Website: siayan.gov.ph

Siayan, officially the Municipality of Siayan (Cebuano: Lungsod sa Siayan; Subanen: Benwa Siayan; Chavacano: Municipalidad de Siayan; Tagalog: Bayan ng Siayan), is a municipality in the province of Zamboanga del Norte, Philippines. According to the 2024 census, it has a population of 40,937 people.

== History ==
On October 1, 1964, President Diosdado Macapagal signed Executive Order No. 114, creating the municipality of Siayan by separating part of Sindangan. It was among those executive orders issued to create 33 municipalities, even their respective legislative bills did not pass Congress. However, vice-president Emmanuel Pelaez filed a special civil action for a writ of prohibition to void such issuances, which was unanimously granted by the Supreme Court in 1965 (Pelaez v. auditor general).

On June 17, 1967, Republic Act No. 4989 was enacted without executive approval, eventually recreating the municipality by separating 16 barrios, as originally proposed, from its mother entity.

In 1971, the seat of government was transferred from originally-designated Paranglumba to Siayan Proper. Barrio Siayan was created in 1959.

== Geography ==
=== Barangays ===
Siayan is politically subdivided into 22 barangays. Each barangay consists of puroks while some have sitios.

- Balok
- Balunokan
- Datagan
- Denuyan
- Diongan
- Dumogok
- Dumpilas
- Gonayen
- Guibo
- Gunyan
- Litolet
- Macasing
- Mangilay
- Moyo
- Muñoz
- Pange
- Paranglumba
- Poblacion
- Polayo
- Sayaw
- Seriac
- Soguilon

=== Climate ===
Climate data for Siayan, Zamboanga del Norte
Month	Jan	Feb	Mar	Apr	May	Jun	Jul	Aug	Sep	Oct	Nov	Dec	Year
Mean daily maximum °C (°F)	29 (84)	29 (84)	30 (86)	31 (88)	30 (86)	29 (84)	29 (84)	29 (84)	30 (86)	29 (84)	29 (84)	29 (84)	29 (85)
Mean daily minimum °C (°F)	23 (73)	23 (73)	23 (73)	23 (73)	24 (75)	24 (75)	24 (75)	24 (75)	24 (75)	24 (75)	24 (75)	23 (73)	24 (74)
Average precipitation mm (inches)	104 (4.1)	76 (3.0)	92 (3.6)	97 (3.8)	199 (7.8)	238 (9.4)	195 (7.7)	193 (7.6)	178 (7.0)	212 (8.3)	171 (6.7)	110 (4.3)	1,865 (73.3)
Average rainy days	14.7	12.5	15.8	17.5	27.6	28.5	29.0	27.5	26.9	27.9	23.5	18.2	269.6
Source: Meteoblue

== Demographics ==
Inhabitants in the municipality are Subanens, comprising about 70%, and Visayan migrants.

Population census of Siayan
Year	Pop.	±% p.a.
1970	9,193	—
1975	13,913	+8.67%
1980	18,420	+5.77%
1990	24,314	+2.82%
1995	27,950	+2.65%
2000	33,074	+3.67%
2007	34,588	+0.62%
2010	34,989	+0.42%
2015	34,966	−0.01%
2020	36,236	+0.75%
2024	40,937	+2.97%
Source: Philippine Statistics Authority

== Economy ==
Siayan was consistently the country's poorest municipality from 2003 to 2009, with almost the entire population (97.5% in 2006 and 2009) living below the poverty threshold based on data from the National Statistical Coordination Board. Education was also the problem, particularly to Subanens. Due to efforts by the local government to reduce the poverty incidence which was reduced by 50% by 2016, with households affected by food shortage decreased significantly from 25.22% to 1.17% within eight years until that year, the municipality reportedly ranked 36th as of 2017.

Pange, a village inhabited by mainly Subanens, is said being the farthest—about 23 kilometers away from Poblacion—where it would take almost a day for travel; and at the same time the municipality was the country's poorest, was the poorest as well. Since 2012, all barangays reportedly had already been lifted out of the below poverty line.

GMA 7 reporter Kara David did a documentary on the economic situation of Siayan. Poverty incidence in the town is 97.5% since 3 out of 4 earn an annual income of more than a dollar a month or 5,000.

Poverty incidence of Siayan (%)

Source: Philippine Statistics Authority

== Government ==
Mayors of the
Municipality of Siayan
Abundio B. Siasico, Sr., 1967-1985
Rudy S. Dominise, 1985-1986
Desiderio C. Romero, 1986-1987
Amado Mainque, 15 days in 1987
Alejandro L. Sarmiento, 1987-1988
Wilfredo A. Siasico, 1988-1998, 2007-2010
Abundio A. Siasico, Jr., 1998-2007
Flora L. Villarosa, 2010-2019
Daisy A. Limbang, 2019
Josecor S. Gepolongca, 2019-2022
Alberto J. Bongcawel, 2022-present

Siayan's local government structure is composed of one mayor, one vice mayor and eight councilors, named as Sangguniang Bayan members, all elected through popular vote. Three ex officio members are added to the Sangguniang Bayan with one representing Siayan's 22 Barangay Captains being the Association of Barangay Councils (ABC) President, one representing Siayan's 22 Barangay Youth Council Presidents being the Sangguniang Kabataan (SK) Federation President, and one representing a group of indigenous peoples of Siayan being the Indigenous Peoples Mandatory Representative (IPMR). Each official, with the exemption of the ABC and SK Presidents and IPMR, is elected publicly to a 3-year term and can be re-elected up to 3 terms in succession.
