= Janiuay =

Municipality in Iloilo, Philippines

- Municipality
- Municipality of Janiuay
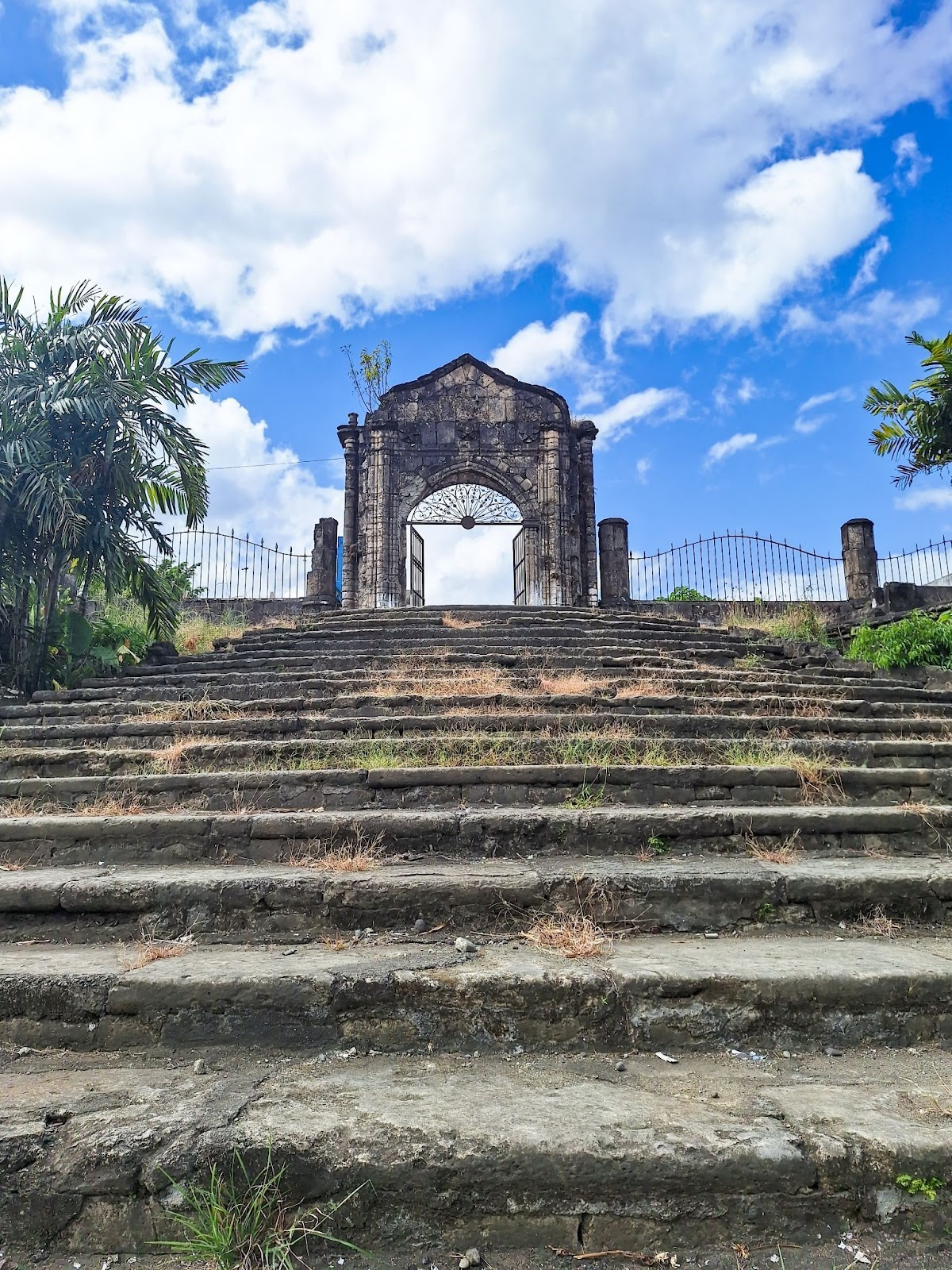
- Janiuay Cemetery

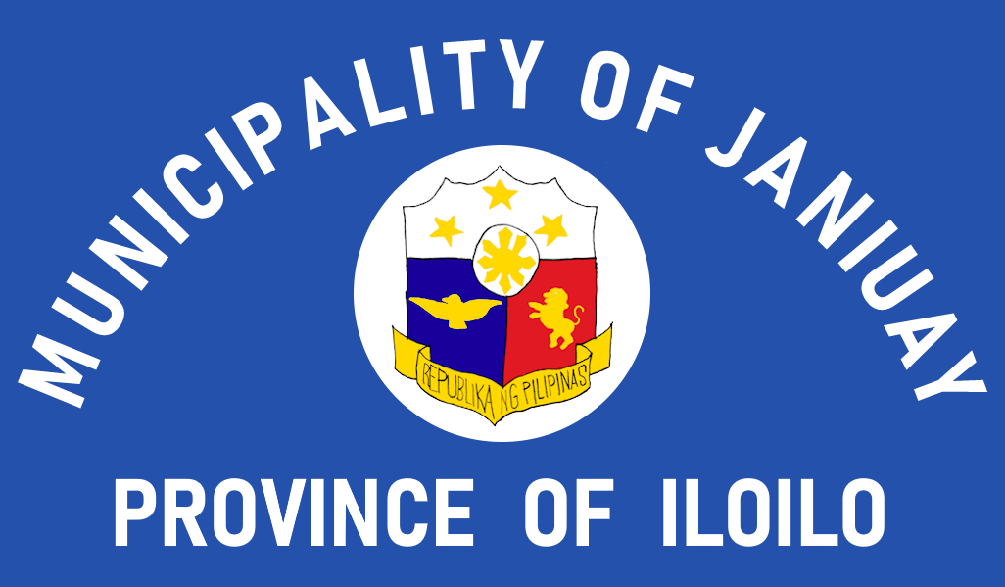
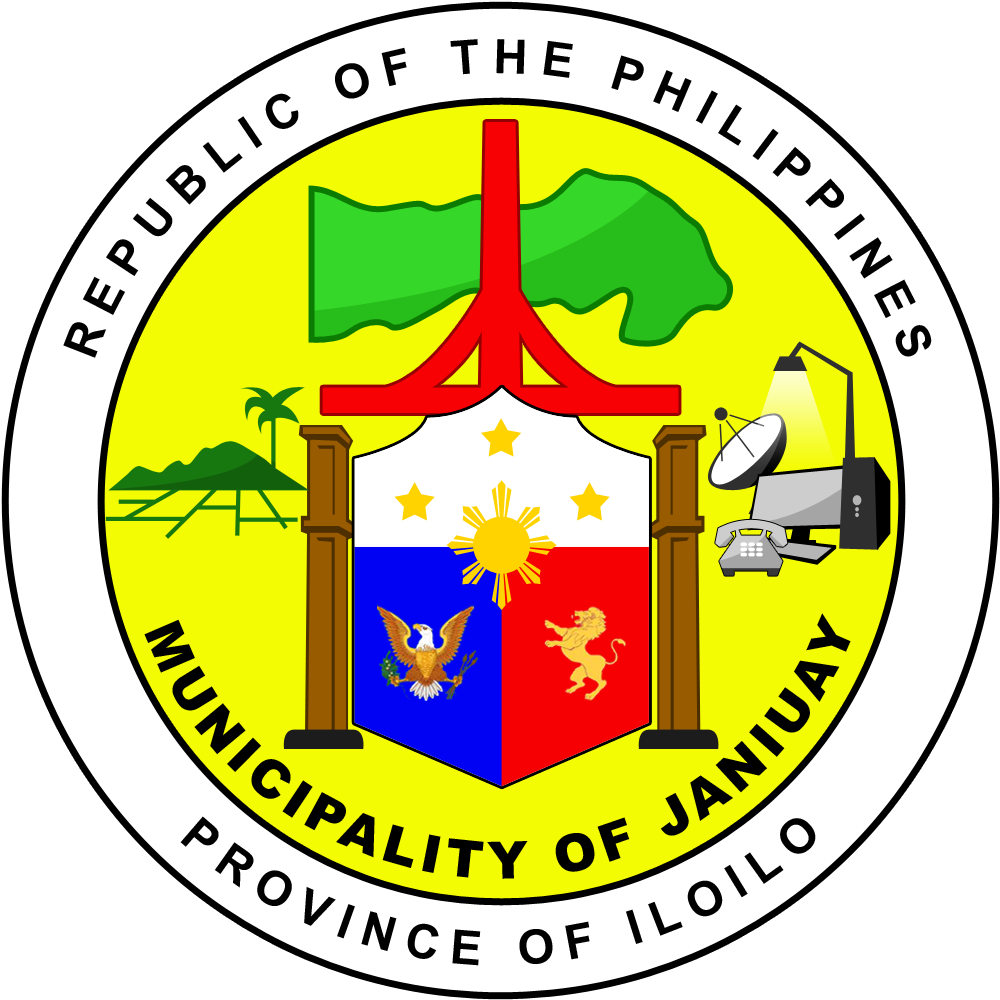
- Flag Seal

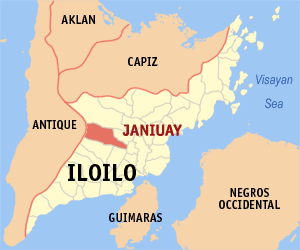
- Map of Iloilo with Janiuay highlighted
- Interactive map of Janiuay
- Location within the Philippines
- Coordinates: 10°57′N 122°30′E
- Country: Philippines
- Region: Western Visayas
- Province: Iloilo
- District: 3rd district
- Barangays: 60 (see Barangays)

Government
  - Type: Sangguniang Bayan
  - Mayor: Paulino M. Parian (PFP)
  - Vice Mayor: Felizardo D. Amigable, Jr. (PFP)
  - Representative: Lorenz R. Defensor (NUP)
  - Municipal Council: Members: Vicente E. Salarda (PDP); Gracia Marie D. Loffe (PDP); Leo C. Tallador (PDP); Jaime D. Bermejo, Jr. (PFP); Raymundo Egan C. Barranco (PFP); James Ian A. Adelantar (PDP); Glofil Joy N. Capadosa (PFP); Felix B. Barranco (PFP); Manuel Moley M. Locsin ^{‡}; Wilson King B. Salarda ^{◌}; ‡ ex officio ABC president; ◌ ex officio SK chairman
  - Electorate: 41,028 voters (2025)

Area
  - Total: 179.10 km^{2} (69.15 sq mi)
- Elevation: 180 m (590 ft)
- Highest elevation: 174 m (571 ft)
- Lowest elevation: 42 m (138 ft)

Population (2024 census)
  - Total: 67,509
  - Density: 376.93/km^{2} (976.26/sq mi)
  - Households: 16,380

Economy
  - Income class: 1st municipal income class
  - Poverty incidence: 16.74% (2023)
  - Revenue: ₱ 285.1 million (2024)
  - Assets: ₱ 1,050 million (2024)
  - Expenditure: ₱ 246.2 million (2024)
  - Liabilities: ₱ 279.2 million (2024)

Service provider
  - Electricity: Iloilo 2 Electric Cooperative (ILECO 2)
- Time zone: UTC+8 (PST)
- ZIP code: 5034
- PSGC: 063023000
- IDD : area code: +63 (0)33
- Native languages: Karay-a; Hiligaynon; Ati; Tagalog

Janiuay, officially the Municipality of Janiuay (Kinaray-a: Banwa kañg Janiuay, Hiligaynon: Banwa sañg Janiuay, Tagalog: Bayan nañg Janiuay, Spanish: Municipio de Janiuay), is a municipality in the province of Iloilo, Philippines. According to the 2024 census, it has a population of 67,509 people.

The town was created in 1769 and is noted for its Spanish era-built St. Julian of Cuenca church located atop the hill facing the municipal square, and the national historical landmark Janiuay Cemetery. It is also home to the West Visayas State University-Janiuay Campus and the first Protestant town in the country, Calvario.

Recent economic developments became a catalyst in the town's progress, and establishments like banks, malls, and retail markets have sprouted in the area - Gaisano Capital Janiuay of Gaisano Group and SM Savemore Express of SM Prime Holdings.

== History ==
In the summer of 1578, the natives of Tala-ugis trudged up from the coast to establish a settlement northward in the interior along Suage River. The first settlers were led by families of Gamuk, Hutikon, Uganet and Pagdakton, who settled themselves in what is currently known as barangays Matag-ub, Danao, Yabon and Quipot.

More than a century later, Spaniards came along these parts of Panay.

Early in 1738, Datu Buhawi of Yabon recognized the Spanish government, thus subjugating himself and his barangay to Spanish rule. But, Datu Dumagtol of nearby Ubian refused to follow suit. He led his subjects to the mountains to resist against the Spanish colonizers.

The Spanish governor Francisco Bayot de Ocampo recommended to the Principalía to transfer the seat of government, and in the following year (1770), the settlements were strengthened in their administration in what they called "Janiuay".

While there is no certainty, there are several legends of how the place got its name. One is that it came from the ruling Datu's sons named "Han" and "Oway". Another is that the words "hani" (whisper) and "oway" (rattan) were combined.

A strong typhoon followed by heavy rain in June 2008 caused the Suage river to overflow, damaging river bank communities and infrastructures. The flooding caused the river to be re-drawn and encroached the river banks by about 200 meters from its original location. Suage bridge remains structurally sound despite the flooding and encroachment.

== Geography ==
Two rivers coming from the north-west cuts in parallel through Janiuay. One is the Suage River and the other is the Magapa River which provide natural irrigation supporting the mainly agricultural town of Janiuay. The Suage river bridge was once witness to fierce fighting between Japanese Imperial forces and the combined Filipino and American troops including the recognized Ilonggo guerrilla fighters. The Magapa river bridge was built after World War II.

Janiuay is 33 kilometres (21 mi) from Iloilo City.

=== Barangays ===
Janiuay is politically subdivided into 60 barangays. Each barangay consists of puroks and some have sitios.

- Abangay
- Agcarope
- Aglobong
- Aguingay
- Anhawan
- Atimonan
- Balanac
- Barasalon
- Bongol
- Cabantog
- Calmay
- Canawili
- Canawillian
- Caranas
- Caraudan
- Carigangan
- Cunsad
- Dabong
- Damires
- Damo-ong
- Danao
- Gines
- Guadalupe
- Jibolo
- Kuyot
- Madong
- Manacabac
- Mangil
- Matag-ub
- Monte-Magapa
- Pangilihan
- Panuran
- Pararinga
- Patong-patong
- Quipot
- Santo Tomas
- Sarawag
- Tambal
- Tamu-an
- Tiringanan
- Tolarucan
- Tuburan
- Ubian
- Yabon
- Aquino Nobleza East (Poblacion)
- Aquino Nobleza West (Poblacion)
- R. Armada (Poblacion)
- Concepcion Pob. (D.G. Abordo)
- Golgota (Poblacion)
- Locsin (Poblacion)
- Don T. Lutero Center (Poblacion)
- Don T. Lutero East (Poblacion)
- Don T. Lutero West Pob
- Crispin Salazar North (Poblacion)
- Crispin Salazar South (Poblacion)
- San Julian (Poblacion)
- San Pedro (Poblacion)
- Santa Rita (Poblacion)
- Capt. A. Tirador (Poblacion)
- S. M. Villa (Poblacion)

=== Santo Tomas ===
Santo Tomas approximate population is 500–800. Santo Tomas (Pakol to locals) is bounded by Madong in the east, Mangil in the north-east and Danao in the south west. It is accessible by three class C feeder roads in the east, south-west and south-east. Agriculture centers around rice, corn, coffee, beans, sugar cane, and copra. Traces of sweet mango farms are starting to gain roots especially close by the public elementary school. General topography is flat rice fields on the east and hill-valley-hill dotted by bamboos, coffee, mango, banana, coconuts and other fruit tree crops in the remaining areas. Water source are via deepwells and rice produce is primarily dependent on rainfall.

Motorbike and tricycle are the easiest mode of transportation and also four-wheels during festive events. Ride is some 30 minutes from the town proper. Electricity is subscribed by 15-25% of the population. Wireless cellphone carrier SMART covers the area and is generally available in 20-25% of the population. English language is generally understood and spoken fairly by locals in certain situation with foreigners.

Danao-Santo Tomas Elementary School established during the 1950s is located on the highest hill of the surrounding barangays and view of rice fields in the east is impressive especially in the morning. An old artesian well stands within the school grounds - part of an effort to secure deep water for the school in the 1960s (WVA).

=== Danao ===
Pueblo Danao has a history. It was established by Fr. Eugenio Moya in 1766. It lasted for eight years until Fr. Moya was forced to move to adjacent Pueblo Yabon for fear on his life on errant moros and the locales. The moros and the locales set camp in the forest of Danao away from forced labor edict from Spanish Principalia and administered by priests of Poblacion Janiuay. The moros and the locales raised in arms against Catholic conversion and had attempted to poison and kill Fr. Moya. Pueblo Danao became a prized possession disputed by Pueblo Quipot and Principalia Masin (now Maasin) because of its rich farmland in the west bounded by the Suage river and the rumor about rich mineral deposits in the hills of Kantong (now Danao Gantong). When Pueblo Quipot was moved to Poblacion Janiuay in 1769, Pueblo Danao was downgraded to a barrio and became part of Janiuay.

Danao is divided into three mini locales (mini-barrangay), Danao I, Danao 2 and Danao Gantong. Each mini barangay has about a population of 300- 400. Danao is bounded by Santo Tomas (North-West), Mangil (North), Madong (East), Tambal (South-West), Calmay (West), Caraudan (West) and Aguingay (South-West).

It is accessible by two class C feeder roads from Poblacion Janiuay in the east, south-west and south-east. Agriculture centers around rice, corn, coffee, beans, sugar cane, and copra. Traces of sweet mango farms are starting to gain roots especially close by the public elementary school. General topography is flat rice fields on the east and hill-valley-hill dotted by bamboos, coffee, mango, banana, coconuts and other fruit tree crops in the remaining areas. Water source are Suage river in the south-west and via deepwells and seasonal rainfall in the east.

Four wheels are a means of transportation including motorbike and tricycle. Ride is some 30 minutes from the town proper. Electricity is subscribed by 15-25% of the population. Wireless cellphone carrier SMART covers the area and is generally available in 20-25% of the population. English language is generally understood and spoken fairly by locals in certain situation with foreigners.

Danao-Santo Tomas Elementary School established during the 1950s straddles Sto- Tomas and Danao Gantong. An old artesian well stands north of the school grounds - part of an effort to secure deep water for the school in the 1960s (WVA). It is believed that the well was an exploratory bore hole to determine and analyze the mineral content of the sub-surface of the surrounding area. Bore hole samples including sediment samples from surrounding open wells (Rapo, Brasileno, Casiple) were collected and sent for analysis. No new samples are requested by the Bureau of Mines. lorenzo arillo is the longest brgy. captain of brgy. danao (1960-2003).

=== Matag-ub ===
Matag-ub was formerly Pueblo Binogsukan in 1766. Aetas set camp in these areas helping the Moros raid and fight wars with the Augustinian priests Marin, Carvajal, Gorrosari and Llorente of Poblacion Janiuay for forced labor erecting the churches and cemetery of Poblacion Janiuay.

=== Climate ===
Climate data for Janiuay, Iloilo
Month	Jan	Feb	Mar	Apr	May	Jun	Jul	Aug	Sep	Oct	Nov	Dec	Year
Mean daily maximum °C (°F)	29 (84)	30 (86)	32 (90)	33 (91)	31 (88)	30 (86)	29 (84)	29 (84)	29 (84)	29 (84)	29 (84)	29 (84)	30 (86)
Mean daily minimum °C (°F)	22 (72)	22 (72)	22 (72)	23 (73)	25 (77)	25 (77)	24 (75)	24 (75)	24 (75)	24 (75)	23 (73)	22 (72)	23 (74)
Average precipitation mm (inches)	48 (1.9)	41 (1.6)	58 (2.3)	82 (3.2)	223 (8.8)	300 (11.8)	346 (13.6)	307 (12.1)	311 (12.2)	292 (11.5)	167 (6.6)	81 (3.2)	2,256 (88.8)
Average rainy days	11.4	7.7	11.3	15.4	25.7	28.5	29.5	28.7	28.3	28.7	21.8	15.2	252.2
Source: Meteoblue

== Demographics ==
Population census of Janiuay
Year	Pop.	±% p.a.
1903	20,738	—
1918	24,641	+1.16%
1939	38,778	+2.18%
1948	44,348	+1.50%
1960	46,946	+0.48%
1970	34,409	−3.06%
1975	39,172	+2.63%
1980	40,120	+0.48%
1990	47,253	+1.65%
1995	50,066	+1.09%
2000	54,166	+1.70%
2007	57,878	+0.92%
2010	63,031	+3.15%
2015	63,905	+0.26%
2020	66,786	+0.93%
2024	67,509	+0.26%
Source: Philippine Statistics Authority

In the 2024 census, the population of Janiuay was 67,509 people, with a density of 380 inhabitants per square kilometre or 980 inhabitants per square mile.

== Economy ==
Poverty incidence of Janiuay

Source: Philippine Statistics Authority

Cultivation of rice, corn, sugar, copra, coffee, banana, abaca fiber, fowls (and gamefowls), goat and cattle raising are the main sources of livelihood. Commerce for these products are generally brought into the town proper for market. The rainfall generally dictate the commerce of these products as the river go dry in summer months.

Most of these are coming from the west, north-west and south-west of the town.

== Infrastructure ==
สวนนี้ว่าง

=== Energy ===
Electricity is sourced from electric cooperative Ileco II supplying 75% of the town proper and about 25% of the neighboring barangays.

=== Transportation ===
Janiuay can be accessed from all directions with good paved concrete and asphalt road infrastructures from the east, north and south. Mode of transport can either be jeeps, motorcycles fitted with cabs for 2-5 persons locally known as tricycles for inter barangay transport. Intertowns are plied by buses, jeeps and private vans. Within the town, "trysikad" - a bicycle fitted with a cab for 2 people are commonly available.

== Tourism ==
=== Heritage buildings ===
Janiuay prides itself on two heritage infrastructure dating back from 1760.

The Janiuay Catholic Church, dedicated to its patron, St. Julian of Cuenca was built of sandstone, limestone and layered bricks and was completed February 1770. Its belfry used to carry three magnificent bells, the largest weighing close to a ton. World War II damaged the belfry, and the bells were lowered to ground after the war. The largest bell crashed down during the relocation and suffered a crack 18 inches (460 mm) in length from its lip upwards. When sounded it gives a distinct baritone rattling sound that can be heard for miles. It is now mounted in the new church's belfry built in the late 60s.

Another heritage infrastructure is the Janiuay Cemetery. It was built much later, in 1870, and is also walled with ancient sandstone and bricks brought from distant locale some 30 km away in what is now known as the town of Dingle. Spanish Fr. Llorente directed the construction of this cemetery in the Gothic design of his time. The Janiuay town cemetery is located a kilometer east of Janiuay Catholic Church.

Janiuay is also home to several heritage mini sugar mills owned by landed Spanish mestizos and Swiss descent. These mini sugar mills have seen their own time and once produces brown sugar. Wrought steel rotary crushers driven by water buffaloes or carabaos extract sugar from canes and cooked in large vat until brown and solid.

=== Other landmarks ===
- Janiuay Old Prison and Town Hall - Post Hispanic infrastructure with 24-inch-thick (610 mm) walls and wrought iron bars.
- Janiuay Pilot Elementary School - established before World War II
- Janiuay National Vocational School - (Now West Visayas State University - Janiuay Campus) - established before World War II.
- Janiuay Protestant Church - First outside of Iloilo City
- Iglesia ni Cristo Church in Barangay Jibolo
- Janiuay Public Market
- Janiuay Cattle Market - the only in Iloilo Province.
- Janiuay Town Hall and Plaza
- Janiuay Public Library
- St. Elizabeth Academy (Now St. Julian Academy) established in the 1960s
- Janiuay Emergency Hospital. Back in operation after Suage river overflow caused by heavy rain and typhoon in June 2008.
- Don Juan Wuthrich Estate in Barangay Jibolo
- Don Jose Marin Estate and house in Santa Rita
- Lutero Estate in Barangay Tambal and Barangay Kinambud
- Locsin Estate in Barangay Guadalupe
- Camarista House in San Julian St.
- Suage River Breakwater - A kilometer long concrete breakwater from Esperanza St. to Aquino Nobleza St.
- Calmay Elementary and High School - biggest public school outside and west of Poblacion Janiuay.
- Barangay Ubian, Yabon and Quipot - seat of pre-Spanish Janiuay in 1578 to 1760. Moved to its current location on or before 1760 by the Spanish Principalia. About 22 km. west of Janiuay.
- Quipot Wier - A natural wier located at sito Punong. These are two big massive land mass blocking entry of downstream Suage river to the Janiuay Poblacion and beyond. About 22 km west of Poblacion Janiuay. WVA Post Note: The two massive land mass is now covered with sand, soil and debris after the June 2008 heavy rain and typhoon. Two opposing stone boulders seen today are a trace of once the beautiful Quipot Weir playing with the graceful flow of Suage River which can cast its angry might at any moments notice.
- Barasalon Falls - located in sitio Igbiating. Up inland and about 15 km from Barangay Yabon. WVA Post Note: Baby falls at both sides started to appear.

== Education ==
There are Janiuay schools district offices which govern all educational institutions within the municipality. They oversee the management and operations of all private and public, from primary to secondary schools. These are the:

- Janiuay I Schools District
- Janiuay II Schools District

Primary and elementary schools

- Abangay Elementary School
- Aglobong Elementary School
- Aguingay Elementary School
- Alegario Center for Excellence Learning School
- Atimonan Elementary School
- Balanac Elementary School
- Calmay Elementary School
- Calvario Mem. Christian School
- Canauili Elementary School
- Canauillan Elementary School
- Caranas Primary School
- Carigangan Primary School
- CenterPhil Montessori Learning Center
- Cunsad Primary School
- Dabong Elementary School
- Danao-Sto. Tomas Elementary School
- Don Jose Locsin Memorial Elementary School
- Dr. P.B. Margarico Memorial Elementary School
- Gems of Tomorrow Learning Center
- Janiuay Christian Academy
- Janiuay Pilot Elementary School
- Jibolo Elementary School
- Juan C. Locsin Memorial School
- Kuyot Elementary School
- Leon Consumo Memorial Elementary School
- Madong Central Elementary School
- Mañacabac Elementary School
- Mangil Elementary School
- Martin Tirador Memorial Elementary School
- Monte Magapa Elementary School
- Pangilihan Elementary School
- Panuran Primary School
- Pararinga Elementary School
- St. Julian Academy
- Tambal Elementary School
- Tamu-an Elementary School
- Tiringanan Primary School
- Tolarucan Elementary School
- Ubian Elementary School
- Yabon Elementary School

Secondary schools

- Abangay National High School
- Agcarope Integrated School
- Barasalon Integrated School
- Calmay National High School
- Janiuay National Comprehensive High School
- Major Manuel A. Aaron Memorial National High School
- Quipot National High School
