= Paramount rulers in early Philippine history =

Aspect of Philippine history

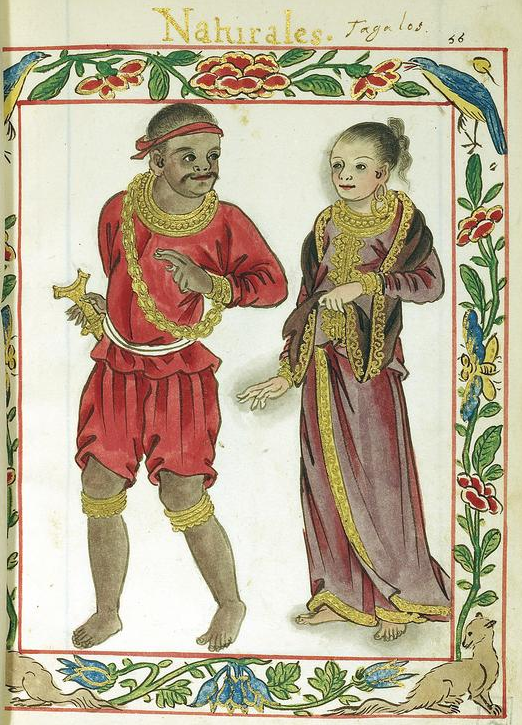
An image from the Boxer Codex (c. 1590) supposedly portraying a native Tagalog ("naturales tagalos") couple, presumed by Professor Charles Ralph Boxer to be Tagalogs from the Maginoo class.

The term Paramount Ruler, or sometimes Paramount Datu, is a term used by historians to describe the highest ranking political authorities in the largest lowland polities or inter-polity alliance groups in early Philippine history, most notably those in Maynila, Tondo, Pangasinan, Cebu, Bohol, Butuan, Cotabato, and Sulu.

== Titles of paramount rulers in different Filipino people groups ==
Different cultures of the Philippine archipelago used different titles to refer to the most senior datu, or leader, of the Bayan or precolonial barangay.

In Muslim polities such as Sulu and Cotabato, the Paramount ruler was called a Sultan. In Tagalog communities, the equivalent title was Lakan. In communities which historically had strong political or trade connections with Indianized polities in Indonesia and Malaysia, the Paramount Ruler was called a Rajah. Among the Subanon people of the Zamboanga Peninsula, a settlement's Datus answer to a Thimuay, and some Thimuays are sometimes additionally referred to as Thimuay Labi, or as Sulotan in more Islamized Subanon communities. In some other portions of the Visayas and Mindanao, there was no separate name for the most senior ruler, so the Paramount ruler was simply called a Datu, although one Datu was identifiable as the most senior.

== Selection and mechanisms of influence ==
Although Junker notes that a position as paramount leader could be passed on through heredity, the inheritor would still have to prove himself worthy of the position, through a combination of personal charisma, capable leadership, and prowess in war. In this way, Jocano notes that this Paramount Datu was chosen by the Datus from among themselves, a situation Jocano likened to "’a living democracy".’

Junker describes these alliances of rulers as "alliance groups", which she describes as having "a relatively decentralized and highly segmentary structure" similar to other polities in Maritime Southeast Asia.

Junker notes:

"In the Philippines, the primary unit of collective political action appears to have been an organizationally more fluid "alliance group," comprising individuals whose recruitment into the group involved a variety of both kinship-based and non-kinship based relations (including principles of cognatic descent, as well as forms of ritual friendship). These alliance units, made up of perpetually shifting leader-focused factions, represented the extension of […] power over individuals and groups through various alliance-building strategies, but not over geographically distinct districts or territories."

Junker then proceeds to identify a number of mechanisms through which horizontal alliances between local chiefs were established and maintained through a variety of mechanisms

- the institutionalized system of reciprocal gift exchange; (Note: As an example of this, Junker (1990) cites Chirino 1604:145; Loarca 1582:93.})
- intermarriage between elite members of different alliance groups; (Note: As an example of this, Junker (1990) cites Chirino 1604:294-295, and recommends the analysis of Ileto 1971:34-35 and Keesing 1962:151-152.) and
- mutual participation in ritual oath-taking as a symbolic expression of political solidarity. (Note: As an example of this, Junker (1990) cites Legaspi, 1565:201; Loarca 1582:160-163; Pigafetta 1521:56,77,79; Seuilla1566:225; and the sixteenth-century Boxer manuscript, in Jocano 1975:233.)

== Limited powers ==
Neither Datus nor Paramount Datus functioned as Monarchs in any strict academic sense. The Datu's ability to exercise power over the members of their Barangay was not absolute, and their control over territory was a function of their leadership of the Barangay, rather than any concept of "divine right." Furthermore, their position was dependent on the democratic consent of the members of the Barangay's aristocratic (maginoo) class. Although the position of Datu could be inherited, the maginoo could decide to choose someone else to follow within their own class, if that other person proved a more capable war leader or political administrator.

Rulers from Philippine polities were sometimes referred to in Hokkien Chinese: 王; Pe̍h-ōe-jī: Ông; lit. 'King', 'Monarch' by the Chinese officials they conducted trade with mainly from Southern Fujian, and later initially understood by early Spanish chroniclers such as Pigafetta and Rodrigo de Aganduru Moriz as 'Kings'. However, this was a function of language, and of the respective sinocentrism and hispanocentrism of these early records, rather than ethnographic observation of the way power was exercised locally. Since both the Chinese and the Spanish came from cultures which were politically organized around a belief in the divine right of monarchs, they tended to project their beliefs into the peoples they encountered during trade and conquest. In a more careful ethnographic observation, San Buenaventura (1613, as cited by Junker, 1990 and Scott, 1994) later noted that Tagalogs only applied the term Hari (King) to foreign monarchs, rather than their own leaders.

Although popular portrayals and early nationalist historical texts sometimes depict Philippine paramount rulers as having broad sovereign powers and holding vast territories, critical historiographers such as Jocano, Scott, and Junker explain that historical sources clearly show paramount leaders exercised only a limited degree of influence, which did not include claims over the barangays and territories of less-senior datus.

For example, F. Landa Jocano, in his seminal work "Filipino Prehistory:Rediscovering Precolonial Heritage", notes:

"Even if different Barangays entered into alliances with one another, there was no sovereign datu over them. Each datu ruled his barangay independently. The alliances were limited to mutual protection and assistance in times of need. It did not entail permanent allegiance. The grouping was based on consensus. Whoever was chosen by the groups as their leader exercised leadership and asserted authority over them. It was a living democracy...Barangay alliances were loosely defined. These were often based on kinship and marriage. Each Barangay remained independent and enjoyed freedom from external control. That was why Lapulapu resisted the attempt of Magellan to make him acknowledge the lordship of Humabon. The same was true of the other datus who resisted coercive efforts of the Spaniards to make them subservient to other Datus."

Keifer compares this situation to similarly-structured African polities where "component units of the political structure consist of functionally and structurally equivalent segments integrated only loosely by a centralized authority dependent on the consensual delegation of power upwards (sic) through the system." Junker, expounding further on Keifer's work, notes:

..."While political leadership followed an explicitly symbolized hierarchy of rank [...] this leadership hierarchy did not (sic) constitute an institutionalized chain of command from center to periphery. Political allegiance was given only to the leader immediately above an individual with whom a kin group had personal ties of economic reciprocity and loyalty."

This explanation of the limited powers of a paramount leader in cultures throughout the Philippine archipelago explains the confusion experienced by Martin de Goiti during the first Spanish forays into Bulacan and Pampanga in late 1571. Until that point, Spanish chroniclers continued to use the terms "king" and "kingdom" to describe the polities of Tondo and Maynila, but Goiti was surprised when Lakandula explained there was "no single king over these lands", and that the leadership of Tondo and Maynila over the Kapampangan polities did not include either territorial claim or absolute command. Antonio de Morga, in his work Sucesos de las Islas Filipinas, expounds:

"There were no kings or lords throughout these islands who ruled over them as in the manner of our kingdoms and provinces; but in every island, and in each province of it, many chiefs were recognized by the natives themselves. Some were more powerful than others, and each one had his followers and subjects, by districts and families; and these obeyed and respected the chief. Some chiefs had friendship and communication with others, and at times wars and quarrels. These principalities and lordships were inherited in the male line and by succession of father and son and their descendants. If these were lacking, then their brothers and collateral relatives succeeded... When any of these chiefs was more courageous than others in war and upon other occasions, such a one enjoyed more followers and men; and the others were under his leadership, even if they were chiefs. These latter retained to themselves the lordship and particular government of their own following, which is called barangay among them. They had datos and other special leaders [mandadores] who attended to the interests of the barangay."

== Prominent historical examples ==
=== Prominent Sultans ===
- Sultan Muhammad Dipatuan Kudarat

=== Prominent Thimuay ===
- Thimuay Gumabongabon
- Thimuay Imbing

=== Prominent Lakans ===
- Bunao Lakan Dula
- Lakan Tagkan

=== Prominent Rajahs ===
- Rajah Humabon
- Rajah Kalamayin
- Rajah Ache
- Rajah Sulayman

== See also ==
- Paramount Ruler - for generic use of the term (outside the Philippines)
- Sultan § Southeast and East Asia
- Thimuay
- Lakan
- Raja § Usage outside India
- Precolonial barangay
- Lacandola Documents
