= Buklog =

Thanksgiving ritual of the Subanen people

Buklog, thanksgiving ritual system of the Subanen
- UNESCO Intangible Cultural Heritage
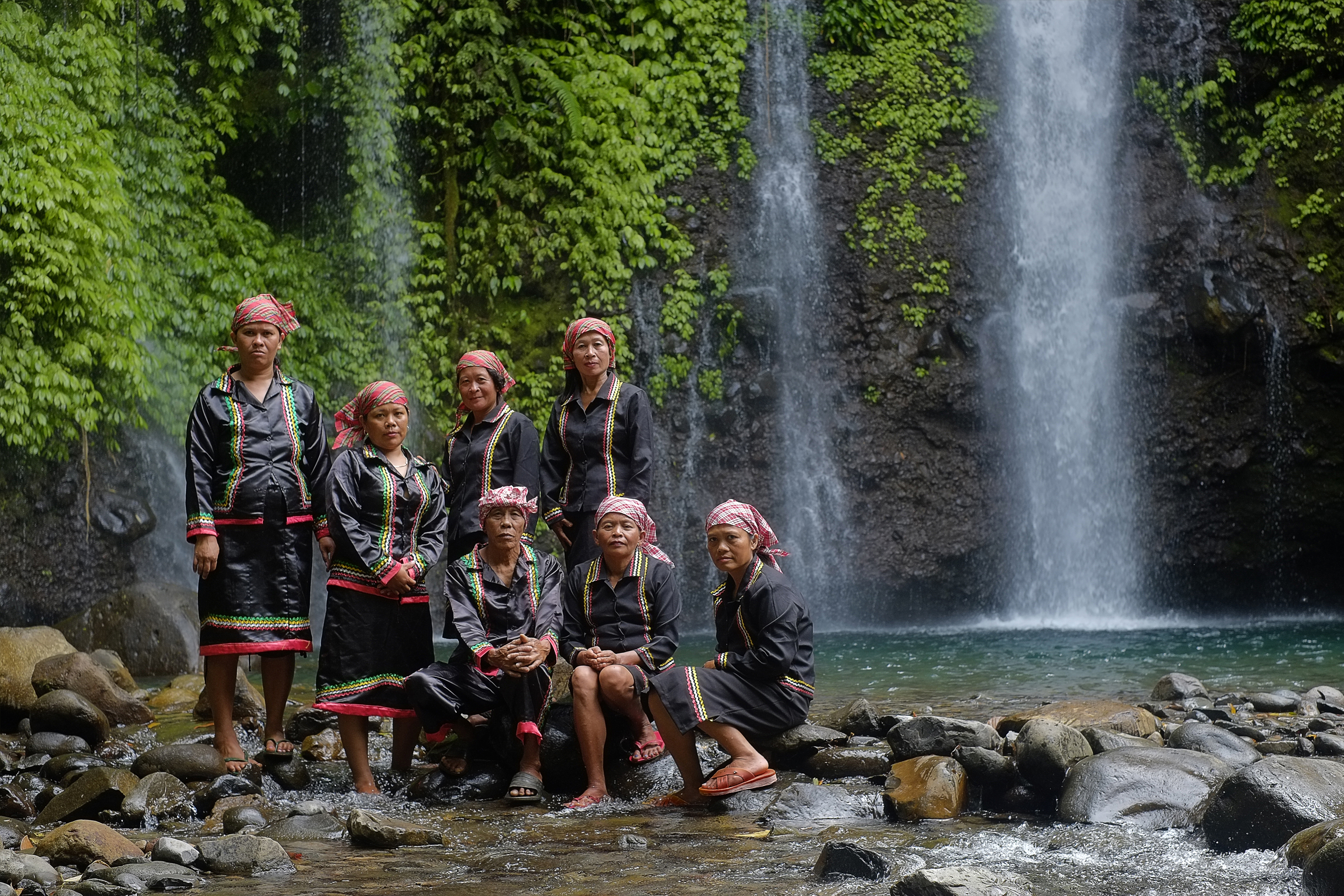
- Buklog is practiced by the Subanen indigenous people
- Country: Philippines
- Reference: 01495
- Region: Asia and the Pacific

Inscription history
- Inscription: 2019 (14th session)
- List: Need of Urgent Safeguarding
- Threats: Deforestation, diminishing participation, diminishing youth interest, insufficient financial resources, intolerance, loss of cultural spaces, loss of significance, population influx, rural-urban migration

Buklog is a cultural tradition from the Philippines in the form of a thanksgiving ritual practiced by the Subanen people who live on the Zamboanga Peninsula, the southern part of the Philippines. This ritual system is carried out as a form of gratitude to the spirits for positive life experiences, such as abundant harvests, recovery from an illness or calamity, or recognition of newly appointed leaders.

Buklog is carried out by involving three elements, namely humans, nature and the spirit world. This tradition is usually led by a timuay or village head, and facilitated by a balyan or local religious leaders. During the ritual, the village head and the villagers will ask permission from the spirits around him to collect various materials from the forest. Then, they make offerings to invite the dead spirits to join the feast. Also, it was followed by a dance on top of a raised wooden structure called a 'buklog'. This activity creates a sound that is believed to be the voice of the spirits.

Buklog is believed to originate from a folklore that was developed by the Subanen community hundreds of years ago. This story was first popularized by Thimuay Imbing, a tribal leader in the 1800s and then passed down to later generations until finally, the legend persisted, especially among the balyans.

== Story ==
The Buklog folklore talks of Jobrael, a half-human and half-deity being, who lived for 1,000 years. One day, Diwata Magbabaya, the supreme god who created heaven and earth, ordered Jobrael to return to heaven because he exceeded his time to stay on earth. Jobrael disobeyed, so Magbabaya get him arrested and locked up.

To punish Jobrael further, Magbabaya then made a curse on Jobrael's son that he will only be able to stay on earth for 7 years. Worried of the short period of time, Jobrael got his son quickly married.

Upon learning the curse, Jobrael son's wife insisted they have to make sacrifices for 7 years. On the first year, the wife instructed the villagers to place a cross facing east, and offer betel and lime. The following year, the locals made an altar decorated with leaves from a palm tree, with chicken blood, eggs, rice, pork and wine offerings. On the third year, the wife asked the villagers to make a new altar decorated with black and yellow cloth, and to cut wood and make carvings on it. The following year, the locals offered a jar with a bamboo stick on it. On the fifth year, the wife instructed the villagers to make wooden pillars. The following year, the locals went to the forest to collect bayug wood to be used as a mortar, and then placed under the house and covered with nipa leaves. On the seventh year, the wife instructed the villagers to collect wood from the forest to create a stage.

Having seen the sacrifices made by Jobrael son's wife and the villagers for 7 years, Magbabaya later on changed his mind. He let Jobrael's son stay on earth to be with his wife, until the time that they had children and grandchildren.

== Notable Personalities ==
Datu Agdina Bacong Andus from Sindangan is a well-known figure in the buklog ritual practice. His ability descended from his father, who was a timuay.

== UNESCO Recognition ==
Buklog was first nominated to UNESCO's Intangible Cultural Heritage List in 2015, but was only approved by UNESCO at the end of 2019. The decision was made at the 14th Intergovernmental Committee for the Safeguarding of the Intangible Cultural Heritage meeting held in Bogota, Colombia on 9–14 December 2015.

Since then, Buklog has become a world-recognized intangible cultural heritage of the Philippines. However, because this ritual is rarely practiced, Buklog is classified as a culture that needs urgent safeguarding.
