= Mount Imbing =

Mountain in the Philippines

- Location within Philippines

Highest point
- Elevation: 700 m (2,300 ft)
- Coordinates: 7°41′6″N 123°14′11″E (Note: Itarong ang posisyon base sa gitas-on data (DEM 3") gikan sa Viewfinder Panoramas. Ang bug-os nga algoritmo anaa dinhi.)

Geography
- Country: Philippines
- Province: Zamboanga del Sur
- Region: Zamboanga Peninsula
- Municipality: Lapuyan
- District: 2nd congressional

Mount Imbing is a mountain in the southern island of Mindanao in the Philippines. The majority of the mountain is located in the municipality of Lapuyan in the Province of Zamboanga del Sur in the Zamboanga Peninsula. Because it is located in the boundary area between two municipalities, part of its slope is located within San Miguel, Zamboanga del Sur. It is named after Thimuay Imbing, the most prominent ancestral leader of the Subanen people during the American colonial period. It is 800 km south of the Philippine capital of Manila and rises 720 meters abve sea level and about 436 meters from the surrounding terrain. (Note: Topographic prominence determined from DEM 3" data from Viewfinder Panoramas The full algorithm is available here.) Its foothills are about 5.9 kilometers wide. (Note: The largest extension of the contour to give topographic prominence.)

The land surrounding Mount Imbing is mostly hilly, except in the east. (Note: Calculated from the intersection of all height data (DEM 3") from Viewfinder Panoramas, within a 10 kilometer radius. The full algorithm is available here.) The highest point in the area has an altitude of 1,140 meters and is 12.7 km north of Mount Imbing. (Note: Calculated from height data (DEM 3") from Viewfinder Panoramas. The full algorithm can be found here.) The nearest large town is Lapuyan, 7.0 km southwest of Mount Imbing. Bays and lagoons are common in the area around Mount Imbing. (Note: Less than 20 kilometers away compared to the average density of the Earth, according to GeoNames.)

The area around Mount Imbing is almost covered with forest. There is about 90 people per square kilometer around Mount Imbing which is quite densely populated.

== Climate ==
The climate is moderate. The average temperature is 22 °C. The hottest month is February at 24 °C and the coldest is August at 10 °C. The average rainfall is 2,828 millimeters per year. The wettest month is July with 383 millimeters of rain and the driest is December with 115 millimeters.

Mount Imbing

Climate chart (precipitation, max. and min. temperature)
J	F	M	A	M	J	J	A	S	O	N	D
220 25 20	250 27 21	146 27 20	184 27 21	237 24 19	246 24 21	383 24 19	246 23 −3	268 24 19	299 26 21	234 26 21	115 24 19
- █ Average max. and min. temperatures in °C
- █ Precipitation totals in mm
Imperial conversion
J	F	M	A	M	J	J	A	S	O	N	D
8.7 77 68	9.8 81 70	5.7 81 68	7.2 81 70	9.3 75 66	9.7 75 70	15 75 66	9.7 73 27	11 75 66	12 79 70	9.2 79 70	4.5 75 66
- █ Average max. and min. temperatures in °F
- █ Precipitation totals in inches
