= Subanon =

Subanen (also spelled Subanon or Subanun) can refer to:

- Subanen language
- Subanen people
