= Precolonial barangay =

Complex sociopolitical units in precolonial Philippines

In early Philippine history, barangay is the term historically used by scholars to describe the complex sociopolitical units that were the dominant organizational pattern among the various peoples of the Philippine archipelago in the period immediately before the arrival of European colonizers. Academics refer to these settlements using the technical term "polity", but they are usually simply called "barangays".

Most barangays were independent villages consisting of thirty to a hundred households. Other barangays — most notably those in Maynila, Tondo, Panay, Pangasinan, Caboloan, Cebu, Bohol, Butuan, Cotabato, and Sulu — were large cosmopolitan polities.

The term originally referred to both a house on land and a boat on water, containing families, friends and dependents.

Anthropologist F. Landa Jocano defines this period of the barangay states' dominance — approximately the 14th to the 16th centuries — as the "Barangic Phase" of early Philippine history. The Barangic Phase of Philippine history can be noted for its highly mobile nature, with barangays transforming from being settlements and turning into fleets and vice versa, with the wood constantly re-purposed according to the situation.

Some scholars such as Damon Woods, however, have recently challenged the use of the term barangay to describe the Philippines' various indigenous polities, citing a lack of linguistic evidence and the fact that all of the primary references suggesting that use of the term can be traced to just a single source - Juan de Plascencia's 1589 report Las costumbres de los indios Tagalos de Filipinas. Instead, Woods argues that this use of the term barangay reflected what was merely an attempt by the Spanish to reconstructing pre-conquest Tagalog society.

The term has since been adapted as the name of the basic political unit of the Philippines. So historical barangays should not be confused with present-day Philippine barrios, which were officially renamed barangays by the Philippine Local Government Code of 1991 as a reference to historical barangays.

== Origins and etymology ==
Theories, as well as local oral traditions, say that the original "barangays" were coastal settlements formed as a result of the migration of Austronesian people, who came to the archipelago by boat from Taiwan initially, and stayed in the archipelago to create a thalassocratic and highly sea dependent civilization based on outrigger boats, catamarans and stilt houses. This became the mainstays of the Austronesian speaking populations through the expansion from Maritime Southeast Asia out into the Pacific.

Noting the mobile and maritime nature of Austronesian culture, these ancient barangays were coastal or riverine in nature. This was because most of the people relied on fishing for their supply of protein and livelihoods. They also travelled mostly by water up and down rivers, and along the coasts.

Trails always followed river systems, which were also a major source of water for bathing, washing, and drinking. Early chroniclers record that the name, also spelled balangay, originally referred to a plank boat widely used by various cultures of the Philippine archipelago prior to the arrival of European colonizers; in essence a barangay or balangay is a ship or a fleet of ships and its crew or crews, and also a house or a settlement.

== Description ==
Historically, the first barangays started as relatively small communities of around 30 to 100 families, with a population that varies from one hundred to five hundred persons. When the Spaniards came, they found communities with only twenty to thirty people, as well as large and prestigious principalities.

The coastal villages were more accessible to trade with foreigners. These were ideal places for economic activity to develop. Business with traders from other Countries also meant contact with other cultures and civilizations, such as those of Japan, Han Chinese, Indian people, and Arabs.

In time, these coastal communities acquired more advanced cultures, with developed social structures (sovereign principalities), ruled by established royalties and nobilities.

=== Smaller barangay settlements ===
The smallest barangays were communities of around 30 to 100 households, led by a Datu, or a leader with an equivalent title. This was the typical size of inland settlements by the time the Spanish colonizers arrived in the late 1500s, whereas larger, more cosmopolitan polities dominated the coasts, particularly river deltas.

=== Barangays as apex city states ===
When barangays grew larger, as was the case in Ma-i, Maynila, Tondo, Madja-as of Panay, Pangasinan, Caboloan, Cebu, Bohol, Butuan, Sanmalan, Cotabato, Sulu, and Lanao, among others, they took on a more complex social organization. Several barangays, consisting of households loyal to a datu, Rajah or Sultan banded together to form larger cosmopolitan polities as an apex city states. The rulers of these barangays would then select the most senior or most respected among them to serve as a paramount datu. These polities sometimes had other names (such as bayan in the Tagalog regions) but since the terminology varies from case to case, scholars such as Jocano and Scott simply refer to them as "larger" barangays.

Grace Odal-Devora traces the etymology of the term bayan to the word bahayan, meaning a "community", or literally "a place with many households (bahay)." The majority of these early "bayan" were economically complex communities situated river deltas where rivers exit out into the ocean, and featured a compact community layout which distinguished them from inland communities, thus the name.

Odal-Devors notes that bayan's root word, Ba-y or Ba-i, is linguistically related to other Philippine words for shoreline and perimeter (both baybay), woman (babai or the Visayan term ba-i "great lady"), friend (the Visayan term bay), and writing (baybayin). She also notes that these terms are the basis for many place-names in the Philippines, such as Bay, Laguna and Laguna de Bay, and Baybay.

The earliest documentation of the term "Bayan" was done by early Spanish missionaries who came up with local language dictionaries to facilitate the conversion of the peoples of the Philippine archipelago to Roman Catholicism. Among the most significant of these dictionaries was the Vocabulario de la lengua tagala by the Augustinian missionary Fray Pedro de San Buenaventura, who described it as a large town with four to ten datu lived with their followers, called dulohan or barangay.

After the various polities of the Philippine archipelago were united into a single political entity during colonial times, the term gradually lost its original specific meaning, and took on more generic, descriptive denotations: population center (poblacion) or capital (cabisera); municipality; or in the broadest sense, "country". (Note: Another word, bansa or bangsa, is translated "nation".) Among the most prominent of these bayan entities were those in Maynila, Tondo, Pangasinan, Caboloan, Cebu, Bohol, Butuan, Cotabato, and Sulu.

Although popular portrayals and early nationalist historical texts sometimes depict Philippine paramount rulers as having broad sovereign powers and holding vast territories, critical historiographers such as Jocano, Scott, and Junker explain that historical sources clearly show paramount leaders exercised only a limited degree of influence, which did not include claims over the barangays and territories of less-senior datus. For example, F. Landa Jocano, in his seminal work Filipino Prehistory: Rediscovering Precolonial Heritage, notes:

Even if different Barangays entered into alliances with one another, there was no sovereign datu over them. Each datu ruled his barangay independently. The alliances were limited to mutual protection and assistance in times of need. It did not entail permanent allegiance. The grouping was based on consensus. Whoever was chosen by the groups as their leader exercised leadership and asserted authority over them. It was a living democracy...Barangay alliances were loosely defined. These were often based on kinship and marriage. Each Barangay remained independent and enjoyed freedom from external control. That was why Lapulapu resisted the attempt of Magellan to make him acknowledge the lordship of Humabon. The same was true of the other datus who resisted coercive efforts of the Spaniards to make them subservient to other Datus.

Keifer compares this situation to similarly-structured African polities where "component units of the political structure consist of functionally and structurally equivalent segments integrated only loosely by a centralized authority dependent on the consensual delegation of power upwards (sic) through the system." Junker, expounding further on Keifer's work, notes:

While political leadership followed an explicitly symbolized hierarchy (sic) of rank [...] this leadership hierarchy (sic) did not (sic) constitute an institutionalized chain of command from center to periphery. Political allegiance was given only to the leader immediately above an individual with whom a kin group had personal ties of economic reciprocity and loyalty.

This explanation of the limited powers of a paramount leader in cultures throughout the Philippine archipelago explains the confusion experienced by Martin de Goiti during the first Spanish forays into Bulacan and Pampanga in late 1571. Until that point, Spanish chroniclers continued to use the terms "king" and "kingdom" to describe the polities of Tondo and Maynila, but Goiti was surprised when Lakandula explained there was "no single king over these lands", and that the leadership of Tondo and Maynila over the Kapampangan polities did not include either territorial claim or absolute command. Antonio de Morga, in his work Sucesos de las Islas Filipinas, expounds:

There were no kings or lords throughout these islands who ruled over them as in the manner of our kingdoms and provinces; but in every island, and in each province of it, many chiefs were recognized by the natives themselves. Some were more powerful than others, and each one had his followers and subjects, by districts and families; and these obeyed and respected the chief. Some chiefs had friendship and communication with others, and at times wars and quarrels. These principalities and lordships were inherited in the male line and by succession of father and son and their descendants. If these were lacking, then their brothers and collateral relatives succeeded... When any of these chiefs was more courageous than others in war and upon other occasions, such a one enjoyed more followers and men; and the others were under his leadership, even if they were chiefs. These latter retained to themselves the lordship and particular government of their own following, which is called barangay among them. They had datos and other special leaders [mandadores] who attended to the interests of the barangay.

==== Titles of rulers ====
Because the peoples of the Philippine archipelago had different languages, the highest ranking political authorities in the largest historical barangay polities went by different titles. The titles of the paramount datu also changed from case to case, including: Sultan in the most Islamized areas of Mindanao; lakan among the Tagalogs; Thimuay Labi among the Subanen; rajah in polities which traded extensively with Indonesia and Malaysia; or simply Datu in some areas of Mindanao and the Visayas.

In communities which historically had strong political or trade connections with Indianized polities in Indonesia and Malaysia, the Paramount Ruler was called a rajah. Among the Subanon people of the Zamboanga Peninsula, a settlement's datus answer to a thimuay, and some thimuays are sometimes additionally referred to as thimuay labi, or as sulotan in more Islamized Subanon communities. In some other portions of the Visayas and Mindanao, there was no separate name for the most senior ruler, so the Paramount ruler was simply called a datu, although one datu was identifiable as the most senior.

==== Alliance groups among paramount rulers ====
Often, these paramount datus, rajahs and sultans formed ritual alliances with the leaders of nearby polities, and these "alliance groups" spread their political influence (but not their territorial claims) across an even larger geographic area. One prominent example was the case of the paramount rulers of Maynila and Tondo, who were said to have political sway among the peoples of Bulacan and Pampanga before the arrival of the Spanish.

== Social organization and stratification ==
The barangays in some coastal places in Panay, Manila, Cebu, Jolo, and Butuan, with cosmopolitan cultures and trade relations with other countries in Asia, were already established Principalities before the coming of the Spaniards. In these regions, even though the majority of these barangays were not large settlements, yet they had organized societies dominated by the same type of recognized aristocracy (with birthright claim to allegiance from followers), as those found in established principalities.

The aristocratic group in these pre-colonial societies was called the datu class. Its members were presumably the descendants of the first settlers on the land or, in the case of later arrivals, of those who were datus at the time of migration or conquest. Some of these principalities have remained, even until the present, in unhispanized and mostly Islamized parts of the Philippines, in Mindanao.

Social Hierarchy of Pre-colonial Polities
Class	Title	Description
Maginoo (ruling class)	Raja, Lakan	Paramount Leader of the confederacy of Barangay states. In a confederacy forged by alliances among polities, the datu would convene to choose a paramount chief from among themselves; their communal decision would be based on a datu's prowess in battle, leadership, and network of allegiances.
Maginoo (ruling class)	Datu	Datus were maginoo with personal followings (dulohan or barangay). His responsibilities include: governing his people, leading them in war, protecting them from enemies and settling disputes. He received agricultural produce and services from his people, and distributed irrigated land among his barangay with right of usufruct.
Maginoo (ruling class)	Maginoo	Maginoo comprised the ruling class of Tagalogs, Ginoo was both honorific for both men and women. Panginoon were maginoo with many slaves and other valuable property like houses and boats. Lineage was emphasized over wealth; the nouveau riche were derogatorily referred to as maygintawo (fellow with a lot of riches). Members included: those who could claim noble lineage, members of the datu's family.
Maginoo (ruling class)	Sultan	Powerful governor of a province within the caliphate or dynasties of Islamic regions. Their position was inherited by a direct descent in a royal bloodline who could claim the allegiances of the datu. Sultans took on foreign relations with other states, and could declare war or allow subordinate datus to declare war if need be. The sultan had his court, a prime minister (gugu), an heir to the throne (Rajah Muda or crown prince), a third-ranking dignitary (Rajah Laut, or sea lord) and advisers (pandita).
Timawa and Maharlika (middle class and freemen)	Timawa	Non-slaves who can attached themselves to the Datu of their choice. They could use and bequeath a portion of barangay land. In Luzon, their main responsibility to the datu was agricultural labor, but they could also work in fisheries, accompany expeditions, and rowboats. They could also perform irregular services, like support feasts or build houses. In Visayas, they paid no tribute and rendered no agricultural labor. They were seafaring warriors who bound themselves to a datu. Member included: illegitimate children of Maginoo and slaves and former alipin who paid off their debts.
Timawa and Maharlika (middle class and freemen)	Maharlika	Warrior class of the barangay, rendered military services to the Datu and paid for their own equipment and weapons. They also received a share of the spoils.
Alipin/Uripon (slaves)	Alipin Namamahay	Slaves who lived in their own houses apart from their creditor. If the alipin's debt came from insolvency or legal action, the alipin and his creditor agreed on a period of indenture and an equivalent monetary value in exchange for it. The alipin namamahay was allowed to farm a portion of barangay land, but he was required to provide a measure of threshed rice or a jar of rice wine for his master's feasts. He came whenever his master called to harvest crops, build houses, rowboats, or carry cargo. Member included: those who have inherited debts from namamahay parents, timawa who went into debt, and former alipin saguiguilid who married and were allowed to live outside of master's house.
Alipin/Uripon (slaves)	Alipin Saguiguilid	Slaves who lived in their creditor's house and were entirely dependent on him for food and shelter. Male alipin sagigilid who married were often raised to namamahay status, because it was more economical for his master (as opposed to supporting him and his new family under the same roof). However, female alipin sagigilid were rarely permitted to marry. Member included: children born in creditor's house and children of parents who were too poor to raise them.

Babaylan were highly respected members of the community, on par with the Maginoo. In the absence of the datu (head of the community), the Babaylan takes in the role of interim head of the community. Babaylans were powerful ritual specialists who were believed to have influence over the weather and tap various spirits in the natural and spiritual realms. Babaylans were held in such high regard as they were believed to possess powers that can block the dark magic of an evil datu or spirit and heal the sick or wounded. Among other powers of the babaylan were to ensure a safe pregnancy and child birth.

As a spiritual medium, babaylans also lead rituals with offerings to the various divinities or deities. As an expert in divine and herb lore, incantations, and concoctions of remedies, antidotes, and a variety of potions from various roots, leaves, and seeds, the babaylans were also regarded as allies of certain datus in subjugating an enemy, hence, the babaylans were also known for their specialization in medical and divine combat.

According to William Henry Scott a Katalonan could be of either sex, or male transvestites (bayoguin), but were usually women from prominent families who were wealthy in their own right. According to Luciano P. R. Santiago (To Love and to Suffer) as remuneration for their services they received a good part of the offerings of food, wine, clothing, and gold, the quality and quantity of which depended on the social status of the supplicant. Thus, the catalonas filled a very prestigious as well as lucrative role in society.

=== Variation in social stratification ===
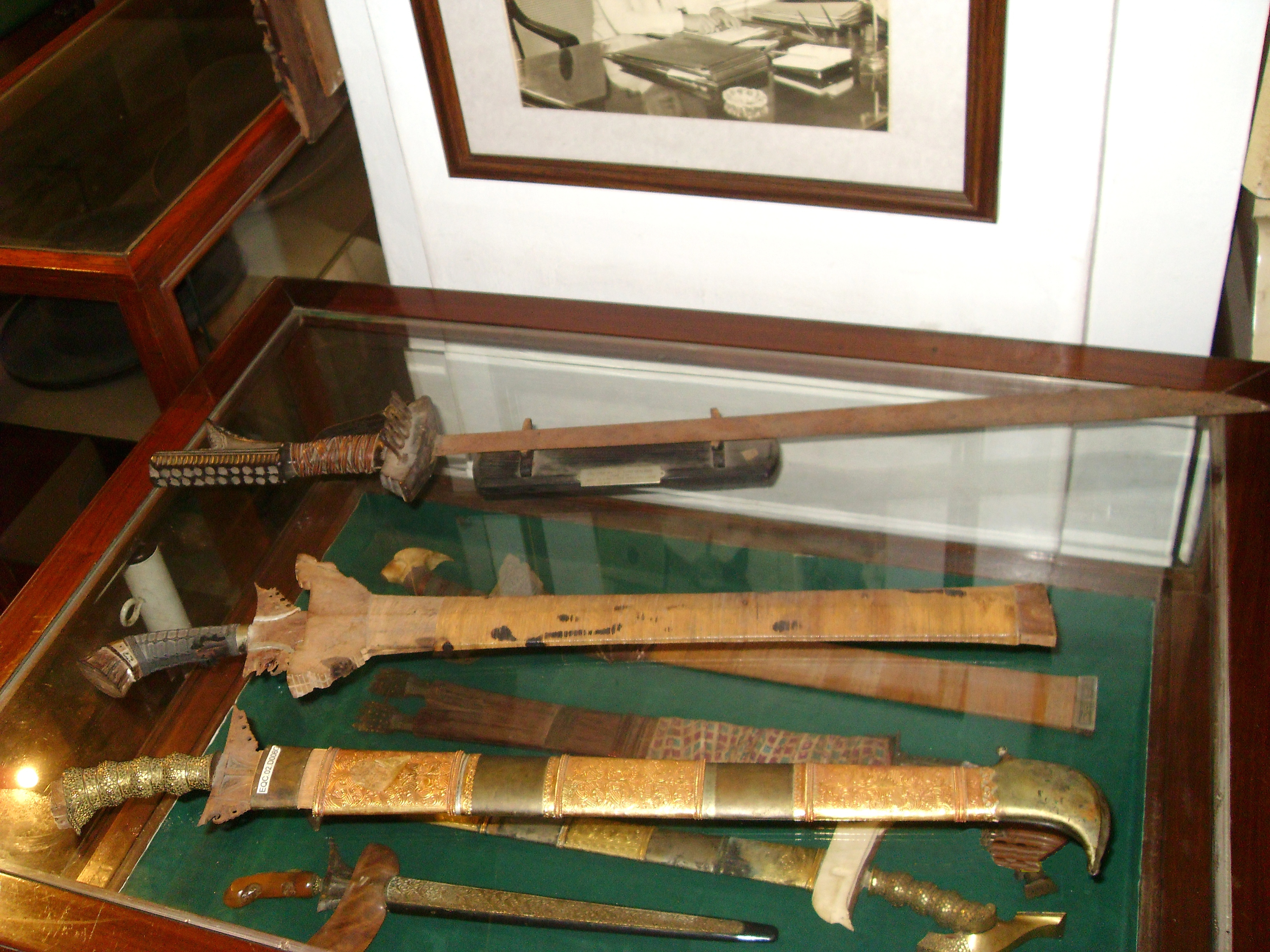
Kampilan – the common weapon of the pre-colonial warrior class.

Because of the difficulty of accessing and accurately interpreting the various available sources, relatively few integrative studies of pre-colonial social structures have been done – most studies focus on the specific context of a single settlement or ethnic group. There are only a handful of historiographers and anthropologists who have done integrative studies to examine the commonalities and differences between these polities. In the contemporary era of critical scholarly analysis, the more prominent such works include the studies of anthropologist F. Landa Jocano and historian-historiographer William Henry Scott. More recently, anthropologist Laura Lee Junker conducted an updated comparative review of the social organization of early polities throughout the archipelago, alongside her study of inter and intra-regional trade among Philippine coastal polities.

In the middle of the seventeenth century, the Jesuit missionary Francisco Colin made an attempt to give an approximate comparison of the social stratification in Tagalog culture with that in the Visayan culture. While social mobility was possible in the former, in the Visayas, the Datu (if had the personality and economic means) could retain and restrain competing peers, relatives, and offspring from moving up the social ladder.

The term Timawa came into use in the Tagalog social structure within just twenty years after the coming of the Spaniards. The term, however, was being applied to former Alipin (Third Class) who have escaped bondage by payment, favor, or flight. The Tagalog Timawas did not have the military prominence of the Visayan Timawa. The warrior class in the Tagalog society was present only in Laguna, and they were called the Maharlika Class. At the early part of the Spanish regime, the number of their members who were coming to rent land from their Datus was increasing.

Unlike the Visayan Datus, the Lakans and Apos of Luzon could call all non-Maginoo subjects to work in the Datu’s fields or do all sorts of other personal labor. In the Visayas, only the Oripuns were obliged to do that, and to pay tribute besides. The Tagalog who works in the Datu’s field did not pay him tribute, and could transfer their allegiance to another Datu.

The Visayan Timawa neither paid tribute nor performed agricultural labor. In this sense, they were truly aristocrats. The Tagalog Maharlika did not only work in his Datu’s field, but could also be required to pay his own rent. Thus, all non-Maginoo in Luzon formed a common economic class in some sense, though this class had no designation.

In other parts of the Archipelago, even though the majority of these barangays were not large settlements, yet they had organized societies dominated by the same type of recognized aristocracy and Lordships (with birthright claim to allegiance from followers), as those found in more established, richer and more developed Principalities.

==== Barangays in the Visayas ====
In more developed barangays in Visayas (e.g. Cebu, Bohol, and Panay) which were never conquered by Spain but were subjugated as vassals by means of pacts, peace treaties, and reciprocal alliances, the datu was at the top of the social order in a sakop or haop (elsewhere referred to as barangay).

This social order was divided into three classes. The members of the tumao class (which includes the datu) were the nobility of pure royal descent, compared by the Boxer Codex to the titled Spanish lords (señores de titulo). Below the tumao were the vassal warrior class known as the timawa, characterized by the Jesuit priest Francisco Ignatio Alcina as "the third rank of nobility" and by the conquistador Miguel de Loarca as "free men, neither chiefs nor slaves". These were people of lower nobility who were required to render military service to the datu in hunts, land wars (Mangubat or Managayau), or sea raids (Mangahat or Magahat).

Aside from this, the timawa also paid taxes and tribute (buwis or handug) and were sometimes called upon for agricultural labor to the datu, though the personal vassals of the datu may be exempt from such obligations (the latter were characterized by the Boxer Codex as "knights and hidalgos). Below the timawa were the oripun class (commoners and slaves), who rendered services to the tumao and timawa for debts or favors.

To maintain purity of bloodline, the tumao usually marry only among their kind, often seeking high ranking brides in other barangay, abducting them, or contracting brideprices in gold, slaves and jewelry. Meanwhile, the datu keep their marriageable daughters secluded for protection and prestige. These well-guarded and protected highborn women were called binokot (literally "veiled" or "swaddled"), and the datu of pure descent (at least for four generations) were called potli nga datu or lubus nga datu.

==== Barangays in the Tagalog Region ====
The different type of culture prevalent in Luzon gave a less stable and more complex social structure to the pre-colonial Tagalog barangays of Manila, Pampanga and Laguna. Taking part in a more extensive commerce than those in Visayas, having the influence of Bornean political contacts, and engaging in farming wet rice for a living, the Tagalogs were described by the Spanish Augustinian friar Martin de Rada as more traders than warriors, and possessed distinct religious practices concerning anitos and dambanas.

The more complex social structure of the Tagalogs was less stable during the arrival of the Spaniards because it was still in a process of differentiating. A Jesuit priest Francisco Colin made an attempt to give an approximate comparison of it with the Visayan social structure in the middle of the 17th century. The term datu or lakan, or apo refers to the chief, but the noble class to which the datu belonged to was known as the maginoo class. Any male member of the maginoo class can become a datu by personal achievement.

The term timawa referring to freemen came into use in the social structure of the Tagalogs within just twenty years after the coming of the Spaniards. The term, however, was being incorrectly applied to former alipin (commoner and slave class) who have escaped bondage by payment, favor, or flight. Moreover, the Tagalog timawa did not have the military prominence of the Visayan timawa. The equivalent warrior class in the Tagalog society was present only in Laguna, and they were known as the maharlika class.

At the bottom of the social hierarchy are the members of the alipin class. There are two main subclasses of the alipin class. The aliping namamahay who owned their own houses and served their masters by paying tribute or working on their fields were the commoners and serfs, while the aliping sa gigilid who lived in their masters' houses were the servants and slaves.

== Hispanization ==
Upon the arrival of the Spanish, smaller ancient barangays were combined to form towns in a resettlement process known as Reducción. The policy coerced inhabitants of several far-flung and scattered barangays to move into a centralized cabecera (town) where a newly built church was situated. This allowed the Spanish government to control the movement of the indigenous population, to easily facilitate Christianization, to conduct population counts, and to collect tributes. Every barangay within a town was headed by the cabeza de barangay (barangay chief), who formed part of the Principalía - the elite ruling class of the municipalities of the Spanish Philippines. This position was inherited from the datu, and came to be known as such during the Spanish regime. The Spanish Monarch ruled each barangay through the cabeza, who also collected taxes (called tribute) from the residents for the Spanish Crown.

== Difference from the modern barangay ==
The word barangay in modern use refers to the smallest administrative division in the Philippines, also known by its former Spanish adopted name, the barrio. This modern context for the use of the term barangay was adopted during the administration of President Ferdinand Marcos when he ordered the replacement of the old barrios and municipal councils. This act was eventually codified under the 1991 Local Government Code.

There are a number of distinctions between the modern Barangay or Barrio, and the city-states and independent principalities encountered by the Spanish when they first arrived in 1521 and established relatively permanent settlements beginning in 1565. The most glaring difference would be that the modern entity represents a geographical entity, the pre-colonial barangays represented loyalty to a particular head (datu).

Even during the early days of Spanish rule, it was not unusual for people living beside each other to actually belong to different barangays. They owed their loyalty to different datus. Also, while the modern barangay represents only the smallest administrative unit of government, the barangay of precolonial times was either independent, or belonged to what was only a loose confederation of several barangays, over which the rulers picked among themselves who would be foremost - known as the Pangulo or Rajah.

In most cases, his function was to make decisions which would involve multiple barangays, such as disputes between members of two different barangays. Internally, each datu retained his jurisdiction.

== Related concepts ==
=== Feudalism ===
The organization of pre-colonial Philippine states has often been described as or compared to feudalism (see non-Western feudalism), particularly in light of Marxist socioeconomic analysis. Specifically, political scientists note that political patterns of the modern Republic of the Philippines, supposedly a liberal democracy, can more accurately be described using the term "Cacique Democracy"

==== Cacique democracy ====
Present-day political scientists studying the Philippines have noted that the reciprocal social obligations that characterized the pre-colonial bayan and barangay system are still in place today, albeit using the external trappings of modern liberal democracy. The term "cacique democracy" has been used to describe the feudal political system of the Philippines where in many parts of the country local leaders remain very strong, with almost warlord-type powers.

The term was originally coined by Benedict Anderson from the Taíno word Cacique and its modern derivative "caciquismo" (sometimes translated as "Bossism"), which refers to a political boss or leader who exercises significant power in a political system.

==== Mandala ====
In the late 20th century, European historians who believed that historical Southeast Asian polities did not conform to classical Chinese or European views of political geography began adapting the Sanskrit word "Mandala" ("circle") as a model for describing the patterns of diffuse political power distributed among Mueang or Kedatuan (principalities) in early Southeast Asian history. They emphasized that these polities were defined by their centre rather than their boundaries, and it could be composed of numerous other tributary polities without undergoing administrative integration.

This model has been applied to the historical polities of Malaysia, Brunei, and Indonesia which traded extensively with various Bayan polities in the Philippines. However, Southeast Asian historians such as Jocano, Scott, and Osbourne are careful to note that the Philippines and Vietnam were outside of the geographical scope of direct Indian influence, and that the Philippines instead received an indirect Indian cultural influence through their relations with the Majapahit empire.

Philippine historiographers thus do not apply the term "Mandala" to describe early Philippine polities because doing so overemphasizes the scale of Indian influence on Philippine culture, obscuring the indigenous Austronesian cultural connections to the peoples of Micronesia, Melanesia, and Polynesia.

== See also ==
- Kedatuan, another term for the system of independent and semi-independent city-states in Maritime Southeast Asia
- Mueang, similar concept in mainland Southeast Asia, especially in Thailand and Laos
- Mandala, political model in ancient Southeast Asia
- Christianization
- Indian cultural influences in early Philippine polities
- Paramount rulers in early Philippine history
- Lakan
- Thimuay
- Datu
- Maynila
- Tondo
- Balangay
