= Canatuan mine =

Open-pit mine in Mindanao, Philippines

Coordinates: 7.7332°N 122.2800°E

The Canatuan mine was a gold/silver, copper/zinc open-pit mine located in the province of Zamboanga del Norte on the southern island of Mindanao, Philippines. The mine was operated from 2004 to January 2014 by TVI Resource Development (Phils) Inc., a former subsidiary of Canadian-based TVI Pacific Inc. The mine was operated within Mount Canatuan, a sacred mountain of the Subanen people, who protested against the mining company and its operations.

The mine' s ore was depleted in 2014.

== Mining history ==
Gold panning activity in the Canatuan Creek area was first recorded in the mid 1980s. The substantial quantities of gold being recovered prompted prospecting efforts to find the bedrock source of the gold. In 1990 prospectors discovered an extensive field of gold-bearing boulders and the first test pit was sunk that year.

Reports of the discovery drew experienced artisanal and small scale miners (SSM's) from elsewhere in the Philippines, as well as local people to form several small co-operatives. By 1994, the area was being worked by nearly 1,500 small scale miners.

In 1994 TVI Pacific reached an option agreement with the initial prospectors and continued extensive exploration. The agreement allowed TVI to explore the area and to purchase the Mineral Production Sharing Agreement (MPSA) that had been applied for in 1992, and which was still making its way through the government approval process (and subsequently approved in 1996).

In 1995 a pre-feasibility study was carried out, and in 1996 a two feasibility studies were completed (each examining a different approach to the potential mining operation). These studies did not proceed to any project implementation.

In 2003 a new feasibility assessment was carried out, which recommended further infill drilling to better define the deposit, and this drilling was carried out in 2004. Two more feasibility studies were carried out in 2004 and 2006 – the first examined mining only the gold and silver bearing oxidized portion of the deposit, the second examined mining of the sulphides (copper, zinc, gold and silver) underlying the oxide portion of the deposit. In 2004 TVI began operations to mine the oxide layer.

In April 2006 TVI requested Geostat Systems International Inc (Geostat) to produce a 43-101 Technical Report (publicly available on www.sedar.com). Another 43-101 Technical Report was completed in April 2008 by Pierre Jean Lafleur Géoconseil Inc (PJLGCI). These reports pertained to potential investments to start mining and processing the sulphide deposit.

In April 2008 operations to mine and recover gold and silver from the oxide layer were concluded, and the related ore processing facilities were being converted to process the sulphide deposit. Also in April, manpower was reduced by 168 personnel as part of the transition to the sulphide operation. The sulphide deposit mining and processing achieved commercial operations on March 1, 2009, producing copper concentrate, with the zinc recovery circuit expected to be fully operational by late April 2010.

In January 2010 TVI announced a joint venture with the Philippine-based company DACON (part of the DMCI Group of Companies) to carry out further mineral exploration in the Greater Canatuan Tenement.

== Operations and economic impact ==
Mining concession

The property comprises two Exploration Permit Application (EPA) areas totaling 32,400 hectares and three claim blocks totaling approximately 4,755 hectares. The main claim block within which the reserves have been delineated covers an area of approximately 508 hectares. The basis of the 508 hectare mining concession is the Mineral Production Sharing Agreement (MPSA No. 054-96-IX) under the authority of the Philippine Government, registered in the name of TVIRD. The MPSA has a term of 25 years (starting from 1996), renewable for another period, and grants the contractor the "exclusive right to explore, develop, and utilize for commercial purposes gold, silver, copper, zinc and other minerals existing within the contract area.

Gossan phase gold and silver operation (now closed)

From 2004 to 2008 TVIRD operated an open pit mine, milling and processing operation producing gold and silver doré from the Gossan ore deposit. Over that period the operation produced in the order of 100,000 oz of gold (Au) and 1,700 oz of silver (Ag). The mill process consisted of crushing, milling and processing of mined ore. A hybrid process consisting of a Merrill-Crowe and Carbon in Leach circuit was used for the recovery of gold and silver.

Sulphide phase copper and zinc operation

In 2008, as the mining operation moved into an ore zone with different composition, the gold/silver doré operation was decommissioned and the operation converted to copper and zinc concentrates. The Sulphide Phase operation will use the same front end crushing and grinding process from the Gossan operation and will use a Flotation Circuit for the recovery of copper and zinc concentrates. The first shipment of copper concentrate was in March 2009 and completion of the zinc circuit is expected in April 2010.

Mining of the Sulphide ore deposit will be the same as surface mining method used during the Gossan Phase. The overall surface mine area will encompass approximately 26 ha. This includes portions of the Gossan Surface Mine which is outside the boundaries of the Sulphide ore reserve and the Sulphide ore reserve underlying the Gossan surface mine. Mining of the Sulphide ore will require excavation depths ranging from less than 1 m to approximately 60 m. Production capacity is 1,850 tonnes per day of ore, with a request to increase this to 2,500 tonnes per day. Total material moved has averaged 3,800 tonnes per day and will peak at 6,700 tonnes per day in 2012 (based on the current mining plan to 2013). The operating fleet of the mine (including both TVIRD and contractor owned) includes 54 haul trucks, 9 excavators, six bulldozers, and four loaders.

Economic impact

The company's operations have had a huge economic impact both for the Subanons and for the Philippine economy at large:

- As of January 2010, TVIRD has nearly 900 employees in operations and exploration activities, some 31 percent of whom are Subanons. The salaries and benefits these employees receive are the highest in the Zamboanga Peninsula. At Canatuan, they acquire skills that support lifelong employability. This number includes of the Special CAFGU (Citizens Armed Forces Geographical Unit) Active Auxiliary or SCAA, which are under the direct control of the Armed Forces of the Philippines. Most members of the SCAA are Subanon.
- TVIRD has been a continuing taxpayer to the national government. With the exception of 2008, when TVIRD decommissioned its Gossan Phase gold and silver operations, the company's tax payments have been increasing each year.
- TVIRD has consistently been Siocon's top taxpayer and employer.

Also a direct beneficiary are TVIRD's Subanon hosts, who have been receiving royalty payments from the company equivalent to one percent of gross sales.

== Environmental management ==
=== Water ===
The principal control activities related to the current operation are those of water management (runoff and process water), and water monitoring tailings management (permanent containment of the non-mineral material that is physically separated from the ore in the process plant). In 2009, five sediment ponds were maintained within the MPSA. These ponds serve as control strategies to mitigate the impacts of soil erosion and sediment conveyed by surface water runoff to Canatuan Creek and Lumot Creek. This does not include the Sulphide Tailings Impoundment which serves as a large sediment pond to control sediment materials within the Canatuan Creek watershed that are not captured by the smaller sediment ponds. A neutralization pond was also constructed in series with a sediment pond currently maintained downstream of the Nursery Area, which serves as a treatment pond during instances when acid mine drainage is observed. These series of ponds drain run off water from the Phase II Mine Area where acid mine drainage is anticipated to occur. Water quality data is collected at 14 locations on streams and rivers in and around the project area.

=== Rehabilitation ===
As with most mining operations, rehabilitation activities are carried out progressively – with activities carried out each year to rehabilitate areas no longer active. These rehabilitation activities include rehabilitation of the small-scale mining areas operated by others prior to the opening of the TVIRD mine.

As of the end of the Year 2009, approximately 39,300 trees were planted within and outside the MPSA. This is 11,000 tree seedlings short of the 55,00 targeted for 2009. In addition to the trees planted, various grasses and shrubs were also planted. Some of the species of trees planted include income-generating species such as rubber trees and mahogany.

The Gossan Dam and Impoundment plus the Upper and Lower Tailings Dam Impoundments are no longer used for tailings disposal. Progressive Rehabilitation activities were initiated during the second half of Year 2008 include addition of soil cover material on top of the tailings at the Lower Tailings Dam while waiting for further tailings consolidation. In Year 2010, topsoil cover will be placed on the tailings surface in preparation for planting. Current progressive rehabilitation also includes closure of an overburden stockpile by establishing erosion control, coverage with non-acid drainage (NAG) material, and revegetation; and rehabilitation of parts of the Phase 1 mining area through erosion control, soil conditioning and revegetation.

TVIRD's annual activities include progressive rehabilitation with the primary focus on slope stabilization and erosion control, revegetation and reforestation activities including soil conditioning and sediment control.

Total spending by TVIRD in 2009 on the environmental program was 71,599,512 Php ( approximately US$1.5 million).

In 2013, TVIRD signed an agreement with the US company Mars to turn 1,600 hectares of mined land into cacao plantations within three years.

=== Local environmental concerns ===
One of the principal concerns raised regarding impacts of the mining activities has been complaints from local fishermen about increased sediment in local rivers affecting fish spawning. However, there have been other activities in the area that could also contribute to sediment, and there has not been a clear link established between sediment levels and fish stocks in the area. Both forestry operations and the earlier artisanal mining both removed ground cover and likely increased sediment content in rivers.

Some areas of the land were used as dump sites filled with toxic waste from the mining activity.

== Relationship with local communities ==
=== Subanon ===
The principal community is the local indigenous people, known as the Subanon, who consider Mount Canatuan a sacred mountain: "Mount Canatuan is sacred to us. All of us married Subanens hold rituals here as a sign that we live here and we belong to the tribe of Apo Manglang." The Apu Manglang sub-tribe inhabits the area around the Canatuan mine, and are represented in the ancestral domain claim.

The MPSA held by TVI requires payment of a royalty of 1% of the market value of the minerals produced to the indigenous people who had a valid ancestral domain claim. TVI agreed to pay the royalty to the Siocon Subanon Association Inc. One source of disagreement regarding the mining activity is that the Certificate of Ancestral Domain Claim for the Subanon with respect to the mining area was issued after the MPSA was issued to TVI.

Within the Subanon community there is both support for and opposition to the mine. The relationship between the mining activity and the Subanon community is complicated by the fact that the Siocon Subanon Association Inc. is not a traditional Subanon political structure, and its leader is not of a lineage that would traditionally be allowed a leadership position in the community, and therefore there is dispute over the ability of the Association to make agreements. Similarly, TVI's agreement gives status to a Council of Elders, initially formed in 2002 at the instigation of the National Commission on Indigenous Peoples, but whose legitimacy is rejected by the traditional leadership group of the Subanon, the Gukom. The Gukom is not a permanent body, but is a gathering of the leaders of local territories.

An additional complication is that the Certificate of Ancestral Domain Claim was awarded a named group of Subanon individuals, not to a representative organization. The 2007 Rights & Democracy report states that, subsequent to the agreements, The Commission on Human Rights of the Philippines investigated the matter of consent and concluded that the company had not obtained true prior consent from the indigenous people for the mine (the source referenced for this statement is unpublished and has not been confirmed).

=== Artisanal mining community ===
A second community in the mining area is that of small scale and artisanal miners. As of 2007, eight thousand small scale miners had started activity in the area and worked without official permits. Although some of these miners are Subanon, many of them are not and only arrived in the area since the 1990s when the mineral deposit was discovered. Canatuan became the haven for migrant small-scale miners who armed themselves to maintain control over their interests. As the SSM community flourished, Subanon control of Canatuan diminished. Once established, these miners also became concerned that TVI activities could force them out of the area.

The introduction of Small Scale Mining (SSM) also introduced the Subanons to the cash economy. Migrants operated SSM in the area, which displaced the Subanons. Many Subanons worked for the SSM operators (typically for low wages with very poor working conditions); some of them became small SSM operators themselves. A few of the formal and informal leaders of the tribe greatly benefited from the SSM as the migrant mine operators ingratiated themselves to the leaders.

=== Relocation of residents ===
When TVIRD started to operate in Canatuan, the company implemented a “settlement program” for those who were to be affected by the company's activities for reasons of safety or displacement due to mining activities. This program had to address three different groups of residents: Subanon from the Apu Manglang sub-tribe local to the Canatuan mining area (local IP's/owners of the ancestral lands); Subanon originally from tribes distant from the Canatuan mining area (migrant IP's), and non-Subanon that migrated to the area for the SSM activity (non-IP migrants).

The settlement program involved a compensation package for migrants both indigenous and non-indigenous. The Subanon (indigenous) leadership was not amenable to a relocation program within the ancestral domain for the migrants. The compensation package – 8 to 12 times higher than those prescribed by the provincial ordinance governing real properties – was meant to provide the families a good opportunity to earn a decent and lawful living and have a fresh start outside Canatuan. The settlement program for SSM IPs who are considered owners of the ancestral domain was of two types. Some of them opted for a smaller multiplier but with a housing package, while others chose to be paid an amount similar to those received by migrant SSMs.

=== Human rights impacts ===
In the early years of TVIRD in Canatuan, the company had to contend with various layers of conflicts. Large-scale mining, after many years of practically being dormant, was being “reintroduced” by the Philippine government and being put forward as an industry that can be an engine of economic growth. This reintroduction created friction between large-scale mining companies and SSM interests. The Indigenous Peoples Rights Act (IPRA) that finally recognized that IPs have the right over their ancestral domains was still new then, and vested interest groups were being affected. The IPs had to familiarize themselves with their “new found” rights under IPRA. Meanwhile, local government units were fighting with the national government over the sharing of benefits over the latter's minerals development program. Communities then were not as familiar as they are now with large-scale mining operations. Consequently, civil society organizations and church groups took it upon themselves to raise emerging issues generated by the evolving, often confusing, milieu.

One source of controversy is the view held by some that the Subanon of the southern peninsula consider Mount Canatuan to be a sacred place. The peak of Mount Canatuan, according to some of the Subanon was not for occupation, flamboyant use, or architectural manifestations. However, there are different views within community regarding the accuracy and interpretation of this designation.

In May 2007, Rights & Democracy (R&D) issued a report titled “Mining a Sacred Mountain: Protecting the human rights of indigenous communities Environmental Management” which was critical of a number of aspects of the impact of the mine and actions of TVI, but also noting a history of conflict between groups in the area that preceded the TVI's presence in the region. The principal findings of the report were that the TVI operation created some jobs in an impoverished area and generated revenues for the indebted national government. However, that it also displaced many families; divided the local indigenous people; deprived thousands of small-scale miners of their livelihood; negatively affected rice farmers and fishers living downstream; and that it is located on the peak of Mount Canatuan, which the Subanon living in the area consider to be sacred. The report made recommendations for action both by the Philippine Government and TVI - including that the mining operation be halted until an independent monitoring procedure is in place.

TVI expressed disappointment with the report, noting that the 3rd parties engaged by R&D to carry out the research and report writing were well known opponents of mining in the Philippines. TVI objected that the report provides no information on the positive benefits of the mining operation, and that “We expect it is more than simple coincidence that the conclusions and recommendations set out in the Philippines Case Study coincide with positions advocated by members of the "research team" over the past decade". TVI offered clarifying information in a separate document detailing specific biases and inaccuracies in the R&D report.

An alternate view of the situation of the local population was also painted in a 2005 letter from TIMUAY JUANITO TUMANGKIS, President of the Siocon Subano Association Inc. and Chairman of the 30 member Council of Elders of the Subanons of Siocon, Zamboanga del Norte. Among others, the six page "open" letter is addressed to Christian Aid, MiningWatch Canada, the DIOPIM Committee on Mining Issues (DCMI), Tebtebba, KAIROS, Survival International, "LRC-KSK" (the Legal Rights and Natural Resources Kasama sa Kilikasan/Friends of the Earth Philippines). In the letter he states the case that:

- The Subanons desire "the development of their ancestral domain, employment and freedom from poverty, ..."
- They are working in a partnership with TVI, with specific conditions that have been agreed to by TVI, and that there right to Free Prior Informed Consent (FPIC) has not been violated.
- The TVI MPSA area does not embrace any of the sacred places claimed by the Subanon
- The artisanal mining activities caused pollution, employed child labour, and were often not Subanon - and they do not want to go back to the days of the artisanal mining operations
- Many of those who speak out against the TVI operation are not Subanon, and at least some have commercial interests in the artisanal mining activities that were not properly permitted and did not receive "Free and Prior Informed Consent" from the Subanon community
- In essence, the wrong involvement by external NGO's inhibits the local Subanon's right to self-government.
