= Mount Canatuan =

Mountain in the Philippines

- Location within Mindanao mainland Location within Philippines

Highest point
- Listing: Mountains of the Philippines
- Coordinates: 7°44′00″N 122°16′48″E

Geography
- Country: Philippines
- Province: Zamboanga del Norte
- Region: Zamboanga Peninsula

Mount Canatuan is a mountain in the province of Zamboanga del Norte on the island of Mindanao in the Philippines.

The mountain is sacred to the Subanen people. The Canatuan mine operated within the mountain from 2004 to 2014.
