= TVI Pacific =

Canadian mining company

- Formerly: TVI Copper Inc.
- Company type: Public company
- Traded as: TSX-V: TVI
- Industry: Mining
- Founded: 1987; 38 years ago
- Headquarters: Calgary, Canada
- Area served: Worldwide
- Products: Mining gold, silver and copper
- Website: tvipacific.com

TVI Pacific (TVI) is a Canadian mining company headquartered in Calgary. TVI's Canatuan mines were the first foreign-invested mine in the Philippines after the passage of the Philippine Mining Act of 1995. The company operates in Canada, the Philippines, Australia, Anguilla, Fiji, and China.

== History ==
The company was founded in 1987 as TVI Copper and changed its name to TVI Pacific Inc. in July 1994.

From 2004 to 2014, TVI produced 105,200 ounces (2,980,000 g) of gold, 1.8 million ounces (51,000,000 g) of silver, 199,778 tonnes (196,623 long tons; 220,218 short tons) of copper and 30,558 tonnes (30,075 long tons; 33,684 short tons) of zinc concentrate Revenues over the 10-year period totalled US$478 million.

TVI bought 30.66% of TVI Resource Development (Phils.) Inc. (TVIRD), a resource company established in 2014 that mines for nickel laterite ore, gold, and silver.

Another project was the Cirianiu gold project located in the Macuata Province of northern Vanua Levu Island of the Fijis.

In 2015 TVI was mentioned along with several other mining companies as being the likely beneficiary of a series of government-funded murders of the indigenous Lumads who live in the Mindanao region of the Philippines, an area rich in mineral resources to which these companies would like better access.

== See also ==
- Timuay Lucenio Manda
- Gold mining
