= Lucenio Manda =

Timuay Lucenio Manda is a Thimuay or ancestral leader of the indigenous Subanon people of the Zamboanga peninsula in the Philippines. He also serves as a government official, being the Barangay (village) captain of Barangay Conacon in the municipality of Bayog, Zamboanga del Sur. He is known as an opponent of illegal mining and logging operations in the Philippines.

Timuay Manda is well known for his attempts to protect his tribe’s ancestral domain and has been outspoken in his call for a moratorium on mining concessions in Bayog, a heavily forested region of the southwestern Philippines islands. Manda filed a court petition to revoke mining permits at the Pinukis Range Forest, which is among the last untouched forests in the Zamboanga peninsula of the islands where various multi-national mining companies are mining for gold and silver. His opposition to illegal mining operations in his area has led to the endangerment of his own life and also that of his immediate family. Manda has clarified that he is not altogether anti-mining, but rather anti-illegal mining, as there is a problem in the region of mining activities taking place without valid or legal documents.

On 4 September 2012, Manda was driving his 11-year-old son to elementary school in Barangay Datagan in Bayog on his motorcycle when they were ambushed by armed assailants. Seeing the gunman aiming at them both, he accelerated in an attempt to speed away, but they were fired upon and the vehicle crashed, with his son dying instantly. Manda, though wounded, survived the crash and the assailants, thinking him dead, fled the scene of the crime. Amnesty International is supporting Manda in his fight against those who targeted him and the head of Amnesty International in the Philippines, Aurora Parong, has called upon Philippine president Benigno Aquino III to bring perpetrators to justice and stop what the group says is a culture of impunity that has left 36 tribal activists dead over the last several years. Amnesty International have also noted that Manda’s family has been targeted before in the past, with his cousin fatally shot a decade ago.
