= Thimuay Imbing =

Timuay Imbing (sometimes referred to as "Timuay Beng Imbing" or "Timuay Labi Beng Imbing"; with the personal name sometimes spelled Mbeng) was the Timuay or ancestral leader of the Subanen people the Zamboanga peninsula in the Philippines during the American colonial Period. One of the most prominent Thimuay in Philippine history, he is perhaps best known for his role in introducing Evangelical Protestantism, through the Christian and Missionary Alliance Churches of the Philippines, to the Subanon people, and for establishing the settlement which would become the present-day municipality of Lapuyan, Zamboanga del Sur.

Thimuay Imbing is the ancestor of the royal Imbing clan of Lapuyan, although the title is now also sometimes used in the locality by various individuals who are not royal descendants. Thimuay Imbing is sometimes called "Timuay Labi" or "Highest Timuay" in deference to his achievements as leader of the Lapuyan Subanen.

A mountain, Mount Imbing on the boundary area between Lapuyan and San Miguel, Zamboanga del Sur, is named after Thimuay Imbing.

== See also ==
- Timuay
- Lapuyan, Zamboanga del Sur
- Subanen people
- Paramount rulers in early Philippine history - for an explanation of the rank "Thimuan Labi"
- Mount Imbing
- Evangelicalism in the Philippines
- Christian and Missionary Alliance Churches of the Philippines
