= Western Subanon language =

Austronesian language spoken on the Philippines

Western Subanon
- Siocon Subanon
- Native to: Philippines
- Region: Western Mindanao
- Native speakers: 300,000 (2018)
- Language family: Austronesian: Malayo-Polynesian; Philippine; Greater Central Philippine; Subanen; Western Subanon
- Dialects: Siocon; Western Kolibugan

Language codes
- ISO 639-3: suc
- Glottolog: west2811

Western Subanon (also known as Siocon Subanon or simply Subanon) is an Austronesian language belonging Subanen branch of the Greater Central Philippine subgroup. It is spoken by c. 300,000 people (as of 2018) in the southwestern part of the Zamboanga Peninsula region of Mindanao.

== Distribution and dialects ==
The Western Subanon speech area includes the villages Malayal, Lintangan, Lanuti, and Limpapa in the municipality of Sibuco, and parts of Siocon, Baliguian, Labason, Surabay, and Ipil, all located in the Zamboanga Peninsula region. The dialects are Siocon and Western Kolibugan (Western Kalibugan).

== Phonology ==
Western Subanon has 15 native consonants.

=== Consonants ===
Consonant phonemes
| | | Labial | Alveolar | Palatal | Velar | Glottal |
|---|---|---|---|---|---|---|
| Plosive | voiceless | p | t | | k | ʔ |
| Plosive | voiced | b | d | | ɡ | |
| Fricative | | | s | | | h |
| Nasal | | m | n | | ŋ | |
| Lateral | | | l | | | |
| Semivowel | | | | j | w | |

=== Vowels ===
Western Subanon has five vowels.

Monophthongs
| | Front | Central | Back |
|---|---|---|---|
| High | i | | u |
| Mid | e | | o |
| Low | | a | |

The diphthongs of Western Subanon are /au/, /ua/, /io/, /oi/, /ai/, and /ia/.

== Grammar ==
Western Subanon has a typical Philippine-type voice system. Unlike most other Philippine languages, it only has three voice categories.

Voice affixes
| | volitional | | non-volitional | |
| | realis | irrealis | realis | irrealis |
|---|---|---|---|---|
| Actor voice | ‹um›‹in› mig- | ‹um› mog- | miko- | moko- |
| Patient voice | ‹in› pig- | -on pog- | mi- | mo- |
| Goal voice | ‹in› -an pig- -an | -an pog- -an | ki- -an | ko- -an |

== Sample text ==
The chorus of the Western Subanon song "Momula ita" 'Let's plant' is shown.

Gumani ita
Gumani ita
Landu’ da’da’an ta
Po’ gumani ita
Gumani ita
Gumani ita
Di’ na mobon sinsaan ta
Gumani ita

We will harvest (or, Let's harvest)
We will harvest
Great is our rejoicing
Because we will harvest
We will harvest
We will harvest
Our suffering will not last long
We will harvest
