= Subanen languages =

Austronesian language spoken in the Philippines

Subanen
- Subanon
- Geographic distribution: Western Mindanao, Philippines
- Linguistic classification: Austronesian: Malayo-Polynesian; Philippine; Greater Central Philippine; Subanen
- Proto-language: Proto-Subanen
- Subdivisions: Central Subanen; Eastern Subanen; Northern Subanen; Southern Subanen; Kolibugan; Western Subanon

Language codes
- Glottolog: suba1253

The Subanen languages (also Subanon and Subanun) are a group of closely related Austronesian languages belonging to the Greater Central Philippine subgroup. Subanen languages are spoken in various areas of Zamboanga Peninsula, namely the provinces of Zamboanga Sibugay, Zamboanga del Norte and Zamboanga del Sur, and in Misamis Occidental of Northern Mindanao. There is also a sizeable Subanen community in Misamis Oriental and Lanao del Norte. Most speakers of Subanen languages go by the name of Subanen, Subanon or Subanun, while those who adhere to Islam refer to themselves as Kolibugan, Kalibugan, Tewlet or Telet.

== Internal classification ==
Jason Lobel (2013:308) classifies the Subanen varieties as follows.

- Subanen
  - Western
    - Western Subanon
    - Western Kolibugan
  - Nuclear
    - West Nuclear
      - Tawlet-Kalibugan Subanen
      - Salug-Godod Subanen
    - East Nuclear
      - Southern Subanen
      - Central Subanen
      - Northern Subanen
      - Eastern Subanen

Lobel (2013:308) lists the following innovations or retentions among each of the following subgroups.

- Nuclear Subanen: *k > Ø
- Western Subanen: *k > /k/ (retention)
- East Nuclear Subanen: *r > /l/
- West Nuclear Subanen: *r > /r/ (retention)
- Western Subanen: *r > /l/ (independently took place, likely due to contact with Tausug, Maguindanaon, Butuanon, Cebuano, and/or Ilonggo, which have also undergone the *r > /l/ shift independently of one another)

== Proto-Subanen ==
Proto-Subanen
- Reconstruction of: Subanen languages
- Reconstructed ancestors: Proto-Austronesian: Proto-Malayo-Polynesian; Proto-Philippine

The following phoneme inventory can be reconstructed for Proto-Subanen:

Vowels
	Front	Central	Back
Close	*i		*u
Mid		*ə	
Open		*a	

Consonants
		Bilabial	Alveolar	Palatal	Velar	Glottal
Stop	voiceless	*p	*t		*k	*ʔ
Stop	voiced	*b	*d		*g	
Fricative			*s			
Nasal		*m	*n		*ŋ	
Lateral			*l			
Approximant		*w		*y		

According to Jason Lobel (2013:304-305), the innovations defining Proto-Subanen from Proto-Greater Central Philippine are:

1. *h was lost in all positions in Proto-Subanen.

2. *ʔ was lost word-initially and word-medially, only being retained in word-final position.

3. Reduction of *a to *ə in prepenultimate syllables, as well as in closed penultimate syllables.

4. Addition of a word-initial *g- to all vowel-initlal words following the operation of the previous innovations.

5. Assimilation of consonant clusters into a sequence of either *kC, *gC, or a nasal cluster.
