= Thimuay =

Thimuay (also spelled thimuway, timuay, and thimuway, among other variations) is the name of the most senior ancestral leader among the Subanon people of the Zamboanga Peninsula in the Philippines. Less senior ancestral leaders are called "datu", just as they are elsewhere in the Philippines. Thimuay is equivalent to the titles "lakan", "sultan", or "rajah" in other Philippine cultures.

A greatly honored thimuay is sometimes additionally called a thimuay labi, with the word "labi" simply being a descriptor meaning "highest" or most senior. In predominantly Muslim Subanon communities, the term solotan is sometimes used instead of thimuay.

== Prominent thimuay ==
Perhaps the most prominent modern-day (20th century) thimuay was Thimuay Imbing (sometimes spelled Mbeng), who led the Subanon people from Lapuyan, Zamboanga del Sur during the Philippines' American colonial period. He is perhaps best known for his role in introducing Evangelical Protestantism (through the Christian and Missionary Alliance Churches of the Philippines) to the Subanon of Lapuyan.

Another prominent thimuay is Lucenio Manda, who defended the interests of his community in relation to the mining industry.

== See also ==
- Bagani
- Lumad
