= Lapuyan =

Municipality in Zamboanga del Sur, Philippines

- Municipality
- Municipality of Lapuyan
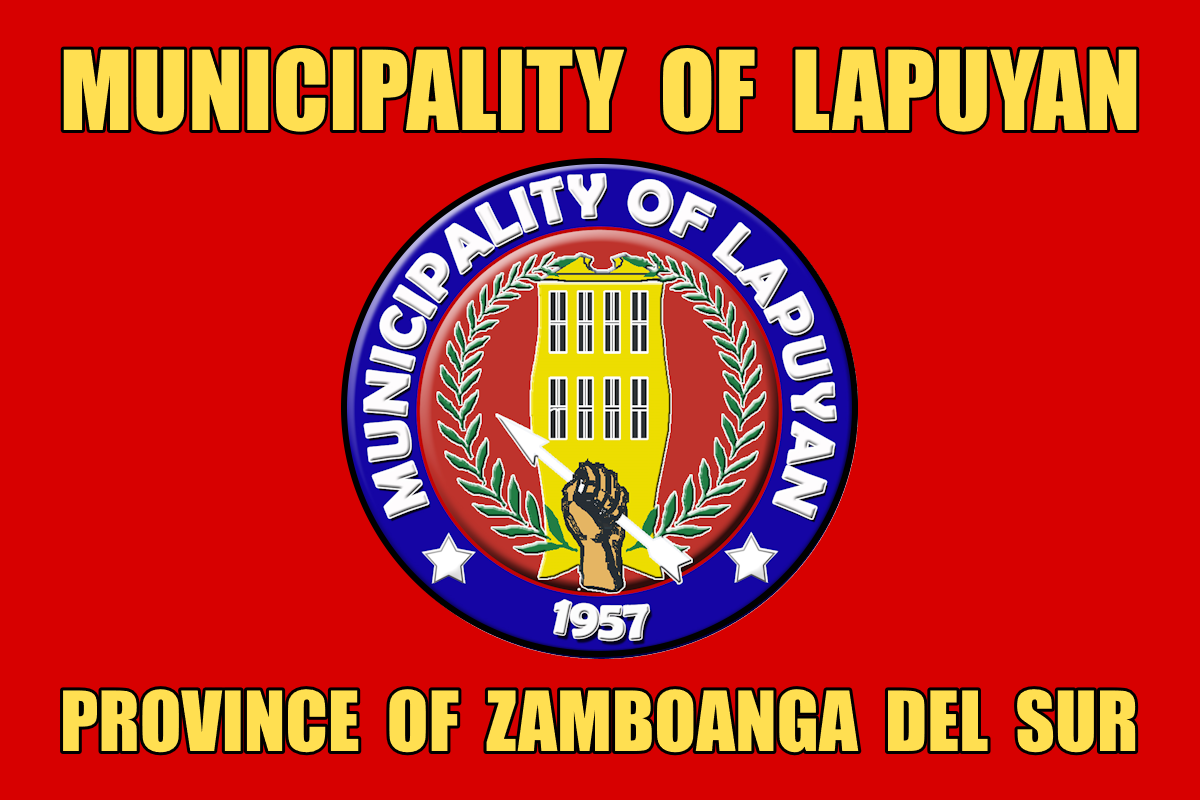
- Flag Seal
- Nicknames: Subanen Land; Culture-Friendly Municipality; Little America
- Motto: Dlepuyan sampay nawan
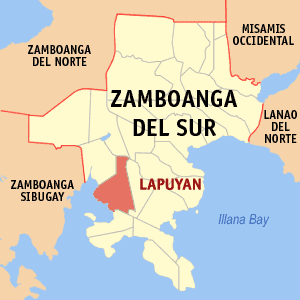
- Map of Zamboanga del Sur with Lapuyan highlighted
- Interactive map of Lapuyan
- Location within the Philippines
- Coordinates: 7°38′18″N 123°11′51″E
- Country: Philippines
- Region: Zamboanga Peninsula
- Province: Zamboanga del Sur
- District: 2nd district
- Founded: October 16, 1957
- Barangays: 26 (see Barangays)

Government
  - Type: Sangguniang Bayan
  - Mayor: Joel B. Sulong
  - Vice Mayor: Daylinda P. Sulong
  - Representative: Leonardo L. Babasa Jr.
  - Municipal Council: Members: Morvin G. Fernandez; Ricardo M. Duhaylungsod Sr.; Alejo D. Sigba Jr.; Abdulmajid M. Sheik; Reniel B. Huminis; Abner D. Lusay Jr.; Apolonio T. Cambed; Rowe B. Tan
  - Electorate: 17,071 voters (2025)

Area
  - Total: 329.00 km^{2} (127.03 sq mi)
- Elevation: 108 m (354 ft)
- Highest elevation: 459 m (1,506 ft)
- Lowest elevation: 0 m (0 ft)

Population (2024 census)
  - Total: 28,686
  - Density: 87.191/km^{2} (225.82/sq mi)
  - Households: 6,418

Economy
  - Income class: 2nd municipal income class
  - Poverty incidence: 46.44% (2023)
  - Revenue: ₱ 210.3 million (2024)
  - Assets: ₱ 691.3 million (2024)
  - Expenditure: ₱ 79.77 million (2024)
  - Liabilities: ₱ 209.4 million (2024)

Service provider
  - Electricity: Zamboanga del Sur 1 Electric Cooperative (ZAMSURECO 1)
- Time zone: UTC+8 (PST)
- ZIP code: 7037
- PSGC: 0907313000
- IDD : area code: +63 (0)62
- Native languages: Subanon; Cebuano; Chavacano; Tagalog; Maguindanaon
- Website: www.lapuyan.gov.ph

Lapuyan (Cebuano: Lungsod sa Lapuyan; Subanen: Benwa Dlepuyan; Maguindanaon: Inged nu Lapuyan, Jawi: ايڠد نو لڤوين; Chavacano: Municipalidad de Lapuyan; Tagalog: Bayan ng Lapuyan), is a municipality in the province of Zamboanga del Sur, Philippines. According to the 2024 census, it has a population of 28,686 people. The municipality of Lapuyan is located in the southern section of the Zamboanga del Sur province. It is also often referred to as "Little America".

== History ==
Lapuyan was created by separating the barrios of Lapuyan, Maruing, Kumalarang, Karpok, and Timbang, all of the municipality of Margosatubig and formed into a regular municipality by virtue of Executive Order No. 273 on October 16, 1957, by President Carlos P. Garcia upon the recommendation of Sen. Roseller T. Lim, Gov. Bienvenido Ebarle and the Provincial Board of Zamboanga del Sur. The municipality was formally inaugurated on April 21, 1958, with the induction into office of the following municipal officials: Mayor Coco I. Sia, Vice Mayor Bayang Guiaya, Councilors Dr. Vicente Imbing, Datu Manupak Dakula, Benigno Bualan, Javier Suico, Catalino Fernandez and Canuto Lingating. Through Presidential Proclamation 694, October 16, 2024 was declared a special non-working day in celebration of its 67th founding anniversary.

Upon creation into a regular municipality, the existing barrios within its jurisdiction were Poblacion, Kumalarang, Maruing, Carpok, Bulawan, Lakewood and Sayog.

== Geography ==
Lapuyan covers an area of 32,900 hectares (81,298 acres) of land, located on the northern shore of Dumanquilas Bay, bounded on the east by the municipality of San Miguel, on the west by Dumanquilas Bay and the municipalities of Malangas, Buug and Kumalarang, to the north by the municipalities of Lakewood and Tigbao, and on the south by Dumanquilas Bay and the municipality of Margosatubig, all in Zamboanga del Sur.

=== Climate ===
Climate data for Lapuyan, Zamboanga del Sur
Month	Jan	Feb	Mar	Apr	May	Jun	Jul	Aug	Sep	Oct	Nov	Dec	Year
Mean daily maximum °C (°F)	31 (88)	31 (88)	32 (90)	32 (90)	31 (88)	30 (86)	29 (84)	29 (84)	29 (84)	29 (84)	30 (86)	31 (88)	30 (87)
Mean daily minimum °C (°F)	21 (70)	21 (70)	22 (72)	23 (73)	24 (75)	24 (75)	24 (75)	24 (75)	24 (75)	24 (75)	23 (73)	22 (72)	23 (73)
Average precipitation mm (inches)	22 (0.9)	18 (0.7)	23 (0.9)	24 (0.9)	67 (2.6)	120 (4.7)	132 (5.2)	156 (6.1)	119 (4.7)	124 (4.9)	54 (2.1)	24 (0.9)	883 (34.6)
Average rainy days	9.4	9.1	11.5	11.9	20.1	22.5	22.4	23.2	21.5	22.2	15.7	11.5	201
Source: Meteoblue

=== Barangays ===
Lapuyan is politically subdivided into 26 barangays. Each barangay consists of puroks while some have sitios.

- Bulawan
- Danganan
- Dansal
- Dumara
- Karpok
- Lenok Madalum
- Luanan
- Lubosan
- Mahalingeb
- Mandeg
- Maralag
- Maruing
- Molum
- Pampang
- Pantad
- Pingalay
- Poblacion
- Salambuyan
- San Jose
- Sayog
- Tabon
- Talabob
- Tiguha
- Tininghalang
- Tipasan
- Tugaya

== Demographics ==
Population census of Lapuyan
Year	Pop.	±% p.a.
1960	13,594	—
1970	15,642	+1.41%
1975	16,845	+1.50%
1980	18,267	+1.63%
1990	20,861	+1.34%
1995	23,512	+2.27%
2000	24,366	+0.77%
2007	26,118	+0.96%
2010	26,175	+0.08%
2015	27,264	+0.78%
2020	27,737	+0.36%
2024	28,686	+0.81%
Source: Philippine Statistics Authority

=== Languages ===
Subanen, Cebuano, Maguindanaon, Chavacano, Tagalog/Filipino, English

== Economy ==
Poverty incidence of Lapuyan (%)

Source: Philippine Statistics Authority

== Government ==
Upon the municipality's inauguration on April 21, 1958, the first appointed mayor was Mayor Coco Imbing Sia (nephew of Datu Lumok Imbing) and the first appointed Vice Mayor was Bayang Guiaya. The first appointed municipal councilors were Dr. Vicente Imbing, Datu Maneped Dakula, Benigno Bualan, Javier Suico, Canuto Lingating, and Catalino Fernandez. The first appointed municipal officials served for two years from 1957 to 1959.

In the local elections of 1959, the first elected municipal officials were Mayor Coco I. Sia, Vice Mayor Fausto H. Imbing, Councilors Felicidad M. Minor, Dr. Vicente L. Imbing, and four others; they served from 1960 to 1963.

Below is a list of municipal officials who served as mayors and vice mayors of the municipality of Lapuyan.

- 1957–1959: Mayor Coco Imbing Sia with Vice Mayor Bayang Guiaya
- 1960–1963: Mayor Coco I. Sia with Vice Mayor Fausto H. Imbing
- 1964–1967: Mayor Mahalambas D. Huminis with Vice Mayor Consing Bugao
- 1968–1971: Mayor Coco Sia with Vice Mayor Jesusa Fernandez
- 1972–1975: Mayor Coco Sia with Vice Mayor Quensilan Sulong
- 1975–1979: Mayor Quensilan Sulong and Vice Mayor Catalino Bugao, martial law, KBL
- 1980–1986: Mayor Dr. Manasi Banghulot and Vice Mayor Lorenzo Sia (assassinated 1985, succeeded by Vice Mayor Miguel D. Villena)
- 1987–1988: Mayor Quensilan Sulong with Vice Mayor John Tan Manghay interim
- 1988–1991: Mayor Cesar Sulong with Vice Mayor Dr. Vicente Imbing
- 1992–1995: Mayor Cesar Sulong with Vice Mayor Romeo Tan (died 1993, succeeded by Vice Mayor Roland H. Lusay)
- 1995–1998: Mayor Cesar Sulong with Vice Mayor Roland Lusay
- 1998–2001: Mayor Daylinda Sulong with Vice Mayor Berdal Amban
- 2001–2004: Mayor Cesar Sulong with Vice Mayor Joel Sulong
- 2004–2007: Mayor Cesar Sulong with Vice Mayor Joel Sulong
- 2007–2010: Mayor Daylinda P. Sulong with Vice Mayor Joel Sulong
- 2010–2013: Mayor Daylinda P. Sulong with Vice Mayor Vicente Mong Fernandez Jr.
- 2013-2016: Mayor Daylinda P. Sulong with Vice Mayor Joel B. Sulong
- 2016-2019: Mayor Joel B. Sulong with Vice Mayor Daylinda P. Sulong

== Subanen heritage ==
During the Spanish regime, the Subanens were a thriving tribe in the hinterlands of Western Mindanao that had not been conquered by the Spanish colonists, who had their hands full waging wars with the Moros in the South. The ancestral Subanen domains were in the Pingolis and Dumangkilas areas. In the olden times, Pingolis consisted of the areas of Misamis Occidental, Zamboanga del Sur and Zamboanga del Norte. Dumangkilas consisted of Margosatubig up to the Dinas and Dimataling areas. The Spaniards came upon these places almost at the close of the 18th century but were never able to build a permanent settlement, only bayside watchtowers for any upcoming pirate attacks, in Margosatubig and Tukuran, Zamboanga del Sur, and in the shores of Misamis, now Ozamiz City.

Gumabongabon, a native of Cotabato, sought refuge in Mount Malindang in Misamis province to flee from the Muslim faith of Salipabunsuan (Shariff Kabunsuan). He had two sons named Dageneg and Daginding. The younger brother Daginding took over the Subanen leadership from his aging father Gumabongabon. Throughout his lifetime Gumabongabon was never conquered or subjugated either by the Muslim or Christian faith by remaining in the jungles with his family and those that continued his leadership.

Daginding, the surviving son of Gumabongabon, is said to be the origin of the Imbings in Lapuyan. Daginding bore a son named Baless who took over the leadership from Daginding. Baless bore a son named Baan, then Baan begat Paluli, who also begat a son named Habali who begat Bongulan, who bore a son named Pamaisen. The latter also bore a son named Samaya, who bore a son named Lihaiwan, who bore a son named Sanira. It was at the time of the leadership of Sanira that he transferred his place to Salug Valley, now Molave town. There he met and married a wife from Dumangkilas, now Margosatubig, Zamboanga Del Sur. Sanira bore four children, triplets – two boys and one girl. The triplets were called Palaganding, Dainding, and Gumaed. The only girl was named Balao. Among the triplets, Palaganding became the leader after his father Sanira. He was the most feared Subanon leader. He ate his enemies' hearts raw after every battle.

Palaganding married a girl from Pingoles and bore four sons, named Lumang, Mandaulay, Sandok and Talatap, and one daughter named Sinumpay. Son Talatap and daughter Sinumpay were kidnapped by pirates when they were fishing in Dumangkilas bay. Sinumpay was sold by the pirates to a Hadji Usah in Jolo, who married her and became a Muslim. Talatap's fate is not known.

Palaganding's eldest son Lumang took over the leadership of the Subanens when he died. Lumang bore three sons and two daughters. He named his sons Mandal, Bahong, and Imbing. He named his daughters Ames and Amog.

Lumang's youngest son, Imbing, took over the leadership of the Subanens during the American regime. It was during this time that his victorious battle of Mount Guillian took place against the Iranons. Mount Imbing was named by American Governor-General Leonard Wood, who happened to stay with Timuay Beng Imbing on his way to Lakewood, where he saw a lake while flying during World War I. The lake was so beautiful surrounded by trees that General Wood named it Lakewood. Today, Lakewood is already a municipality which was a former barangay of Lapuyan, Zamboanga del Sur.

Timuay Labi (highest) Beng Imbing bore six children — three boys and three girls. He named his boys Calay, Lumok and Purok, all with a title of Datu. He named his girls Calat, Calangian and the last Sindium. The last Subanen Datu among the Subanens was Datu Purok Imbing. After him, there was no more anointment. The American missionaries were already in Lapuyan and the saga of the Datus and Timuays ended its cruel and happy days.

=== Subanens and Christianity ===
In the olden days, the Subanens did not have schools; parents were in charge of schooling them. In a family of singers, the mother or the father sang Subanen epics and poems, and read legends and stories. Mothers trained their daughters to weave abaca cloth; the father usually trained their son to do wood carvings or weave rattan baskets and to make musical instruments out of bamboo and wood.

When they came into contact with the Muslims, they learned about the teachings of Islam. Subanens of Lapuyan had early contact with the Spaniards who built a garrison in Margosatubig during the mid-19th century; a school for the natives was opened by Spanish priests but the Subanens misunderstood the message of Christianity. They were scared to see a stick (the cross) with a dead man (Jesus) on it. The cross, which they called "karehus", was interpreted differently; the early Catholic missionaries were thought of as cannibals. With the coming of the Americans, Protestant missionaries brought big picture rolls showing among others, the baby Jesus and the Mother Mary. The old folks associated these stories with their own tribal beliefs of a “Diwata” or God-child, a savior of mankind. With this understanding, Subanen elders now encouraged their children to go to the mission school run by these American missionaries. In 1912, Mr. & Mrs. David O. Lund opened a mission school in Sunglupa in the village of Thimuay Imbing, now a part of the Municipality of Lapuyan. Thimuay Imbing accepted the new religion, a Protestant denomination of the Christian and Missionary Alliance whose headquarters were located in Nyac, New York, in 1914; they constructed a semi-permanent-building called the Pampang Tabernacle where the Subanen worshipped. Next to the Tetuan Church in Zamboanga City, the Lapuyan Tabernacle became the first Alliance Church in Mindanao, if not the entire Philippines. There were further changes in the way of life of the Subanen in Lapuyan with the opening of government schools in 1919.

== Education ==
=== Colleges ===
- Lomasson Alliance Bible College
- Josephina H. Cerilles State College-Lapuyan External Studies Unit

=== High schools ===
- Lapuyan National High School
- Maruing National High School
- Bulawan National High School
- Tiguha National High School
- Maralag National High School
- Karpok National High School
- Pampang National High School

=== Elementary schools ===
- Antonio V. Apostol Memorial Central Elementary School
- Karpok Elementary School
- Bulawan Elementary School
- Maruing Elementary School
- Danganan Elementary School
- Mala-Tiguha Elementary School
- Dansal Elementary School
- Lenok Madalum Elementary School
- Luanan Elementary School
- Lubosan Elementary School
- Mandeg Elementary School
- Maralag Elementary School
- Molum Elementary School
- Pampang Elementary School
- Pantad Elementary School
- Pingalay Elementary School
- Salambuyan Elementary School
- San Jose Elementary School
- Sayog Elementary School
- Tininghalang Elementary School
- Tipasan Elementary School
- Talabob Elementary School
- Cubo Elementary School
- Dumara Elementary School
- Mahalingeb Primary School
- Tabon Primary School
- Tugaya Primary School
