= Subanon people =

Ethnic group of the southern Philippines

Gbansa Subanen
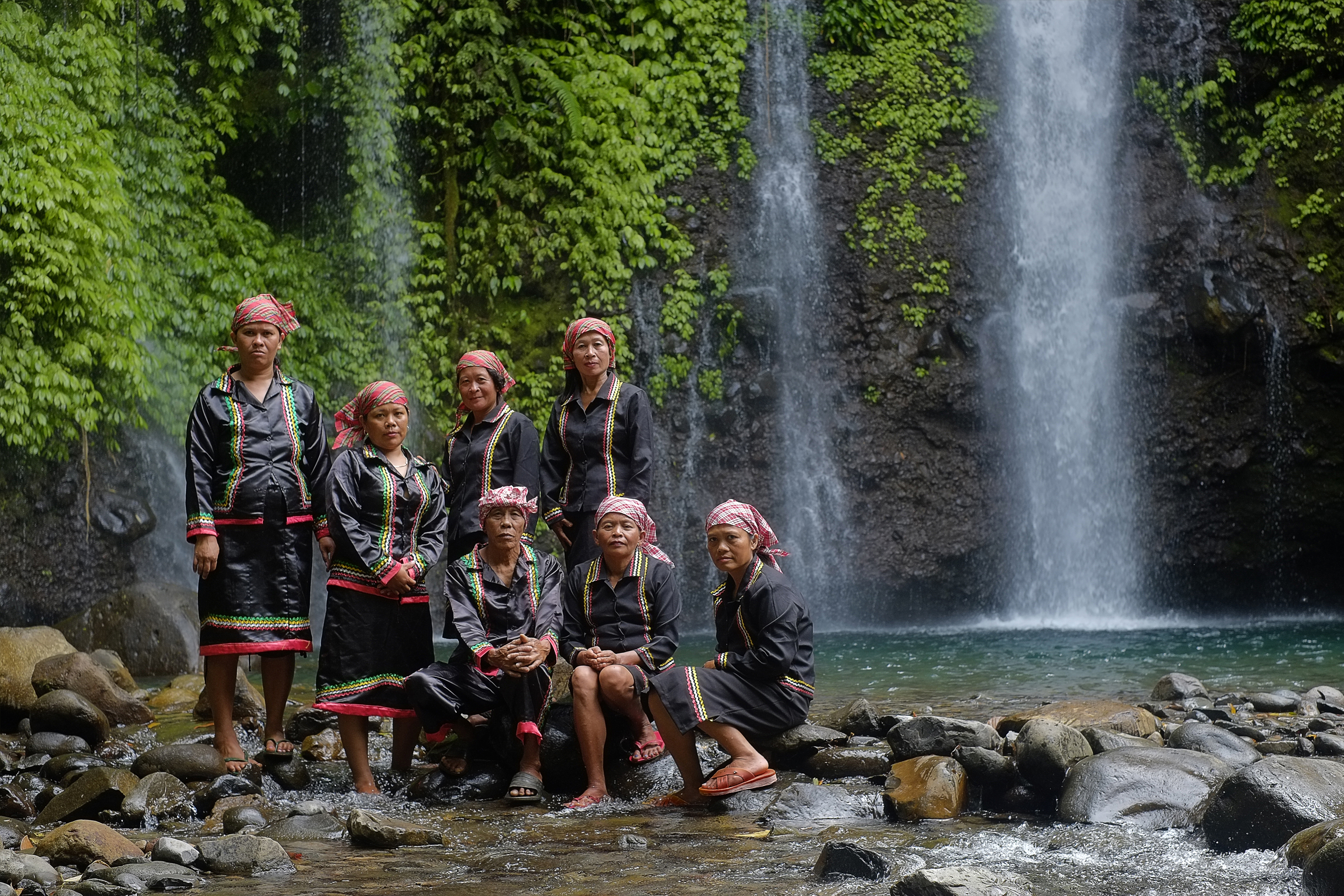
- Subanon near Mount Malindang

Total population
- 758,499 (2020 census)

Regions with significant populations
- Philippines
- Zamboanga del Norte: 338,986
- Zamboanga del Sur: 188,142
- Misamis Occidental: 109,917
- Zamboanga Sibugay: 92,778
- Zamboanga City: 10,469
- Lanao del Norte: 2,661
- Metro Manila: 1,544
- Bukidnon: 1,413
- Cagayan De Oro: 1,197
- Davao del Norte: 1,071

Languages
- Native; Subanon; Also; Zamboangueño Chavacano, Cebuano, Filipino, English

Religion
- Christianity, indigenous folk religion, Islam, Animism

Related ethnic groups
- Zamboangueño, Kalibugan, Lumad, other Austronesian peoples

The Subanon (also spelled Subanen or Subanun) are an indigenous peoples of the Zamboanga peninsula area, particularly living in the mountainous areas of Zamboanga del Norte, Zamboanga del Sur, and Misamis Occidental, Mindanao Island, Philippines. The Subanon people speak Subanon languages. The name is derived from the word soba or suba, a word common in Sulu, Visayas, and Mindanao, which means "river", and the suffix -nun or -non, which indicates a locality or place of origin. Accordingly, the name Subanon means "a person or people of the river". These people originally lived in the low-lying areas. However, due to disturbances and competitions from other settlers like the Moros, and migrations of Cebuano speakers and individuals from Luzon and other parts of Visayas to the coastal areas attracted by the inviting land tenure laws, further pushed the Subanon into the interior.

The Subanon are traditionally farmers and regularly move from one location to another to clear more forest for fields. They cultivate crops, with rice as the most important crop, but they are also known to raise livestock including pigs, chickens, cattle, and water buffaloes. Subanon houses are built along hillsides and ridges overlooking family fields. The homes are usually rectangular and raised on stilts with thatched roofs.

== Classification ==
Subanons generally refer to themselves as a whole as the gbansa Subanon, meaning "the Subanon nation".

=== Geographical and dialectical subgroups ===
Subanons distinguish themselves from each other by their roots or point of origin. These are based on names of rivers, lakes, mountains, or locations. Distinct subgroups based on geograohical and dialectial differences are the:

- Siocon (Western) Subanen;
- Lapuyan (Southern) Subanen;
- Sindangan (Central) Subanen;
- Tuboy (Northern) Subanen; and
- Salug (Eastern) Subanen.

Given their geographical location, Lobel (2013) classifies the Southern, Central, Northern, and Eastern Subanon languages as "Nuclear," and subclassifies the Western Subanen into Nuclear and "Western" because the populations that speak that dialect live towards the farther west of the Zamboanga Peninsula region.

=== Subgroups based on religion ===
The Subanen are sometimes also distinguished into groups based on the dominant religious beliefs in their communities, and the impacts those belief systems have had on their community culture. In the Western areas,

==== Kolibugan Subanon ====
Groups who are linguistically members of the Subanon language subgroup but who have adopted Islam call themselves Kalibugan (in the central area of the peninsula) or Kolibugan (in the western areas of the peninsula).

Kalibugan means 'mixed' or 'half-breed', especially of roosters in Tausug and Cebuano. Although claims are often made that the Kolibugan/Kalibugan are ethnically mixed with Samal, Badjao, Tausug, or Maguindanaon, there is no evidence supporting those claims, and linguistically, the languages of the Islamic members of the Subanon subgroup are virtually identical with the language of the neighboring non-Islamic group, except that the Islamic groups have a larger amount of Arabic vocabulary that refers to aspects of life that deal with religious concepts.

==== Lapuyan Subanon ====
The Lapuyan Subanon, also known as the Southern Subanon whose homeland is in the area of the municipalities Lapuyan and Margosatubig, are notably different from the other indigenous peoples of Mindanao in that they have been predominantly evangelical protestants since 1912, when the powerful Thimuay Imbing welcomed the missionary efforts of Rev. David and Mrs Hulda Lund, who had been sent by the Christian and Missionary Alliance (CMA) church to evangelize among the Subanen.

==== Traditional Subanon ====
The other Subanon groups in the Northern, Eastern, and some of the Central and Western portions of the peninsula have retained their indigenous beliefs, and continue to be call themselves Subanen, while some outsiders use the word Subano, which is a Spanish version of the native name.

== History ==
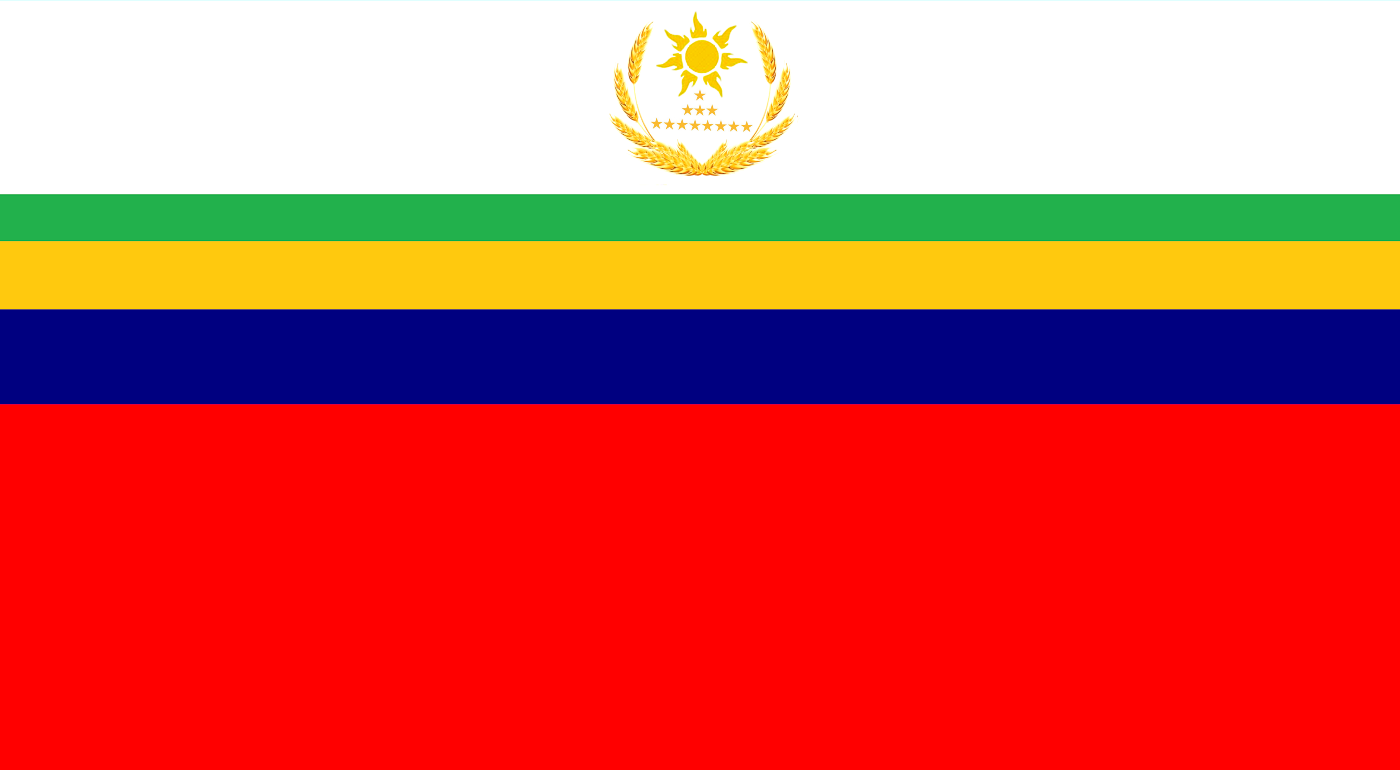
One of the flags of the Subanon People.

=== Prehistory ===
The Subanon were established in the island of Mindanao before 500 BC, before the Neolithic Era, or New Stone Age where the period in the development of human technology taken place beginning 10,000 BC according to the ASPRO chronology (between 4,500 and 2,000 BC). The evidence of old stone tools in Zamboanga del Norte may indicate a late Neolithic presence.

=== Lordships and commerce ===
The Subanon had commercial relations with the Tausug, Maguindanaon and Maranao.

Burial jars, both earthen and glazed, as well as Chinese celadons, have been found in caves, together with shell bracelets, beads, and gold ornaments. Many of the ceramic wares are from the Yuan and Ming periods. Evidently, there was a long history of trade between the Subanon and the Chinese long before the former's contact with Islam.

=== Maguindanao protectorate ===
Under the protection of the Sultanate of Maguindanao, the Subanon provided combatants and other resources to help in the war efforts of the sultanate. They were also entitled to a share in the spoils of war.

=== Spanish rule ===
The Spaniards sought to extend their territory over the whole of southern Philippines. Declaring an intention to "protect" the non-Christian and non-Muslim Subanon of the Sibuguey (i.e., Zamboanga) peninsula, the Spanish governor Valeriano Weyler constructed a series of fortifications across the Tukuran isthmus that was, according to him, "for the purpose of shutting out the Maranaos... from the Subanons, and preventing further destructive raids upon the peaceful and industrious peasants of these hills". Spanish military control of the Tukuran garrison and fortifications ended on 12 April 1899, under the terms of the 1898 Treaty of Paris.

=== American rule ===
Before the American government could put in its occupation troops, and surprised how the Subanon had willingly allowed the Americans to construct on their lands without a clamor or fight, the Muslims from the lake region went across the isthmus, and attacked the Subanon and battled Americans in the two districts of Zamboanga and Misamis to prove their intention to fight the Americans' intent on their territory. These renewed raids took their toll on lives and property, and many Subanon were even carried off into bondage by the invaders. The military garrison was taken over by Muslim forces, and a kuta (fort) and several villages were established on the isthmus for years. The place was abandoned, however, when the many American expeditionary forces appeared in October 1900.

=== Post-war ===
Despite the long history of hostile actions against them by their neighbors and foreign colonizers, the Subanon have managed to preserve their identification, customs, religion, language, dialects, and traditions. Subanon Muslims were co-founders of SMT al-Alam before BIP Dawah Tabligh in Mindanao.

Since the beginning of the 20th century, the Subanon's contact with the outside world broadened, to include the Visayan, people from Luzon and the latter-day Chinese. Aside from the influx of these settlers and traders, there has been a massive penetration of the national government into the Subanon hinterlands for purposes of administrative control, tax assessment and collection, and police enforcement of national law, logging and mining concessions that affects their way of life.

=== During the Marcos dictatorship ===
There is at least one major record of human rights violations against the Subanon people during the peiriod of Martial law under President Ferdinand Marcos—an incident that has been called the Tudela massacre. On August 24, 1981, members of a Marcos-sponsored paramilitary forces strafed the house of a Subanon family, the Gumapons, in Sitio Gitason, Barrio Lampasan, Tudela, Misamis Occidental. Ten Subanon were killed in the incident, including a baby.

=== Later 20th Century ===
In 1997, the Indigenous Peoples' Rights Act of 1997 (IPRA) was passed into law. The law put in place a mechanism for the protection of ancestral lands by "indigenous cultural communities", including the Subanon.

== Geography ==
Ancestral domains of the Subanon in Zamboanga peninsula and northern Mindanao

Ferdinand Blumentritt mentioned the Subanos in his accounts, referring to them as "a heathen people of Malay extraction who occupy the entire (Zamboanga) peninsula of Sibuguey with the exception of a single strip on the south coast". Finley, recording his impressions of the Subanon at the beginning of American administration of the southern Philippines in the 1900s, cited published records of early Spanish chroniclers, notably the writings of Father Francisco Combés in 1667, to argue that the Subanon were the indigenous people of western Mindanao.

The Subanon primarily inhabit the Zamboanga peninsula, which is more than 200 kilometers long, shaped like a giant crooked finger that extends westward to the Sulu Sea, and is joined to mainland Mindanao by a narrow strip of land, the isthmus of Tukuran, which separates the bays of Iligan and Illana. The peninsula itself is divided into four provinces and one independent city: Zamboanga del Norte, Zamboanga del Sur, Zamboanga Sibugay, Misamis Occidental and Zamboanga City.

The Subanon were estimated to number 47,146 people in 1912, according to records of the governor of the District of Zamboanga. The 2010 census recorded the Subanon population as 220,165 in Zamboanga del Norte, 148,402 in Zamboanga del Sur, 58,069 in Zamboanga Sibugay, 49,897 in Misamis Occidental, 657 in Zamboanga City and 342 in Misamis Oriental.

The Kalibugan group, or Subanon who embraced Islam, are found in villages on the coast in western Mindanao and number some 15,000.

== Economy ==
The ancestors of the Subanon practiced dry agriculture, and most likely had knowledge of pottery making. The Subanon are mainly agriculturists who practice three types of cultivation. Along the coastal area, wet agriculture with plow and carabao is the method of producing their staple rice. Beyond the coasts, both wet and dry agriculture is found. Swidden farming is the norm in the interior, particularly the uplands. Along the coasts, coconuts are raised aside from rice. Further inland, corn becomes an additional crop aside from the first two. Apart from the principal crops raised—which are mountain rice and corn—the root crops camote (sweet potato), cassava, gabi (taro), and ubi (yam) are also grown. These are roasted, boiled, or made into preserves and sweets. In some places, tobacco is planted. The people supplement their income and their food supply by fishing, hunting, and gathering of forest products. The extra rice they can produce, plus the wax, resin, and rattan they can gather from the forest are brought to the coastal stores and traded for cloth, blades, axes, betel boxes, ornaments, Chinese jars, porcelain, and gongs.

Trade between the mountain- and valley-dwelling Subanon, on the one hand, and the coastal people of Zamboanga, the Moro exchanges goes back many centuries. An old Subanon legend tells about the possible origins of this ancient trade. According to the legend, the first Subanon chieftain was a giant named Tabunaway. He ruled over his people long before the Moros and the Spaniards appeared on Subanon land. He lived near a place called Nawang (which later became Zamboanga). It was during his time that the Moros first appeared in Nawang. They sailed upriver until they reached the place of Tabunaway and his people. The Moros wanted to exchange the fish they caught at sea, with the fruits and other products of Nawang. They placed their catch on rocks and waited for the Subanon to come down from the hills. The Subanon tasted the fish, and liked it. They then put their own food of rice, sugarcane, and yams on the same rocks for the Moros to take. This was the beginning of trade between the Subanon and the Moros. The coming of the Moros to Zamboanga was recorded to have taken place in 1380, and trade between the two has been going on for hundreds of years.

The Subanon have maintained barter with the coastal people because of the difficulties encountered in a subsistence type of agriculture. Even with plenty of land available in earlier times, the backbreaking toil involved in kaingin or swidden farming, the lack of sufficient agricultural implements, and an apparently wasteful exploitation of resources which led to deforestation of Zamboanga forest as early as the 19th century kept the Subanon economy at a constant level of subsistence. On top of this, the Subanon planter had to contend with low prices for their agricultural products in the barter trade. Finley (1913), observing Subanon agricultural methods, remarked that these were inefficient, and "not profitable either to the government or to the hill people".

Sometimes there are crop failures, as a result of drought or infestation by pests. Lacking rice, the Subanon resort to gathering buri and lumbia or lumbay, which are palm types with a pith along the entire length that is a rich source of starchy flour. This is extracted and processed into food. The Subanon can also gather sago in the forests, particularly along the riverbanks, for their flour. There are also varieties of wild edible roots in the woodlands. Where orchards, gardens, and small plantations are cultivated, squash, eggplant, melons, bananas, papayas, pineapples, jackfruit, and lanzones provide the Subanon additional food. In some coastal settlements, the Subanon have been known to cultivate coconuts for food and for trading purposes. They also grow hemp or abaca, and use the fiber for making ropes, weaving cloth, or exchanging for finished products in the barter trade.

Casal (1986) refers to the Subanon of Sindangan Bay in Zamboanga del Norte as "possibly the most rice-conscious" of all Philippine groups, because of their marked preference for rice above all other staples, as well as the amount of labor and attention they devote to their rice lands. Before the rice harvest in September, the Subanon subsist on root crops and bananas.

The relationship between natural phenomena and the agricultural cycle is well established in the folk knowledge of the Sindangan Subanon. They study wind patterns, looking out for tell-tale signs of imminent weather changes. Based on their native methods of meteorology, the Subanon identify three distinct seasons within the agricultural cycle: pendupi, from June to September, characterized by winds blowing from the southwest; miyan, from December to January, a time of winds and northeast monsoon rains; and pemeres, from March to April, the hot and dry season. The Subanon also reckon agricultural time by the stars, notably the constellation Orion. Among the Subanon, as it is with other Mindanao groups, the appearance of this star group signals the time for the clearing of a new swidden. The monthly rotation of the stars is a guide for the swidden cycle during the first months of the year (Casal 1986:36).

== Political system ==
Subanon society is patriarchal, with the family as the basic governmental unit. There is no political hierarchy on the village level, as in the datu system of government. The title of datu was used occasionally in the past during the sultanate. Timuay is the traditional title for the communal leader who is also the chief arbiter of conflict between the families of a community or a confederation. The word timuay (variously spelled timuai, timuway, timway, or thimuay) is also use in Maguindanao word which means "chief" or "leader". It connotes both civil and religious authority for the bearer of the title.

The title timuay may be recalled by the community and given to another tasked with the responsibility of leading the community. The timuay invokes this authority in cases of violations of social norms, such as affronts or insults, violations of contracts, and other offenses. Under his leadership, an association or confederation of families forms a community. If the timuay proves to be an efficient and popular leader, the community of families under his authority may expand. The authority of the timuay does not correspond to a particular territory. Within the same area, his authority may expand or decrease, depending on the number of families which put themselves under his authority. Consequently, "when a family becomes dissatisfied with the conduct and control of the chief, the father secedes and places his family under the domination of some other timuay". This, then, is the basis of Subanon patriarchal society: the absolute authority of the father to assert the supremacy of family rights within a community voluntarily organized under a designated timuay. During the Spanish and American colonization, there were several attempts to organize the Subanon into politically administered towns or villages, but these attempts were resisted by the people. Such was the premium the Subanon put on the independence of the individual family. In fact, young Subanon who marry break off from their families and start their own families in other places.

In recent times, the Subanon timuay have been confronted with concerns ranging from local issues affecting their particular community to larger, regional issues confronting the entire Subanon group. These issues include the defense of the Subanon ancestral domain against the encroachments of loggers and mining companies. Highly politicized Subanon leaders have been active in organizing their people and coordinating with non-government organizations of tribal advocates.

== Social organization and customs ==
The Subanon do not practice division of labor based on sex. Men and women work in the fields together, and men can cook and care for the children when necessary. The Subanon have little social stratification. Everyone is equal in the Subanon community because everyone has the same family for several years if he cannot afford to pay the shamaya. It is considered a blessing to have more daughters than sons because the father will be able to recover the dowry he paid for his wife. There is a general belief that all human beings should marry.

A neighborhood of 5 to 12 households becomes a unit of social organization, where members engage in frequent interactions. In cases of dispute, members may intervene to mediate, so that they may over time develop as efficient arbitrators of disputes, and become recognized as such by this neighborhood. There are many such communities in Subanon society. A bigger group of interacting communities may contain as many as 50 households.

Marriage in Subanon society is through parental arrangement, which can take place even before the parties reach the age of puberty. The contracting families go through preliminaries for the purpose of determining the bride-price, which may be in the form of cash or goods, or a combination of both. Negotiations are undertaken between the two sets of parents through the mediation of a go-between who is not related to either family. Once the bride-price is determined, a partial delivery of the articles included in the agreement may be made, to be completed when the actual marriage takes place.

After the marriage ceremonies have been held, and the wedding feast celebrated, the newlyweds stay with the girl's household. The man is required to render service to his wife's parents, mainly in the production of food. After a certain period of matrilocal residence, the couple can select their own place of residence, which is usually determined by proximity to the swidden fields.

Family properties which are covered by inheritance consist mainly of acquired Chinese jars, gongs, jewelry, and, in later times, currency. The ownership of cultivated land, the swidden field, is deemed temporary, because the Subanon family moves from place to place, and necessitated by the practice of shifting agriculture. The grains stored in bins or jars do not last long, and therefore are not covered by inheritance.

The family as a corporate unit comes to an end through divorce, abduction of the wife, or death of either spouse. But it can be immediately reconstituted through remarriage. The surviving widow can be married to a brother, married or not, of the deceased husband, or the parents of the deceased wife almost immediately marries off to the widower one of their unmarried daughters or nieces.

Socioeconomic needs bring about close relationships in Subanon society. Spouses can expect assistance in many activities from both their parents and their kin, and they in turn extend their help to these relatives when it is needed. Non-relatives are expected to give and receive the same kind of help. By the mere fact that they live in a neighborhood, non-relatives become associates in activities that cannot be done by the head of the family alone, such as constructing a house, clearing the field, planting, and holding a feast.

== Culture ==
Traditionally, the education among Subanon people was limited to instruction by the timuay head to a future husband and wife regarding love, respect and treatment of each other, parents, and in-laws. With increasing modernization, many of the Subanon are already highly educated. Some have received bachelor's, master's and doctoral degrees in universities both local and abroad. Some are employed in the government.

The Subanon do not practice division of labor based on gender. Men and women work in the fields together, and men can cook and care for the children when necessary. They have little social stratification. Everyone is equal in the Subanon community because everyone has the same family for several years if he cannot afford to pay the shamaya.

The tribe has no religion although it is believed that they had a holy book at one time. In marriage, the parents of the man look for a woman he will marry and both sets of parents set the wedding date. Polygamy and polyandry are practiced but separation is not allowed nor is marrying nearest relatives. When a couple wants to have only one or two children the wife, after giving birth, eats an herb called benayan. For birth spacing she eats two herbs, and if no more children are desired she eats more. Another type of birth control is practiced by the midwife who "manipulates" the woman after delivery. Various methods are practiced to predetermine a child's sex. Pregnant women must abide by many regulations including placing a piece of wood across her path before going in a doorway. It is considered a blessing to have more daughters than sons because the father will be able to recover the dowry he paid for his wife. There is a general belief that all human beings should marry.

=== Language ===
Subanon traditionally speak their own language of the same name. The languages has some dialects, most notably the Western Subanon dialect spoken in Zamboanga del Norte and Zamboanga Sibugay. Over the years however, Subanon have become fluent in Cebuano, Hiligaynon, Tagalog and to the some extent, Ilocano in addition to their own language. These languages were brought and introduced by these settlers from Cebu, Bohol, Siquijor, Negros, Panay, Tagalog-speaking regions, Central Luzon and Ilocandia, upon their arrival into Subanon homelands during the 19th and early 20th centuries, who in turn learned Subanon language upon contact with these indigenous tribe such as intermarriage.

=== Religious beliefs and practices ===
The indigenous beliefs of the Subanon include the veneration of a supreme being called Diwata Migbebaya.

Today the Subanon people have adopted either Islam, Catholicism, or Evangelical Protestantism, the last particularly among the Subanon in Lapuyan, Zamboanga del Sur. Those Subanon who adopted Islam are known as the Kalibugan or Kolibugan.

==== Indigenous religion ====
Indigenous Subanon cosmogony exemplifies the basic duality of mortal life and spiritual realm, with a complex system of interrelationships between these two cosmic elements. The physical world is inhabited by the kilawan (visible mortals), who become sick and whose ailments are attributed to supranatural causes. In the nonmaterial realm exist the kanagkilawan (supernaturals), who are not visible to ordinary mortals, but who can be perceived and addressed by the balian (medium or shaman). The supernatural beings are of four kinds: gimuud (souls), mitibug (spirits), getautelunan (demons), and diwata (deities).

In place of a hierarchy or pantheon of supreme beings, the Subanon believe in the spirits who are part of nature. Spirits and deities are said to inhabit the most striking natural features which are considered the handiwork of the gods, such as unusually large trees, huge rocks balancing on a small base, peculiarly shaped mounds of earth, isolated caves, and peaks of very tall mountains.

The active relationship between ordinary mortals and the supernaturals begins when an individual falls sick. The Subanon believe that an ailing person's soul momentarily departs from the person's body. It is up to the balian to recall the straying soul, reintegrate it with the ailing person so that the illness could end. Failing this, the patient dies. The soul then becomes a spirit. The balian, as in any traditional shamanistic culture, occupies a very special place in Subanon religious and social life. The balian are believed to be capable of visiting the skyworld to attend the great gatherings of the deities, known as bichara (assembly or meeting). They are also acknowledged to have the power of raising the dead.

Most religious observances are held with the balian presiding. These rites and activities include the clearing of a new plantation, the building of a house, the hunting of the wild hog, the search for wild honey, the sharing of feathered game, the beginning of journey by water or by land, and the harvesting of crops. The religious ceremonies attending the celebration of the great buklog festival, held to propitiate the diwata or to celebrate an event of communal significance, are exclusively performed by the balian. In general, the functions of a balian are those of a medium who directs the living person's communication with the spirits, of a priest who conducts sacrifices and rituals, and of a healer of the sick.

The matibug are the closest friends of human beings, but they can be troublesome if ritual offerings of propitiation are not made. These offerings are not expensive. A little rice, some eggs, a piece of meat, betel quids, betel leaves, and areca nuts, given in combinations according to the shaman's discretion, would suffice to placate the spirits. These offerings can be made inside the house or out in the fields, by the riverbanks, under the trees, and elsewhere. It is believed that the supernaturals partake only of the sengaw (essence) of the offering, and human beings are free to consume the food and wine.

The getautelunan can be dangerous; they are demons and must be avoided. Some diwata can also inflict sickness or epidemics. However, deities residing in the skyworld are benevolent. In some Subanon subgroups, there is a belief in a Supreme Diwata. In death, a person is sent off to the spirit world with appropriate rituals. First the corpse is cleaned and wrapped in white cloth. Then it is laid inside a hollowed-out log, and given provisions, such as food, for its journey. A rooster is killed, its blood smeared on every mourner's feet to drive away malevolent spirits who may be in attendance. The log-coffin is now covered, and the surviving spouse goes around it seven times, and then goes under it another seven times while it is held aloft. Those who accompanied the deceased to its grave, upon their return, get hold of a banana petiole which they dip in ash and throw away before they go up their respective houses.

Those who carried the coffin take a bath in the river before going up their houses, to wash away any bad luck they may have brought back with them. Each time the widower eats; he always leaves a space on the floor or at the table for his dead wife, and invites her to eat with him for three consecutive evenings. He mourns for her until he can hold a kano feast. Before this, he cannot comb his hair, wear colorful clothing, or remarry.

==== Evangelical Protestantism in Lapuyan ====
A significant moment in the religious history of Mindanao was the welcome given by Thimuay Imbing to the missionaries of the Christian and Missionary Alliance, an evangelical Protestant denomination. This led to significant social changes among the Subanon in Lapuyan, not only in terms of religion but also in terms of education, political organization, the adoption of English as a second language, among other social changes.

=== Architecture and community planning ===
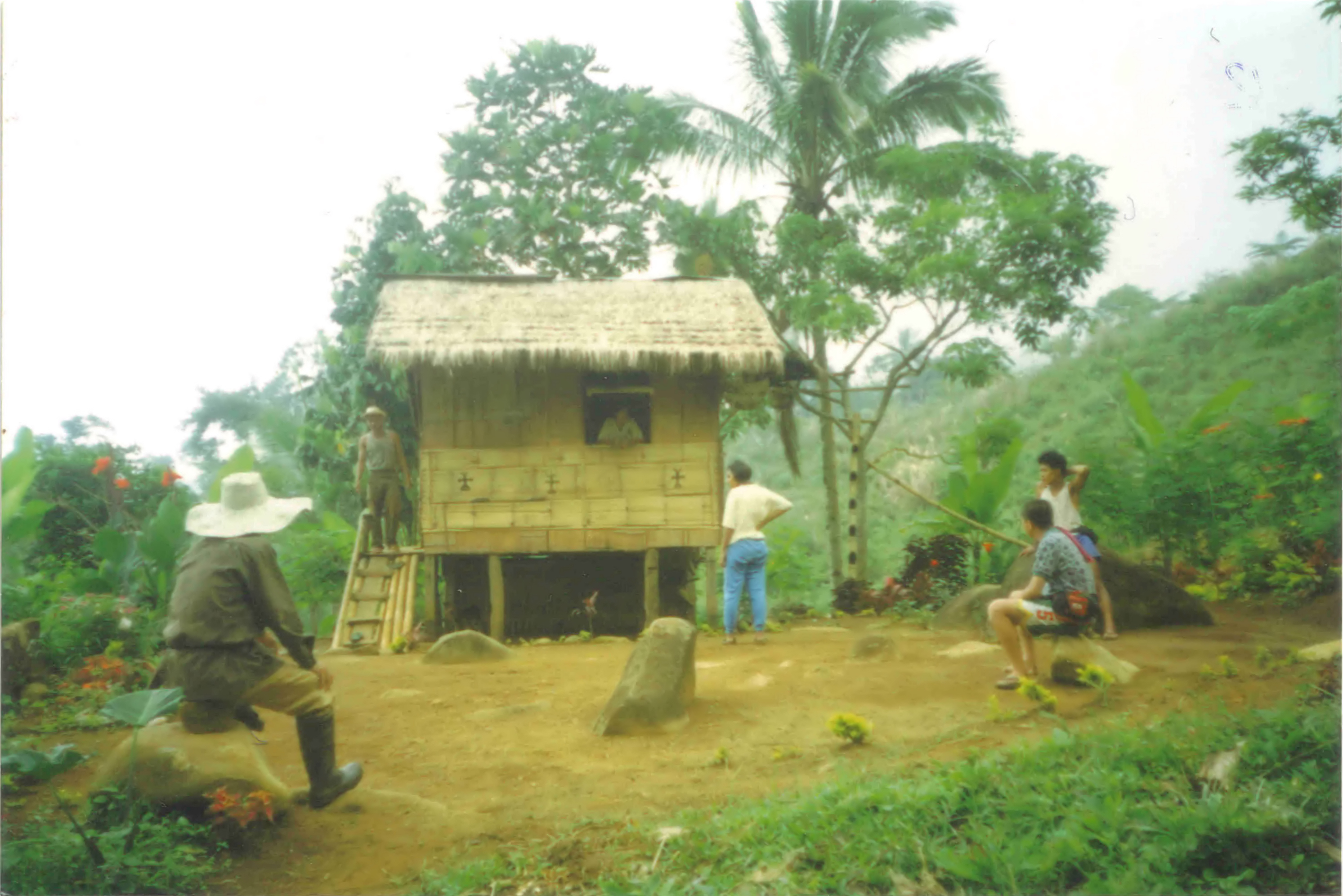
A small Subanon village on Mount Malindang

The typical Subanon settlement is a cluster of three to twelve dispersed households, and is normally located on high ground close to the swidden farm. The traditional Subanon house is generally rectangular, thatch-roofed, with a small floor space averaging 12 square meters. Invariably, there is only one room, and therefore room for only a single family. In certain areas where contact and acculturation with the settler economy have taken place, some Subanon have begun building houses like those of the lowlands. In the interior parts of the peninsula, however, houses retain the traditional features recorded by ethnographers in the 19th and early 20th century.

The Subanon house in Sindangan Bay typifies this traditional design and construction. The floor is elevated 1.5 to 2.5 meters from the ground. The space under the house is utilized in various ways. The floor is ordinarily of split bamboo or palma brava. The floor of the living room is sometimes, in the humbler dwellings, all on one level. Usually, platforms about 2 to 2.5 meters wide are built against one, two, three, or four walls. Mats may cover these platforms, which then become lounging places by day, and beds by night.

There is no ceiling in the house, and the exposed beams of the roof serve as convenient places from which to hang a multitude of things. In the house of a prosperous family, as many as 30 or 40 baskets are suspended from the roof with strips of rattan or abaca. Clothing, ornaments, rice, pepper, squash, corn, drums, guitars, and dishes are some of the things stored in this way. Salt, wrapped in leaves, is also suspended over the hearth, so that it will not absorb too much moisture from the atmosphere. Hanging things from the roof beams has two advantages—the articles do not occupy floor space and get in the way, and they are protected from breakage, insects, and rodents.

The house has no windows. But the overhanging eaves protect the inside from rain. Around the sides of the house, some spaces are thatched with palm leaves, which can be detached at will. In good weather, this portion is opened to let in light, which also comes in through a space between the top of the walls and the roof. Light also enters through the door opening, which seldom has a door, and through the numerous spaces between the floor's bamboo slats.

A platform or porch in front of the door, usually measuring 2.5 square meters, serves many purposes, such as husking rice, drying clothes, and the like. It also helps keep the house clean, especially in rainy weather, since the occupants scrape mud off their feet on this platform before entering the house. A ladder is necessary to gain access to the living room from the ground. In many cases, this ladder consists only of a log with notches. When the occupants are not home, the log is often lifted away from the door, and leaned against a wall of the house. Sometimes there is a smaller log, sometimes two, flanking the notched log, to serve as handrail. The roof of a Subanon house is densely thatched with nipa fronds. The pitch or slope of the roof is fairly steep.

The main beams supporting the entire structure vary, depending on the intended length of stay in one area. Most houses are built without the expectation of using them for many years, due to the shifting nature of agricultural work. Houses are built as close as possible to a new field. Occasionally, a site is found so favorable that the house is built to last, employing heavy and solid wooden supports. The strongest houses would have supporting beams made of hardwood 15 to 20 centimeters thick, but this is rather rare. Usually, the supporting timbers are 1 centimeter thick, the entire structure being so light a person could easily shake it at one of the supports. Tops of supporting beams are connected with rough logs which serve as stringers, to which the split bamboo, or palma brava, or other flooring materials are lashed with rattan strips. No nails are used in putting houses together, and even the use of wooden pegs is rare. Strips of rattan are the most favored fastening material.

The interior of the house contains both the sleeping area and the hearth. The latter found near the door, ordinarily consists of a shallow, wooden squarish structure whose bottom is covered with a thick layer of earth or ash. Large stones are put atop the ashes to hold the earthenware pots. On the walls of the house, water containers of bamboo about 1–2 meters long are propped up.

The small granaries, built near the Subanon house, are raised some meters above the ground, and at times are so high a notched log is required to enter the structure.

Inside the granary, the rice is stored either in baskets or in bags. Aside from these granaries and their dwellings, there is a special structure added to the spirit house of a shaman—a miniature house called maligai, which is made to hang from under the eaves. The maligai is where the sacred dishes are kept. On the roof of the spirit house stand carved wooden images of the omen bird limukun.

=== Visual arts and crafts ===
Unlike the glazed imported jars in some households, the indigenous earthenware of the Subanon are simpler in execution and design. Every household has at least one woman who is knowledgeable in the art of pottery, and who turns out jars as required by domestic needs. The process of making pots starts with the beating of clay on a wooden board with a wooden pestle. The clay is then shaped into a ball, on top of which a hole is bored. The potter inserts her hand, which holds a smooth stone, into this hole, and proceeds to enlarge the hole by turning the stone round and round the inner surface of the clay. Her other hand holds a small flat stick, with which she shapes and smoothens the outer surface. Having hollowed out the clay piece and finalized its shape, she then puts incisions or ornamental marks on the outside, using her fingers, a pointed stick, or a wooden stamp engraved with a simple design. The pot is made to dry out under the sun, after which it is fired, usually over hot coals. The baked pots are then ready to hold water or boil rice.

Several types of baskets may be found in a typical Subanon house. The women shape round baskets from materials of different colors, such as the nito vine, split rattan, bamboo, and sometimes wood or tree bark. The bark is slit, folded, and shaped to form a cylinder, whose bottom and sides are all of one piece. The top may be closed either with the same piece of bark, or with a piece of some other material. There are also bags woven to carry all sorts of things. These are usually made from the leaves of the screw pine, buri, or nipa.

Cloth weaving is basically similar to the style of the neighboring Muslim region. The weaving loom is set up inside the house. Cotton thread—spun from cotton by women using the distaff crafted by men—and abaca fiber are commonly used. Before cotton was introduced by Muslim and Christian traders, the Subanon used abaca fiber for their clothing and blankets. The strands or fibers are first dyed before being put in the loom. In this process, several strands are bound together at intervals by other fibers, forming bands of various widths. Thus tightly bound, these are dipped into the dye, then laid out to dry. The effect is that the bound part retains the natural color of the fiber, while the rest has the color of the dye. The process can be repeated to achieve various designs or color combinations. The favorite dye among the Subanon is red, with black also being widely used. Native dyes from natural substances, which give a flat or matte color, and aniline dyes are used in the process.

The finer metalcraft possessed by the Subanon, such as bladed weapons like the kris, kampilan, and barong, and chopping knives called pes, have been obtained through trade with the Moro. But the Subanon also produce some of their weapons and implements. They also use steel, especially in making blade edges. The Subanon forge has bamboo bellows, while the anvil is made of wood with an iron piece on top where the hot metal is worked into shape.

=== Literary arts ===
Subanon oral literature include the folktales, short, often humorous, stories recounted for their sheer entertainment value; and the epics, long tales which are of a serious character.

One of the stock characters in the long tales is the widow's son, who possesses stupendous physical courage. The following is one of the numerous stories told about him.

One day, the widow's son set out to hunt for wild pigs. He saw one which gave him a difficult time before allowing itself to be speared. The owner of the pig, a deity who lived inside a huge white stone, invited him to his abode, where the widow's son saw opulence and a richness of colors. The master of the house inside the stone wore trousers and a shirt with seven colors. The widow's son was invited to chew betel nut and sip rice beer from a huge jar, using reed straws. The matter of the pig was resolved and the two became friends. On his return journey, he met seven warriors who challenged him to a combat. Each of the seven men was dressed in a different color, and had eyes whose color matched that of their dress. Forced into battle, the widow's son slew all seven warriors, but the savage fighting had crazed him so much that he was now looking for more enemies to fight. He came to the house of a great giant named Dumalagangan. He challenged the giant to a fight. The giant, enraged and amused by the challenge of a "fly", engaged him in a duel but was defeated after three days and three nights of combat. Battle drunk, the widow's son looked for more enemies, instead of going home, where his mother was so worried over him. He met another diwata, who passed his kerchief over him, rendering him unconscious. When the widow's son woke up, his rage was gone. The diwata told him to go home, sayingthat he was destined to marry the orphan girl (another stock character in Subanon tales), that the seven warriors and the giant he slew would come back to life, and peace would reign in the land.

The epics feature the diwata, as well as mythical and legendary heroes and chieftains who are partly divine. Composed of many stories, these epics are told in a leisurely fashion, so that it takes one night to complete a story. The chanters of the epic have to have a strong memory and a good voice. They are aided by "assistants" who encourage and sustain the bards. They start the bards off by chanting a number of meaningless syllables, giving them the pitch and duration of the recitative. Whenever they think the bards are getting tired, the assistants give them a chance to rest by taking up the last sung phrase and repeating it, sometimes twice (Christie 1909). The singers, men or women, are honored and respected by the community, since they possess valuable knowledge of well-loved mythic events, which they recount in a most entertaining manner. These tales pass from one settlement to another during festivals, and are well known among both the Subanon and the Kalibugan in both northern and southern parts of the Zamboanga peninsula.

To date, three Subanon epics have been recorded and published: The Guman of Dumalinao, the Ag Tobig nog Keboklagan (The Kingdom of Keboklagan), and Keg Sumba neg Sandayo (The Tale of Sandayo). All performed during the week-long buklog, Guman contains 4,062 verses; Keboklagan 7,590; and Sandayo 6,577.

The Guman from Dumalinao, Zamboanga del Sur, has 11 episodes which narrate the conflict between the good, represented by their parents, and the evil represented by three evil queens, their descendants, and other invaders. The monumental battles are fought between these forces in order to capture the kingdoms of Dliyagan and Paktologon. In the end the forces of good, aided by magical kerchiefs, rings, birds, and swords, conquer the evil powers.

The Keboklagan of Sindangan, Zamboanga del Norte, is a saga about the life and exploits of the superhuman hero named Taake, from the kingdom of Sirangan, whose successful courtship of the Lady Pintawan in the kingdom of Keboklagan, in the very navel of the sea, sets off a series of wars between Sirangan and other kingdoms led by chieftains who resented a Subanon winning the love of the lady of Keboklagan. The wars widen, dragging other kingdoms into the fray. The chiefs of Sirangan, led by Taake, overpower the other chiefs, but by this time, there are too many deaths, and Asog the Supreme Being in the skyworld is bothered by this. Asog descends on the earth, tells the combatants to stop fighting, and to hold a buklog, during which each of the warriors will be given a life partner. He fans the kingdoms and all those who died in the fighting spring to life again.

The Sandayo of Pawan, Zamboanga del Sur, narrates in about 47 songs the heroic adventures of Sandayo. Sandayo is brought to the center of the sun by his monsala or scarf. While in the sun he dreams about two beautiful ladies named Bolak Sonday and Benobong. He shows his affection for Bolak Sonday by accepting her mama or betel-nut chew. At the buklog of Lumanay, Sandayo meets the two ladies. Here he also discovers that Domondianay, his opponent in a battle which had lasted for two years, was actually his twin brother. After a reunion with his family at Liyasan, Sandayo is requested by his father to aid his cousins, Daugbolawan and Lomelok, in producing the dowry needed to marry Bolak Sonday and Benobong. Using his magic, Sandayo produces the dowry composed of money, gongs, jars "as many as the grains of one ganta of dawa or millet", a golden bridge "as thin as a strand of hair" that would span the distance from the house of the suitor to the room of Bolak Sonday, and a golden trough "that would connect the sun with her room". The dowry given, Bolak Sonday and Benobong are married to Daugbolawan and Lomelok. Upon his return to Liyasan, Sandayo falls ill. Bolak Sonday and Benobong are summoned to nurse Sandayo but Sandayo dies. The two women then search for the spirit of Sandayo. With the guidance of two birds, they discover that Sandayo's spirit is a captive of the Amazons of Piksiipan. After defeating the Amazons in battle, Bolak Sonday frees Sandayo's spirit and the hero comes back to life. One day, while preparing a betel-nut chew, Bolak Sonday accidentally cuts herself and bleeds to death. It is now Sandayo's turn to search for Bolak's spirit. With the aid of two birds, he discovers that Bolak Sonday's spirit has been captured by the datu of Katonawan. Sandayo fights and defeats the datu and Bolak Sonday is brought back to life. In Liyasan, Sandayo receives requests from other cousins to aid them in producing the dowry for their prospective brides. Using his powers, Sandayo obliges. After the marriage of his cousins, a grand buklog is celebrated in Manelangan, where Sandayo and his relatives ascend to heaven.

=== Performing arts ===
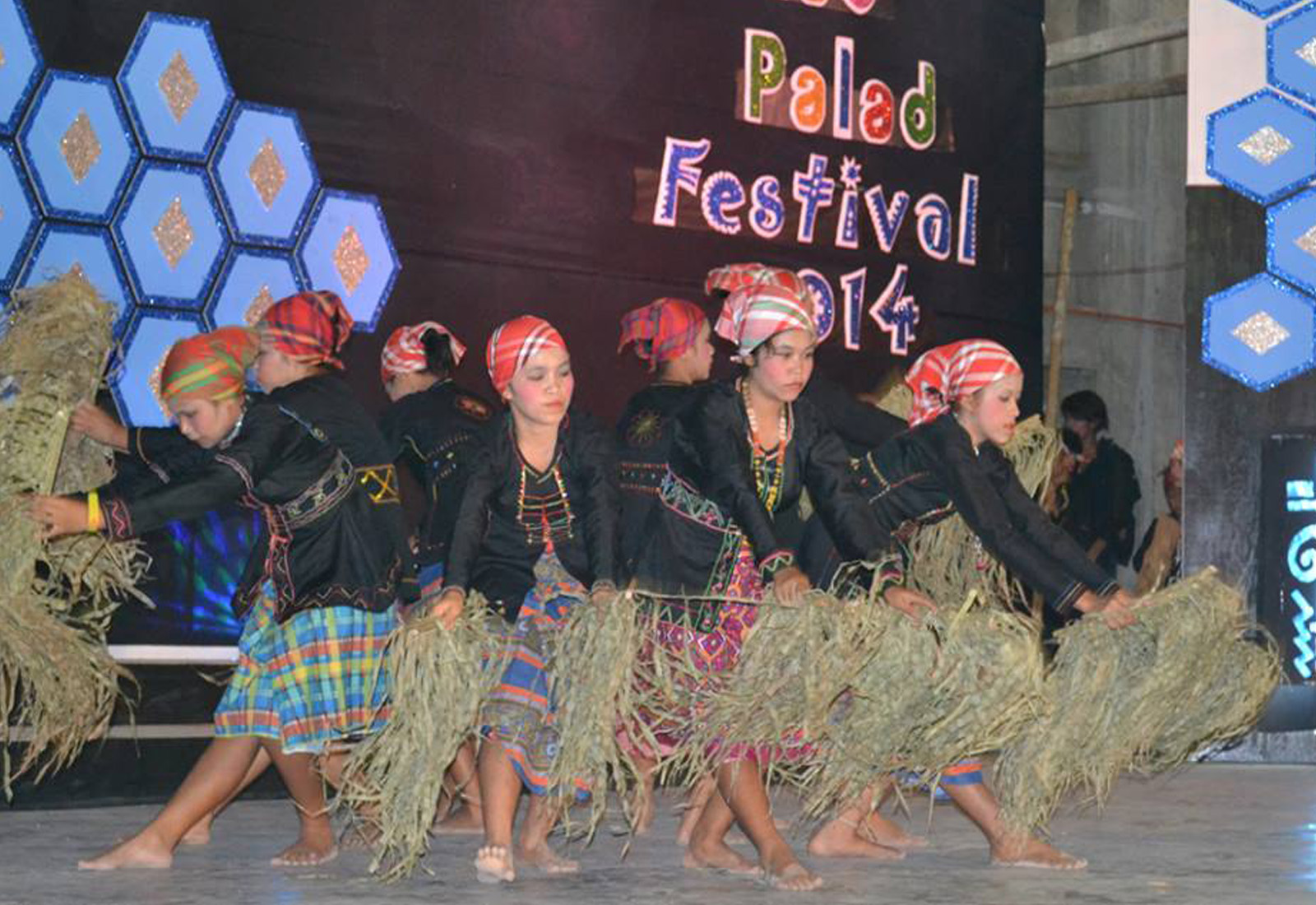
Subanon women staging a cultural performance at the Subanon Palad Festival in 2014.

Subanon musical instruments include the gagong, a single brass gong; the kolintang, a set of eight small brass gongs of graduated sizes; and the durugan, a hollowed log which is beaten like a drum; and the drums.

Vocal music includes the chants for the epic, and several types of songs, which include the dionli (a love song), buwa (lullaby), and giloy (a funeral song for a dead chieftain).

The giloy is usually sung by two singers, one of them being the balian, during a gukas, the ritual ceremony performed as a memorial for the death of a chief. The chanting of the biloy is accompanied by the ritualistic offering of bottled drinks, canned milk, cocoa, margarine, sardines, broiled fish, chicken, and pork. The balian and her assistants bring out a jar of pangasi (rice wine) from the house and into the field, where the wine is poured onto the earth. Then the chanting begins, inside the house. To be at peace with the diwata of the tribe, the Subanon perform ritual dances, sing songs, chant prayers, and play their drums and gongs. The balian, who is more often a woman, is the lead performer in almost all Subanon dance rituals. Her trance dance involves continuous chanting, frenzied shaking of palm leaves, or the brandishing of a bolo alternated with the flipping of red pieces of cloth. Upon reaching a feverish climax, the balian stops, snaps out of her trance, and proceeds to give instructions dictated by the diwata to the people.

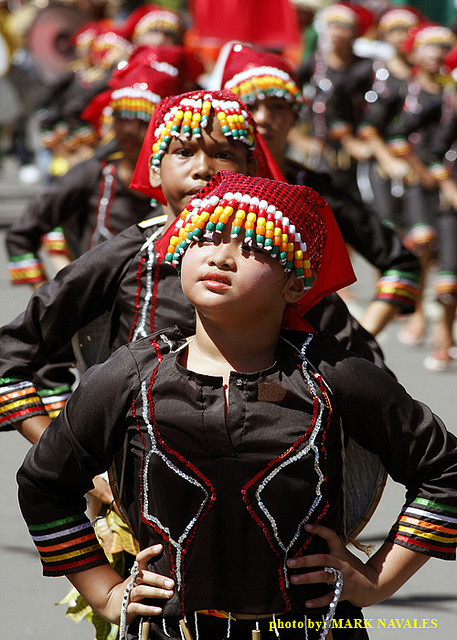
Subanon dance during colorful street dancing competition in Dapitan

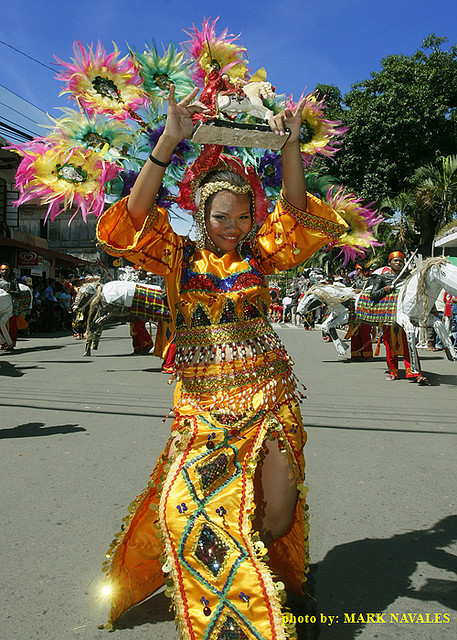
A Subanon lead dancer carrying St. James image during the Kinabayo Festival

Dance among the Subanon fulfills a multitude of ceremonial and ritual functions. Most important of the ritual dances is the buklog which is performed on a platform at least 6–10 meters above the ground. The most expensive ritual of the Subanon, the buklog is held to commemorate a dead person, so that his acceptance into the spirit world may be facilitated, or to give thanks for a bountiful harvest, or to ask for such a harvest as well as other favors from the diwata.

The whole structure of the buklog platform sways and appears to be shaky, but it is supported at the corners by upright posts. In the middle of the platform, a paglaw (central pole) passes through, with its base resting on a durugan, a hollow log 3 meters long and as thick as a coconut trunk which is laid horizontally on the ground, resting on a number of large empty earthen jars sunk into the earth. These jars act as resonators when the paglaw strikes the durugan. The jars are kept from breaking by means of sticks and leaves, protecting them from the durugan's impact. The sound that the paglaw makes is a booming one, and can be heard for kilometers around.

In a typical performance of the buklog, gongs are beaten, songs rendered (both traditional ones and those which are improvized for the occasion), and the people take turns sipping basi or rice beer from the reeds placed in the jars. As evening comes, and all through the night, they proceed to the buklog platform by ladder or notched log, and join hands in a circle. They alternately close in and jump backward around the central pole, and as they press down hard on the platform in unison, they cause the lower end of the pole to strike the hollow log, which then makes a deep booming sound. It is only the balian who appears serious in her communication with the spirit world, while all the rest are more concerned with merrymaking—drinking, feasting, and dancing.

The balian does the dancing in other ceremonies, e.g., for the recovery of a sick child. During the ritual offering of chicken, an egg, a chew of betel nut, a saucer of cooked rice, and a cigarette made of tobacco wrapped with nipa leaf, the shaman burns incense, beats a china bowl with a stick, beats a small gong called agun cina (Chinese gong), with the purpose of inviting the diwata mogolot(a class of deities who live in the sea) to share in the repast. Then she takes hold of salidingan in each hand—these are bunches of long strips of the salidingan or anahaw leaves—and dances seven times around the altar.

In the puluntuh—a buklog held in memory of the dead—two altars are constructed, one underneath the dancing platform, another near it. These are for the male and female munluh. The munluh are also the manamat, maleficient beings of gigantic size who dwell in the deep forests. In the ceremonies, the munluh are invoked and given offerings so that they might keep away the other manamat from the festival. The balian dances three times around the altar and around the hollow log underneath the buklog platform, holding in one hand a knife and in the other a piece of wood and a leaf. The altar to the female munluh is served by two women balian who take turns in beating a bowl, burning incense, and dancing. Unlike the male shaman, they carry no knife or piece of wood. The male balian's dance differs from the female's. In the former, the dancer hops over the ground with a quick step. In the latter, there is hardly any movement of the feet. It is all hand movement and bodily gestures

Many other kinds of dance, some of them mimetic, showcase the lively spirit of Subanon ritual.

The soten is an all-male dance dramatizing the strength and stoic character of the Subanon male. It employs fancy movements, with the left hand clutching a wooden shield and the right hand shaking dried leaves of palm. In a manner of supplication, he calls the attention of the diwata with the sound of the leaves, believed to be the most beautiful and pleasing to the ears of those deities. The Subanon warrior, believing that he has caught the attention of the diwata who are now present, continues to dance by shaking his shield, manipulating it as though in mortal combat with unseen adversaries. The soten is danced to the accompaniment of music played on several blue and white Ming dynasty bowls, performed in syncopated rhythm by female musicians.

The diwata is a dance performed by Subanon women in Zamboanga del Norte before they set out to work in the swidden. In this dance, they supplicate the diwata for a bountiful harvest. The farmers carry baskets laden with grains. They dart in and out of two bamboo planting sticks laid on the ground, which are struck together in rhythmic cadence by the male dancers. The clapping sequence is similar to that of the tinikling or bamboo dance.

The lapal is a dance of the balian as a form of communication with the diwata, while the sot is a dance performed by Subanon men before going off to battle. The balae is a dance performed by young Subanon women looking for husbands. They whisk dried palm leaves, whose sound is supposed to please the deities into granting their wishes.

The pangalitawao is a courtship dance of the Subanon of Zamboanga del Sur, usually performed during harvest time and in other social occasions. Traditional costumes are worn, with the women holding shredded banana leaves in each hand, while the men hold a kalasay in their right hand.

The change in steps is syncopated. The women shake their banana leaves downward, while the men strike the kalasay against the palm of their hand and against the hip. A drum or a gong is used to accompany the dancing. The sinalimba is an extraordinary dance which makes use of a swing that can accommodate three to four persons at a time. The term is also used to mean the swing itself, a representation of a mythic vessel used for journeying. Several male dancers move in rhythm to the music of a gong and drum ensemble, which are played beside the swinging sinalimba. At a given precise movement, one of them leaps onto the platform, steadies himself, and moves with the momentum of the swing. Once he finds his balance, he forces the sinalimba to swing even higher. This requires considerable skill, since he has to remain gracefully upright, moving in harmony with the sinalimba as though he were a part of it. The other two or three performers follow him onto the sinalimba one after the other, making sure they do not disrupt the pendular rhythm of the swing. A miscue could disrupt the motion, and even throw them off the platform. Even as they end the dance, they must maintain their agility in alighting from the sinalimba without counteracting or disrupting the direction of the swing.
