= Davao Metro Shuttle =

Bus company in the Philippines

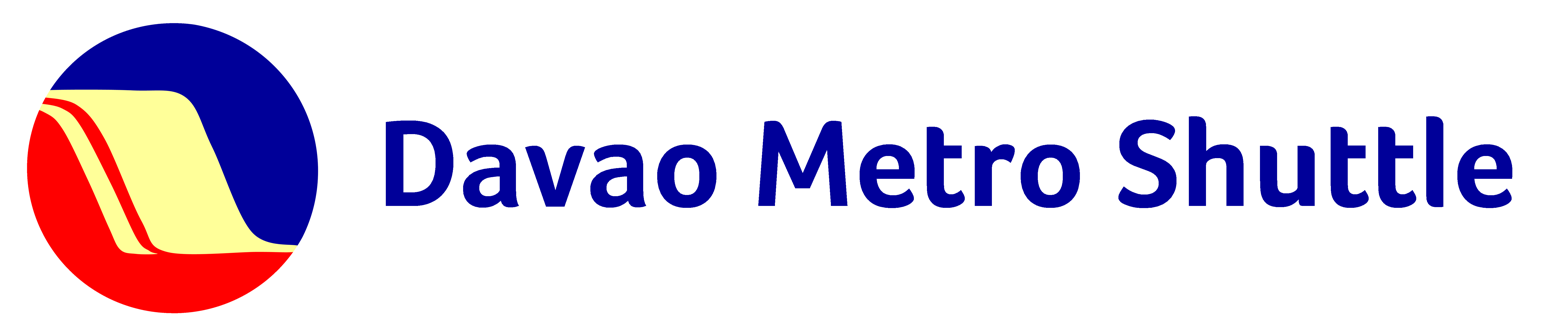

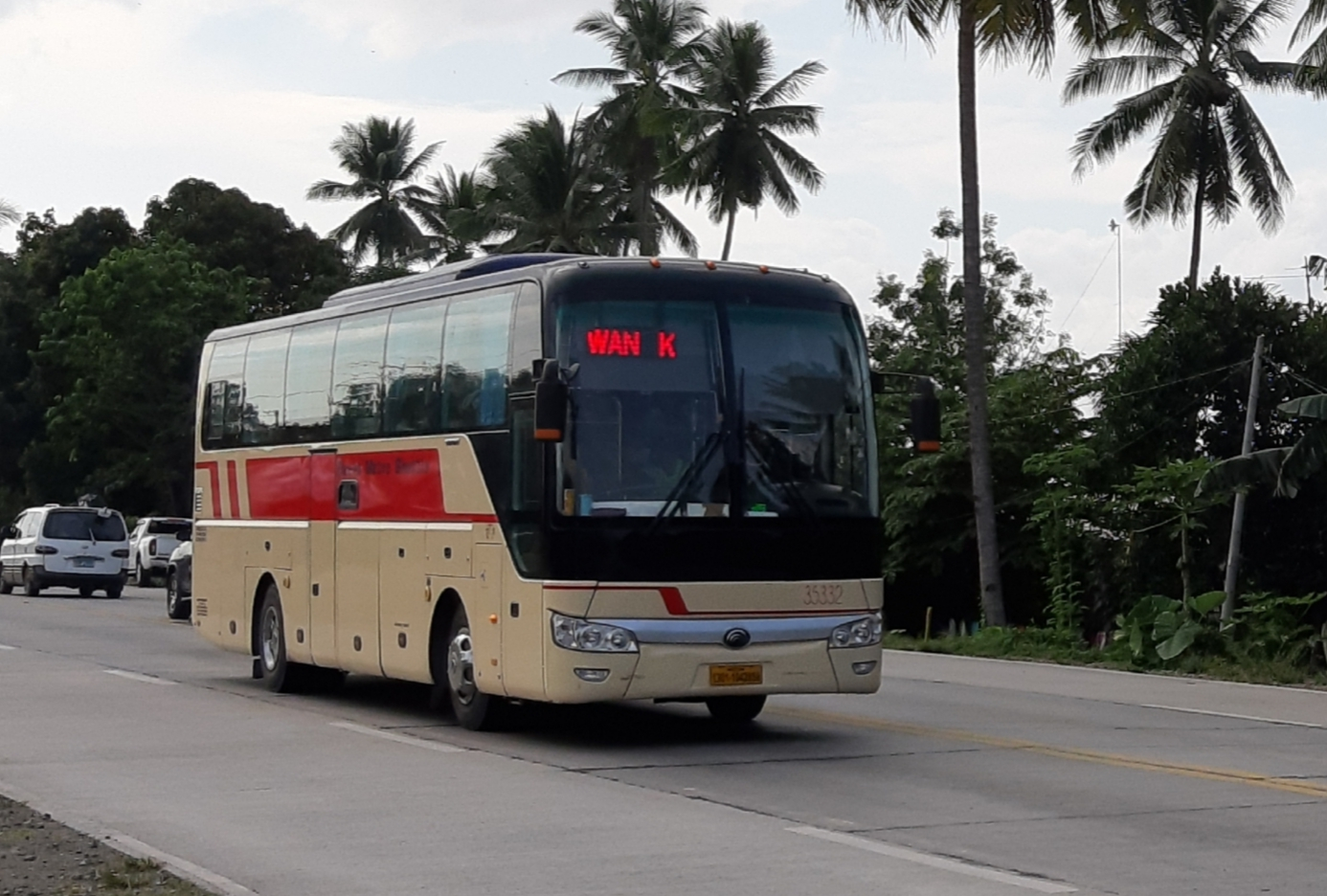
- A Davao Metro Shuttle bus on the way to Kidapawan
- Founded: 1995; 31 years ago
- Commenced operation: 1996 (Bus)
- Headquarters: Ecoland Drive, Matina, Davao City, Mindanao, Philippines
- Service area: Mindanao, Leyte & Metro Manila
- Service type: City & Provincial Operation
- Alliance: Go-Mindanao Tour Bus (subsidiary); Annil Transport (subsidiary)
- Fleet: 300+ units in total 180 units in Davao Region and Soccsksargen; 60 units in Caraga; 30 units in Eastern Visayas; 30 units in Go-Mindanao Tour Bus subsidiary
- Daily ridership: 25,000+
- Operator: Davao Metro Shuttle Corporation
- President: Emerald Uy
- Website: davaometroshuttle.com

Davao Metro Shuttle Corporation (DMS), also known as Davao Metro Shuttle Bus Company, Inc., is a bus company in Mindanao, Philippines. It operates bus transport services in and outside Davao Region with its headquarters, main garage and offices in Davao City. Its main terminals are located in Davao City and Tagum.

== History ==
Davao Metro Shuttle started as a local taxi service in 1995 serving the city of Davao in what has been a partnership between businessmen Rey T. Uy (who later went on to be mayor of Tagum) and Reynaldo Alba. When it procured its first air-conditioned bus units in 1996, its first service was the Davao-Digos route. In 1998 the company started servicing the Davao-Tagum route after purchasing 20 non-aircon bus units. In 1998 their range of service once again expanded when they started servicing the Davao-Kidapawan route using Daewoo buses.

As time went on, and as the company went cycles of financial setbacks and recovery, its service routes expanded greatly on time to include Bansalan, Malita, Monkayo, Compostela, New Bataan, & Laak.

The Davao Metro shuttle is set to launch the Go-Mindanao Tour Bus program in 2017, an initiative supported by the Department of Tourism. They are targeting to launch the route by March next year which would initially travel from the city to Bukidnon, Cagayan de Oro and Butuan.

On 2 August 2017 the company started servicing the Davao-Butuan-Nasipit route for the first time using Guilin Daewoo buses. Shortly thereafter the company's Go-Mindanao Tour Bus program officially commenced operation as a few of its units, specifically high-deck buses procured from Zhengzhou Yutong Bus covered with stickers of the Go-Mindanao Tour Bus brand, started plying the Davao-Butuan and Davao-New Bataan routes.

On 8 November 2018 the company, under its Go-Mindanao Tour Bus subsidiary brand, started plying the Butuan-Bislig route using then newly acquired Golden Dragon luxury buses, marking the first instance that, although the company bears the namesake of the city and the situate region it was mainly serving and based from, the company served completely outside its main areas of operation.

On 15 June 2022, the company entered the Davao-Manila overland route, marking the first time it serviced areas in Luzon and finally entered service in all three major Philippine island groups.

Its service area within Davao Region once again expanded in July 2023 when the company entered the Davao-Compostela-Cateel-Boston route with 18 buses in total plying vice versa. The next year on 13 March 2024, it also entered the Davao-Cateel-Baganga route with 17 bus units.

== Fleet ==
The first bus units of Davao Metro Shuttle came from Nissan Diesel and Daewoo Bus. Later, they also have units from Hino. In 2008 they purchased units from Xiamen Golden Dragon Bus, the first in Mindanao, and in 2010 they purchased units from Zhengzhou Yutong Bus.

To date, the fleet of Davao Metro Shuttle is composed of buses and minibuses acquired from Yutong, Golden Dragon, Hino, Daewoo, Nissan Diesel, Hyundai and Volvo. The company was also the first in the Philippines to field buses from Vietnamese bus bodybuilder THACO acquired in year 2020.

Currently, the company is the largest indigenous bus company in Mindanao, possessing more than 200 bus units including from its Go-Mindanao subsidiary.

Buses of Davao Metro Shuttle in Davao City

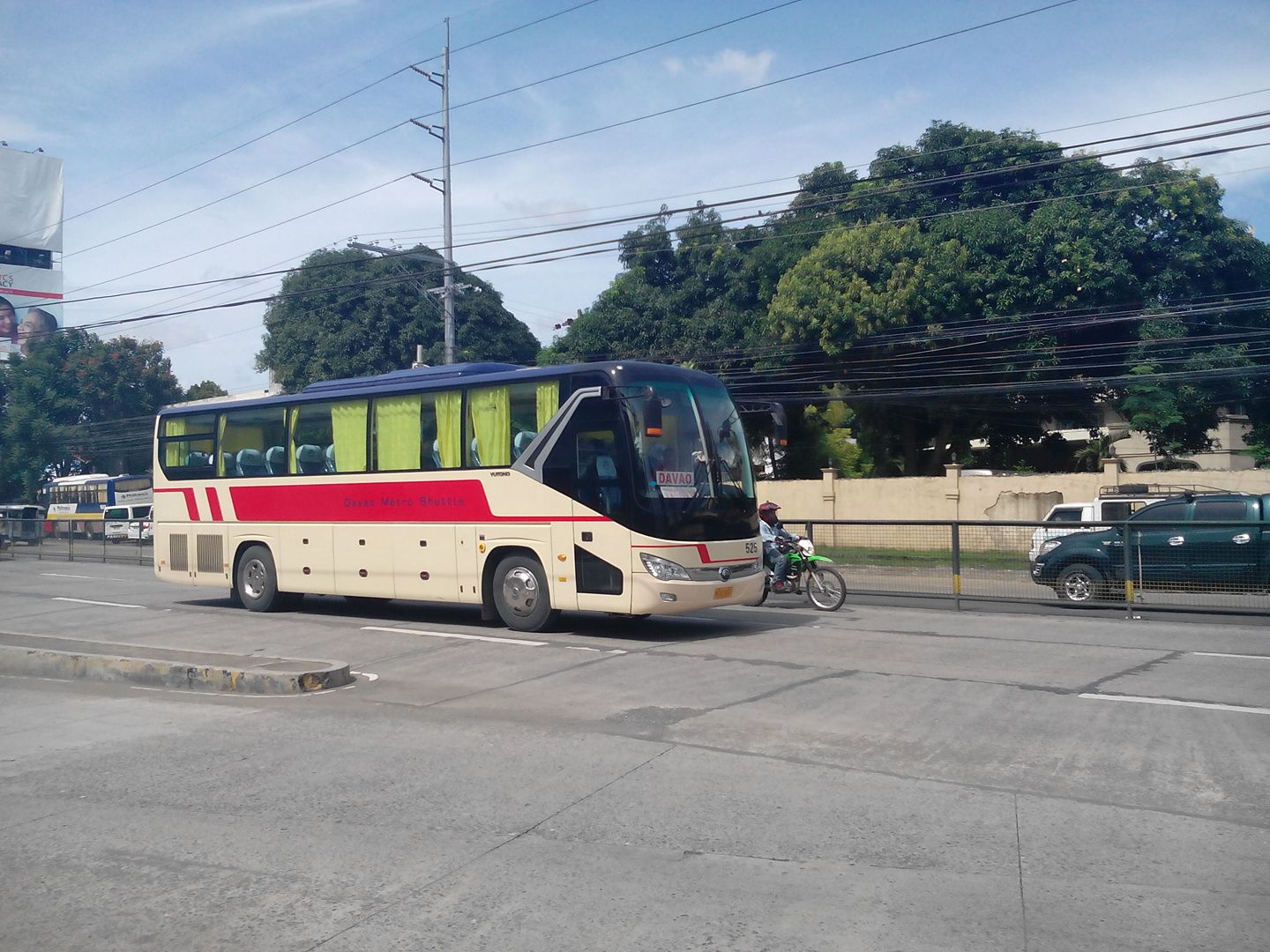
Yutong ZK6119HA

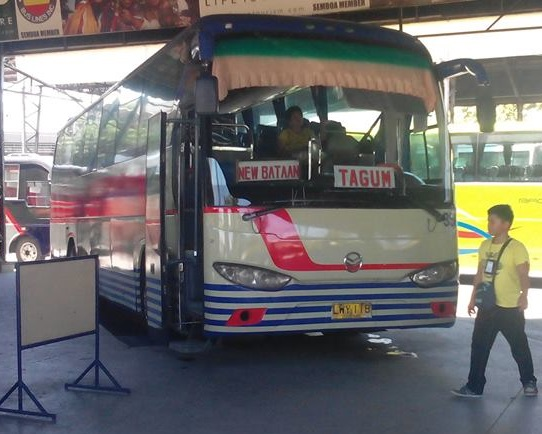
Golden Dragon XML6127 Marcopolo Series 2

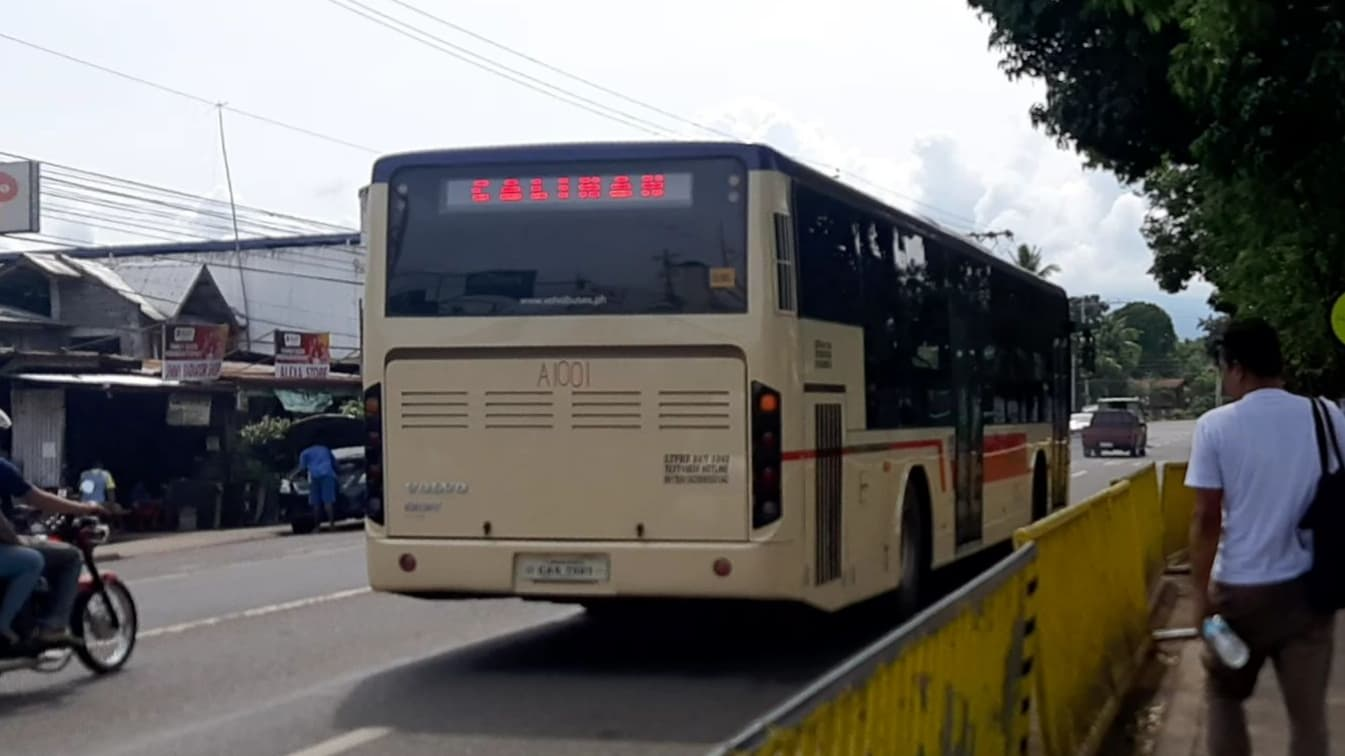
Volvo B8RLE city bus, under Annil Transport subsidiary brand

== Subsidiaries ==
=== Go Mindanao Tour Bus ===
Davao Metro Shuttle launched the Go-Mindanao Tour Bus program in 2017, an initiative supported by the Department of Tourism. The bus route highlights routes passing through tourist spots along Bukidnon to Butuan. Currently, all of its units ply the Davao - Butuan route and the Davao - Malita route.

=== Annil Transport ===
Davao Metro Shuttle bought and acquired the local city liner Annil Transport from its parent company Yellow Bus Line in September 2019, integrating its operations and therefore expanding its shuttle service area within the city. It has an intra-city bus routes that serves Calinan District to Roxas Avenue and Bankerohan in Davao City. Apart from two 2 units of Volvo B8RLE with the bodies of the bus manufactured by Autodelta Coach Builders based in Bataan, it also operates other units from Yutong and Higer Bus that Annil Transport previously operated prior to its acquisition by DMS.

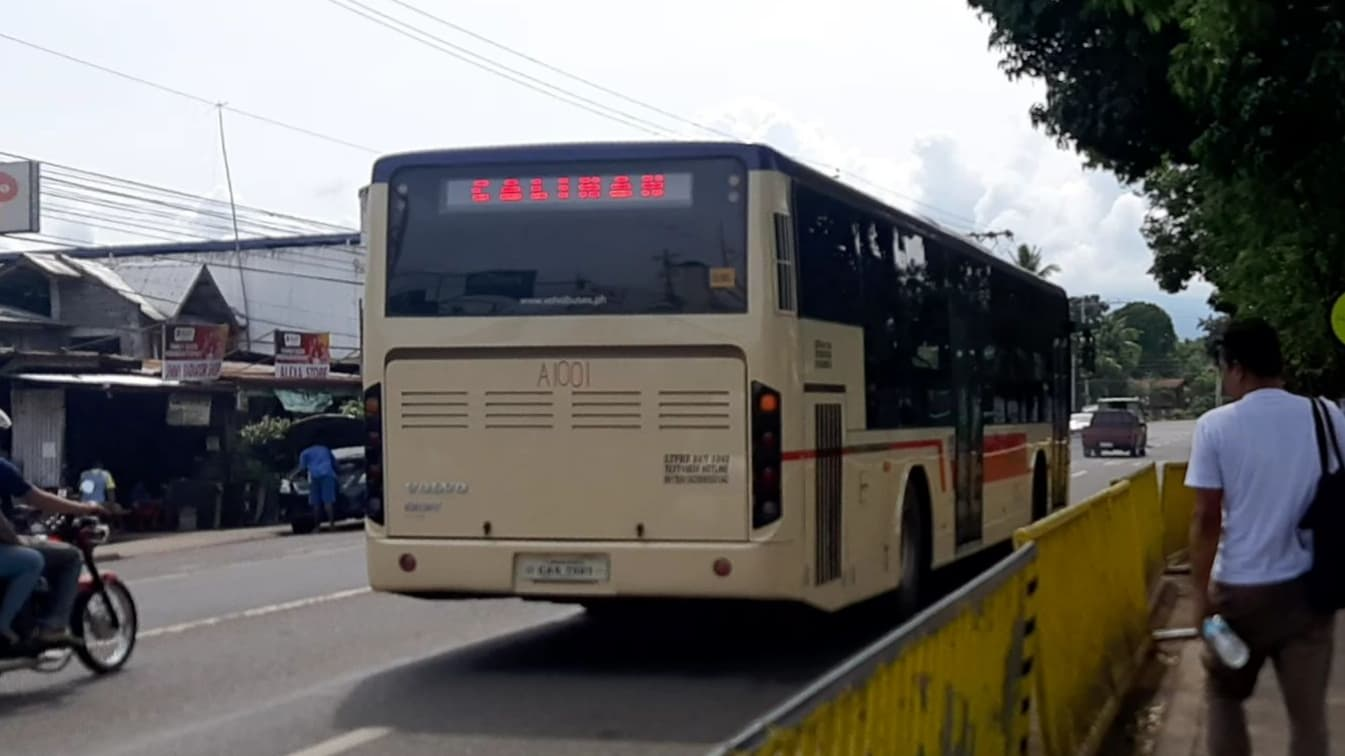
Annil's Volvo B8RLE

== Destinations ==
Despite its name, Davao Metro Shuttle not only serves the Metro Davao area. The company also operates routes in other parts of Mindanao, the Visayas and Luzon.

=== Davao Region ===
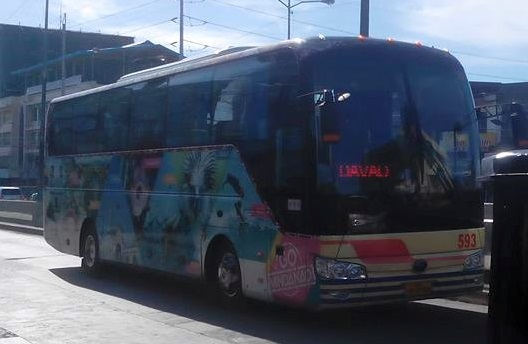
A Davao Metro Shuttle—Go Mindanao Tour Bus unit in Davao City.

Davao Region is the main and home operational area of Davao Metro Shuttle, with the overland transport terminals of the cities of Davao and Tagum serving as its main hubs. Also, the Davao-Tagum express route had its main hub and terminal at Ayala Abreeza Mall in J.P. Laurel St., Davao City.

Living up to its name, Davao Metro Shuttle also offers city shuttle routes within Davao City as part of the city's Peak-Hour Augmentation Bus Service program.

- Davao
- Tagum
- Digos
- Mati
- Panabo
- Compostela
- Laak
- Mawab
- Nabunturan
- New Bataan
- Maragusan
- Monkayo
- Montevista
- Pantukan
- Bansalan
- Matanao
- Hagonoy
- Padada
- Santa Cruz
- Sulop
- Malalag
- Asuncion
- Carmen
- Kapalong
- Sawata
- Talaingod
- Don Marcelino
- Jose Abad Santos
- Malita
- Sta. Maria
- Baganga
- Banaybanay
- Boston
- Cateel
- Lupon

=== Soccsksargen Region ===
Davao Metro Shuttle's Cotabato branch and garage is located in Bartolaba Subdivision, Barangay Lanao, Kidapawan City, Cotabato. While serving the area with its routes to the cities of Davao and Digos in Davao Region, locally it also serves the Kidapawan-Arakan route from its local hub in Kidapawan City Overland Terminal, Barangay Poblacion, Kidapawan City.

- Kidapawan
- Makilala
- Magpet
- Pres. Roxas
- Antipas
- Arakan

=== Caraga Region ===
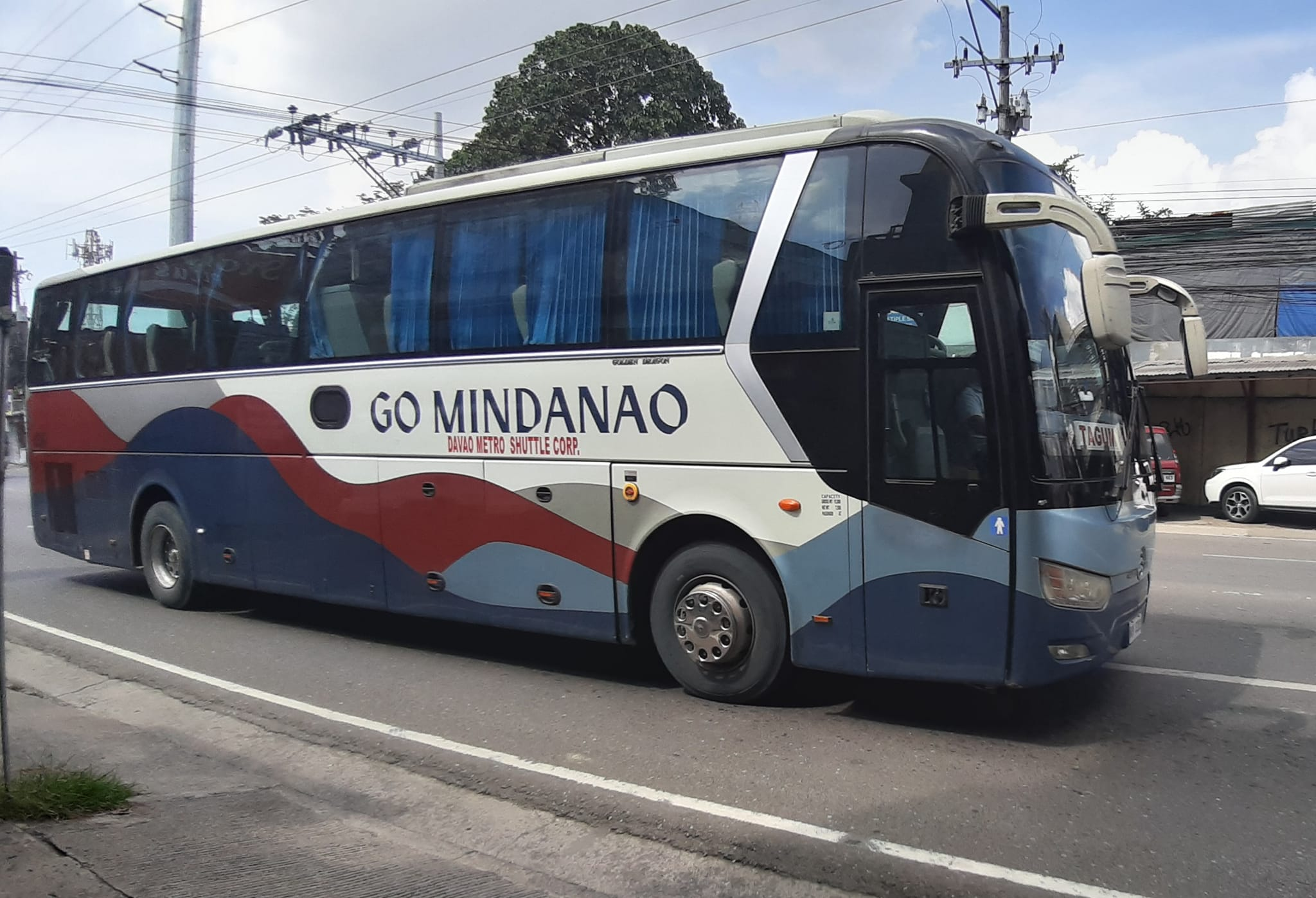
Go Mindanao Bus

Davao Metro Shuttle has its Caraga regional branch located in Barangay Bading, Butuan, Agusan del Norte. Destinations solely within Caraga region are mostly served by the company's tourist line subsidiary, Go-Mindanao Tour Bus.

- Butuan
- Bayugan
- Cabadbaran
- Surigao
- Jabonga
- Kitcharao
- Remedios T. Romualdez
- Santiago
- Tubay
- Bunawan
- Prosperidad
- San Francisco
- Sibagat
- Trento
- Alegria
- Mainit
- Placer
- Sison
- Tubod

=== Eastern Visayas ===
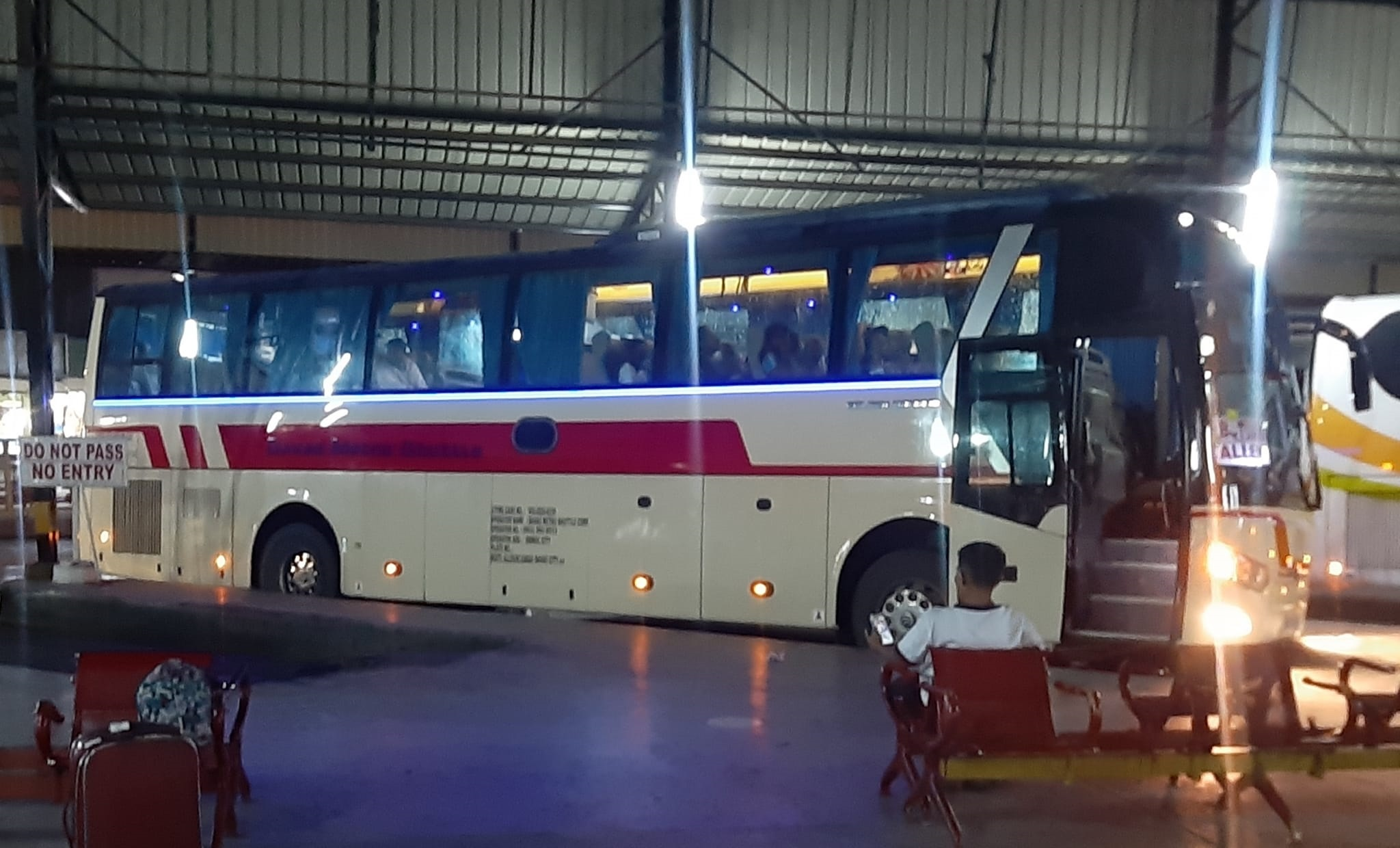
One of Davao Metro Shuttle's Golden Dragon buses serving Davao-Allen via Tacloban.

The entrance of Davao Metro Shuttle in Leyte on 5 July 2019 marked the first time the company ventured outside its main areas of operation in Mindanao and the second time the company operated outside its home operational area at Davao Region. Its Eastern Visayas branch office is located at War Veterans Avenue, Ormoc City, Leyte.

- Biliran
- Ormoc
- Tacloban
- Calbayog
- Maasin
- Sogod
- Naval
- Allen
- Abuyog
- Albuera
- Bato
- Baybay
- Catbalogan
- Dulag
- Hilongos
- Hindang
- Inopacan
- Bontoc
- Calbiga
- Gandara
- Hinabangan
- Javier
- Jiabong
- Liloan
- Mahaplag
- MacArthur
- Mayorga
- Motiong
- Pagsanghan
- Palo
- Paranas
- Pinabacdao
- Pintuyan
- San Isidro
- San Francisco
- San Ricardo
- Santa Rita
- Tanauan
- Tarangnan
- Tolosa
- Victoria

=== Luzon ===
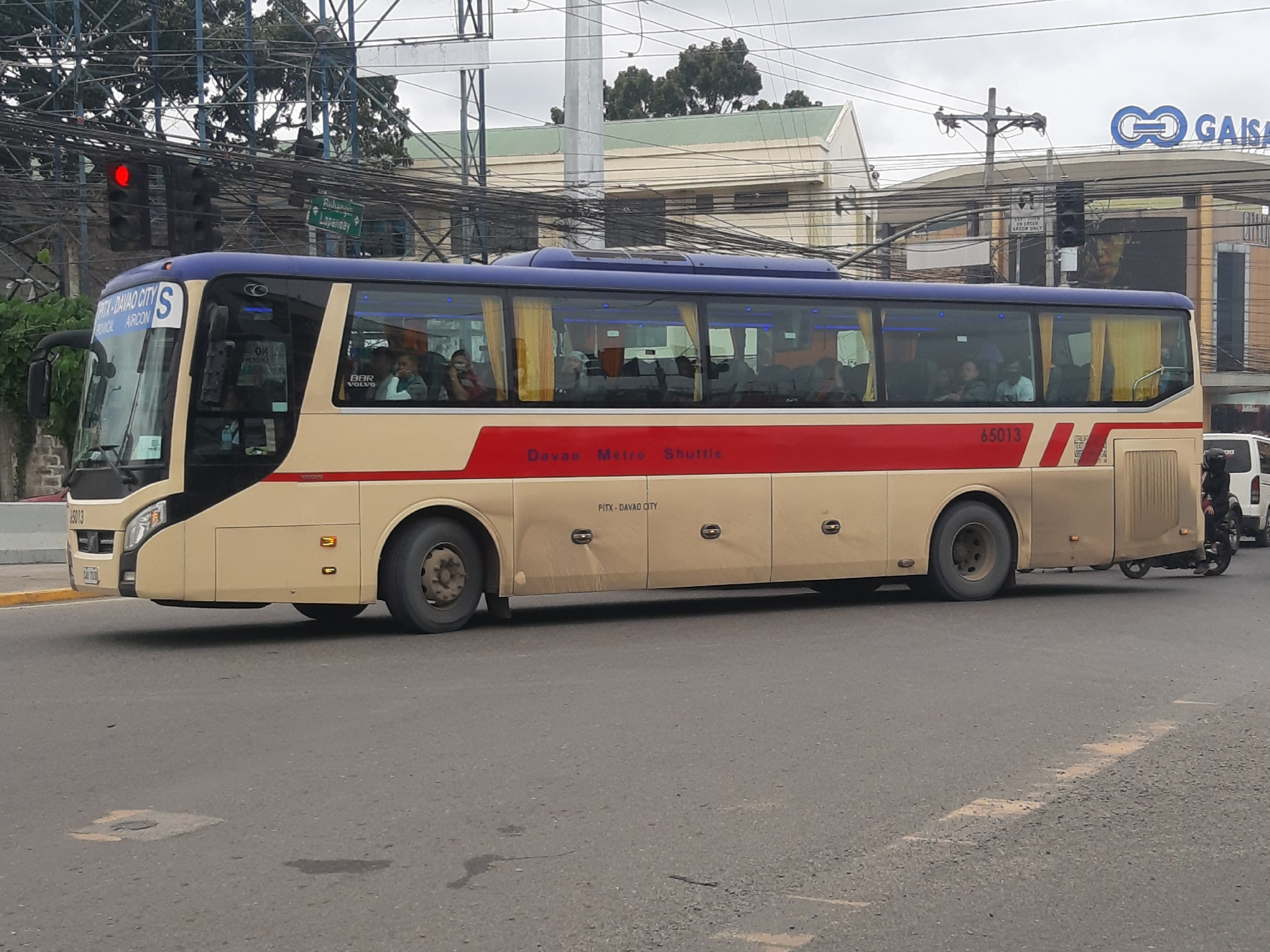
One of Davao Metro Shuttle's Volvo B8R buses plying the Davao-Metro Manila/PITX route in Davao City.

Davao Metro Shuttle acquired the Davao-Manila route via Land Transportation Franchising and Regulatory Board Resolution No. 2019–039 in early 2021. It launched the said route on 15 June 2022 with 15 bus units acquired from THACO with the inauguration held at Parañaque Integrated Terminal Exchange (PITX) in Metro Manila, marking the first time the company rendered service within Metro Manila and Luzon and serving an inter-island overland route that spanned Luzon, Visayas and Mindanao which is the longest overland bus route in the Philippines.

- Metro Manila (Parañaque Integrated Terminal Exchange)
- Bacoor
- Calamba (Turbina)
- Pagbilao
- Alabang, Muntinlupa (Metro Manila Skyway)
- Sto. Tomas
- Lucena
- Tagkawayan
- GMA
- Carmona
- Santa Rosa
- Naga
- Daraga/Legazpi
- Sorsogon
- Matnog
- Cubao (Quezon City)
- Santa Elena (Tabugon)
- Lupi
- Donsol

== See also ==
- Mindanao Star
- Ceres Transport
- Philtranco
- Yellow Bus Line
- List of bus companies of the Philippines
