= 2016 Kidapawan protests =

2016 protests in the Philippines

- Date: March 29 — April 1, 2016
- Location: Davao–Cotabato Road, Kidapawan, Cotabato, Philippines
- Caused by: Drought caused by El Niño phenomena
- Goals: Seek relief from the government
- Methods: Road blockade
- Result: Demonstrations violently dispersed

Parties
Local Governments: Cotabato Provincial Government; Kidapawan City Government; Government agencies: Philippine National Police; Dept. of Social Welfare and Development	Farmer protesters Joined by: Anakpawis; Bayan Muna; League of Filipino Students; GABRIELA; Kilusang Magbubukid ng Pilipinas; United Methodist Church (post-protest refuge and aid)

Lead figures
Emmylou Taliño-Mendoza (Governor of Cotabato); Joseph Evangelista (Mayor of Kidapawan); Alexander Tagum (PNP)	Norma Capuyan (Leader of the Farmer's group) Ciriaco Q. Francisco

Number
	3,000–6,000

Casualties and losses
99 injured	3 dead 116 injured 88 missing

For three days from March 30, 2016, thousands of farmers and their supporters blockaded the Davao–Cotabato Road in Kidapawan, Cotabato, in the Philippines. A day before prior to the road blockade, 500 farmers protested in front of the National Food Authority Office in Kidapawan to air their grievances. The demonstration ended violently with at least three deaths on the side of the protesters and a total of 116 injured on both sides after the police dispersed the mass action.

== Background ==
The protesters cited the drought caused by El Niño that has been affecting the region since November 2015 and the non-distribution of rice by the National Food Authority despite the declaration of a state of calamity by the local government unit.

Among the demands set by the protesters was 15,000 sacks of rice which they said Cotabato Governor Emmylou Taliño-Mendoza previously promised to give as a form of relief, seeds of vegetables resistant to drought and other relief against hunger.

More than 300,000 hectares (740,000 acres) of agricultural lands had been affected by the drought according to the Department of Agriculture with about ₱5.3 billion worth of rice and corn lost as a result of the calamity.

== Protesters ==
The number of people who participated in the protests ranged from 3,000 to 6,000 protesters composing of farmers affected by droughts and their supporters. The Philippine National Police (PNP) gave an estimate of about 3,000 participants, while protest organizers gave a figure of 5,000 protesters.

According to Cotabato Governor Emmylou Taliño-Mendoza, groups outside the province, namely Anakpawis, Bayan Muna, League of Filipino Students, Gabriela, and the Kilusang Magbubukid ng Pilipinas joined to support the protesting farmers. It was also reported that some of the farmers involved were from outside the province, and that they were told that they would be receiving rice from the governor of Cotabato.

According to local town municipals farmers from the municipalities of Arakan, Antipas, Magpet, Makilala and Tulunan joined the demonstrations to attract the media's attention.

== Events ==
Five hundred farmers went in front of the National Food Authority office in Kidapawan on March 29, 2016, to begin a protest saying that they were suffering from hunger, and that they had no income due to the El Niño phenomenon. Cotabato Governor Emmylou Taliño-Mendoza talked with the farmers, and the names of the farmers were sent to the local government unit so that they could be given rice rations and other benefits from the calamity fund of the province.

On March 30, 2016, around 6 a.m. (PST), some 6,000 farmers and their supporters began to gather at the Davao–Cotabato Road in Kidapawan, Cotabato, to set up a road blockade. As the protesters aired their grievances, they rendered the road impassible to thousands of motorists for three days. The police were also deployed in an attempt to negotiate with the protesters. Bai Alil Indayla, chairperson Gabriela Mindanao said that the protesters were suspicious of the police, and they questioned the PNP's attempts to engage open negotiations. Indayla further said that the police were ready to dismantle the barricade set up by the protesters.

According to Kidapawan Mayor Joseph Evangelista, Governor Taliño-Mendoza was scheduled to have a dialogue with the farmers at the city hall in the evening of March 30, but none of the farmers came for the talks. The farmers would block more portions of the highway until the government officials spoke to them.

When the protesters demanded 15,000 sacks of rice previously promised by Mendoza, she reportedly refused to give in to the demands, and clarified that the rice assistance from the provincial government was intended only for resident farmers of the province.

On 10:00 a.m. PST of April 1, 2016, the farmer-demonstrators' permit to rally expired. On the same day, the police, led by security personnel under Sr. Supt. Alexander Tagum, along with personnel from the Department of Social Welfare and Development conducted operations to clear the highway. They were tasked to act "upon guidance from Governor Mendoza". The goal of the clearing operation was reportedly to rescue minors who participated in the protests. The minors were reportedly used as human shield by protesters, led by Mindanao-based officials of the Kilusang Magbubukid ng Pilipinas.

At 10:30 a.m., the incident started when the police tried to disperse the protesting farmers. The PNP report said that the police were attacked with poles, pieces of wood, and large rocks by protesters before the police could commence their operation. A fire truck was deployed in the area. According to Norma Capuyan, the leader of the farmer's group, the PNP tried to disperse the protesters with water cannons before the police opened fire. Capuyan said that she and her fellow protesters ran into a church compound that was later surrounded by the police.

The protests ended violently with 3 farmers dead. Both sides sustained injuries.

Some of the protesters took refuge in nearby Spottswood Methodist Center, a Methodist church. The Mayor of Kidapawan notified the church's Board of Trustees on April 1, 2016, that the city government might revoke the church's permit to operate, due to harboring the protesters whom the city government deemed to have unlawfully blockaded the highway a few days ago.

== Casualties and arrests ==
The PNP reported on April 2, 2016, that 99 of its personnel involved were injured, with one in critical condition. The PNP also stated that 2 of the protesters died and 10 were injured. The PNP acknowledged that the protester-casualty figures given were based on those who sought medical attention from the police, and that these figures did not include injured protesters who did not seek medical attention from government units.

Kilab reported that 3 protesters died, while Anakpawis reported that there were 116 people injured and 88 who went missing. Prior to Anakpawis' report, the Children's Rehabilitation Center reported that 87 persons, including 6 children, went missing. Kilusang Magbubukid ng Pilipinas Southern Mindanao chair reported that at least 9 of the injuries were from gunshots.

Some of the protesters were arrested by the PNP, including an alleged commander of the New People's Army from Barangay Basak in the town of Magpet, Cotabato.

The PNP formally filed cases of economic sabotage, illegal assembly, harassment and obstruction to traffic flow before the Cotabato's Prosecutorial Office against 43 people who were arrested for their involvement in the violent protest.

== Reactions ==
Malacanang issued a statement through PCDSPO undersecretary, Manolo Quezon calling for an impartial investigation of the incident saying that "There is no reason why people must die in order to be asking for assistance from their own government" and urged the public not to "rush into judgment" pending an investigation. Cotabato Governor Emmylou Taliño-Mendoza said she was taking "full responsibility" for the incident.

All presidential candidates of the 2016 Philippine elections, Jejomar Binay, Miriam Defensor Santiago, Rodrigo Duterte, Grace Poe, and Mar Roxas issued statements condemning the violent dispersal of the protests. In addition, Poe and Santiago recognized the rights of the protesters to organize demonstrators and Duterte condemned the administration of Benigno Aquino III and called for action regarding the incident. Roxas called for investigations to determine the true cause of the incident.

Sarangani representative and senatorial candidate Manny Pacquiao, also condemned the encounter and paid condolences to the families that were affected in the incident.

On April 2, 2016, movie actor Robin Padilla flew to Kidapawan to meet-up with the farmer-protesters and visit the warehouse, where he brought 200 sacks of rice that was given for them. People and entrepreneurs from Davao City and nearby places, also arranged a rice donation drive for the protesting farmers.

Residents gathered at the Cotabato provincial capitol ground for a prayer rally on morning of April 4, three days after the dispersal of protesters.

=== Social media ===
Those who expressed their solidarity with the protesters, as well as those calling for justice for the incident, used the hashtag #BigasHindiBala (Rice not Bullets) on social media. On Twitter, the hashtag received about 63.5 million impressions from around 1:00 p.m. to 10 p.m. PST of April 2, 2016. The phrase "Bigas Hindi Bala" was still used by the protesting farmer groups under the administration of Rodrigo Duterte.

=== Hacking incidents ===
One day after the dispersal of the protesting farmers, two government websites of Cotabato were taken down by alleged hackers. On its Facebook page, Anonymous Philippines claimed responsibility for the hacking with a "distributed denial-of-service attack" (DDOS attack).

== Investigations ==
A Senate Committee on Justice and Human Rights hearing on the incident will be conducted on April 8, 2016, at the University of Southeastern Philippines in Davao City, according to the committee chairman Sen. Aquilino Pimentel III.

As confirmed by P/Sr. Supt. Danilo Peralta, administrative head of PNP director, P/Sr. Supt. Alexander Tagum and Kidapawan police director P/Supt. John Calinga were relieved from their posts.

In June 2016, the Commission on Human Rights recommended the filing of criminal, civil, and administrative charges against police, government officials, and protest organizers. A CHR resolution stated, "Whatever violence may have come from the side of the protesters, there is no justifying the use by the Philippine National Police of firearms. It is clear that the PNP fired the first shot in a situation where they were not even supposed to bring guns... The principles of peaceful dispersal, negotiations and maximum tolerance prescribed under the PNP Operations Manual were not observed".
