= Legislative districts of Cotabato =

The legislative districts of Cotabato are the representations of the province of Cotabato in the various national legislatures of the Philippines. The province is currently represented in the lower house of the Congress of the Philippines through its first, second, and third congressional districts.

The provinces of South Cotabato (including the province of Sarangani and the highly urbanized city of General Santos), and Maguindanao (including the independent component city of Cotabato) and Sultan Kudarat last formed part of the province's representation in 1967 and 1972, respectively.

Since 2022, the legislative districts excludes municipalities from the Special Geographic Area of Bangsamoro.

== History ==
=== Prior to partition of Cotabato Province in 1966 ===
Initially being excluded from representation in the lower house of the Philippine Legislature in 1907, the then-non-Christian-majority areas of the Philippines — which included the Department of Mindanao and Sulu, of which the undivided province of Cotabato was part — were finally extended legislative representation with the passage of the Philippine Autonomy Act in 1916 by the United States Congress. The Revised Administrative Code (Act No. 2711) enacted on March 10, 1917, further elaborated on the manner by which these areas would be represented. The non-Christian areas were to be collectively represented in the upper house's 12th senatorial district by two senators, both appointed by the Governor-General. Five assembly members, also appointed by the Governor-General, were to represent the seven component provinces of Department of Mindanao and Sulu — Agusan, Bukidnon, Cotabato, Davao, Lanao, Sulu and Zamboanga — in the lower house as a single at-large district.

These arrangements remained in place despite the abolition of the Department in 1920. It lasted until 1935, when each of the seven provinces was provided one representative to the National Assembly of the Philippines, albeit the manner of election varying between provinces. Voters of the more Christianized provinces of Agusan, Bukidnon, Davao and Zamboanga could elect their representative through popular vote by virtue of Article VI, Section 1 of the 1935 Constitution. In the Muslim-dominated provinces of Cotabato, Lanao and Sulu, however, voter qualifications were more restrictive: the only persons allowed to vote for the province's representative were past and present municipal officials (municipal president, vice-president, municipal councilors); present senators, assembly representatives and 1935 Constitutional Convention delegates; provincial governors and members of provincial boards; and any persons currently residing in the concerned province who held any of the aforementioned positions in the past. This was the manner by which Cotabato's representative was elected in 1935.

The 1st National Assembly of the Philippines passed Commonwealth Act No. 44 on October 13, 1936, to finally give all qualified voters of Cotabato (along with Lanao and Sulu) the right to elect their own representatives through popular vote. Voters began to elect their representatives in this manner beginning in 1938.

During the Second World War, the undivided Province of Cotabato sent two delegates to the National Assembly of the Japanese-sponsored Second Philippine Republic: one was the provincial governor (an ex officio member), while the other was elected through a provincial assembly of KALIBAPI members during the Japanese occupation of the Philippines. Upon the restoration of the Philippine Commonwealth in 1945 the province retained its pre-war lone congressional district. Even after receiving its own city charter on June 20, 1959 Cotabato City remained part of the representation of the Province of Cotabato, per Section 91 of Republic Act No. 2634.

=== As the reduced Cotabato Province (1966–1973) ===
The enactment of Republic Act No. 4849 on June 18, 1966, reduced the territory of Cotabato Province with the separation of its southern municipalities to form the new province of South Cotabato. Pursuant to Section 5 of R.A. 4849, the incumbent representative of Cotabato began to represent only the remaining portion of the province (along with the chartered city of Cotabato) in the second half of the 6th Congress, following the election of South Cotabato's separate representative in a special election held on the same day as the 1967 senatorial elections.

=== As the current (North) Cotabato Province (1973–present) ===
On November 22, 1973, the reduced Cotabato Province was further subdivided into the provinces of Maguindanao, North Cotabato and Sultan Kudarat by virtue of Presidential Decree No. 341. All three successor provinces were represented in the Interim Batasang Pambansa as part of Region XII from 1978 to 1984. It was during this period that one of them — North Cotabato — was renamed Cotabato through Batas Pambansa Blg. 660.

The present-day (North) Cotabato Province returned two representatives, elected at-large, to the Regular Batasang Pambansa in 1984. Under the new Constitution which was proclaimed on February 11, 1987, the province was reapportioned into two congressional districts; each elected its member to the restored House of Representatives starting that same year.

The approval of Republic Act No. 10177 on September 14, 2012, increased the representation of (North) Cotabato by reapportioning the province into three legislative districts. The representatives for the newly reconfigured districts were first elected in the 2013 elections.

Despite the reallocation of 63 barangays of Cotabato to the Bangsamoro in early 2019 (later known as the Special Geographic Area or SGA), voters in that region are able to vote for local provincial positions including district representatives for the 2019 elections. However they were barred to do so by the Comelec in the 2022 elections.

== 1st District ==
- Municipalities: Alamada, Aleosan, Libungan, Midsayap, Pigcawayan, Pikit
- Population (2020): 398,953

Period	Representative
16th Congress; 2013–2016	Jesus N. Sacdalan
17th Congress; 2016–2019	Jesus N. Sacdalan
18th Congress; 2019–2022	Joselito S. Sacdalan
19th Congress; 2022–2025	Joselito S. Sacdalan

=== 1987–2013 ===
- Municipalities: Alamada, Aleosan, Banisilan, Carmen, Kabacan, Libungan, Midsayap, Pigcawayan, Pikit

Period	Representative
8th Congress; 1987–1992	Rodrigo B. Gutang
9th Congress; 1992–1995	Anthony P. Dequiña
10th Congress; 1995–1998	Anthony P. Dequiña
11th Congress; 1998–2001	Anthony P. Dequiña
12th Congress; 2001–2004	Emmylou J. Taliño-Mendoza
13th Congress; 2004–2007	Emmylou J. Taliño-Mendoza
14th Congress; 2007–2010	Emmylou J. Taliño-Mendoza
15th Congress; 2010–2013	Jesus N. Sacdalan

== 2nd District ==
- City: Kidapawan
- Municipalities: Antipas, Arakan, Magpet, Makilala, President Roxas
- Population (2020): 432,405

Period	Representative
16th Congress; 2013–2016	Nancy A. Catamco
17th Congress; 2016–2019	Nancy A. Catamco
18th Congress; 2019–2022	Rudy S. Caoagdan
19th Congress; 2022–2025	Rudy S. Caoagdan

=== 1987–2013 ===
- City: Kidapawan (became city 1998)
- Municipalities: Antipas, Magpet, Makilala, Matalam, M'lang, President Roxas, Tulunan, Arakan (established 1991)

Period	Representative
8th Congress; 1987–1992	Gregorio A. Andolana
9th Congress; 1992–1995	Gregorio A. Andolana
10th Congress; 1995–1998	Gregorio A. Andolana
11th Congress; 1998–2001	Gregorio T. Ipong
12th Congress; 2001–2004	Gregorio T. Ipong
13th Congress; 2004–2007	Gregorio T. Ipong
14th Congress; 2007–2010	Bernardo F. Piñol, Jr.
15th Congress; 2010–2013	Nancy A. Catamco

== 3rd District ==
- Municipalities: Banisilan, Carmen, Kabacan, Matalam, M'lang, Tulunan
- Population (2020): 443,827

Period	Representative
16th Congress; 2013–2016	Jose I. Tejada
17th Congress; 2016–2019	Jose I. Tejada
18th Congress; 2019–2022	Jose I. Tejada
19th Congress; 2022–2025	Ma. Alana Samantha T. Santos
20th Congress; 2025–2028	Ma. Alana Samantha T. Santos

== Lone District (defunct) ==
=== 1935–1967 ===
- encompasses present-day provinces of Cotabato, Maguindanao, Sarangani, Sultan Kudarat and South Cotabato, and the independent cities of Cotabato and General Santos

Period	Representative
1st National Assembly; 1935–1938	Datu Balabaran Sinsuat
2nd National Assembly; 1938–1941	Ugalingan Piang
1st Commonwealth Congress; 1945	Ugalingan Piang
1st Congress; 1946–1949	Gumbay Piang
2nd Congress; 1949–1953	Datu Blah T. Sinsuat (Note: Only took oath of office on January 3, 1950.)
3rd Congress; 1953–1957	Luminog Datu Mangelen
4th Congress; 1957–1961	Salipada K. Pendatun (Note: Elected for a third term in 1965 as representative for the undivided province of Cotabato; began to serve as the representative of the reduced Cotabato province beginning in the second half of the 6th Congress, after the election of a separate representative for South Cotabato, pursuant to R.A. 4849.)
5th Congress; 1961–1965	Salipada K. Pendatun
6th Congress; 1965–1969	Salipada K. Pendatun
6th Congress; 1965–1969	see 1968–1972

=== 1968–1972 ===
- encompasses present-day provinces of Cotabato, Maguindanao and Sultan Kudarat, and the independent city of Cotabato

Period	Representative
6th Congress; 1965–1969	see 1935–1967
6th Congress; 1965–1969	Salipada K. Pendatun (Note: Elected in 1965 as representative for the undivided province of Cotabato; began to serve as the representative of the reduced Cotabato province beginning in the second half of the 6th Congress, after the separate representative for South Cotabato took office, pursuant to R.A. 4849. For the 7th Congress: only took oath of office as representative on July 29, 1970, following a legal battle over results of election contested by Datu Blah Sinsuat.)
7th Congress; 1969–1972	Salipada K. Pendatun

== At-Large (defunct) ==
=== 1943–1944 ===
- encompasses present-day provinces of Cotabato, Maguindanao, Sarangani, Sultan Kudarat and South Cotabato, and the independent cities of Cotabato and General Santos

Period	Representatives
National Assembly; 1943–1944	Menandang Piang
National Assembly; 1943–1944	Alfonso A. Pablo (ex officio)

=== 1984–1986 ===
Period	Representatives
Regular Batasang Pambansa; 1984–1986	Tomas B. Baga, Jr.
Regular Batasang Pambansa; 1984–1986	Carlos B. Cajelo

== See also ==
- Legislative district of Mindanao and Sulu
- Legislative district of Sarangani
- Legislative districts of South Cotabato
  - Legislative district of General Santos
- Legislative districts of Sultan Kudarat
- Legislative district of Maguindanao del Norte
- Legislative district of Maguindanao del Sur
- Legislative districts of Maguindanao
