= Cotabato's 2nd congressional district =

Legislative district of the Philippines

- Constituency for the House of Representatives of the Philippines
- Map
- Location of Cotabato within the Philippines
- Province: Cotabato
- Region: Soccsksargen
- Population: 394,354 (2015)
- Electorate: 250,013 (2019)
- Major settlements: 6 LGUs: Cities; Kidapawan; Municipalities; Antipas; Arakan; Magpet; Makilala; President Roxas
- Area: 3,321.37 km^{2} (1,282.39 sq mi)

Current constituency
- Created: 1987
- Representative: Rudy S. Caoagdan
- Political party: Nacionalista
- Congressional bloc: Majority

Cotabato's 2nd congressional district is one of the three congressional districts of the Philippines in the province of Cotabato. It has been represented in the House of Representatives since 1987. The district covers eastern Cotabato bordering Bukidnon and Davao Region. It consists of the provincial capital city, Kidapawan, and the municipalities of Antipas, Arakan, Magpet, Makilala and President Roxas. Prior to redistricting in 2012, the district also included the municipalities of M'lang, Matalam and Tulunan. It is currently represented in the 20th Congress by Rudy S. Caoagdan of the Nacionalista.

== Representation history ==
#	Image	Member	Term of office		Congress	Party	Electoral history	Constituent LGUs
#	Image	Member	Start	End	Congress	Party	Electoral history	Constituent LGUs
=== Cotabato's 2nd district for the House of Representatives of the Philippines ===
District created February 2, 1987 from Cotabato's at-large district.
1		Gregorio A. Andolana	June 30, 1987	June 30, 1998	8th	Partido ng Bayan	Elected in 1987.	1987–1992; Antipas, Kidapawan, M'lang Magpet, Makilala, Matalam, President Roxas, Tulunan
1		Gregorio A. Andolana	June 30, 1987	June 30, 1998	9th	Lakas	Re-elected in 1992.	1992–2013; Antipas, Arakan, Kidapawan, M'lang Magpet, Makilala, Matalam, President Roxas, Tulunan
1		Gregorio A. Andolana	June 30, 1987	June 30, 1998	10th	Lakas	Re-elected in 1995.	1992–2013; Antipas, Arakan, Kidapawan, M'lang Magpet, Makilala, Matalam, President Roxas, Tulunan
2		Gregorio T. Ipong	June 30, 1998	June 30, 2007	11th	LAMMP	Elected in 1998.	1992–2013; Antipas, Arakan, Kidapawan, M'lang Magpet, Makilala, Matalam, President Roxas, Tulunan
2		Gregorio T. Ipong	June 30, 1998	June 30, 2007	12th	NPC	Re-elected in 2001.	1992–2013; Antipas, Arakan, Kidapawan, M'lang Magpet, Makilala, Matalam, President Roxas, Tulunan
2		Gregorio T. Ipong	June 30, 1998	June 30, 2007	13th	NPC	Re-elected in 2004.	1992–2013; Antipas, Arakan, Kidapawan, M'lang Magpet, Makilala, Matalam, President Roxas, Tulunan
3		Bernardo Piñol Jr.	June 30, 2007	June 30, 2010	14th	Lakas	Elected in 2007.	1992–2013; Antipas, Arakan, Kidapawan, M'lang Magpet, Makilala, Matalam, President Roxas, Tulunan
4		Nancy Catamco	June 30, 2010	June 30, 2019	15th	Liberal	Elected in 2010.	1992–2013; Antipas, Arakan, Kidapawan, M'lang Magpet, Makilala, Matalam, President Roxas, Tulunan
4		Nancy Catamco	June 30, 2010	June 30, 2019	16th	Liberal	Re-elected in 2013.	2013–present Antipas, Arakan, Kidapawan, Magpet, Makilala, President Roxas
4		Nancy Catamco	June 30, 2010	June 30, 2019	17th	PDP–Laban	Re-elected in 2016.	2013–present Antipas, Arakan, Kidapawan, Magpet, Makilala, President Roxas
5		Rudy Caogdan	June 30, 2019	Incumbent	18th	PDP–Laban	Elected in 2019.	2013–present Antipas, Arakan, Kidapawan, Magpet, Makilala, President Roxas
5		Rudy Caogdan	June 30, 2019	Incumbent	19th	Nacionalista	Re-elected in 2022.	2013–present Antipas, Arakan, Kidapawan, Magpet, Makilala, President Roxas
5		Rudy Caogdan	June 30, 2019	Incumbent	20th	Nacionalista	Re-elected in 2025.	2013–present Antipas, Arakan, Kidapawan, Magpet, Makilala, President Roxas

== Election results ==
=== 2025 ===
Candidate	Party	Votes	%
Rudy Caoagdan (incumbent)	Nacionalista Party	195,870	94.74
Greg Andolana	Independent	10,874	5.26
Total		206,744	100.00
Valid votes		206,744	88.05
Invalid/blank votes		28,053	11.95
Total votes		234,797	100.00
Registered voters/turnout		276,804	84.82
Nacionalista Party hold			
Source: Commission on Elections

=== 2010 ===
Philippine House of Representatives election at Cotabato's 1st district
Party	Candidate	Votes	%
Lakas–Kampi	Nancy Catamco	119,294	51.44
Liberal	Bernardo Piñol, Jr.	112,617	48.56
Valid ballots		231,911	97.20
Invalid or blank votes		6,691	2.80
Total votes		238,602	100.00
Lakas–Kampi gain from Liberal			

== See also ==
- Legislative districts of Cotabato
