= Elias J TV =

Filipino reggae musician

- Born: Elias Lintucan Jr. May 11, 2000 (age 26); Magpet, Cotabato, Philippines
- Genres: Reggae, Visayan music
- Occupations: Singer, dancer, content creator
- Years active: 2024–present
- Spouse: Abegail Cariquitan

Elias Gabonada Lintucan Jr. (born May 11, 2000) also known as Elias J TV is a Filipino reggae singer and content creator from Magpet, Cotabato. Lintucan is a popular local Facebook reggae artist and the main video entertainer on Facebook Live. He gained local attention due to his musical videos, the fact which leads his into travelling on several places around.

== Early life ==
Born and raised in Magpet, Cotabato May 11, 2000 Elias Gabonada Lintucan Jr’s parents are Nenita and Elias Lintucan Sr. Prior to pursuing a career in music he did nothing but help his father tap trees and get nuts to earn for schooling. He graduated from college in Criminology.

== Career ==
Lintucan began producing dance videos and sings along with videos that he posted to his Facebook page starting in 2025, using the name "Elias J TV". He is accompanied by members of Elias J. TV Band, the band in which he sings and whose music he identifies as tribal reggae from the Bisaya regions.

On Jan 2026, Elias J TV guested on Boy Abunda’s show Fast Talk which is airing on GMA Network. In March 2026, he was cast as a guest actor in the television series Encantadia Chronicles: Sang'gre.

Elias J TV has planned shows for its fans in United Arab Emirates on 9 January in Abu Dhabi and in Dubai on 11 January for the Filipino community.

He was meant to have a tour in the US in September 2025, but was canceled as a result of legal battle with his manager and also because of visa issues.

== Legal dispute ==
In August 2005, Lintucan and the rest of the band sued their manager Beverly Labadlabad at Kidapawan City Regional Trial Court. The legal battles meant a number of their concerts in their home state of New Jersey as well as their U.S. Gigs were called off, and in September 2025, a judge ruled in favor of Lintucan, granting him a preliminary injunction against the manager, banning him from representing the band.

In a press release issued days before the concert, Paduk Entertainment LLC announced that the tour had been postponed without giving any official explanation.

== Personal life ==
Elias J TV is hitched with a delightful spouse known as Abegail Cariquitan with whom he a youngster.

== Discography ==
- "Puhon" (2025)
- "Ohahay" (2025)
- "Lipad" (2025)
