= Bernardo Piñol Jr. =

Filipino politician and journalist

Member of the Philippine House of Representatives from Cotabato's 2nd district
- In office June 30, 2007 – June 30, 2010
- Preceded by: Gregorio Ipong
- Succeeded by: Nancy Catamco

Personal details
- Born: September 23, 1957 (age 69)
- Party: Independent (2012–present)
- Other political affiliations: Liberal (2010–2012); Lakas–CMD (2007–2010)

Bernardo Fantin Piñol Jr. (born September 23, 1957) is a Filipino politician and journalist. He was a member of the House of Representatives of the Philippines, representing the Second District of Cotabato from 2007 until 2010, when he was defeated in his re-election bid by Nancy Catamco. He is a brother of former Agriculture Secretary and former Cotabato Governor Emmanuel Piñol.

House of Representatives of the Philippines
Preceded by Gregorio Ipong	Representative, 2nd District of North Cotabato; 2007–2010	Succeeded by Nancy Catamco
