= Nancy Catamco =

Filipino politician

The Honorable Nancy Catamco
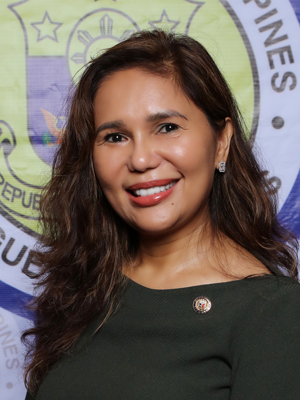

Chairperson of National Commission on Indigenous Peoples
- Incumbent
- Assumed office April 6, 2026
- Preceded by: Marie Grace T. Pascua

25th Governor of Cotabato
- In office June 30, 2019 – June 30, 2022
- Vice Governor: Emmylou Taliño-Mendoza
- Preceded by: Emmylou Taliño-Mendoza
- Succeeded by: Emmylou Taliño-Mendoza

Member of the House of Representatives from 2nd District of Cotabato
- In office June 30, 2010 – June 30, 2019
- Preceded by: Bernardo Piñol Jr.
- Succeeded by: Rudy Caoagdan

Personal details
- Born: Nancy Alaan Catamco; June 19, 1969 (age 57) Makilala, Cotabato, Philippines
- Party: PDP–Laban (2017–present)
- Other political affiliations: Liberal (2010–2017); Lakas (before 2010)

Nancy Alaan Catamco is a Filipina politician and the incumbent Chairperson of the National Commission on Indigenous Peoples. She was elected in 2019 as the 25th governor and the 3rd female governor of the province of Cotabato. She is also the 1st governor from the Indigenous Bagobo-Obo Manobo people. Catamco was a former member of the House of Representatives representing the 2nd Congressional District of the province of Cotabato for three consecutive terms (2010–2019).

== Political career ==
Representative of the 2nd Legislative District of the province of Cotabato (2010–2019)

Catamco was elected for three consecutive terms as representative of the 2nd Legislative District of Cotabato Province from 2010 to 2019.

As a congresswoman, Catamco was involved in the advocacy for the rights, interests, and concerns of Indigenous peoples in the House of Representatives. She fought to ensure the full implementation of Republic Act No. 8371 otherwise known as the Indigenous People's Rights Act 1997. She also pushed for the implementation of Indigenous Peoples Mandatory Representative in the councils of Cotabato Province and in all councils in the country.

During her term as representative, she authored and co-authored bills related to education, agriculture, labor, health, senior citizens, women and youth. She also filed bills in the House of Representatives related to Indigenous peoples.

== Suspension as governor ==
On July 4, 2019, the Supreme Court of the Philippines suspended Catamco as North Cotabato governor for 90 days as she was facing graft and malversation charges relating to allegedly supplying overpriced fertilizers to the town of Poro, Cebu in 2004. The Anti-Graft and Corrupt Practices Act mandates such preventative suspensions for any public official facing charges in the Sandiganbayan, to prevent the official from gaining an advantage from his government position.

Catamco was replaced by Vice Governor Emmylou Taliño-Mendoza from August 23, 2019, to November 21, 2019.

The Supreme Court ordered the Sandiganbayan to dismiss the graft case against her in July 2020.

== Personal life ==
Nancy Catamco was born in Barangay Saguing, Makilala, Cotabato, on June 19, 1969, and the 4th child of Proceso and Minda Catamco. After finishing basic education at Kidapawan City Pilot Elementary School and Kidapawan City National High School, she went to Ateneo de Davao University to earn her AB English degree. She continued her post-graduate studies with units in guidance and counselling from the Alliance Graduate School. She has 2 sons, Nathaniel Phillippe and Patrick Nikolai. They have dog named Zelda who has won over 10 awards in dog competitions.
