= Emmylou Mendoza =

Filipina politician

Emmylou Taliño-Mendoza
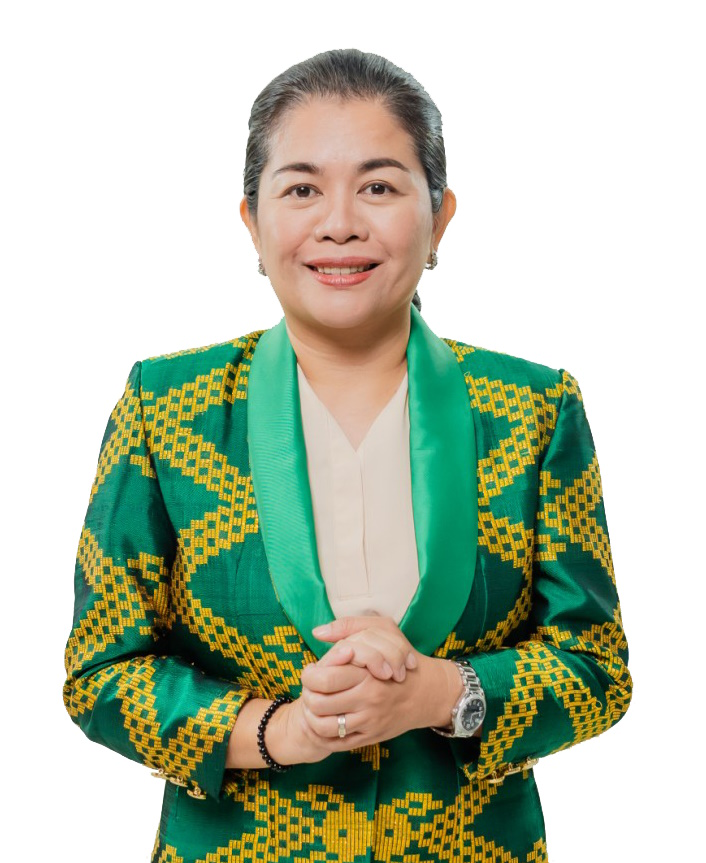

Governor of Cotabato
- Incumbent
- Assumed office June 30, 2022
- Vice Governor: Efren Piñol (2022–2025); Rochella Marie Taray (2025–present)
- Preceded by: Nancy Catamco
- In office June 30, 2010 – June 30, 2019
- Vice Governor: Gregorio Ipong (2010–2017); Shirlyn Macasarte-Villanueva (2017–2019)
- Preceded by: Jesus Sacdalan
- Succeeded by: Nancy Catamco

Vice Governor of Cotabato
- In office June 30, 2019 – June 30, 2022
- Governor: Nancy Catamco
- Preceded by: Shirlyn Macasarte-Villanueva
- Succeeded by: Efren Piñol

Member of the Philippine House of Representatives from Cotabato's 1st district
- In office June 30, 2001 – June 30, 2010
- Preceded by: Anthony P. Dequiña
- Succeeded by: Jesus N. Sacdalan

Personal details
- Born: Emmylou Jacolo Taliño; February 25, 1972 (age 54) Makilala, Cotabato, Philippines
- Party: Nacionalista (2004–2007; 2018–present)
- Other political affiliations: Liberal (2012–2018); Lakas (2007–2012); Independent (2001–2004)
- Spouse: Raymond Mendoza (m. 2007)
- Children: Maria Alana Samantha; Emilio Ramon
- Education: Ateneo de Davao University

Emmylou "Lala" Jacolo Taliño-Mendoza (born February 25, 1972) is a Filipina politician. She was a representative for the first congressional district of Cotabato from 2001 until 2010. She was then elected as the Governor of Cotabato against Agriculture Secretary Emmanuel Piñol. She was elected until her last term in 2019, when she was elected as vice governor. She was then elected as the Governor of Cotabato in 2022 and currently serves as the governor.

== Early life and education ==
Emmylou Taliño was born on February 25, 1972, in Makilala, North Cotabato (now known as Cotabato). She studied at the Notre Dame of Kidapawan for Girls for her primary and secondary education. She studied at Ateneo de Davao University for her tertiary education as an undergraduate for accountancy. She studied at the University of Southern Mindanao in Kabacan, Cotabato and gained an Honorary Degree as a Doctor of Science in Rural Development. For her diploma, she studied at the University of Asia and the Pacific in the Agribusiness Executive’s Program. She gained her masteral education at the National Defense College of the Philippines as an Executive Master in National Security Administration.

== Early political career and representative ==
From 1993 to 1996, she was the chairperson for Sangguniang Kabataan. In 1998, she was the Senior Board Member for the Local Government Unit in Cotabato. She became a representative for Cotabato's 1st congressional district after the 2001 Philippine House of Representatives elections. In the 12th Congress of the Philippines, she was a member of the Committees of Rules, Accounts, Legislative Franchises, and National Defense.

She was re-elected as a representative for the 1st district of Cotabato in the 2004 Philippine House of Representatives elections. She was a member of the Committees of Rules, Accounts, Legislative Franchises, and National Defense in the 13th Congress of the Philippines.

In the 2007 Philippine House of Representatives elections, she was re-elected as a representative. In the 14th Congress of the Philippines, she was a member of the Commission on Appointments. Moreover, she was a member of the Committees of Rules, Accounts, Legislative Franchises, and National Defense. She was the Vice Chairperson for the Philippine House Committee on Legislative Franchises.

== Governor of Cotabato ==
She won as Governor of the Province during the 2010 Philippine gubernatorial elections against Then-Vice Governor Emmanuel Piñol, causing Piñol to file an election protest against her, which was dismissed. In the 2013 Philippine gubernatorial elections, she won against Piñol, leading Piñol to once again, file an election protest against her, which he eventually reversed. In the 2016 Philippine gubernatorial elections, she ran under the Liberal Party against four other candidates. She won by a landslide, marking her third and final consecutive term. After her win she planned to focus on agriculture and farmers.

In the 2019 Philippine gubernatorial elections, she ran as vice governor under the Nacionalista Party. She ran against Socrates Piñol of Partido Demokratiko Pilipino. She won with 321,838 votes. In the 2022 Philippine gubernatorial elections, she ran for governor under the Nacionalista Party. She gained 308,479 votes or 50.78 percent of the votes, a slight win against Nancy Catamco of Partido Demokratiko Pilipino. In the 2025 Philippine gubernatorial elections, she ran under the Nacionalista Party. She won with 414,043 votes, 51.91 percent of the votes.

== Personal life ==
She is married to Congressman Raymond Mendoza, representative of the TUCP Partylist. Together they have one son, Emilio Ramon, and she has a daughter from a previous marriage, Maria Alana Samantha Santos. She is of an ethnic Ilocano descent.

== Electoral Performance ==
2025

Candidate	Party	Votes	%
Emmylou Mendoza (Incumbent)	Nacionalista	414,043	63.61
Emmanuel Piñol	Nationalist People's Coalition	234,393	36.01
Manuel Adajar	Independent	2,446	0.38
Total		650,882	100.00
Registered voters/turnout		797,609	–
Nacionalista hold			
Source: Commission on Elections

2022

Candidate	Party	Votes	%
Emmylou Mendoza	Nacionalista	310,618	50.94
Nancy Catamco (Incumbent)	PDP-Laban	296,330	48.60
Rex Maongko	Independent	1,618	0.27
Manuel Adajar	Independent	1,195	0.20
Total		609,761	100.00

Preceded by Anthony P. Dequiña	Representative, 1st District of Cotabato; 2001–2010	Succeeded by Jesus N. Sacdalan
