= Matalam =

Municipality in Cotabato, Philippines

- Municipality
- Municipality of Matalam

Other transcription(s)
  - Jawi: متالم
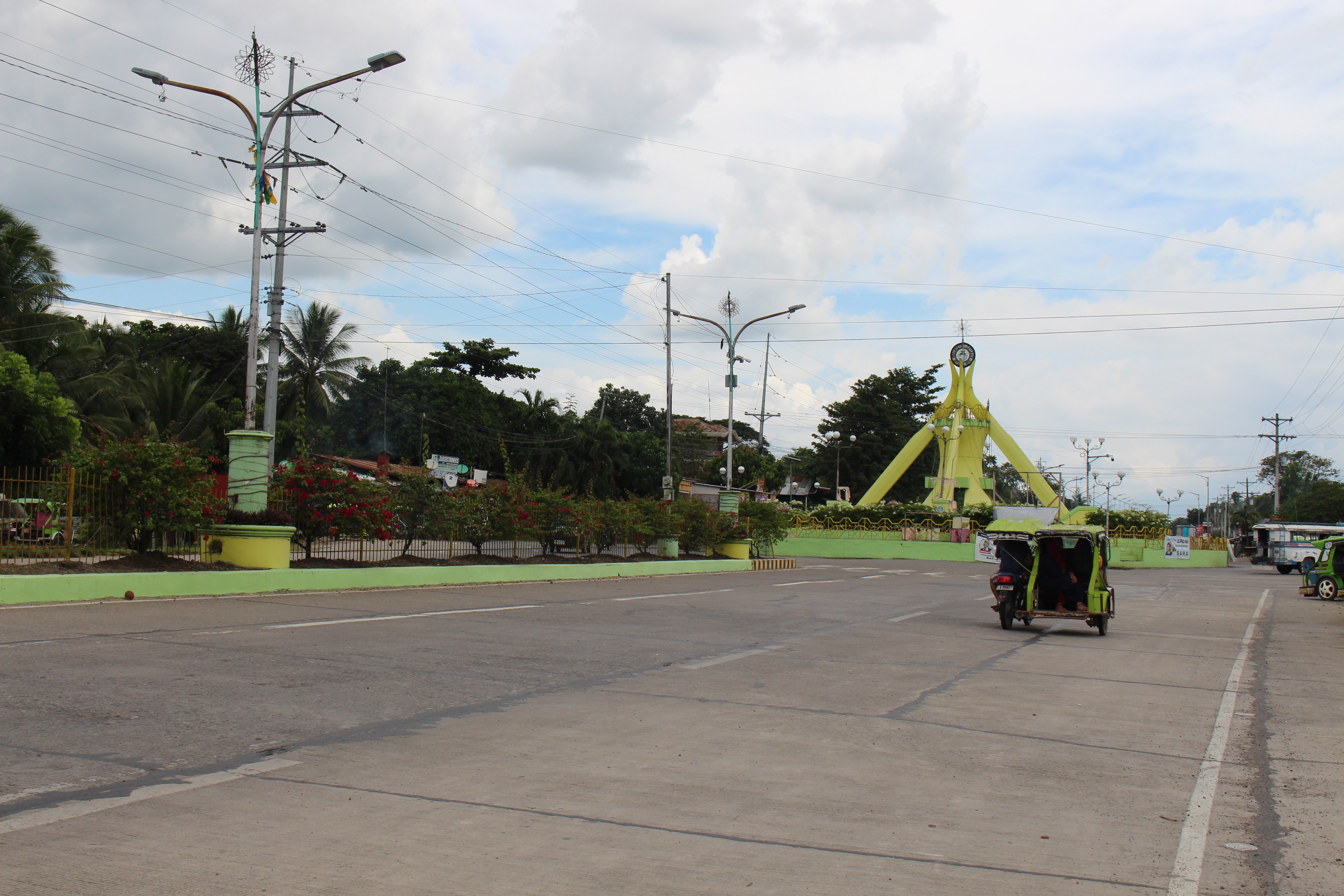
- Matalam Rotonda

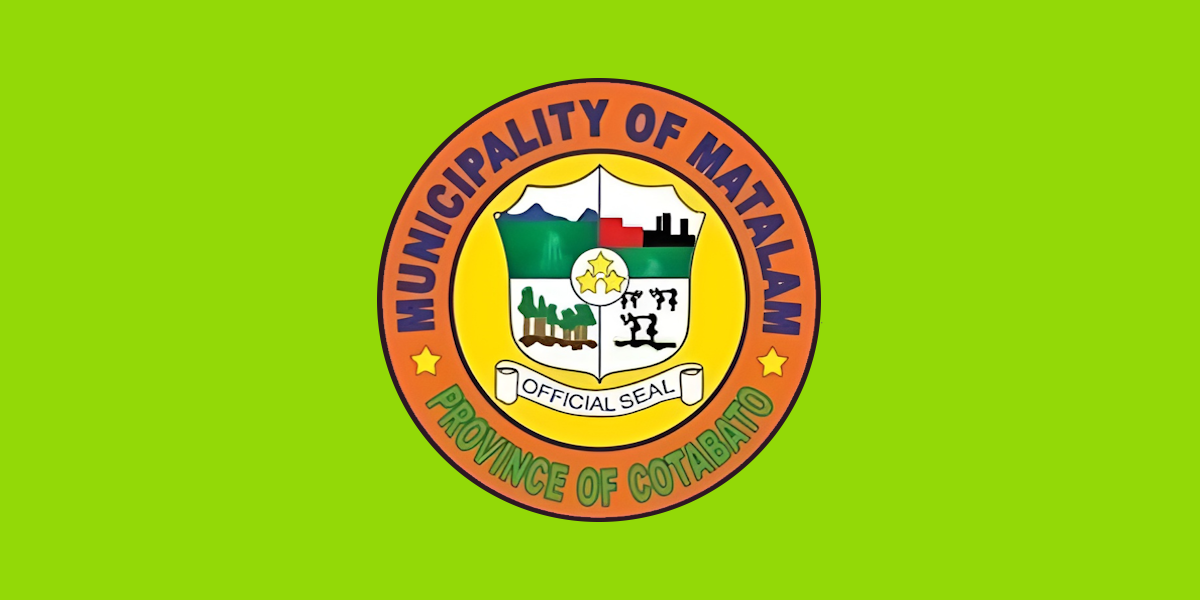
- Flag Seal

- Map of Cotabato with Matalam highlighted
- Interactive map of Matalam
- Location within the Philippines
- Coordinates: 7°05′19″N 124°54′04″E
- Country: Philippines
- Region: Soccsksargen
- Province: Cotabato
- District: 3rd district
- Founded: December 29, 1961
- Barangays: 34 (see Barangays)

Government
  - Type: Sangguniang Bayan
  - Mayor: Oscar M. Valdevieso
  - Vice Mayor: Cheryl V. Catamco
  - Representative: Jose I. Tejada
  - Electorate: 70,866 voters (2025)

Area
  - Total: 476.00 km^{2} (183.78 sq mi)
- Elevation: 42 m (138 ft)
- Highest elevation: 101 m (331 ft)
- Lowest elevation: 15 m (49 ft)

Population (2024 census)
  - Total: 81,355
  - Density: 170.91/km^{2} (442.66/sq mi)
  - Households: 20,071

Economy
  - Income class: 1st municipal income class
  - Poverty incidence: 24.58% (2023)
  - Revenue: ₱ 354.7 million (2024)
  - Assets: ₱ 1,206 million (2024)
  - Expenditure: ₱ 172.9 million (2024)
  - Liabilities: ₱ 222.9 million (2024)

Service provider
  - Electricity: Cotabato Electric Cooperative (COTELCO)
- Time zone: UTC+8 (PST)
- ZIP code: 9406
- PSGC: 1204708000
- IDD : area code: +63 (0)64
- Native languages: Hiligaynon; Cebuano; Maguindanao; Ilianen; Tagalog
- Website: matalam.gov.ph

Matalam, officially the Municipality of Matalam (Hiligaynon: Banwa sang Matalam; Cebuano: Lungsod sa Matalam; Maguindanaon: Inged nu Matalam, Jawi: ايڠد نو متالم; Tagalog: Bayan ng Matalam), is a municipality in the province of Cotabato, Philippines. According to the 2024 census, it has a population of 81,610 people.

== Etymology ==
The municipality takes its name from a former provincial governor Datu Udtog Matalam, which in turn, the word "Matalam" means 'weaponry or arms' in Maguindanaon.

== History ==
The municipality of Matalam before its creation into a regular municipality was just a mere sitio of Kilada called "Crossing M'lang" within the jurisdiction of the municipality of Kabacan. Because of its strategic location coupled with the desire of the people, petitioned the provincial and national government for its creation into a regular municipality. This municipality, at that time the 32rd in Cotabato, was named after the father of the Province, Governor Datu Udtog Matalam, in acknowledgement of his untiring efforts for the development and creation of the place.

Matalam is one of the five daughter municipalities of Kidapawan. It was formed through Executive Order No. 461, issued by President Carlos P. Garcia on December 29, 1961; with the western territory of Kidapawan being taken and merged with that from M'lang, another daughter town, and Kabacan. The creation caused splitting of the village of Patadon into two. With this creation, Kidapawan and Kabacan, neighbored since precolonial era, were cut off.

The municipal council of Kidapawan, among those who opposed the partition of the mother town, called such creation a "midnight" act by President Garcia who had lost in the election, and filed a petition urging the following President, Diosdado Macapagal, to cancel the establishment of Matalam, but later failed.

A portion of the municipality would separate into two President Roxas, another daughter town of Kidapawan which was partitioned in 1967; the area separated to create Antipas, through Batas Pambansa Blg. 88 of 1980.

== Matalam Roundball ==
The Matalam Roundball (commonly referred to locally as the Matalam Roundabout) is a prominent local landmark and traffic junction located in the municipality of Matalam, Cotabato, Philippines. Built in the mid-1990s, the structure serves as a central point of navigation and a civic emblem for the municipality.

== History ==
=== Background and Construction ===
The site originally operated as the central public market for Matalam, serving as the main commercial hub for local vendors and residents trading agricultural goods and daily necessities.

Around 1995, during the first mayoral term of Mayor Oscar M. Valdevieso (who assumed office in 1994), municipal urban development plans prompted the relocation of the public market to accommodate growing traffic demands and central town planning.

=== Transformation into a Roundabout ===
Following the decommission of the old market ground, the site was redeveloped into a major roundabout—locally termed the "Roundball"—to regulate traffic flow at the intersection connecting key local and provincial roadways. Over time, the area transitioned from a purely functional traffic landmark into a recognized local symbol of Matalam's civic identity.

== Geography ==
Matalam is a palm shape municipality. It is centrally located right at the heart of the province of Cotabato. It is bounded on the east by the Kidapawan City, Municipalities of Antipas and Pres. Roxas; on the north by Municipality of Pres. Roxas; on the west by Municipality of Kabacan; and on the south by Municipality of M’lang. It lies along the Cotabato-Davao National Highway occupying the large portion of the Arakan Valley.

=== Barangays ===
Matalam is politically subdivided into 34 barangays. Each barangay consists of puroks while some have sitios.

- New Alimodian
- Arakan
- Bangbang
- Bato
- Central Malamote
- Dalapitan
- Estado
- Ilian
- Kabulacan
- Kibia
- Kibudoc
- Kidama
- Kilada
- Lampayan
- Latagan
- Linao
- Lower Malamote
- Manubuan
- Manupal
- Marbel
- Minamaing
- Natutungan
- New Bugasong
- New Pandan
- Patadon West
- Poblacion
- Salvacion
- Santa Maria
- Sarayan
- Taculen
- Taguranao
- Tamped (Tampad)
- New Abra
- Pinamaton

=== Climate ===
Climate data for Matalam, Cotabato
Month	Jan	Feb	Mar	Apr	May	Jun	Jul	Aug	Sep	Oct	Nov	Dec	Year
Mean daily maximum °C (°F)	31 (88)	32 (90)	32 (90)	33 (91)	32 (90)	31 (88)	30 (86)	30 (86)	31 (88)	31 (88)	31 (88)	31 (88)	31 (88)
Mean daily minimum °C (°F)	21 (70)	21 (70)	21 (70)	22 (72)	23 (73)	23 (73)	22 (72)	23 (73)	22 (72)	23 (73)	22 (72)	22 (72)	22 (72)
Average precipitation mm (inches)	19 (0.7)	14 (0.6)	15 (0.6)	18 (0.7)	33 (1.3)	42 (1.7)	44 (1.7)	42 (1.7)	30 (1.2)	31 (1.2)	28 (1.1)	17 (0.7)	333 (13.2)
Average rainy days	6.9	5.6	6.9	8.1	15.1	17.5	17.8	18.5	14.9	14.9	12.4	8.0	146.6
Source: Meteoblue

Matalam belongs to the 4th type of climate, which is characterized by a more or less even distribution of rainfall throughout the year. The municipality has an average rainfall of 13.63 inches (346 mm). The heaviest rainfall months of the year are May, June and July. The prevailing wind direction is from west to east. Matalam is geographically located outside typhoon belt. Normal condition temperature ranges from 28 to 38 °C (82 to 100 °F), the month of April being the hottest month, while the coldest month of the year is December.

== Demographics ==
Population census of Matalam
Year	Pop.	±% p.a.
1970	36,036	—
1975	38,993	+1.59%
1980	48,420	+4.42%
1990	48,745	+0.07%
1995	54,463	+2.10%
2000	60,146	+2.15%
2007	66,204	+1.33%
2010	74,034	+4.15%
2015	79,361	+1.33%
2020	81,355	+0.52%
2024	81,610	+0.08%
Source: Philippine Statistics Authority

In the 2024 census, the population of Matalam was 81,610 people, with a density of 170 inhabitants per square kilometre or 440 inhabitants per square mile.

Ilianen Manobo and Maguindanaon are the native inhabitants of the municipality.

== Transportation ==
=== Highway accidents ===
A number of significant road accidents have occurred on the main highway in Matalam since 2018, which include motorcycle and other vehicular accidents. On December 19, 2018, 16 people were injured in a Matalam road crash.

Three people were killed and two other injured after Toyota Hilux pickup truck slammed a passing tricycle and a vehicle along Matalam to Kabacan highway road in January 2019. On June 1, 2019, three died in a freak accident involving community FM radio Benny Queman, who was detained by police after hitting motorcycle along Matalam to M'lang highway road in the Philippines. On July 13, 2019, four people died and other three were injured in highway road accident in Matalam.

== Economy ==
Poverty incidence of Matalam (%)

Source: Philippine Statistics Authority

Matalam's market and other commercial establishments are the hub of activity in the area. Commercial establishments in the town include the following: bakeries, gasoline dealers, copra dealers, sari-sari stores, beta houses, carenderias, hardware, grains retailers, fish dealers, and many more.

Rice, corn and copra are commodities which are very much in demand in the local trade. Due to lack of supply, rice and corn grits are sometimes brought in from the mainland. These are retailed in the market for local consumption.

Mineral resources is found on the mountainous portion with properties such as shale sandstone, conglomerate, limestone, igneous rock and other volcanic materials.
