= President Roxas, Cotabato =

Municipality in Cotabato, Philippines

President Roxas
- Municipality
- Municipality of President Roxas
- Seal

- Map of Cotabato with President Roxas highlighted
- Interactive map of President Roxas
- Location within the Philippines
- Coordinates: 7°09′34″N 125°03′05″E
- Country: Philippines
- Region: Soccsksargen
- Province: Cotabato
- District: 2nd district
- Founded: May 8, 1967
- Named for: Manuel Roxas
- Barangays: 25 (see Barangays)

Government
  - Type: Sangguniang Bayan
  - Mayor: Jaime H. Mahimpit
  - Vice Mayor: Jonathan O. Mahimpit
  - Representative: Rudy S. Caoagdan
  - Electorate: 32,383 voters (2025)

Area
  - Total: 618.25 km^{2} (238.71 sq mi)
- Elevation: 239 m (784 ft)
- Highest elevation: 738 m (2,421 ft)
- Lowest elevation: 85 m (279 ft)

Population (2024 census)
  - Total: 51,245
  - Density: 82.887/km^{2} (214.68/sq mi)
  - Households: 12,306

Economy
  - Income class: 1st municipal income class
  - Poverty incidence: 30.54% (2023)
  - Revenue: ₱ 364.7 million (2024)
  - Assets: ₱ 1,009 million (2024)
  - Expenditure: ₱ 311.6 million (2024)
  - Liabilities: ₱ 248.1 million (2024)

Service provider
  - Electricity: Cotabato Electric Cooperative (COTELCO)
- Time zone: UTC+8 (PST)
- ZIP code: 9405
- PSGC: 1204713000
- IDD : area code: +63 (0)64
- Native languages: Hiligaynon; Cebuano; Matigsalug; Ilianen; Tagalog
- Website: www.presroxas-cotabatoprov.gov.ph

President Roxas ([ˈɾohas]), officially the Municipality of President Roxas (Hiligaynon: Banwa sang President Roxas; Cebuano: Lungsod sa President Roxas; Tagalog: Bayan ng President Roxas), is a municipality in the province of Cotabato, Philippines. According to the 2024 census, it has a population of 51,245 people.

== History ==
President Roxas, one of the five daughter municipalities of Kidapawan, was created through Republic Act No. 4869, issued on May 8, 1967, in what was the last of the partitions, when two separate clusters of barangays separated. As a portion of Matalam which is another daughter municipality created in 1961, which would separate in 1980 to form Antipas, split the municipality into two—the upper and lower parts—the municipality, upon creation, became one of few in the country with non-contingent territory.

The bill seeking the creation of this municipality, which was later approved and signed into law by President Ferdinand Marcos, was first introduced in the House of Representatives on January 23, 1967, by Hon. Salipada K. Pendatun, representative of entire province of Cotabato. It was then passed and approved in the House of Senate on February 13, 1967.

Most of the territories comprising the new municipality were formerly part of Kidapawan, the mother municipality extending up to the borders of Bukidnon are the vast Arakan plains, which could boast of its rich and fertile valley suitable for agricultural crops such as rubber, coffee, sugar cane, palay and corn.

Barrio Kabacan, renamed Barrio President Roxas that eventually became the seat of the municipal government was an insignificant area before 1951. In fact, it was Barrio Labuo, where the Manobo Chieftain, Datu Guabong Linog resided with his people who was thriving the area even before the outbreak of the World War II. The Manobo natives have learned to co- exist with the settlers from Visayas and Luzon. After the war, floods of emigrants from different parts of the country continued to arrive at a much faster rate so that by 1957, they had occupied almost all the vast fertile land of the Arakan plains. By this time settlers of Barrio President Roxas had bonded together into an organization called “La castellana home seekers Association” whose membership were mostly people from Negros Occidental. This group helped enhanced the rapid development of the area outpacing the rest of the earlier settlements.

In the early 1960s, Barrio President Roxas became a booming logging community. The concessionaires constructed logging roads extending beyond the Arakan Valley, making it the center of commerce and Agriculture. In the early part of 1970, the road, which was constructed by logging companies stationed at Poblacion was utilized as the main route of transportation in going out to Kidapawan passing Barangay Tuael through Barangay Binay and Poblacion of the Municipality of Magpet. It was in 1967 when the National Highway at km. 114 Paco, Kidapawan was opened. This project propelled the growth of programs and development in the area. Mobility of the people became easy not only in President Roxas but also of the entire Arakan Valley which is composed of five (5) municipalities.

== Geography ==
The municipality of President Roxas is composed of two parts: the northern and the southern part.

Northern President Roxas is bounded by the Municipalities of Damulog and Kibawe of the province of Bukidnon on the north, on the south by the Municipalities of Antipas and Matalam on the west by the Municipality of Carmen and on the east by the Municipality of Arakan.

Meanwhile, Southern President Roxas is bounded on the north by the Municipality of Antipas on the south by Kidapawan City, on the west by Municipality of Matalam and on the east by the Municipality of Magpet.

=== Barangays ===
President Roxas is politically subdivided into 25 barangays. Each barangay consists of puroks while some have sitios.

- Alegria
- Bato-bato
- Del Carmen
- F. Cajelo (New Maasin)
- Edaoman
- Ilustre
- Kamarahan
- Camasi
- Kisupaan
- La Esperanza
- Labu-o
- Lama-lama
- Lomonay
- New Cebu
- Poblacion
- Sagcungan
- Salat
- Sarayan
- Tuael
- Greenhill
- Cabangbangan
- Datu Indang
- Datu Sundungan
- Kimahuring
- Mabuhay

=== Climate ===
Climate data for President Roxas, Cotabato
Month	Jan	Feb	Mar	Apr	May	Jun	Jul	Aug	Sep	Oct	Nov	Dec	Year
Mean daily maximum °C (°F)	30 (86)	30 (86)	31 (88)	32 (90)	30 (86)	29 (84)	29 (84)	29 (84)	30 (86)	30 (86)	30 (86)	30 (86)	30 (86)
Mean daily minimum °C (°F)	21 (70)	21 (70)	21 (70)	23 (73)	23 (73)	23 (73)	23 (73)	23 (73)	23 (73)	23 (73)	22 (72)	22 (72)	22 (72)
Average precipitation mm (inches)	51 (2.0)	41 (1.6)	38 (1.5)	45 (1.8)	82 (3.2)	108 (4.3)	114 (4.5)	120 (4.7)	95 (3.7)	96 (3.8)	76 (3.0)	52 (2.0)	918 (36.1)
Average rainy days	10.2	8.1	9.8	15.3	22.5	23.9	25.2	25.4	23.3	24.1	21.0	16.8	225.6
Source: Meteoblue

== Demographics ==
Population census of President Roxas
Year	Pop.	±% p.a.
1970	20,639	—
1975	20,351	−0.28%
1980	25,784	+4.84%
1990	32,774	+2.43%
1995	36,788	+2.19%
2000	41,231	+2.47%
2007	43,133	+0.62%
2010	44,229	+0.92%
2015	47,575	+1.40%
2020	52,512	+2.10%
2024	51,245	−0.58%
Source: Philippine Statistics Authority

In the 2024 census, the population of President Roxas was 51,245 people, with a density of 83 inhabitants per square kilometre or 210 inhabitants per square mile.

== Economy ==
Poverty incidence of President Roxas (%)

Source: Philippine Statistics Authority

Industries

- Banana chip making
- Fish crackers
- Sandal making
- Macaroni chips
- Native chicken production
