= Arakan, Cotabato =

Municipality in Cotabato, Philippines

Arakan
- Municipality
- Municipality of Arakan
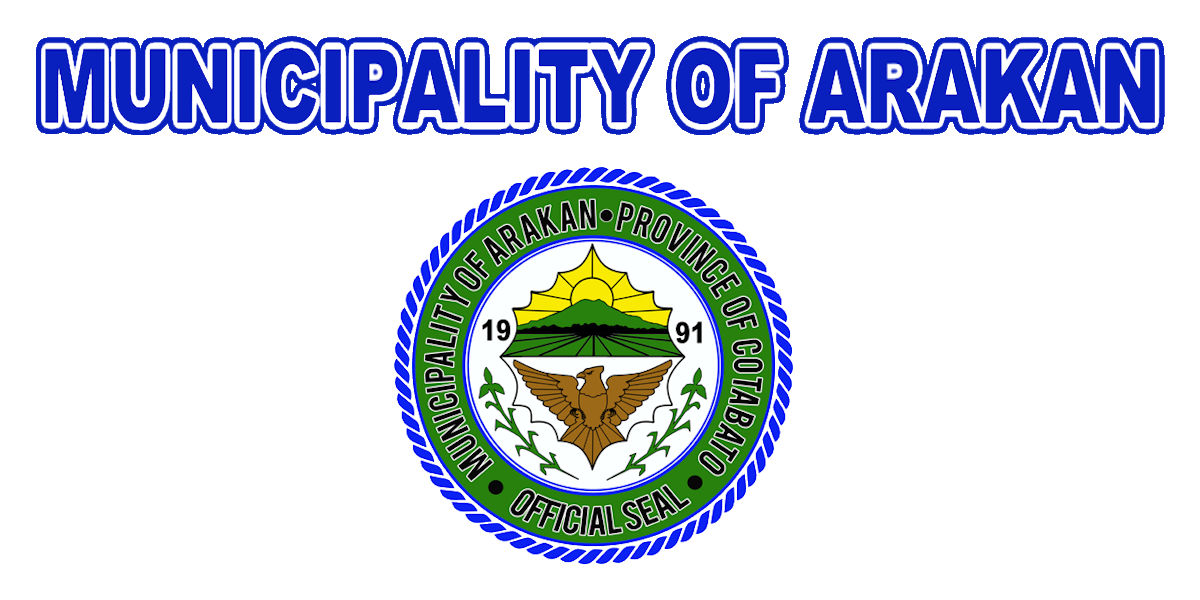
- Flag Seal

- Map of Cotabato with Arakan highlighted
- Interactive map of Arakan
- Location within the Philippines
- Coordinates: 7°21′10″N 125°07′43″E
- Country: Philippines
- Region: Soccsksargen
- Province: Cotabato
- District: 2nd district
- Founded: August 30, 1991
- Barangays: 28 (see Barangays)

Government
  - Type: Sangguniang Bayan
  - Mayor: Jeam "Nonoy" Villasor
  - Vice Mayor: Mary "Inday" Gerlie TUBLE Montales
  - Representative: Rudy S. Caoagdan
  - Electorate: 32,556 voters (2025)

Area
  - Total: 693.22 km^{2} (267.65 sq mi)
- Elevation: 244 m (801 ft)
- Highest elevation: 600 m (2,000 ft)
- Lowest elevation: 106 m (348 ft)

Population (2024 census)
  - Total: 51,584
  - Density: 74.412/km^{2} (192.73/sq mi)
  - Households: 12,342

Economy
  - Income class: 1st municipal income class
  - Poverty incidence: 28.47% (2023)
  - Revenue: ₱ 361.1 million (2024)
  - Assets: ₱ 482 million (2024)
  - Expenditure: ₱ 350.4 million (2024)
  - Liabilities: ₱ 138.6 million (2024)

Service provider
  - Electricity: Cotabato Electric Cooperative (COTELCO)
- Time zone: UTC+8 (PST)
- ZIP code: 9417
- PSGC: 1204718000
- IDD : area code: +63 (0)64
- Native languages: Hiligaynon; Cebuano; Matigsalug; Ilianen; Tagalog; Maguindanaon
- Website: www.arakan-cotabatoprov.gov.ph

Arakan, officially the Municipality of Arakan (Hiligaynon: Banwa sang Arakan; Cebuano: Lungsod sa Arakan; Maguindanaon: Inged nu Arakan, Jawi: ايڠد نو اراكن; Filipino: Bayan ng Arakan) is a municipality in the province of Cotabato, Philippines. According to the 2024 census, it has a population of 51,584 people.

== History ==
The word Arakan is derived from the Manobo term “ara” which means abundance of natural resources in the valley and “kan” which means heroism, bravery and valor of the early Manobo leaders and settlers of the area. The word “arakan” then was named referring to one of the rivers of the valley. Arakan is basically a territory of a number of ethno-linguistic groups, predominantly of the Manobo-Kulamanon and Manobo-Tinananon tribes. The names of the two (2) big rivers in Arakan were also from these ethnic groups of the Kulaman and Tinanan Rivers. The original settlers of the place are the Manobos, which were believed to have originally come from the string of islands in the Malayan Peninsula and Borneo. This assumption is based on their language structure which has Malayan roots.

Throughout the years, they maintained contacts and inter-marriages with other tribes such as Matigsalogs and other lesser Bagobo tribes. The early migrant settlers from Visayas came in as early as the 1930s. Massive clearing of the forest areas became the order of these years for agricultural and settlement purposes. Due to these activities, the Manobos were forced to settle in the inner portions away from those areas occupied by the Bisayans. They were pushed further still and they permanently inhabited the highlands of the valley to avoid social and cultural interactions with the migrant Bisayans.

Early attempts to fully develop Arakan dated back in the 1970s when then Mayor Froilan Matas of the Municipality of Magpet (mother municipality of Arakan) unified his efforts with the Sangguniang Bayan, which was ably supported by the barangay leaders, and its populace led by Greenfield (now Poblacion) Barangay Chairman Aproniano A. Ebon, Sr. through a resolution strongly manifesting its support to the creation of a separate municipality of Arakan. In 1972, a more unified attempts to create the municipality by the provincial leadership has led the passing of House Bill No. 4805 sponsored by the then Assemblyman Salipada K. Pendatun. The declaration of martial law in the same year deterred its creation. This did not however, dampen the hope of the great leaders of Magpet.

The EDSA Revolution that took place in 1986 paved way to another attempt of the creation of a separate and new municipality through the collaborative efforts of the municipal government of Magpet spearheaded by then Vice Mayor Aproniano A. Ebon, Sr., the provincial leadership headed by then Governor Rosario P. Diaz, M.D. and the most especially by the passage of a house bill sponsored by Congressman Gregorio A. Andolana of the Second District of Cotabato Province.

Arakan is one of the granddaughter municipalities of Kidapawan. It was created by virtue of Republic Act No. 7152, approved by President Corazon Aquino on August 30, 1991; constituting 18 barangays separated from Magpet. The seat of government was designated at Barangay Greenfield. The separation caused Kidapawan to eventually lose all its borders with Davao Region, excluding Mount Apo which is being shared by Kidapawan, Davao, and four other towns. This separation also made Arakan the province's youngest municipality.

Under the provision of the Act, it had to elect its new officials in local election on May 11, 1992. The then Vice Mayor Ebon overwhelmingly got the mandate as the first Municipal Mayor, while David B. Figura, Sr. was the first Vice Mayor. Ebon spent three terms as municipal mayor, as did David B. Figura, Sr. (who died before his last term ended).

In Kabalantian (at that time part of Magpet), on January 2–3, 1986, atrocities took place where six individuals were killed and houses were burned down, reportedly by members of the Landasan armed group.

== Geography ==
Arakan is officially located at the northeastern portion of Cotabato province. With Davao City and Mount Sinaka to the east; the mother Municipality, Magpet to the south; Municipality of Antipas to the southwest; Municipality of Pres. Roxas to the west; and the Province of Bukidnon to the north.

=== Barangays ===
Arakan is politically subdivided into 28 barangays. Each barangay consists of puroks while some have sitios.

- Allab
- Anapolon
- Badiangon
- Binoongan
- Dallag
- Datu Ladayon
- Datu Matangkil
- Doroluman
- Gambodes
- Ganatan
- Greenfield
- Kabalantian
- Katipunan
- Kinawayan
- Kulaman Valley
- Lanao Kuran
- Libertad
- Makalangot
- Malibatuan
- Maria Caridad
- Meocan
- Naje
- Napalico
- Salasang
- San Miguel
- Santo Niño
- Sumalili
- Tumanding

=== Climate ===
Climate data for Arakan, Cotabato
Month	Jan	Feb	Mar	Apr	May	Jun	Jul	Aug	Sep	Oct	Nov	Dec	Year
Mean daily maximum °C (°F)	29 (84)	29 (84)	30 (86)	31 (88)	30 (86)	29 (84)	29 (84)	29 (84)	29 (84)	29 (84)	29 (84)	29 (84)	29 (85)
Mean daily minimum °C (°F)	20 (68)	20 (68)	20 (68)	21 (70)	22 (72)	22 (72)	22 (72)	22 (72)	22 (72)	22 (72)	22 (72)	21 (70)	21 (71)
Average precipitation mm (inches)	46 (1.8)	35 (1.4)	41 (1.6)	38 (1.5)	67 (2.6)	79 (3.1)	68 (2.7)	66 (2.6)	52 (2.0)	59 (2.3)	62 (2.4)	45 (1.8)	658 (25.8)
Average rainy days	11.4	9.7	12.3	14.1	22.1	23.7	22.7	21.8	19.2	21.8	20.2	14.8	213.8
Source: Meteoblue

== Demographics ==
Population census of Arakan
Year	Pop.	±% p.a.
1995	27,554	—
2000	34,588	+4.99%
2007	38,717	+1.57%
2010	43,554	+4.38%
2015	48,228	+1.96%
2020	50,558	+1.00%
2024	51,584	+0.48%
Source: Philippine Statistics Authority

In the 2024 census, the population of Arakan was 51,584 people, with a density of 74 inhabitants per square kilometre or 190 inhabitants per square mile.

== Economy ==
Poverty incidence of Arakan

Source: Philippine Statistics Authority

== Tourism ==
- Epol River, (in Barangay Gambodes) has 6 series of waterfalls and river pools and is 3 kilometres (1.9 mi) long.
- Matigol Falls, (in Inamong, Barangay Datu Ladayon), has a cave beside it and is 100 metres (330 ft) high.
- Lake Luningning, (in Barangay Ganatan) has a depth of 30 metres (98 ft) and an underground spring. It is 4 hectares (9.9 acres) wide.
- Tinanan River, (in Valencia, Santo Niño) has 6 springs and two unexplored caves.
- Gaem Cave, a church-like cave (in Sitio Langub, Barangay Gambodes), has an area of 900 square metres (9,700 sq ft) and a height of 10 metres (33 ft).
- Bukatol Cave and Park, (in Bukatol, Barangay Kinawayan). From Mt. Sinaka, the Arakan Valley can be viewed.
- Forest Wildlife Park, 500 hectares (1,200 acres) of forest (in Sinai, Barangay Salasang), home to Philippine Eagles and hornbills
- Bokwan Falls, 5-tiered and 15 metres (49 ft) (in Upper Lombo, Barangay Kabalantian)
- Salasang Cave and Spring (Formon/Natubalan, Barangay Salasang)
- Nabuns Cave (Sitio Langub, Barangay Gambodes)
- Nanilungan Falls, 50 metres (160 ft) high (in Barangay Gambodes)
- Yellow Gate zipline (in sitio Langub, Barangay Gambodes).
- Datu Ladayon Rice Terraces (in Datu Ladayon), the only terraced paddies in the area
- Aguas falls (Sitio Dao, Barangay Salasang)

== Government ==
As of 2022, Jeam D. Villasor is municipal mayor.

- Vice Mayor:
  - Gerlie T. Montales
- Councilors:
  - Rene Rubino
  - Julius Raniola
  - Vena May Cambel
  - Dondon Bunsuran
  - Ria Gayatin
  - Queeny Wong
  - Jun Moreno
  - Joselito Cases
