= Antipas, Cotabato =

Municipality in Cotabato, Philippines

Antipas
- Municipality
- Municipality of Antipas
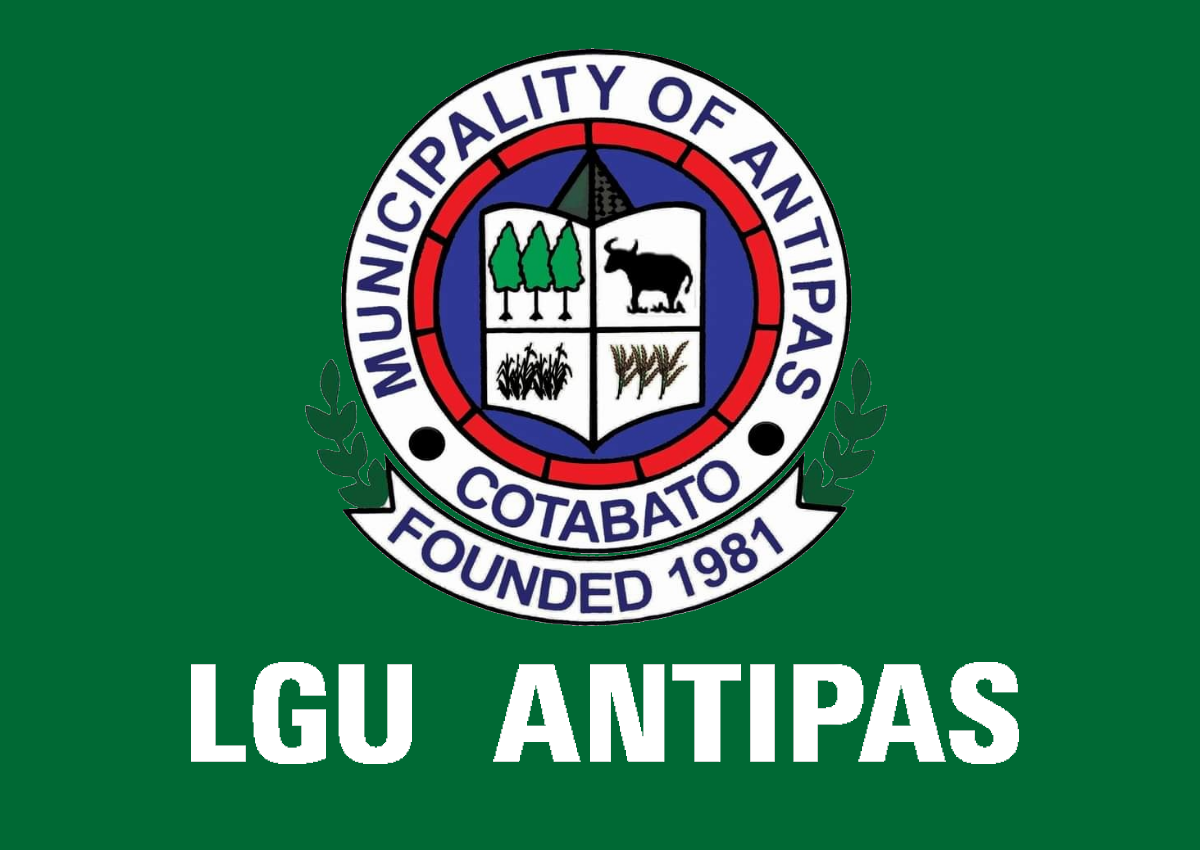
- Flag Seal
- Nickname: Economic Center of Arakan Valley
- Map of Cotabato with Antipas highlighted
- Interactive map of Antipas
- Location within the Philippines
- Coordinates: 7°14′58″N 125°03′19″E
- Country: Philippines
- Region: Soccsksargen
- Province: Cotabato
- District: 2nd district
- Founded: March 7, 1981
- Barangays: 13 (see Barangays)

Government
  - Type: Sangguniang Bayan
  - Mayor: Cristobal D. Cadungon
  - Vice Mayor: Jimmy D. Sarmiento
  - Representative: Rudy S. Caoagdan
  - Electorate: 17,871 voters (2025)

Area
  - Total: 552.50 km^{2} (213.32 sq mi)
- Elevation: 323 m (1,060 ft)
- Highest elevation: 636 m (2,087 ft)
- Lowest elevation: 136 m (446 ft)

Population (2024 census)
  - Total: 26,946
  - Density: 48.771/km^{2} (126.32/sq mi)
  - Households: 6,562

Economy
  - Income class: 1st municipal income class
  - Poverty incidence: 23.07% (2023)
  - Revenue: ₱ 339.1 million (2024)
  - Assets: ₱ 711.4 million (2024)
  - Expenditure: ₱ 243 million (2024)
  - Liabilities: ₱ 251.2 million (2024)

Service provider
  - Electricity: Cotabato Electric Cooperative (COTELCO)
- Time zone: UTC+8 (PST)
- ZIP code: 9414
- PSGC: 1204715000
- IDD : area code: +63 (0)64
- Native languages: Hiligaynon; Cebuano; Maguindanao; Ilianen; Tagalog
- Website: antipas.gov.ph

Antipas, officially the Municipality of Antipas (Kinaray-a: Banwa ka(ng) Antipas; Hiligaynon: Banwa sang Antipas; Cebuano: Lungsod sa Antipas; Tagalog: Bayan ng Antipas; Maguindanaon: Inged nu Antipas, Jawi: ايڠايد نو انتيڤاس), is a municipality in the province of Cotabato, Philippines. According to the 2024 census, it has a population of 26,946 people.

== History ==
Before its creation into a regular municipality Antipas was called Buru-Buruan, a sitio of Barangay Kiyaab in Matalam which is inhabited mostly by Manobos. As Christians settled in the area, the Municipal Council of Matalam passed a resolution in 1963, approved by the former Provincial Board of Cotabato and was consequently recognized as a regular barangays of Matalam, renamed Antipas.

The name Antipas was derived from "anti" from the word Antique and "pas" from Passi, two places found on Panay Island. The enthusiasm of the natives and their determination to run their own affairs coupled with the fertility of the soil and a promise of a brighter future of the area made them petition the national government through Governor Carlos B. Cajelo and Assemblyman Jesús Amparo of the Batasang Pambansa.

Antipas was formed by virtue of Batas Pambansa Blg. 88, approved by President Ferdinand Marcos on October 14, 1980, constituting nine barangays from Matalam— a portion that separating two clusters of barangays of President Roxas. Its seat of government was designated in Barangay Antipas. A plebiscite was later held and the establishment was inaugurated.

Ratified on December 6, 1980, and ultimately inaugurated on March 7, 1981, Antipas was created as the 15th municipality of Cotabato.

== Geography ==
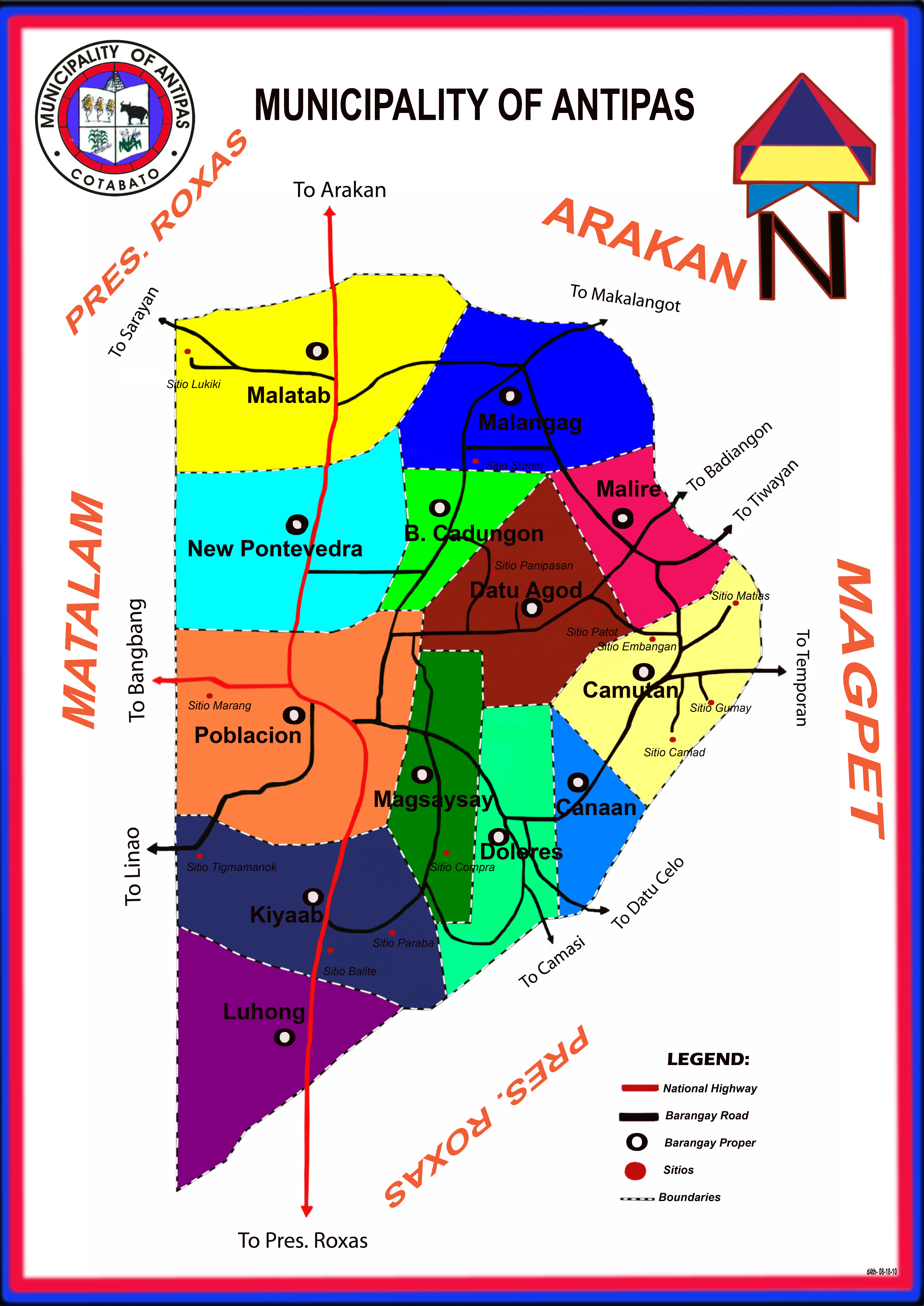

Antipas is centrally located at the heart of Arakan Valley. It is bounded on the southeast by the Municipality of Magpet, on the north-east by the Municipality of Arakan, on the north by the Municipality of President Roxas (north) and Arakan River, on the west by its mother municipality, Matalam and on the south by President Roxas (south).

=== Barangays ===
Antipas is politically subdivided into 13 barangays. Each barangay consists of puroks while some have sitios.

- Camutan
- Canaan
- Dolores
- Kiyaab
- Luhong
- Magsaysay
- Malangag
- Malatab
- Malire
- New Pontevedra
- Poblacion
- B. Cadungon
- Datu Agod

=== Climate ===
Climate data for Antipas, Cotabato
Month	Jan	Feb	Mar	Apr	May	Jun	Jul	Aug	Sep	Oct	Nov	Dec	Year
Mean daily maximum °C (°F)	29 (84)	29 (84)	30 (86)	31 (88)	29 (84)	28 (82)	28 (82)	28 (82)	29 (84)	29 (84)	29 (84)	29 (84)	29 (84)
Mean daily minimum °C (°F)	19 (66)	19 (66)	20 (68)	21 (70)	22 (72)	22 (72)	22 (72)	22 (72)	22 (72)	22 (72)	21 (70)	20 (68)	21 (70)
Average precipitation mm (inches)	46 (1.8)	35 (1.4)	41 (1.6)	38 (1.5)	67 (2.6)	79 (3.1)	68 (2.7)	66 (2.6)	52 (2.0)	59 (2.3)	62 (2.4)	45 (1.8)	658 (25.8)
Average rainy days	11.4	9.7	12.3	14.1	22.1	23.7	22.7	21.8	19.2	21.8	20.2	14.8	213.8
Source: Meteoblue

Antipas belongs to the "4" type of climate characterized by a distribution of rainfall throughout the year, with an average rainfall of 267 mm. The heaviest rainfalls frequently occur during the months of May, June, July and August. Antipas being centrally located at the heart of Arakan Valley is protected by Mount Apo from typhoons and bad weather. Prevailing wind directions are the Northeast and Southwest monsoon.

Temperature ranges from 23 to 32 degrees Celsius, because of its topographic elevation of 320 meters above sea level and proximity to mountainous Bukidnon province, making it one of the cool places in Soccsksargen. The highest temperature is felt during the months of March and April, while the lowest is in December. The long dry season usually lasts from January to April, during which months there is also a marked decrease in water supply for agricultural purposes when some water sources dry up, affecting agricultural productivity. During the peak rainy season, some rivers/creeks overflow, causing low-lying areas to flood.

== Demographics ==
Population census of Antipas
Year	Pop.	±% p.a.
1990	17,800	—
1995	19,171	+1.40%
2000	19,810	+0.71%
2007	22,892	+2.01%
2010	25,242	+3.62%
2015	25,304	+0.05%
2020	26,817	+1.23%
2024	26,946	+0.12%
Source: Philippine Statistics Authority

In the 2024 census, the population of Antipas was 26,946 people, with a density of 49 inhabitants per square kilometre or 130 inhabitants per square mile.

=== Language ===
The majority language spoken is Hiligaynon/Ilonggo and also Cebuano, Karay-a and Ilocano, who are the settlers from Luzon and Visayas. The native languages are Ilianen and Magindanawn.

== Economy ==
Poverty incidence of Antipas

Source: Philippine Statistics Authority

Antipas was classified as a municipality by the DILG-LGMPS in 2011. It yielded an income of Php 87,510,519.00, where Php 80,567,780.00 is from IRA and Php 6,942,739.00 from Local-Sourced Revenues. The municipality is considered the economic center of Arakan Valley Complex. It plays a pivotal role in the economic development on its neighboring towns. It is the commercial, industrial and trading hub of four neighboring municipalities.

Rubber and cavendish banana production are the major crops. A major company engaged in Cavendish production in the area is AJMR/SUMIFRU Philippines. Other industries present in the area deal with agriculture support facilities such as rice mill, corn mills, corn sheller and drier. Some furniture making, tailoring and welding are also present within the locality. The palm oil industry is now also in the rise as businessmen and farmers venture further in finding ways on how to utilize their lands effectively.

=== Natural resources ===
Antipas is predominantly an agriculture area. Antipas is identified as a major banana-, corn- and rubber-producing area in relation to soil type and soil capability dominant in the area. Coupled with these is the potential of the area for agri-based industries like cassava, coconut and rubber, rice, coffee and cacao.

== Transportation ==
Local means of transportation is served by tricycles known locally as just "motor". Transportation to its barangays and adjacent municipalities is served by motorcycles, Jeepneys, and L300 Vans. Mini-Buses serves the Arakan—Kidapawan City Route which passes the municipalities of Antipas and President Roxas. Public Utility Vans also served routes to and from the municipalities of Arakan, President Roxas, Barangay Linao and Kiyaab of Antipas and Kidapawan City.

== Healthcare ==
- Antipas Medical Specialist Center Hospital, Inc.
- Arakan Valley District Hospital
- Clinica Catotal

== Education ==
=== Tertiary ===
- Cotabato Foundation College of Science and Technology (CFCST)- Antipas Annex
- St. Uriel School, Inc.
- Untalan Institute of Technology

=== High schools ===
Public schools:

- Antipas National High School - Main Campus
- Antipas National High School - Malire Annex
- Antipas Educational Learning Center
- Camutan High School
- Malatab High School

Private schools:

- SBC Learning Center
- St. Uriel School, INC.
- Untalan Institute of Technology

=== Elementary ===
Public schools:

- Antipas Central Elementary School
- B. Cadungon Elementary School
- Camutan Elementary School
- Cana-an Elementary School
- Datu Agod Elementary School
- Datu Embangan Public School
- Dolores Elementary School
- Kiyaab Elementary School
- Luhong Elementary School
- Magsaysay Elementary School
- Malangag Elementary School
- Malatab Elementary School
- Malire Elementary School
- New Pontevedra Elementary School

Private schools:

- SBC Learning Center
- St. Uriel School, Inc.
- Montessori
