= Magpet =

Municipality in Cotabato, Philippines

- Municipality
- Municipality of Magpet
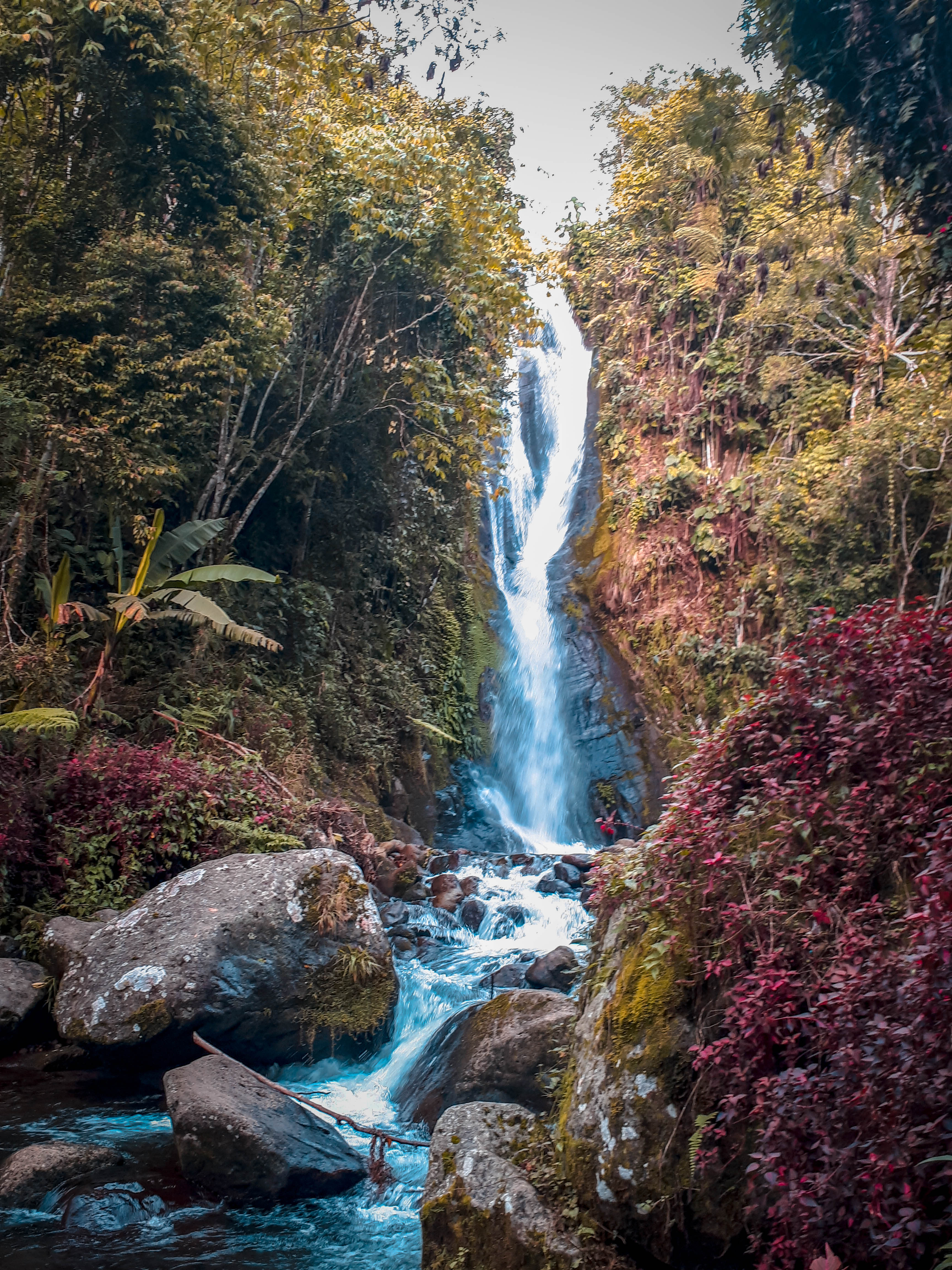
- Tawsuvan Falls

- Seal

- Map of Cotabato with Magpet highlighted
- Interactive map of Magpet
- Location within the Philippines
- Coordinates: 7°06′11″N 125°07′28″E
- Country: Philippines
- Region: Soccsksargen
- Province: Cotabato
- District: 2nd district
- Founded: June 22, 1963
- Barangays: 32 (see Barangays)

Government
  - Type: Sangguniang Bayan
  - Mayor: Jay Laurence S. Gonzaga
  - Vice Mayor: Florenito T. Gonzaga
  - Representative: Rudy S. Caoagdan
  - Electorate: 58,896 voters (2025)

Area
  - Total: 755.36 km^{2} (291.65 sq mi)
- Elevation: 381 m (1,250 ft)
- Highest elevation: 884 m (2,900 ft)
- Lowest elevation: 167 m (548 ft)

Population (2024 census)
  - Total: 52,800
  - Density: 69.9/km^{2} (181/sq mi)
  - Households: 12,997

Economy
  - Income class: 1st municipal income class
  - Poverty incidence: 28.99% (2023)
  - Revenue: ₱ 471.8 million (2024)
  - Assets: ₱ 1,434 million (2024)
  - Expenditure: ₱ 447.9 million (2024)
  - Liabilities: ₱ 440.4 million (2024)

Service provider
  - Electricity: Cotabato Electric Cooperative (COTELCO)
- Time zone: UTC+8 (PST)
- ZIP code: 9404
- PSGC: 1204706000
- IDD : area code: +63 (0)64
- Native languages: Hiligaynon; Cebuano; Tagabawa; Ilianen; Obo; Tagalog
- Website: www.magpet.gov.ph

Magpet, officially the Municipality of Magpet (Hiligaynon: Banwa sang Magpet; Cebuano: Lungsod sa Magpet; Filipino: Bayan ng Magpet), is a municipality in the province of Cotabato, Philippines. According to the 2024 census, it has a population of 55,255.

== History ==
Magpet derived its name from the word malotpot, which means "a place where people gather in fellowship to partake of their packed lunch wrapped in banana leaves".

Magpet is one of the five daughter municipalities of Kidapawan. It was the fourth to be created, by Republic Act (RA) No. 3721 in 1963, organizing the northern part of Kidapawan in the latter's largest single loss of territory to date.

The law was signed by President Diosdado Macapagal on June 22. The first local officials were sworn into office on August 13, 1963, with Froiland Matas as first mayor.

The territory was partitioned in 1991 with the creation of Arakan through RA No. 7152. The establishment of Magpet and Arakan caused Kidapawan eventually losing all its borders with the Davao Region, excluding Mount Apo which is being shared by Kidapawan, Davao, and four other towns.

On January 2–3, 1986, atrocities took place in Kabalantian (now part of Arakan), where six individuals were killed and houses were burned down, reportedly by members of the Landasan armed group.

== Geography ==
The municipality of Magpet is located in the eastern part of Cotabato Province and at the foothills of Mt. Apo with generally a sloping to mountainous terrain. Furthermore, it is a landlocked municipality located at the boundary of the provinces of Cotabato and Davao del Sur. It is bounded on the North by the Municipality of Arakan; on the East by Davao City, on the West by the Municipalities of Pres. Roxas and Antipas and 9.0 km on the South by Kidapawan City of Cotabato Province. The municipality lies between the latitude 7º 6.178’ N and longitude 125º 7.461’ E.

=== Barangays ===
Magpet is politically subdivided into 32 barangays. Each barangay consists of puroks while some have sitios.

- Alibayon
- Amabel
- Bagumbayan
- Balite
- Bangkal
- Bantac
- Basak
- Binay
- Bongolanon
- Datu Celo
- Del Pilar
- Doles
- Don Panaca
- Gubatan
- Ilian
- Imamaling
- Inac
- Kamada
- Kauswagan
- Kinarum
- Kisandal
- Magcaalam
- Mahongcog
- Manobisa
- Manobo
- Noa
- Owas
- Pangao-an
- Poblacion
- Sallab
- Tagbac
- Temporan

=== Physical and geophysical features ===
Magpet has a total land area of 75,536 hectares agricultural and forestlands. It has 32 barangays of which only Barangay Poblacion is considered an urban barangay. Barangays with biggest land area are Libertad (8% of total land area), Manobo (7.3%), Mahongkong (6.7%) and Imamaling (6.1%). Those with smallest land area, on the other hand, are barangays Bagumbayan (0.5% of total land area), Alibayon (0.36%), Del Pilar (0.25%) and Kauswagan (0.17%).

=== Topography ===
Approximately 34.76% or 26,256 hectares are considered areas with very steep to strongly hilly slopes. Around 6,381 hectares of slopes 0 – 3% are very good lands for intensive agricultural production.

The soils found in Magpet are quilada sandy loam (9,846 hectares); aroman clay loam (24,345 hectares) and bolinao clay loam (41,345 hectares). Generally, these lands are classified as No. 45 or mountainous. Magpet's soil is suitable for crops like rubber, coconut, coffee, cacao, black pepper, banana, fruit trees and vegetables. Land capability further rates the soil in the municipality as CE and U classification. Clay loam soils. However, are also found in various barangays.

Dominant soil types in the area have high and medium water holding capacity. About 22% of the land area has no apparent erosion problem while 30,194.70 hectares or 31% have been considered to be under slightly eroded condition. Those classified with moderate erosion potential total to 10,382.20 hectares while 24% or 18,382.20 hectares are already susceptible with severe erosion.

=== Climate ===
Climate data for Magpet, Cotabato
Month	Jan	Feb	Mar	Apr	May	Jun	Jul	Aug	Sep	Oct	Nov	Dec	Year
Mean daily maximum °C (°F)	29 (84)	29 (84)	30 (86)	31 (88)	29 (84)	28 (82)	28 (82)	28 (82)	29 (84)	29 (84)	29 (84)	29 (84)	29 (84)
Mean daily minimum °C (°F)	20 (68)	20 (68)	20 (68)	21 (70)	22 (72)	22 (72)	22 (72)	22 (72)	22 (72)	22 (72)	21 (70)	21 (70)	21 (71)
Average precipitation mm (inches)	51 (2.0)	41 (1.6)	38 (1.5)	45 (1.8)	82 (3.2)	108 (4.3)	114 (4.5)	120 (4.7)	95 (3.7)	96 (3.8)	76 (3.0)	52 (2.0)	918 (36.1)
Average rainy days	13.2	12.0	13.8	15.3	22.5	23.9	25.2	25.4	23.3	24.1	21.0	16.8	236.5
Source: Meteoblue

=== Land area ===
The municipality has an area of approximately 75,536 hectares, 0.98% (744 hectares) of which covers the urban area, while 99.02% (74,792 hectares) of land is for rural area. Based on the Municipality Socio-Economic Profile the municipality has 35 barangays, classified into 1 urban area; the Poblacion and rest (34) are rural area.

=== Natural resources ===
==== Water ====
Several rivers located in Magpet are being tapped for irrigation development and potential for hydro power plants. Others are the major tributaries to Kabacan River, which flows to many barangays of Magpet, to the Municipalities of Pres. Roxas, Matalam, Kabacan, Carmen and connects with Pulangi River. As a major source of water supply, it served for irrigation purposes, servicing thousands of hectares of rice fields not only in the Municipality of Magpet, but also in the various areas of the Province as well. Magpet is serviced by two public water system (Level III) by the Metro Kidapawan Water District(MKWD) servicing to barangays Bongolanon, Kisandal, Tagbak, Poblacion and Gubatan. While Magpet Water Works Services (MWWS), a water system owned and managed by the Local Government Unit extend its services to barangyas Magkaalam, Tagbak, Poblacion, Owas, Kamada, Gubatan, Kauswagan, Alibayon, Del Pilar, Inac, Doles, Binay, Bantac and Pangao-an. Other barangays have their own system, the Barangay Water Sanitation (BAWASA), a level III and level II water system.

==== Minerals ====
Mineral products found in the municipality of Magpet include non-metallic like limestone, sand and gravel which are the basic good materials for constructions while the red and white clay, considered as among the best in the country, are good materials for ceramic production. These can be found particularly in the barangays of Doles, Inca and Noa. Metallic minerals include gold, nickel and silver.

== Economy ==
Poverty incidence of Magpet (%)

Source: Philippine Statistics Authority

The municipality has a huge area for agricultural and mostly the people are farmers and their income derived from farming activities. The average annual family income is Php 83,053 or an average monthly income of Php 6,921.

Wages and salaries as well as entrepreneurial is also as their main income for workers, individual or self-employed income earners has been noted also in the municipality like skylab or single motorcycle driver, tricycle drivers, market and ambulant vendors and among others. The data of poverty incidence of the municipality from the Philippine Statistic Authority, 2012 show that poverty incidence of Magpet is 43.9% in 2006, 36.7% in 2009 and 48.9% in 2012.

Magpet's primary income is coming from agriculture, this is because of huge potential area for agriculture development, and the major agricultural product produce are rubber, banana both lacatan and cardava, coconuts, coffee and frits. While the minor products, rice and corn, root crops, Tahiti and vegetables, etc. The municipality is not so much a meat and poultry producing municipality, but mostly a small or a backyard poultry and hog raising only.

Rice production in Magpet is only 1.16% or 1,028 hectares of the total land area with another 1.50% or 1,115 hectares as potential area due to its land topography, which is mostly hilly or mountainous.

Magpet is the No. 1 Banana producing municipality in the province of North Cotabato. Knowing Magpet has a cool climate and high elevation, favourable in growing large and sweet variety of highland lacatan banana.

Of all the commodity crops planted, Lacatan banana is the no. 1 income generating in the municipality. It covers the entire barangays in Magpet, while some areas identified as rice and corn commodity were subsequently converted into banana plantation areas. About 25% or a total of 171 hectares were converted into banana production.

Banana covers the largest plantation area in the municipality with a total of 2,123.30 hectares and has a total of 940,531,500.00 metric tons per year as of December 31, 2013 data. This Lacatan banana variety is being sold to the local market and transported to Cities like Manila, Cebu, Iloilo and Cagayan de Oro via Davao City.

For now, only DOLE Stanfilco grow Cavendish bananas in the southwest portion of the municipality. This banana variety is exported to Middle East countries and Central Asia countries like China, Singapore and others. It provides employment to local farmers who do not have a farm of their own to till.

Businesses in the municipality are dominated by small to medium-scale establishments engaged mostly in the distribution of finished products. As of 2018, number of registered business establishments totaled to 326 (new – 93; renewal – 233).

Tourism industry is also a very potential entrepreneur in the municipality, this give income to the LGU. Mostly tourist spot was developed by the LGU like in Tausuvan water falls and Kirongdong water falls in Kinarum. There are also privately operated resorts in the municipality.

== Government ==
=== Municipal mayors (1963–present) ===
Name	Start of term	End of term	Manner of assumption
Froilan M. Matas	August 13, 1963	December 31, 1971	Appointed
Jesus L. Apostol	January 1, 1964	December 31, 1967	Elected
Froilan M. Matas	January 1, 1968	December 31, 1971	Elected
Dominador L. Apostol Sr	January 1, 1972	May 2, 1974	Elected
Carlos P. Lebrillo	May 3, 1974	May 31, 1986	Appointed then elected
Nasario Omandac Sr	June 1, 1986	October 7, 1987	Appointed
Eufronio P. Zamoras	October 8, 1987	December. 31, 1987	Appointed
Nicolas Y. Josue	January 1, 1988	January 31, 1988	Appointed
Erlinda A. Lebrillo	February 1, 1988	March 23, 1992	Elected
Federico B. Marañon	March 24, 1992	June 30, 1992	Appointed
Rolando M. Pelonio Sr	July 1, 1992	June 30, 2001	Elected
Angelita P. Pelonio	June 30, 2001	June 30, 2004	Elected
Efren F. Piñol	June 30, 2004	June 30, 2013	Elected
Florenito T. Gonzaga	June 30, 2013	June 30, 2022	Elected
Jay Laurence S. Gonzaga	July 1, 2022	Present	Elected

== Infrastructure ==
=== Roads and bridges ===
Magpet has a total road length of 310.91 kilometers of which 38.30 kilometers National Road, 25.30 kilometers Provincial Road, 8.073 kilometers Municipal Road and 239.237 Barangay road.

These roads are categorized into: Concrete (84.37 km), Asphalt (1.05 km), Gravel (116.17 km), and Earth/ unpaved (109.30 km).

There are 6 bridges and 2 double barrel box culvert along the national highway of Kidapawan-Magpet-Pangao-an Road (KMP) which include 2 FVR type steel bridge and 4 RCDG bridge and 3 bridges and 2 double barrel box culvert along Magpet- Binay- Basak-Temporan Road which include 3 RCDG bridges, in the provincial road along Kisandal-Bongolanon-Magcaalam-Bangkal-Manobo there are 3 bridges, 1 double barrel box culvert and 1 overflow bridge, these 2 bridges are RCDG type of bridges and 1 bailey bridge in Manobo that need immediate repair. Generally the bridges along these national and provincial roads are in good condition but it need maintenance and rehabilitation to make it sure to sustain durability of the structure. It needs to construct new RCDG bridge in Tagibaka river, Bongolanon.

On the other hand, in the barangay roads almost all rivers and creeks have existing bridges and overflow bridges, like the 21 lm bailey bridge in Barangay Ilian, 18 lm bailey bridge in Bangkal, and RCDG bridge in Sitio Namuwaran in Manobisa, RCDG bridge in Tagibaka, Magcaalam. So far all these existing bridges and overflow bridges are in good condition.

People who would like to travel to Cagayan de Oro City may take the route Magpet- Binay- Basak-Temporan - Arakan - Bukidnon highway.

=== Transportation ===
Most areas in the municipality can be reached by any type of transportation especially in the major road networks, but the people prefer to use skylab or single motorcycle type of transportation for the fast transportation especially in the rural barangays. Tricycle is the mode of transportation in going to nearby city of Kidapawan. There are also jeepneys plying in the northern part of the municipality.

=== Power ===
Almost all of the barangays in the municipality has power energy service by Cotabato Electric Cooperative (COTELCO) but this can be found near the electric transmission line and the center of the barangay, but in the sitio power services still needs to be implemented.

== Demographics ==
Population census of Magpet
Year	Pop.	±% p.a.
1970	30,869	—
1975	43,983	+7.36%
1980	47,286	+1.46%
1990	55,399	+1.60%
1995	35,256	−8.12%
2000	38,973	+2.17%
2007	44,114	+1.72%
2010	45,183	+0.88%
2015	49,201	+1.64%
2020	53,800	+1.90%
2024	55,255	+0.64%
Source: Philippine Statistics Authority

In the 2024 census, the population of Magpet was 55,255 people, with a density of 73 inhabitants per square kilometre or 190 inhabitants per square mile.

Poblacion is the densest barangay with a density of 921.

Five densely populated Barangay in Magpet
Barangay	Pop	km2	Pop/km2
Poblacion	6,849	7.44	921
Kauswagan	642	0.98	655
Alibayon	1,001	2.74	365
Gubatan	1,799	4.94	364
Del Pilar	686	1.92	357

Barangay	Population percentage (2015)	Population (2015)	Population (2010)	Change (2010‑2015)	Annual Population Growth Rate (2010‑2015)
Alibayon	2.03%	1,001	920	8.80%	1.62%
Amabel	2.68%	1,318	996	32.33%	5.48%
Bagumbayan	2.17%	1,066	955	11.62%	2.12%
Balete	3.40%	1,674	1,596	4.89%	0.91%
Bangkal	2.24%	1,104	995	10.95%	2.00%
Bantac	2.32%	1,140	1,077	5.85%	1.09%
Basak	5.15%	2,535	2,706	-6.32%	-1.24%
Binay	2.86%	1,406	1,285	9.42%	1.73%
Bongolanon	2.84%	1,398	1,274	9.73%	1.78%
Datu Celo	1.93%	951	1,067	-10.87%	-2.17%
Del Pilar	1.39%	686	667	2.85%	0.54%
Doles	2.61%	1,284	1,157	10.98%	2.00%
Don Panaca	1.52%	750	607	23.56%	4.11%
Gubatan	3.66%	1,799	1,537	17.05%	3.04%
Ilian	1.54%	759	733	3.55%	0.67%
Imamaling	2.11%	1,040	938	10.87%	1.98%
Inac	2.47%	1,217	1,129	7.79%	1.44%
Kamada	2.58%	1,270	1,183	7.35%	1.36%
Kauswagan	1.30%	642	628	2.23%	0.42%
Kinarum	1.96%	964	882	9.30%	1.71%
Kisandal	2.42%	1,191	1,020	16.76%	2.99%
Magcaalam	2.27%	1,115	1,121	-0.54%	-0.10%
Mahongcog	3.81%	1,875	2,274	-17.55%	-3.61%
Manobisa	3.48%	1,711	1,507	13.54%	2.45%
Manobo	5.76%	2,832	2,389	18.54%	3.29%
Noa	3.58%	1,759	1,402	25.46%	4.41%
Owas	1.43%	705	728	-3.16%	-0.61%
Pangao‑an	5.08%	2,499	2,237	11.71%	2.13%
Poblacion	13.92%	6,849	5,693	20.31%	3.58%
Sallab	3.07%	1,509	1,475	2.31%	0.43%
Tagbac	3.45%	1,699	1,622	4.75%	0.89%
Temporan	2.95%	1,453	1,383	5.06%	0.94%
Magpet Total		49,201	45,183	8.89%	1.64%

Annual population growth rate is at 1.64%. According to the 2015 Census, the age group with the highest population in Magpet is 5 to 9, with 6,076 individuals. The age group with the lowest population is 80 and over, with 330 individuals.

== Natural attractions ==
- Towsuvan Falls located at the foothills of Mount Apo in the town of Magpet. Crystal-clear water that offer a cool respite to a trek through lush forests, with a 20–30 metres (66–98 ft) drop of water with a natural pool. Its temperature may drop to 6 °C (43 °F) at night.
- Kirongdong Falls and Rainforests located at Kinarum, Magpet, with a drop of water between 70 and 80 metres (230 and 260 ft) surrounded by mountain ranges and cliffs.
- Mabu Falls and Rainforest located at Manobo, Magpet. About 120 metres (390 ft) high waterfalls and blessed with bed of flowers and century Cinnamon and Almaciga trees in the surroundings.
- Manobo Tribal Village located at Manobo, Magpet. It is one of the entry point to Mt. Apo via Lake Venado.
- Sitio Dallag Tribal Village located at Manobo, Magpet. It has an area of 400 hectares (990 acres) and nestled at about 400 metres (1,300 ft) above sea level and it is inhabited with indigenous Obo Manobo tribes.

== Select recognitions ==
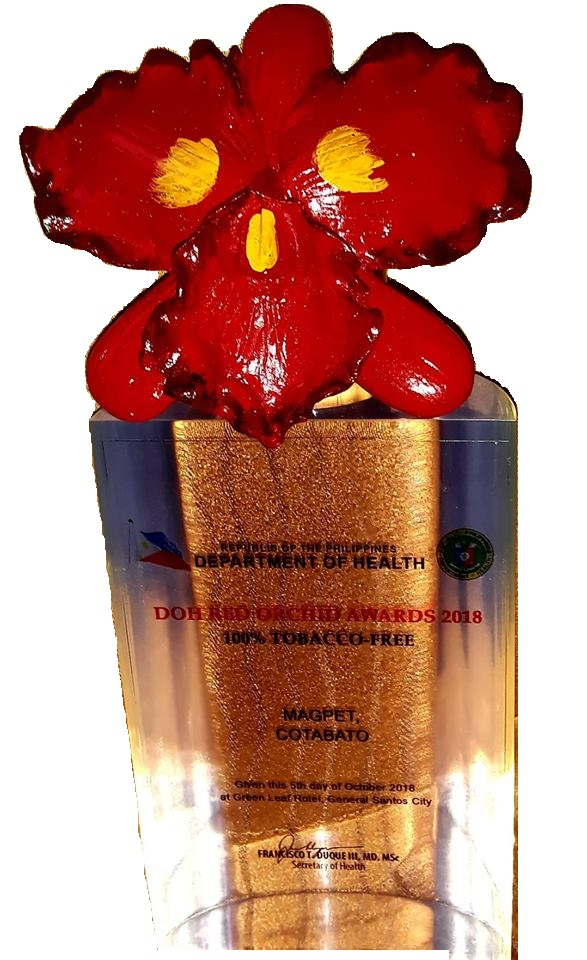
Magpet Red Orchid Award 2018

- 2011 Seal of Good Housekeeping (Department of the Interior and Local Government)
- 2015 Seal of Good Local Governance (Department of the Interior and Local Government)
- 2018 Seal of Good Local Governance (Department of the Interior and Local Government)
- 2018 Red Orchid Award (Department of Health)
- 2018 National Anti-Drug Abuse Council Performance Award (Department of the Interior and Local Government)
- 2019 Red Orchid Award (Department of Health)
