= Radyo Bomba =

Philippine radio station

Kidapawan; Philippines
- Broadcast area: Eastern Cotabato and surrounding areas
- Frequency: 99.5 MHz
- Branding: 99.5 Radyo Bomba

Programming
- Languages: Cebuano, Filipino
- Format: Contemporary MOR, News, Talk

Ownership
- Owner: DRG Broadcasting Network

History
- First air date: 2016

Technical information
- Power: 5,000 watts

99.5 Radyo Bomba (99.5 FM) is a radio station owned and operated by DRG Broadcasting Network. The station's studio and transmitter are located in Kidapawan.
