= New Israel, Makilala =

Barangay in Makilala, Philippines

New Israel
- Barangay
- Country: Philippines
- Region: Soccsksargen
- Province: Cotabato
- Municipality: Makilala

Population (2024)
  - Total: 1,962

New Israel is a barangay in the municipality of Makilala, in the island of Mindanao, Philippines. In 2024, its population was 1,962.

== New Israel Eco-Adventure Park ==
The barangay's main attraction is the New Israel Eco-Adventure Park, where hundreds of long-tailed macaques live alongside humans, and where Asia's longest zipline can be found. It is located at the base of Mount Apo.
