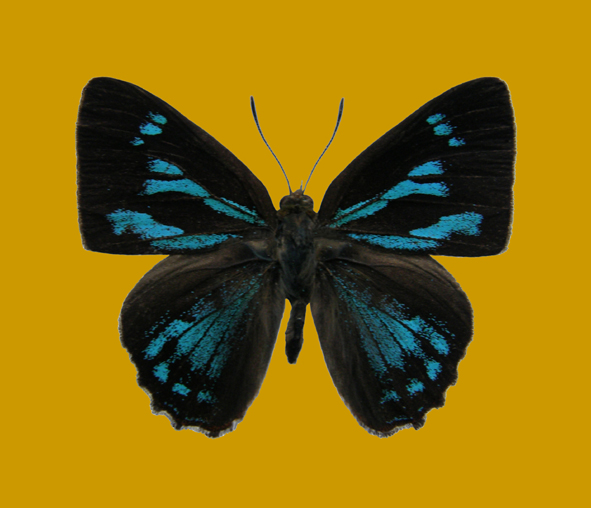
- Male upperside
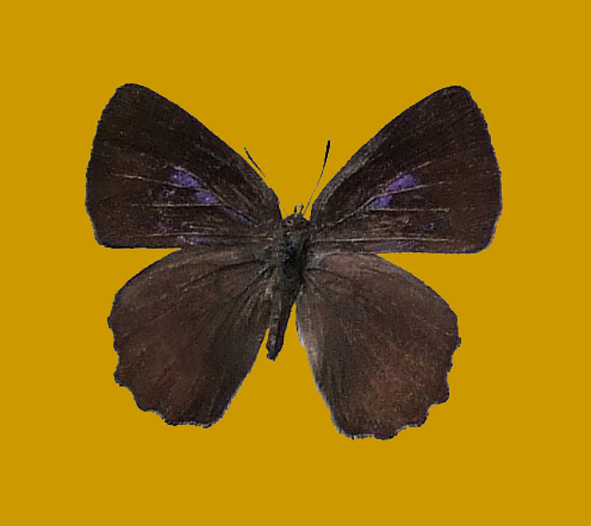
- Female upperside

Scientific classification
- Domain: Eukaryota
- Kingdom: Animalia
- Phylum: Arthropoda
- Class: Insecta
- Order: Lepidoptera
- Family: Lycaenidae
- Genus: Deramas
- Species: D. tomokoae

Binomial name
- Deramas tomokoae H. Hayashi, 1978

= Deramas tomokoae =

Species of butterfly

Deramas tomokoae is a butterfly of the family Lycaenidae. It is found on Mindanao in the Philippines.

Etymology. The specific name is dedicated to Tomoko HAYASHI, the wife of the author.

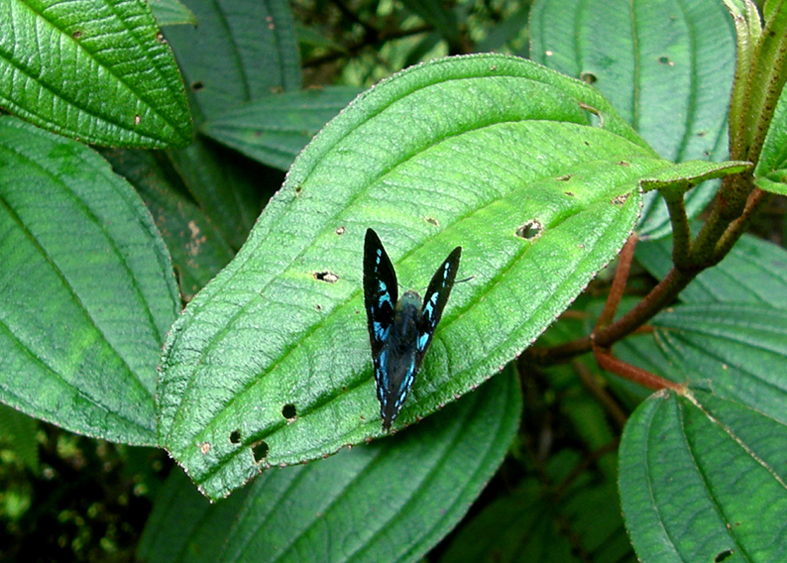
Male, Mount Apo, Mindanao

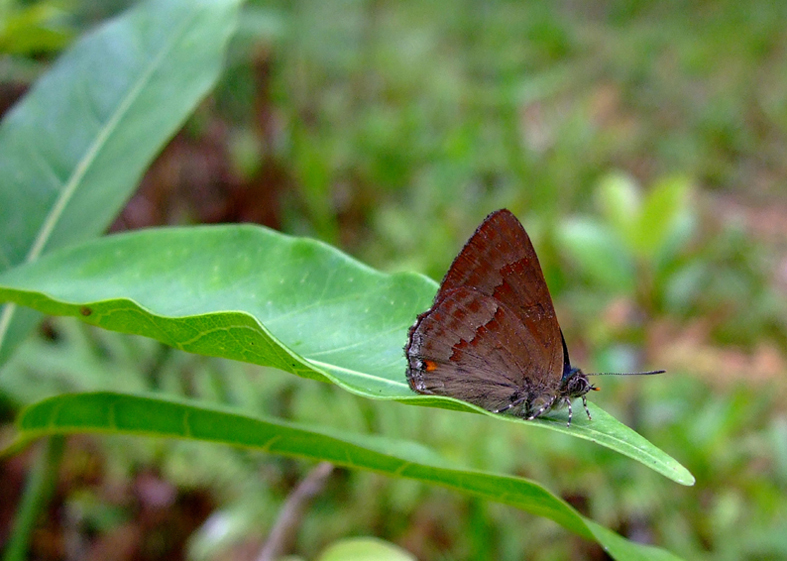
Male, Mount Apo
