= Kidapawan =

Capital city of Cotabato, Philippines

- Component city
- City of Kidapawan
- Kidapawan City Hall

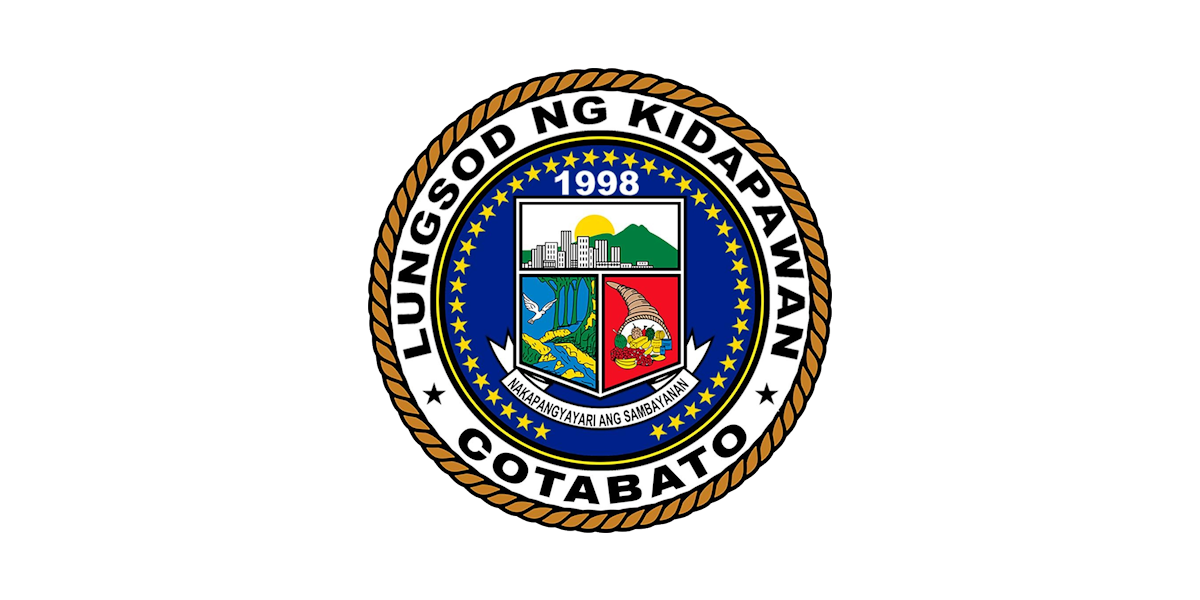
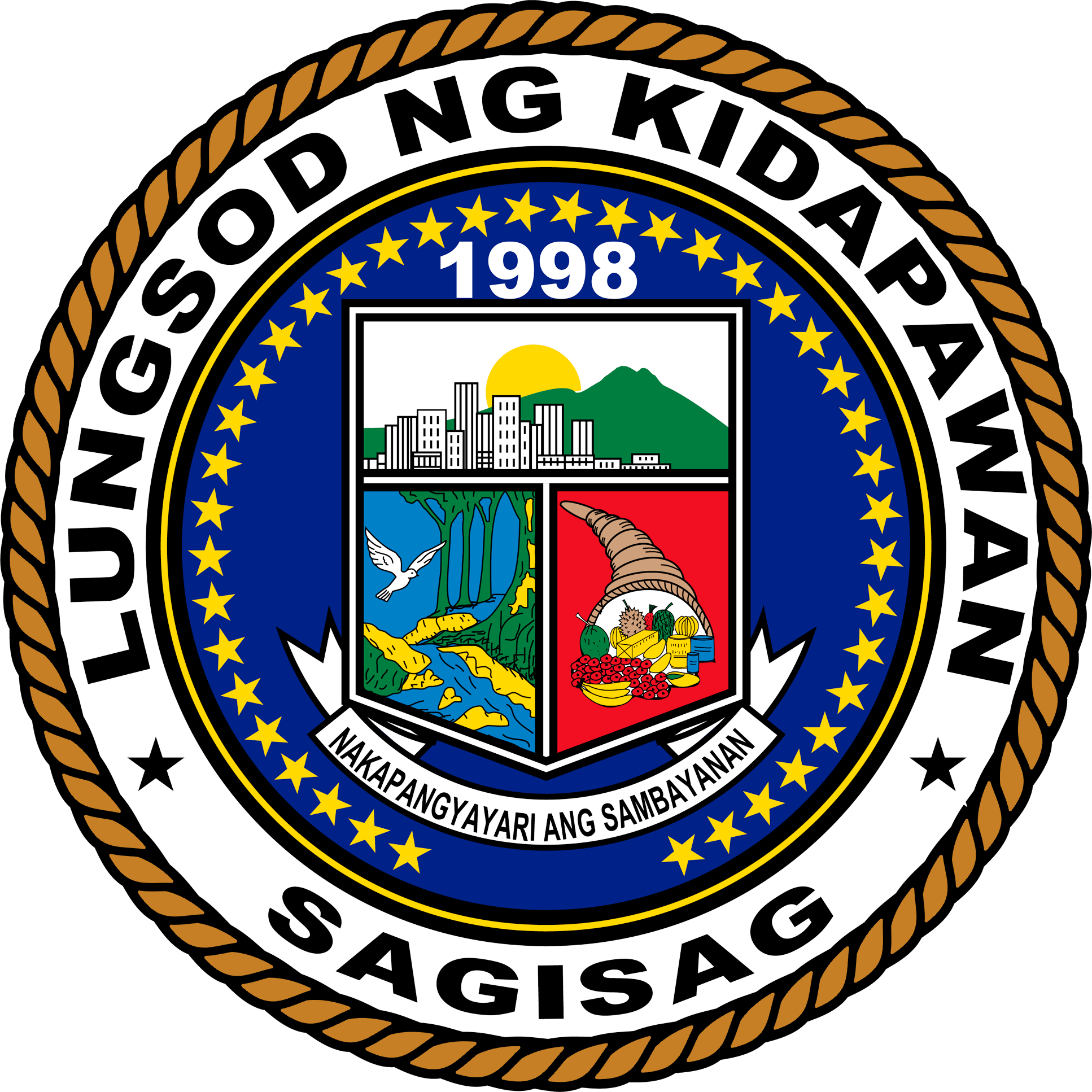
- Flag Seal
- Nickname: City of Fruits and Highland Springs
- Motto: "Nakapangyayari ang Sambayanan" (The People are Sovereign)
- Map of Cotabato with Kidapawan highlighted
- Interactive map of Kidapawan
- Location within the Philippines
- Coordinates: 7°00′30″N 125°05′22″E
- Country: Philippines
- Region: Soccsksargen
- Province: Cotabato
- District: 2nd district
- Founded: July 23, 1914
- Chartered: August 18, 1947
- Cityhood: February 12, 1998
- Barangays: 40 (see Barangays)

Government
  - Type: Sangguniang Panlungsod
  - Mayor: Jose Paolo M. Evangelista
  - Vice Mayor: Melvin E. Lamata Jr
  - Representative: Rudy S. Caoagdan
  - City Council: Members: Rosheil Gantuangco Zoreta; Airene Clare Pagal; Dina Y. Espina-Chua; Datu Jason Roy Sibug; Mike Ablang; Judith G. Navarra; Aljo Cris G. Dizon; Galen Rey T. Lonzaga; Carlo C. Agamon; Francis E. Palmones Jr
  - Electorate: 96,335 voters (2025)

Area
  - Total: 358.47 km^{2} (138.41 sq mi)
- Highest elevation: 2,933 m (9,623 ft)
- Lowest elevation: 30 m (98 ft)

Population (2024 census)
  - Total: 160,864
  - Density: 448.75/km^{2} (1,162.3/sq mi)
  - Households: 39,891
- Demonym(s): Kidapaweño; Kidapawanon

Economy
  - Income class: 1st city income class
  - Poverty incidence: 13.49% (2023)
  - Revenue: ₱ 1,156 million (2024)
  - Assets: ₱ 3,392 million (2024)
  - Expenditure: ₱ 869.2 million (2024)
  - Liabilities: ₱ 1,409 million (2024)

Service provider
  - Electricity: Cotabato Electric Cooperative (COTELCO)
- Time zone: UTC+8 (PST)
- ZIP code: 9400
- PSGC: 124704000
- IDD : area code: +63 (0)64
- Native languages: Hiligaynon; Cebuano; Tagabawa; Obo; Ilianen; Tagalog; Maguindanaon
- Website: kidapawancity.gov.ph

Kidapawan, officially the City of Kidapawan (Note: Cebuano: Dakbayan sa Kidapawan; Hiligaynon: Dakbanwa sang Kidapawan; Maguindanaon: Kuta nu Kidapawan; Obo Monuvu: Ingod to Kidapawan; Filipino: Lungsod ng Kidapawan), is a component city and the capital of the province of Cotabato, Philippines.

From 3rd income class, it was reclassified as a 1st income class city on 1 January 2025. Moreover, according to the 2024 Census, it has a population of 160,864 people making it the most populous in the province.

It is located at the foot of Mount Apo, the country's highest mountain.

== Etymology ==
Many proposed etymologies have been recorded to explain the origin of Kidapawan's name over the decades.

In 2017, Karlo Antonio Galay David gathered all written and oral explanations from archival sources and tribal key informants. Galay David gathered thirteen proposed etymologies, and of these thirteen, six are about springs, three are about weddings, three are about highlands, two are names, and three are directional and imply the act of going.

Possible origins of the name 'Kidapawan'
Etymology	Source Language	Translation or Explanation	Source(s)
‘kida pawan’	Obo Monuvu (faulty)	‘to live near’ + ‘a spring in the highland’	‘Kidapawan’ by Lino Madrid (from the 1952 Cotabato Guidebook)
(no original presented)	~	A spring in Tagbak, Magpet, (said to be a center of trade)	‘Legend of Kidapawan’ mimeograph (archival document in the Kidapawan library, written c. 1960s)
Kida and Pawan	~	A Primeval couple	Legend of Kidapawan’ mimeograph
Lapawan	Obo Monuvu	‘Wedding ceremony,’ (because Kidapawan was an auspicious place to be married in)	Legend of Kidapawan’ mimeograph
(Datu) Kidapawan	Obo Monuvu	A name, meaning ‘to go yonder and stay’ or ‘stay and go further above,’ (Datu Kidapawan, son of Datu Tambunawan or Datu Mamalu, leader of an exodus of people from ‘Kabakan’ escape Islamization)	Legend of Kidapawan’ mimeograph; Gabriela Eleosida's 1961 Master's thesis (University of Manila)
‘tida pawan’	Obo Monuvu (faulty)	‘spring’ + ‘highland’	‘Sketch of Kidapawan’ by Melerio Robles (1972), most local government material
Tiddopawan	Obo Monuvu	‘spring,’ literally ‘to flow over something’ (referring to a spring in Baranggay Paco)	Tribal source Apo Salomay Iyong (as quoted by tribal source Retchor Umpan)
tigdapawan	Obo Monuvu	‘spring’ (in reference to a spring in Tagbak, Magpet, near which Datu Siawan Ingkal was born, the name was given by Datu Siawan)	Tribal source Datu Basinon Ebboy
Linapawan	Obo Monuvu	‘Marrying place’ (because Kidapawan was famous among tribes as a good source of brides)	Tribal source Apo Meding Ligue Mampo (as quoted by Bo-i Jenifer Pia Sibug Las)
‘tida pawan tuay salirok’	Obo Monuvu	‘let us go uphill to the spring spout,’ referring to a spring in the property of Datu Siawan Ingkal in Baranggay Manongol	As quoted by Bernardo Piñol Jr, 2018 (quoting a gathering of tribal leaders assembled in the early 2000s)
(not provided)	Obo Monuvu	‘The meeting of rivers’	Tribal source Ambayon Mundog (as quoted by Rita Gadi)
Nakapawan	Maguindanaon	‘where are you going?’	Tribal source Datu Boy Ayog
Kinabpawang	Maguindanaon	‘place arrived at’	Pikit Councilor Benjar Ali Modale

== History ==
=== Establishment and territorial changes ===
Kidapawan has roots in the municipal district with the same name which was created in 1914 by the Americans, and consisted the territory of the Monuvu. Datu Siawan Ingkal, a tribal leader, was appointed District President. Later, Ilonggo settlers increased in the area.

Through Executive Order No. 82 signed by President Manuel Roxas on August 18, 1947, which organized almost all municipal districts of Cotabato into ten municipalities, Kidapawan was among those converted, merging with it the unexplored region in the north, as well as the then-forested M'lang-Tulunan area, a Maguindanaon territory in the southeast border. The territory extended to the borders of the provinces of Bukidnon and then-undivided Davao through Matanao River, to the north and the east, respectively; Kabacan to the west, meeting with Pulangi River; and M'lang area, then part of Buluan, and the Ligawasan Marsh, to the south.

As a result, the size was more than thrice the present. The vast area in its extent was once described in the 1950s being larger than the province of Cavite. The original territory, now called the Greater Kidapawan Area and currently includes the city itself and eight—five daughter and three granddaughter—municipalities (including part of Matalam), occupies more than half of the present-day Cotabato, in the northern and eastern part. It also composed the portion of Bansalan east of the Matanao River.

It was partitioned gradually over the next two decades with the establishment of separate municipalities:

- M'lang (1951) in the south, which included the present-day territory of Tulunan.
- Makilala (1954) and Magpet (1963) in the east; the latter is Kidapawan's largest single loss of territory to date, included the present-day territory of Arakan.
- Matalam (1961) in the west, with taken territory merged with that from M'lang and Kabacan; included the present-day territory of Antipas.
- President Roxas (1967) in the north.

With the partitions, the municipality lost all its original borders, although it shares Mount Apo with Davao and four other towns.

The partitioning was almost opposed, mainly because of the possibility of becoming a city. The municipal council petitioned to change the border of Makilala, and even urged President Diosdado Macapagal to cancel the establishment of Matalam; but both were unsuccessful.

=== Events from the pre-colonial era until pre-cityhood ===
Kidapawan has its roots in pre-colonial settlements of the Obo Monuvu, the indigenous peoples that have lived at the foot of Mount Apo on both the Cotabato and Davao sides for generations. The Monuvu, along with other tribes in the area with whom they frequently intermarried, remained independent throughout the Spanish colonial period, as the Spaniards were never able to surmount Mount Apo on the Davao side nor penetrate beyond the Ligawasan Marsh on the Cotabato side. The chieftains of the tribes in the Greater Kidapawan Area remained independent but maintained relations with the nearby Maguindanaon sultanates, the closest of which were the Sultanate of Buayan in Dulawan (present-day Datu Piang, Maguindanao del Sur), and its related settlement, the Sultanate of Bagua Inged in what is today Pikit and Pagalungan. The Monuvu settlements, the precursors of many of Kidapawan's modern day Baranggays, existed autonomously with one another but were ruled by chieftains often related by centuries of intermarriage.

Some time before the coming of the Americans, the different tribal settlements west of the Matanao river apparently fell under the influence of a Datu Ingkal (in some sources he is named Datu Ingkal Ugok), who became paramount chieftain over the different settlements within the Kidapawan area. When the Americans came they recognized Datu Ingkal's leadership, and records say he was appointed ‘Capitan’ by a Col. Stevens in 1908, presumably as head of a tribal ward under what was then the Cotabato District of the Moro Province

When Datu Ampatuan of Maganoy threatened to stage a rebellion against the Americans in 1913, Datu Ingkal is recorded as threatening to side with him. The Americans sought to pacify the two datus by offering appointments and administrative arrangements.

Datu Ingkal's territory, Kidapawan, would be formed into a Municipal District on July 23, 1914, one of twenty seven under the newly created Cotabato Province of the Department of Mindanao and Sulu as mandated under Article 19 of Act No. 2408. Datu Siawan Ingkal, son of Datu Ingkal Ugok, would be appointed Municipal District President. The act was made official with Act No. 2711 approved on March 10, 1917, mentioning Kidapawan as a municipal district. The Cornejo Commonwealth Directory of 1939, published under the newly elected Quezon government, still names Datu Siawan as District President, with Datu Amag Madut as vice president.

Kidapawan's establishment as a Municipal District paved the way for settlers from Luzon and Visayas to come over the succeeding decades up until the 1960s. Kidapawan was not a planned colony, but it was surrounded by planned colonies on both sides, thus encouraging individual migration: Davao, a Spanish colony in the late 1800s, Pikit, an agricultural colony set up by the Americans, the settlements of the National Land Settlement Administration (NLSA) in what is today South Cotabato, and much later the colony of Alamada under Magsaysay's National Resettlement and Rehabilitation Administration (NARRA). The diverse ethnic composition of Kidapawan's settler population, with Cebuanos, Tagalogs, Ilonggos, Chinese, and Igorots, reflect both the gradual individual efforts of migrants and Kidapawan's position as the transition area between Cebuano-dominated Davao and Ilonggo-dominated Cotabato.

There are conflicting accounts as to where the original center of Kidapawan was before the War. Tribal and settler sources name either Manongol (for a time called ‘Old Kidapawan’) or Lanao as centers, with some sources identifying Lanao as the commercial center of the town where the settlers concentrated, with Manongol the seat of Siawan Ingkal's chieftaincy.

The details of Kidapawan's arrangements during the Second World War are unclear, but it seems to have been one of the Municipal Districts elevated in 1942 to Municipality by virtue of Executive Order No. 43 of the Japanese-sponsored Executive Commission.

No records attest to it, but informants (primary among them Rosita Blanco Cadungog) names Filomeno Blanco as the local appointed Mayor by the Japanese during their occupation of Kidapawan. There are even less details on the arrangements of the resistance government, but Kidapawan fell under the command of Datu Udtog Matalam, who with his Bolo Battalion led the Cotabato region's guerrilla movement. Records indicate that in 1942 Alfonso O. Angeles Sr. had been appointed ‘Mayor of the Upper Cotabato Sector,’ to which Kidapawan presumably belonged, while the Paclibar family describes a ‘Civil Emergency Administration’ in M’lang under the 118th Infantry Regiment of the 106th Division of Wendell Fertig's 10th Military District (the resistance detachment in Mindanao during the War), headed by Jacinto Paclibar.

When the War ended, Kidapawan's administrative status was in limbo, but in all likelihood it was reverted to Municipal District. No documents also confirm it, but informants like Erlinda Villanueva Asuelo name Ceferino J. Villanueva as acting mayor after the War up to the election of 1947.

The election of 1947 resulted in the victory of Alfonso O. Angeles Sr. The first elected Vice Mayor was Datu Siawan Ingkal, while the first elected Councilors were Gil dela Cruz, Lorenzo A. Saniel, Lino Madrid, Ricardo Ipong, Norberto Cajucom, and Arsenio Sibug. The first Municipal Government began functioning in 1948.

When the second partitioning of the Empire Province of Cotabato happened in the 1970s, Kidapawan became the provincial capital of North Cotabato by virtue of Presidential Decree No. 341, issued by Ferdinand Marcos on November 22, 1973. (North Cotabato was later renamed to Cotabato through Batas Pambansa Blg. 660 on March 7, 1984. Colloquially, the two names are used interchangeably today.)

=== Cityhood ===
The local government had made efforts for Kidapawan's cityhood, since as early as 1952, when then mayor Alfonso Angeles Sr. made an unsuccessful attempt to merge Kabacan with the huge, historical municipality; and especially upon the municipality's designation as the provincial capital.

These were only achieved when Kidapawan was eventually converted through Republic Act No. 8500, signed on February 12, 1998, becoming the province's first and only component city to date. Luis Malaluan became the first city mayor.

== Geography ==
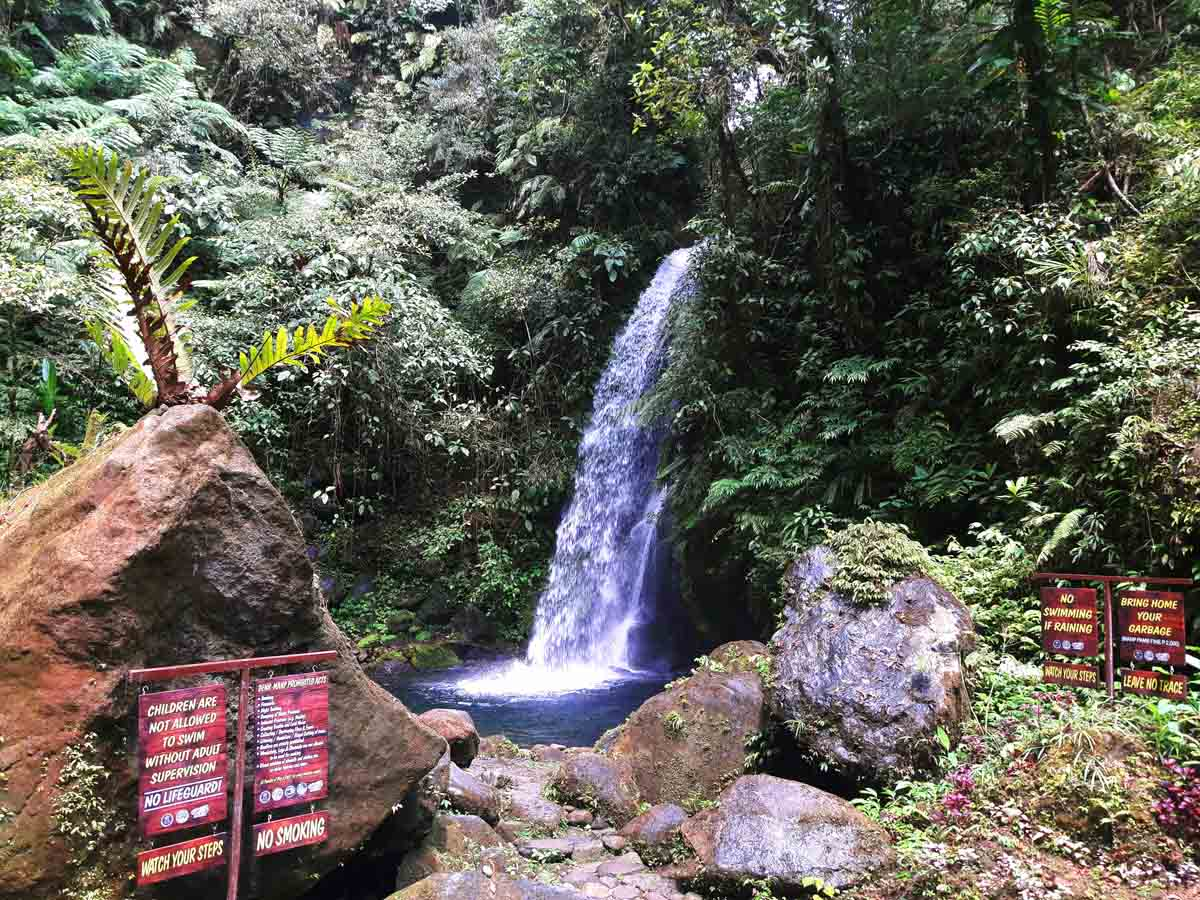
Paniki Falls

Kidapawan is located at the foot of Mount Apo, in southeastern Cotabato province, in the middle of the four major Mindanaoan cities of General Santos, Davao, Cotabato and Cagayan de Oro. It shares its borders with the Cotabato towns of Magpet and Pres. Roxas to the north, Makilala to the south, Matalam to the west and M'lang to the southwest.

Kidapawan covers a total land area of 358.47 square kilometres (138.41 sq mi). Its land area is mostly flat, except for the increasingly hilly and mountainous regions to the northeast near Mount Apo, the highest point in the Philippines. The Kabacan River has its source in the northeastern part of the city and flows through its northern border with Magpet town.

=== Barangays ===
The city of Kidapawan is politically subdivided into 40 barangays. Each barangay can be further subdivided into puroks and sitios.

- Amas
- Amazion
- Balabag
- Balindog
- Binoligan
- Birada
- Gayola
- Ginatilan
- Ilomavis
- Indangan
- Junction
- Kalaisan
- Kalasuyan
- Katipunan
- Lanao
- Linangcob
- Luvimin
- Macabolig
- Magsaysay
- Malinan
- Manongol
- Marbel (Embac)
- Mateo
- Meochao
- Mua-an
- New Bohol
- Nuangan
- Onica
- Paco
- Patadon (Patadon East)
- Perez
- Poblacion
- San Isidro
- San Roque
- Santo Niño
- Sibawan
- Sikitan
- Singao
- Sudapin
- Sumbac

=== Climate ===
Climate data for Kidapawan
Month	Jan	Feb	Mar	Apr	May	Jun	Jul	Aug	Sep	Oct	Nov	Dec	Year
Mean daily maximum °C (°F)	29 (84)	29 (84)	30 (86)	31 (88)	29 (84)	28 (82)	28 (82)	28 (82)	29 (84)	29 (84)	29 (84)	29 (84)	29 (84)
Mean daily minimum °C (°F)	20 (68)	20 (68)	21 (70)	22 (72)	22 (72)	22 (72)	22 (72)	22 (72)	22 (72)	22 (72)	22 (72)	21 (70)	22 (71)
Average precipitation mm (inches)	51 (2.0)	41 (1.6)	38 (1.5)	45 (1.8)	82 (3.2)	108 (4.3)	114 (4.5)	120 (4.7)	95 (3.7)	96 (3.8)	76 (3.0)	52 (2.0)	918 (36.1)
Average rainy days	13.2	12.0	13.8	15.3	22.5	23.9	25.2	25.4	23.3	24.1	21.0	16.8	236.5
Source: Meteoblue

Kidapawan lies outside the typhoon belt and has a mild climate characterized by wet and dry seasons. The coldest months are December and January. The hottest are April and May.

== Demographics ==
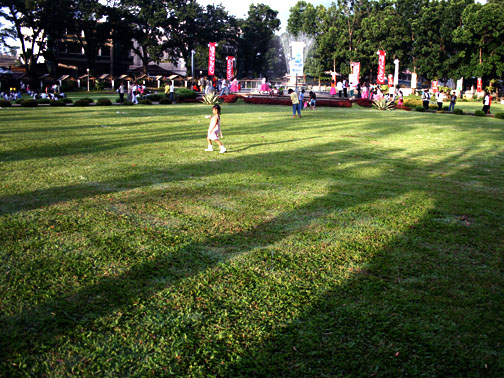
Kidapawan City Plaza

Population census of Kidapawan
Year	Pop.	±% p.a.
1918	4,027	—
1939	12,593	+5.58%
1948	31,644	+10.78%
1960	61,675	+5.72%
1970	46,820	−2.71%
1975	46,720	−0.04%
1980	54,864	+3.26%
1990	74,190	+3.06%
1995	87,758	+3.20%
2000	101,205	+3.10%
2007	117,610	+2.09%
2010	125,447	+2.38%
2015	140,195	+2.14%
2020	160,791	+2.93%
2024	160,864	+0.01%
Source: Philippine Statistics Authority

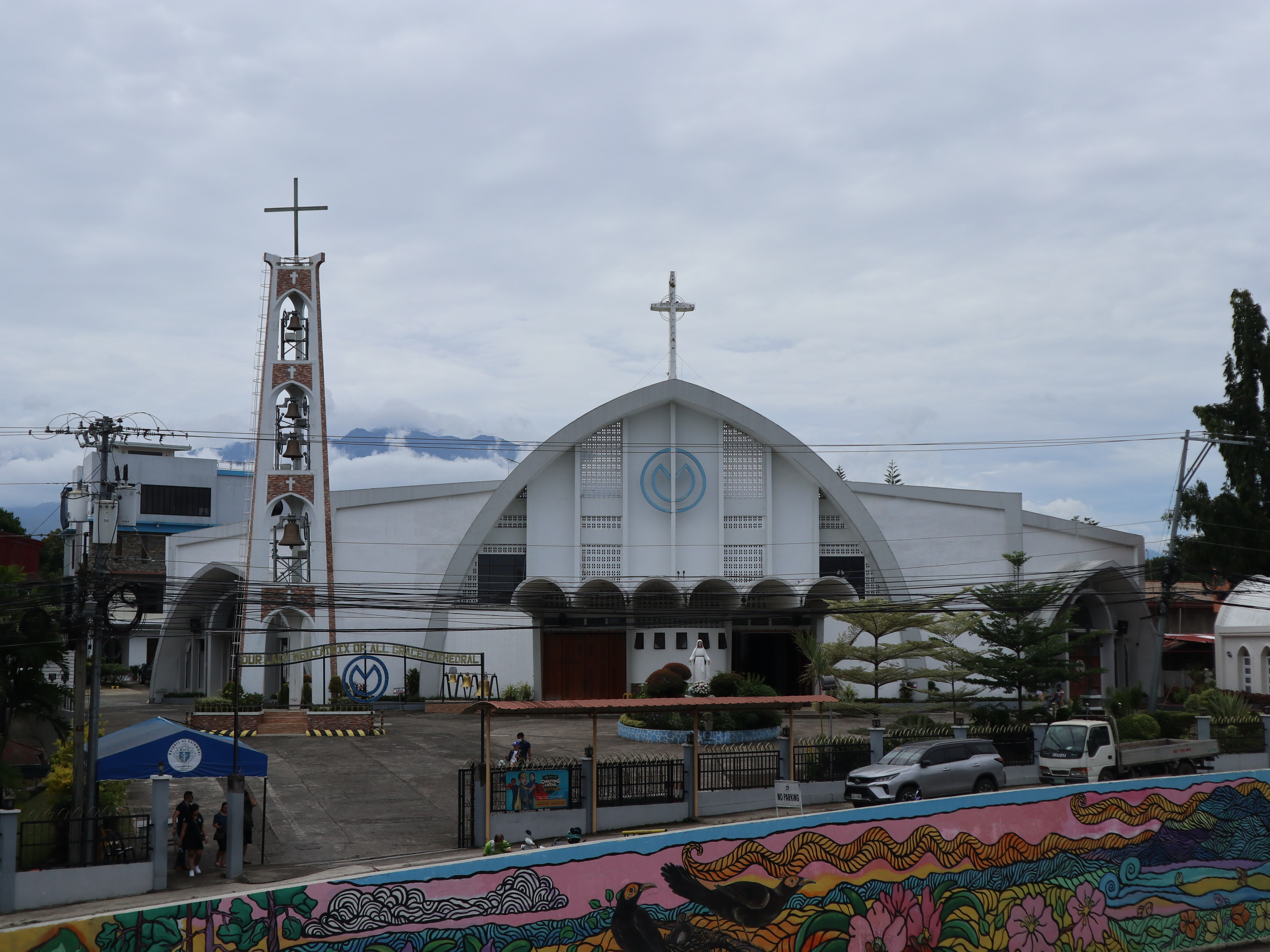
Our Lady Mediatrix of All Grace Cathedral

In the 2024 census, Kidapawan had a population of 160,864, with a density of 450 inhabitants per square kilometre or 1,200 inhabitants per square mile.

Meanwhile, in the 2015 census, the city had a total population of 140,195 inhabitants, from 125,447 in 2010 and 117,610 from in 2007. Inhabitants are predominantly Christian, though there are also significant Muslim populations in the city.

Obo Monuvu, Cebuanos and Hiligaynons are the major ethnic groups in the city. Other ethnic groups residing in the area are the Maguindanaons, Ilocanos and Manobo groups of Obo, Ilianen, and Tagabawa.

Cebuano is the most widely spoken language, especially in the city proper. English is used as the medium of instruction in schools and other learning institutions; it is also predominantly used in major government agencies in their transactions and reports. Laws and ordinances in the city are all written in English. Some of the other languages spoken include Obo Monuvu (the city's indigenous language) Maguindanaon, Meranaw, Ilianen, and Tagabawa.

== Government ==
Portions of the Kidapawan City Hall

The city of Kidapawan is governed by a city mayor, the city's local chief executive and administrative officer, along with a city vice mayor. The Sangguniang Panlungsod serves as the local legislative body of the city.

Kidapawan is also the seat of the provincial government of Cotabato, with the provincial capitol located at Barangay Amas in the western part of the city.

=== List of former chief executives ===
American appointed ‘Capitan’ of Kidapawan

- Datu Ingkal Ugok ( 1908 - ?)

Appointed President of the Municipal District of Kidapawan

- Datu Siawan Ingkal (1914 - ? )

Civilian heads during and after the Second World War

- Datu Siawan Ingkal (1942- ?) (as sitting Municipal District President)
- Filomeno Blanco (1942-?) (appointed by the Imperial Japanese Army)
- Jacinto Paclibar (1942-?) (as head of Civil Service Administration in M'lang)
- Ceferino Villanueva (1947) (Postwar Mayor appointed in OIC capacity by Udtog Matalam)

Elected and appointed mayors of the Municipality and City of Kidapawan

- Alfonso O. Angeles Sr. (1948 – 1955) (1964-1967)
- Dr. Gil F. Gadi (1956 – resigned 1957)
- Lorenzo A. Saniel (Vice Mayor, assumed 1957 – 1959)
- Dr. Alberto F. Madriguera (1960 – 1962, removed by electoral protest)
- Dr. Emma B. Gadi (won electoral protest in 1963) (1968-1971)
- Atty. Juan G. Sibug (Vice Mayor, assumed September – December 1967)
- Augusto R. Gana (1972 - 1986) (1988-1992)
- Florante L. Respicio (1986 – 1988, Appointed OIC by Corazon Aquino Government)
- Domingo B. Landicho (December 1988, Appointed OIC when Respicio resigned)
- Joseph A. Evangelista (1992-1994) (2013–2022)
- Dr. Luis P. Malaluan (1994 – 2004)
- Rodolfo Y. Gantuangco (2004 – 2013)
- Atty Jose Paolo M. Evangelista (2022–present)

== Economy ==
Poverty incidence of Kidapawan (%)

Source: Philippine Statistics Authority

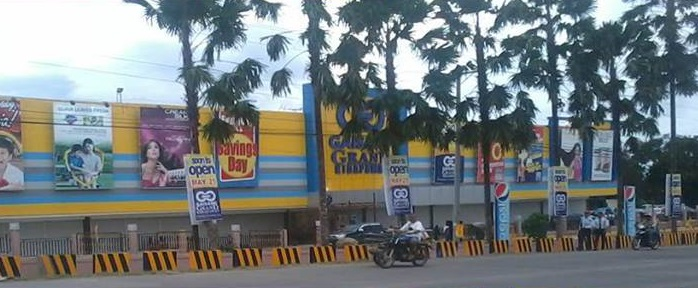
Gaisano Grand Mall of Kidapawan

The city is considered as the province's industrial hub, and plays a pivotal role in the economic development of the province and its adjacent areas. It is the commercial and trading hub of eastern Cotabato province as it lies at the heart of three large domestic markets of Davao City, General Santos, and Cotabato City.

=== Commercial retail centers ===
The city of Kidapawan boasts the most number of shopping and retail centers in the whole province of Cotabato. Gaisano Grand Mall of Kidapawan, the largest shopping center in the city, is located at Barangay Lanao in the northern part of the city's urban core, while the KMCC Shopping Center is located at Dayao St., deep into the city's main highway. Other retail centers include Davao Central Warehouse Club Inc. located south of the National Highway, and Survive Marketing located at Quezon Boulevard in the center of Poblacion.

=== Agriculture ===
Kidapawan is home to the Dole-Stanfilco Banana Plantation and Palletizing Facility, which is under the management of Dole Philippines, itself a subsidiary of the American food producer Dole Food Company. The said plantation, which also had its holdings on neighboring towns Makilala and Matalam, is the largest in the province of Cotabato. With this, the city is an international exporter of bananas.

The flower industry is a major source of income for some residents of Kidapawan. Ornamental and forest tree seedlings, as well as flowers such as roses, anthuriums, and orchids, are grown locally.

Crops abundantly grown in the city include abaca, rubber, maize, rice, coconut, and vegetables.

=== Cotabato City-Kidapawan City (CK) Agri-industrial and Eco Tourism Corridor ===
The Cotabato City-Kidapawan City (CK) Agri-industrial and Eco Tourism Corridor is projected by the NEDA Region 12. The primary growth node in this corridor is Cotabato City with Kidapawan City and Midsayap as intermediate urban centers.

Cotabato City as the primary urban center in this corridor, serves as the institutional, financial and service center, also the center of public health with the existence of the Cotabato Regional and Medical Center, and the de facto capital of BARMM. The city is a special economic zone is expected to diversify its economic base and will facilitate the creation of more investment and job opportunities.

Cotabato Province ranks first in the region in rice and rubber production, second in corn and produces organic coco sugar and delicious tropical fruits. It hosts processing plants for palm oil, sugar cane and rubber. The Mount Apo Geothermal Power Plant in Kidapawan City generates 106 megawatts.

== Tourism ==
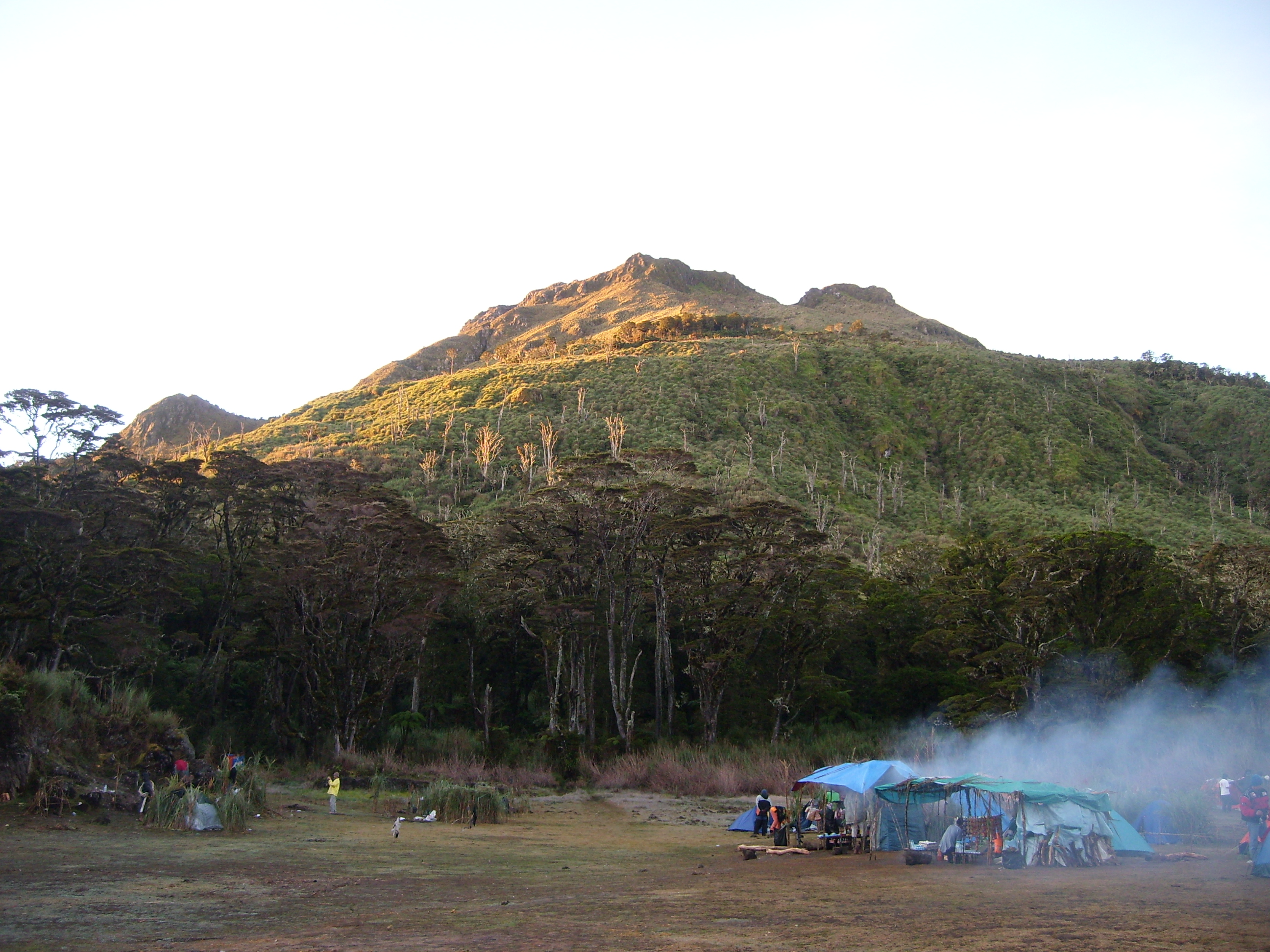
Foot of Mt. Apo

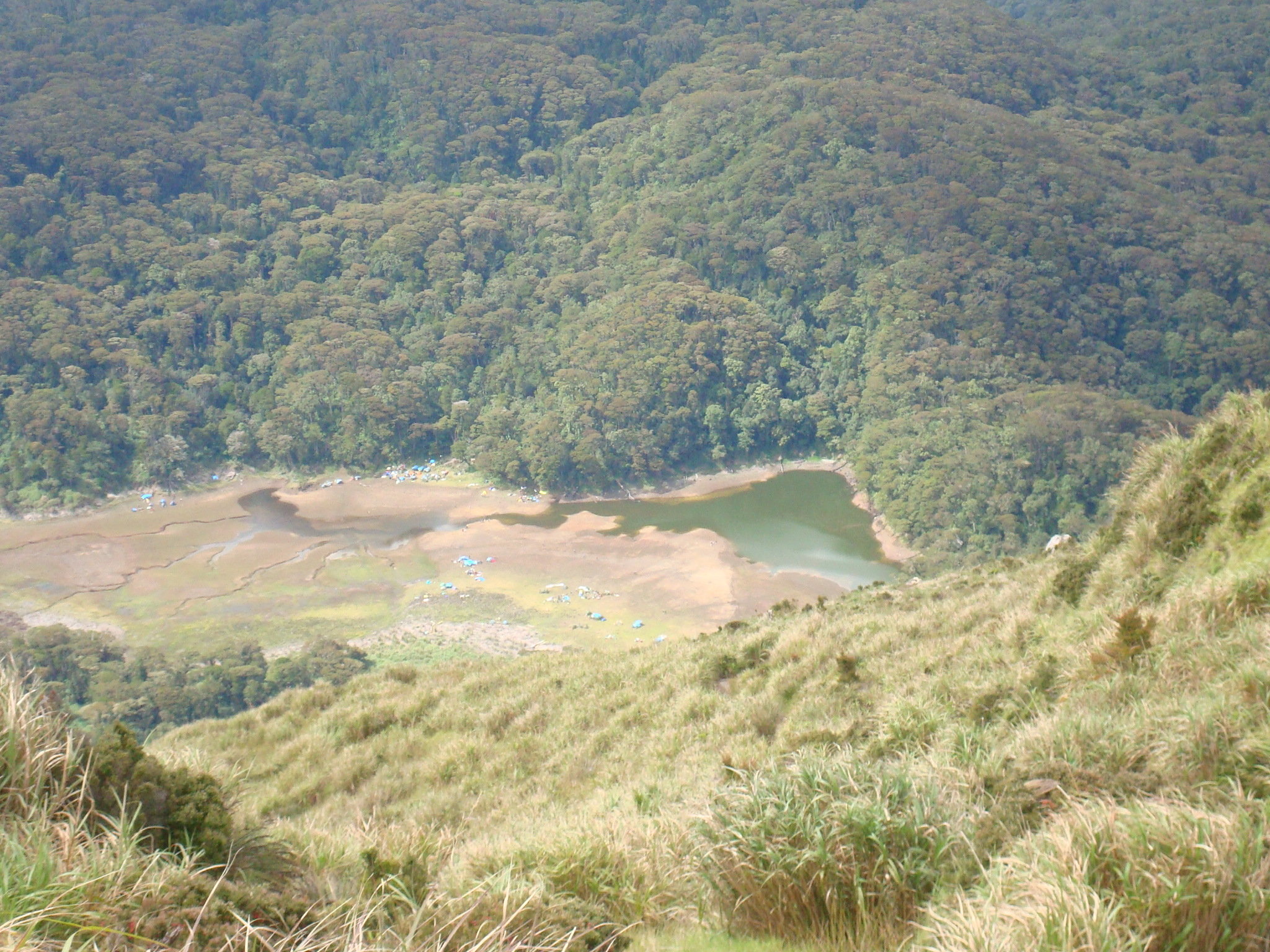
Lake Venado

Located at Umpan Village, Barangay Balabag is the Paniki Falls Eco-River Park. Kidapawan is also one of the well-known starting points for trekking on the Mount Apo, via the city's Lake Agco in Barangay Ilomavis, and the Kidapawan-Santa Cruz, and Kidapawan-Magpet trails, towering at 10,311 feet (3,143 m) above sea level with a total area of 14.6 square metres (157 sq ft). The country's tallest mountain is an abode to the almost extinct Philippine eagle.

Within the Mt. Apo Natural Park is the Mandarangan Geological Site, which is being promoted as a major educational tourism site. Lake Venado, hidden among the mountain ranges, stands at an elevation of 7,200 feet (2,200 m) above sea level.

Another tourist destination is Kansal Falls at Sitio Lapaan in Barangay Perez, in the eastern part of the city. The water from the Kansal Falls is one of the sources for the Metro Kidapawan Water District, the main water utility provider in the city. The water rushing through Kansal Falls comes from the various mountain springs of Mt. Apo.

=== Events ===
Often dubbed as the Second Fruit Basket of the Philippines, the city holds the Timpupo, its annual fruit festival, every August. During the feast, which was first held in 2001, the city expresses gratitude for the abundance of its fruit harvest. The city government often purchases large quantities of local fruit, which are laid out on tables along the streets for visitors and residents to enjoy.

Kidapawan also celebrates its Foundation Anniversary every August 18 (the same day as the Timpupo celebrations) to commemorate its establishment into a municipality on August 18, 1947. Meanwhile, the city celebrates its Charter Day on February 12 to mark the day when the then-municipality of Kidapawan became a city.

== Infrastructure ==
=== Transportation ===
Kidapawan is the transportation hub of eastern Cotabato province. It is the main highway junction for all of the province's eastern municipalities that are not situated on or passed through by the National Highway which spans the entire east-to-west length of the city. It also serves as the primary gateway and road junction to the towns of the Arakan Valley, namely Pres. Roxas, Antipas and Arakan.

Quezon Boulevard, the Paco-Arakan-Katipunan Highway, the Kidapawan-Magpet Highway, the Kidapawan-Kalaisan-Calunasan-Bialong-M'lang Highway, and the Kidapawan-Ilomavis-Agco Road are the major thoroughfares of the city.

Local public transportation is primarily served by almost 3,000 motor tricycles. In addition, multicabs and jeepneys provide transportation to barangays and nearby municipalities. Tricycles mainly serve the urban and suburban areas of the city.

The Kidapawan City Overland Terminal caters to passenger vans and buses that serve the city and certain areas in Soccsksargen, Bangsamoro, Zamboanga peninsula and Davao Region. Public utility vans also provide transportation to multiple destinations outside the city. Meanwhile, Mindanao Star, Davao Metro Shuttle and Yellow Bus Line operate buses in the city, offering routes to Cotabato, Davao, GenSan, Digos, Tacurong, and Zamboanga.

Kidapawan does not have an airport and relies on nearby airports for its air transport. The nearest airports to the city are Francisco Bangoy International Airport, about 115 km (71 mi) away, and Cotabato Airport, about 130 km (81 mi) away.

=== Utility ===
Metro Kidapawan Water District is the primary water service provider in the city, while Cotabato Electric Cooperative (Cotelco) supplies electricity. The Mount Apo Geothermal Power Plant, one of only three geothermal power plants in the Philippines, is located in Barangay Ilomavis in Kidapawan's hilly and geologically active northeastern areas.

=== Telecommunications ===
Metro Kidapawan Telephone Corporation is the main telephone and telecommunications company operating in Kidapawan. It has been managed by the Philippine Long Distance Telephone Company since 2015. Bayantel is another telecommunications provider in the city.

== Institutions ==
=== Education ===
The following is a partial list of some of the public and private basic education institutions in the city.

- ABC Educational Development Center
- Amas Central Elementary School
- Amas National High School
- Datu Umpan I.P School
- Felipe Suerte Memorial Elementary School
- Habitat Elementary School
- Isidoro S. Lonzaga Memorial Elementary School
- Kidapawan Anchor Bay Bible School
- Kidapawan City National High School (City High)
- Kidapawan City Pilot Elementary School SPED Center
- Kidapawan City Pilot Elementary School
- Kidapawan Jireh Christian School
- Kidapawan Southern Baptist Elementary School
- Kidapawan City SDA Elementary School
- Lanao Central Elementary School
- Linangkob National High School
- Marciano Mancera Memorial Elementary School
- Paco Central Elementary School
- Paco National High School
- Saniel-Cruz National High School
- School For Life Montessori
- Sibug Memorial Elementary School
- St. Mary's Academy of Kidapawan (formerly Notre Dame of Kidapawan for Girls)

Meanwhile, the following lists some universities and colleges in the city. Aside from offering tertiary education, some of these also offer basic education.

- University of Southern Mindanao (USM) - Kidapawan City Campus
- Central Mindanao Colleges (CMC)
- Colegio de Kidapawan (CDK)
- Kidapawan Doctors College, Inc. (KDCI)
- Kidapawan Polytechnic College
- North Point College of Arts and Technology
- North Valley College Foundation
- Notre Dame of Kidapawan College (NDKC)
- Read Data Access Computer College (RDACC)
- St. Louis Review Center (SLRC) - Kidapawan

=== Healthcare ===
- Cotabato Provincial Hospital
- Kidapawan Medical Specialist Center Inc.
- Kidapawan Doctors Hospital Inc.
- Madonna Medical Center Inc.

== Notable incidents ==
=== Martial Law era massacres ===
During the latter half of the 20th century, Kidapawan fell victim to massacres orchestrated by both pro-government and anti-government forces. Listed below are some of the most notable examples.

- Massacre in Palera - On 10 July 1971, seven members of the Galaw family were murdered by members of the Ilaga paramilitary group in Sitio Palera, Barangay Perez, including an elderly woman and two teenage boys. The farmer family was killed in a farm owned by their relative, Delia Dumacon Hassan.
- Massacres at Patadon - Hours before sunrise on 26 December 1976, Members from both the Philippine Constabulary and the Ilaga gunned down at least 12 Moro Civilians and injured dozen more in Barangay Patadon. The massacre happened almost simultaneously in the two separate Sitios of Patadon Centro and Pagagao.
- 1984 Massacre in New Bohol - On 8 September 1984, militants of the New People's Army ambushed a group of policemen and civilians as they patrol through Barangay New Bohol. Resolutions 62 to 72 of the 1984 Kidapawan Municipal Council was addressed to the families of eleven victims.

=== Recent History ===
The city is identified by the Armed Forces of the Philippines Western Mindanao Command as a conflict-affected area with the presence of CPP-NPA and BIFF. The list below are some of the most recent incidents that took place in the city.

- Road side blast - Around 2 p.m of 26 May 2017, an Improvised Explosive Device (IED) detonated along the national highway in Barangay Marbel, leaving three cops wounded. New Peoples’ Army (NPA) Guerilla Front 53 was behind the said attacks.
- The 2017 Kidapawan jail siege occurred when about a hundred unidentified armed men attacked the North Cotabato Provincial Jail in Kidapawan, Philippines at around midnight. At least 158 inmates were freed. Five inmates, a barangay official and a prison guard died in the siege. The jail break resulting from the attack is reportedly the biggest in the history of North Cotabato.
- 2016 Kidapawan protests - For three days from March 30, 2016, thousands of farmers and their supporters blockaded the Davao-Cotabato Highway in Kidapawan, North Cotabato. A day before prior to the road blockade, 500 farmers protest in front of the National Food Authority Office in Kidapawan to air their grievances. The demonstration ended violently after the police tried to disperse the action. The two sides had a confrontation, ultimately resulting to at least three deaths on the side of the protesters and 116 injured on both sides.
