= Makilala =

Municipality in Cotabato, Philippines

- Municipality
- Municipality of Makilala
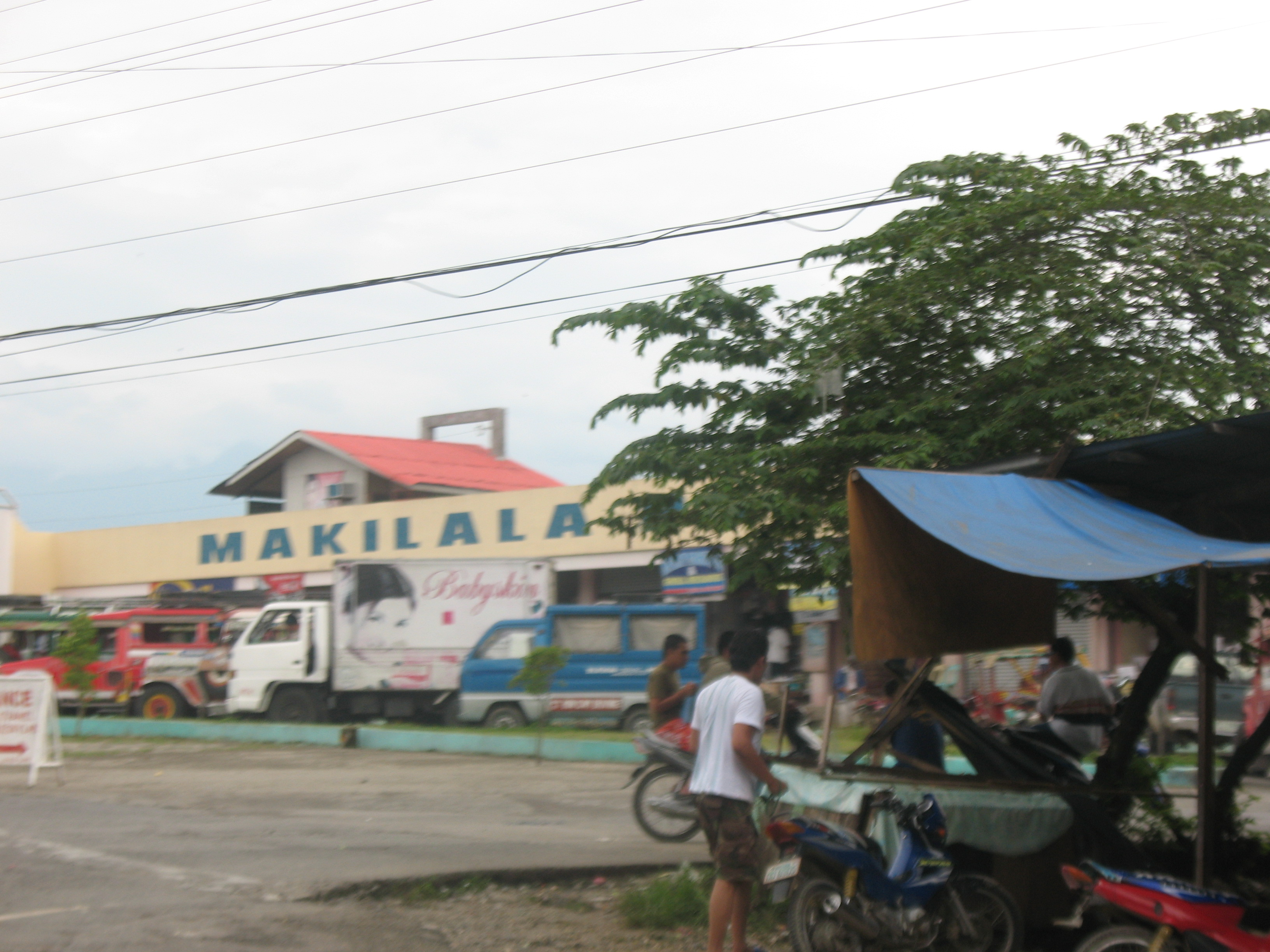
- Public market

- Seal

- Map of Cotabato with Makilala highlighted
- Interactive map of Makilala
- Location within the Philippines
- Coordinates: 6°57′37″N 125°05′21″E
- Country: Philippines
- Region: Soccsksargen
- Province: Cotabato
- District: 2nd district
- Founded: September 8, 1954
- Barangays: 38 (see Barangays)

Government
  - Type: Sangguniang Bayan
  - Mayor: Armando M. Quibod
  - Vice Mayor: Ryan D. Tabanay
  - Representative: Rudy S. Caoagdan
  - Electorate: 50,942 voters (2025)

Area
  - Total: 343.57 km^{2} (132.65 sq mi)
- Elevation: 268 m (879 ft)
- Highest elevation: 631 m (2,070 ft)
- Lowest elevation: 136 m (446 ft)

Population (2024 census)
  - Total: 88,522
  - Density: 257.65/km^{2} (667.32/sq mi)
  - Households: 21,318

Economy
  - Income class: 1st municipal income class
  - Poverty incidence: 21.38% (2023)
  - Revenue: ₱ 337.1 million (2024)
  - Assets: ₱ 1,861 million (2024)
  - Expenditure: ₱ 191.2 million (2024)
  - Liabilities: ₱ 652.1 million (2024)

Service provider
  - Electricity: Cotabato Electric Cooperative (COTELCO)
- Time zone: UTC+8 (PST)
- ZIP code: 9401
- PSGC: 1204707000
- IDD : area code: +63 (0)64
- Native languages: Hiligaynon; Cebuano; Tagabawa; Ilianen; Obo; Tagalog
- Website: makilala.gov.ph

Makilala, officially the Municipality of Makilala (Hiligaynon: Banwa sang Makilala; Cebuano: Lungsod sa Makilala; Tagalog: Bayan ng Makilala), is a municipality in the province of Cotabato, Philippines. According to the 2024 census, it has a population of 88,522 people.

== History ==
Makilala is one of the five daughter municipalities of Kidapawan. It was the second to separate, created through Executive Order No. 63, issued by President Ramon Magsaysay on September 8, 1954. Incumbent Kidapawan councilor Ireneo Castro was appointed as its first mayor. Following the separation, Kidapawan lost its southern border with the then-undivided Davao. The village of Indangan split in two as a result. A few years later, the councilors petitioned to change the border, situated at Saguing River, to the Malaang River, but they were ignored by the national government.

The municipality was a village with a name of "Lamitan".

The name Makilala is a portmanteau of the names of the early barangays of the area, namely: Malasila, Kisante, and Lamitan. An additional "la" was added to match the Hiligaynon word which means "to be known".

On December 29, 1985, members of the Pacot family were gunned down by armed men, allegedly from the Integrated Civil Home Defense Force, leaving two dead and six wounded.

== Geography ==
The municipality of Makilala is located on the south-east portion of Cotabato Province and the last town going to Davao City. It is bounded by the City of Kidapawan in the north, Municipality of M’lang in the west, Province of Davao Del Sur in the south and the Municipality of Tulunan in the south-east.

It is 129 kilometres (80 mi) from Cotabato City, 100 kilometres (62 mi) from Davao City, and 114 kilometres (71 mi) from General Santos.

=== Barangays ===
Makilala is politically subdivided into 38 barangays. Each barangay consists of puroks while some have sitios.

- Batasan
- Bato
- Biangan
- Buena Vida
- Buhay
- Bulakanon
- Cabilao
- Concepcion
- Dagupan
- Garsika
- Guangan
- Indangan
- Jose Rizal
- Katipunan II
- Kawayanon
- Kisante
- Leboce
- Libertad
- Luayon
- Luna Norte
- Luna Sur
- Malabuan
- Malasila
- Malungon
- New Baguio
- New Bulatukan
- New Cebu
- New Israel
- Old Bulatukan
- Poblacion
- Rodero
- Saguing
- San Vicente
- Santa Felomina
- Santo Niño
- Sinkatulan
- Taluntalunan
- Villaflores

=== Climate ===
Climate data for Makilala, Cotabato
Month	Jan	Feb	Mar	Apr	May	Jun	Jul	Aug	Sep	Oct	Nov	Dec	Year
Mean daily maximum °C (°F)	29 (84)	29 (84)	30 (86)	31 (88)	29 (84)	28 (82)	28 (82)	28 (82)	29 (84)	29 (84)	29 (84)	29 (84)	29 (84)
Mean daily minimum °C (°F)	20 (68)	20 (68)	20 (68)	21 (70)	22 (72)	22 (72)	22 (72)	22 (72)	22 (72)	22 (72)	21 (70)	21 (70)	21 (71)
Average precipitation mm (inches)	51 (2.0)	41 (1.6)	38 (1.5)	45 (1.8)	82 (3.2)	108 (4.3)	114 (4.5)	120 (4.7)	95 (3.7)	96 (3.8)	76 (3.0)	52 (2.0)	918 (36.1)
Average rainy days	13.2	12.0	13.8	15.3	22.5	23.9	25.2	25.4	23.3	24.1	21.0	16.8	236.5
Source: Meteoblue

Makilala's climatic condition is characterized by rainfall evenly distributed throughout the year, thus, the springs kept flowing, rivers are alive and farms are productive. The slopes of Mt. Apo, Mt. Libadan, Mt. Gap and Mt. Naponggis serve as rain generators that provide reliable rainfall pattern and cool climate.

== Demographics ==
Population census of Makilala
Year	Pop.	±% p.a.
1960	26,176	—
1970	35,796	+3.18%
1975	37,259	+0.81%
1980	41,497	+2.18%
1990	55,060	+2.87%
1995	61,125	+1.98%
2000	63,039	+0.66%
2007	71,543	+1.76%
2010	77,508	+2.96%
2015	83,851	+1.51%
2020	87,927	+1.00%
2024	88,522	+0.16%
Source: Philippine Statistics Authority

In the 2024 census, the population of Makilala was 88,522 people, with a density of 260 inhabitants per square kilometre or 670 inhabitants per square mile.

== Economy ==
Poverty incidence of Makilala (%)

Source: Philippine Statistics Authority

Industries in Makilala are the rubber Industry, woodworks and agri-industrial products.

Major firms are STANFILCO-DOLE, engaged in cavendish production and rubber processing companies like STANDECO, FARMA, MRDI, PIONEER, LASRI, MRI, and DAVCO. Major wood processing company is RNF Summit. Makilala has a radio station called First Community Radio.

Agricultural land is mostly planted with rubber, rice, coconut, coffee, banana, vegetables and fruits such as durian, marang, rambutan and mangosteen.

== Tourism ==
- The foothills of Mount Apo, especially the area of Mt. Apo National Park which falls within Barangay Batasan, also contain several waterfalls, most of them hidden away in the old-growth forest within the National Park, while two of the tallest falls, Matibago and Padalagi, are visible from the National Highway. As of now there are no tourist-friendly access to these waterfalls, with them being several hours of hard trekking from the Barangays.
- The Barangay of New Israel is situated on the periphery of Mount Apo National Park at an elevation of 1,600 feet above sea level. New Israel was established by the Moncadistas, a religious sect. Aside from being a starting point for hikes up Mt. Apo, it is also home to a troop of monkeys, which are used to interact with humans, and New Israel Eco Park, with Asia's longest zip-line.
- Sang'ngawan Falls is found in the neighboring Barangay of Batasan. It is a collection of cold & hot natural pools, found beside the Malasila river. Its hot sulfuric pools are reputed to have healing effects.
- Le Reve Resort is located along National Highway, Makilala, Cotabato. It is an inland resort known for its use of unchlorinated spring water piped from the foothills of Mt. Apo
- Don Bosco Youth Camp, also located in Batasan, is a favorite venue for events like seminars, conferences, & weddings.
- Camps Cajelo and Aurora are found along the National Highway in Barangay Bulatukan. It is known as the venue for yearly Scouting events in the province.
- The access roads to the many barangays of Makilala also make for good mountain biking, with varying degrees of difficulty.
