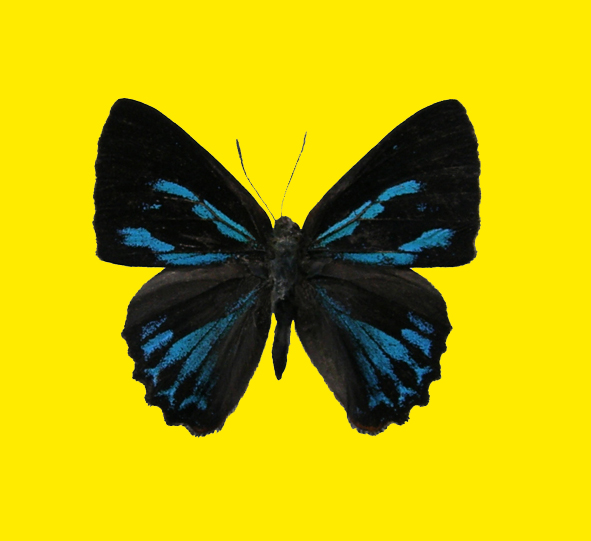
- Male upperside
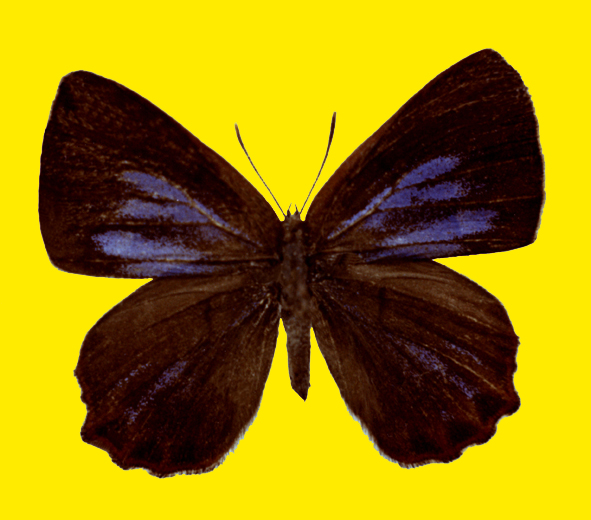
- Female upperside

Scientific classification
- Kingdom: Animalia
- Phylum: Arthropoda
- Clade: Pancrustacea
- Class: Insecta
- Order: Lepidoptera
- Family: Lycaenidae
- Genus: Deramas
- Species: D. treadawayi

Binomial name
- Deramas treadawayi H. Hayashi, 1981

= Deramas treadawayi =

Species of butterfly

Deramas treadawayi is a butterfly of the family Lycaenidae first described by Hisakazu Hayashi in 1981. It is found in the region of Mindanao, Philippines.

== Etymology ==
The specific name is dedicated to and named after Mr. Colin G. Treadaway; a lepidopterist on the Philippine butterfly.

== Gallery ==
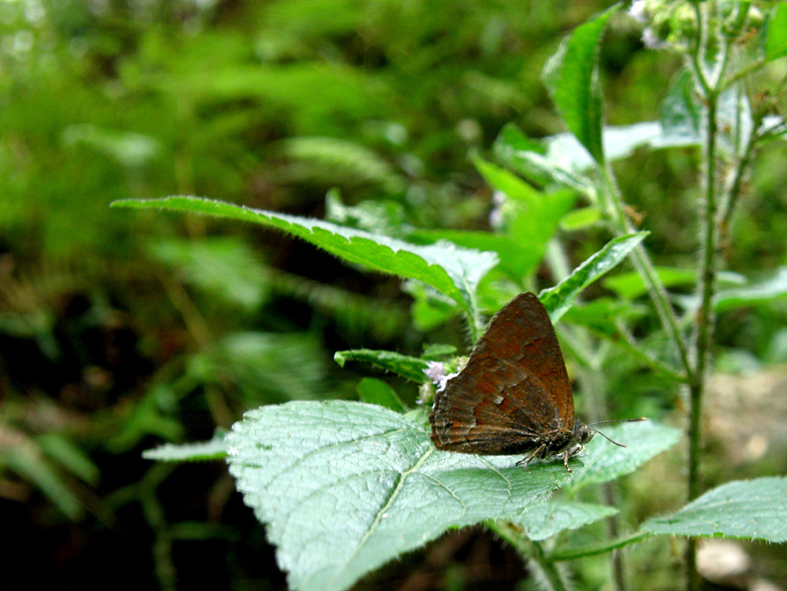
Male specimen, Mount Apo, Mindanao

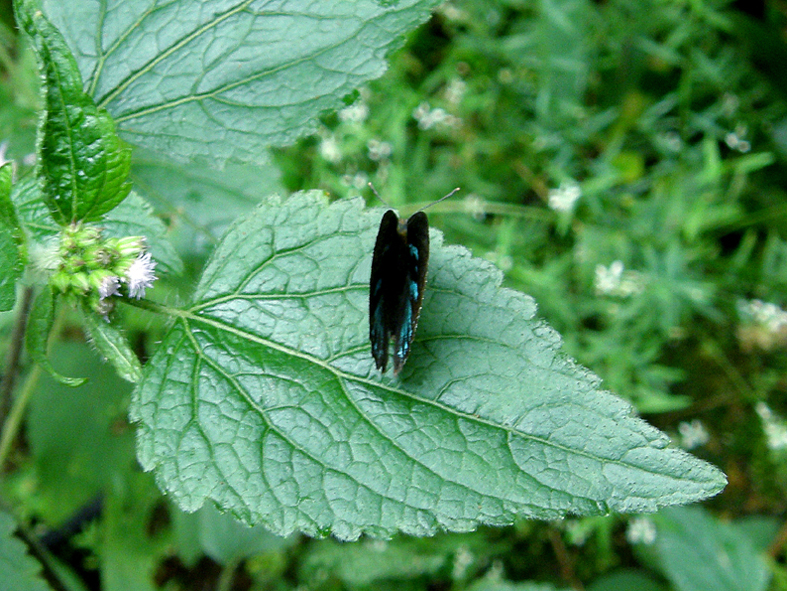
Male specimen, Mount Apo
