= Marbel River =

River in Cotabato, Philippines

Marbel River: Marble River; Marbol River; Sulphur River
- Location within Mindanao mainland Location within Philippines

Location
- Country: Philippines
- Region: Soccsksargen
- Province: Cotabato

Physical characteristics
- Source: foot of Mount Apo
- Mouth: Kabacan River
  - coordinates: 7°07′13″N 124°53′06″E

Basin features
- Progression: Marbel–Kabacan–Pulangi–Mindanao

The Marbel River, also known as the Marbol River and the Sulphur River, is a river in the province of Cotabato in the Philippines. It is located at the foot of Mount Apo and drains its northwest flank. The Marble River connects to the Kabacan River in Cotabato, a tributary of the Pulangi River which empties into the Rio Grande de Mindanao in Cotabato City.
