= Colegio de Kidapawan =

Private college in Cotabato, Philippines

Colegio Kidapawan
- Type: Private
- Established: 1986
- President: Janice Marie Mearns-Martinez
- Location: Kidapawan City, Cotabato, Philippines; 7°00′03″N 125°05′09″E
- Website: www.cdk.edu.ph
- Location in Mindanao Location in the Philippines

The Colegio de Kidapawan (CdK), formerly North Cotabato Institute of Technology (NORCIT), is a private and a non-sectarian tertiary school located at Quezon Boulevard, Kidapawan City, Cotabato, Philippines. It is the first college in Kidapawan City to have dramatically metamorphosed into a competitive and standardized techno-educational institution. Its concern and ability to respond to the immediate needs of the province and of its neighboring communities inspired its founders to push through with its creation.

== Brief history ==
The college was established in 1986 with only handful of instructors, personnel and students. A building along Datu Ingkal Street was rented for its initial operations. A Board of Trustees composed of six individuals was organized. After six years, the college bought, and moved to, its current site along Quezon Boulevard on the eastern part of Kidapawan.

The initial technical courses offered were General Radio Communication Operator, General Midwifery, Associate in Hotel and Restaurant Management, Industrial Electricity, Radio Television Technician, Automotive and Diesel Mechanics.

Later on, the school started four-year degree programs in BS in Nursing, BS in Civil Engineering, BS in Computer Engineering, BS in Computer Science, BS in Hotel and Restaurant Management, BS in Secondary Education, Bachelor in Elementary Education, Bachelor of Arts, Major in Mass Communication, BS in Criminology, and BS in Business Administration.

Today, with its new administration, CdK has academic recognition, mainly in technology education. All degree courses are duly recognized by the Commission on Higher Education (CHED).
