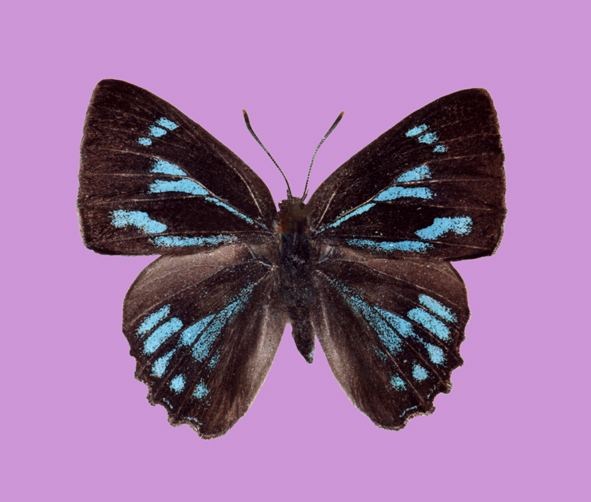
- Male upperside
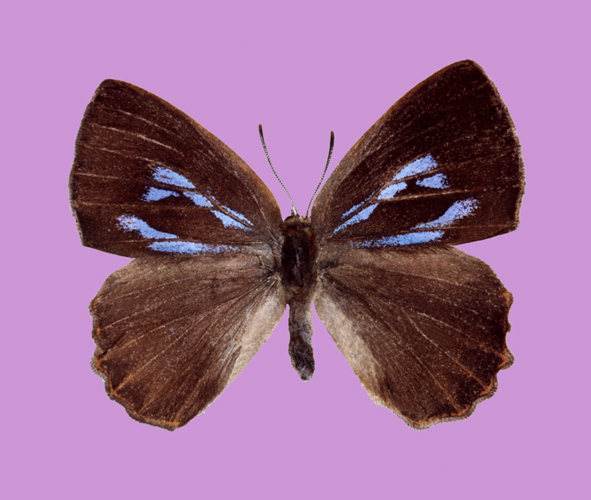
- Female upperside

Scientific classification
- Domain: Eukaryota
- Kingdom: Animalia
- Phylum: Arthropoda
- Class: Insecta
- Order: Lepidoptera
- Family: Lycaenidae
- Genus: Deramas
- Species: D. toshikoae

Binomial name
- Deramas toshikoae H. Hayashi, 1981

= Deramas toshikoae =

Species of butterfly

Deramas toshikoae is a butterfly of the family Lycaenidae. Its forewing length is 15–16 mm. It is endemic to the Philippines. It is rare species and found on Mindanao, Leyte and Mindoro islands. Etymology. The specific name is dedicated to the mother of the author.
