= Bantac River =

River in Cotabato, Philippines

- Bantac River mouth Bantac River (Philippines)

Location
- Country: Philippines
- Region: Soccsksargen
- Province: Cotabato
- City/municipality: Magpet

Physical characteristics
- Mouth: Pulangi River
  - coordinates: 7°08′23″N 124°59′52″E

Basin features
- Progression: Bantac–Pulangi—Mindanao

The Bantac River is a river in the municipality of Magpet in Cotabato province of the Philippines. It is a tributary of the Kabacan River in Kabacan that connects with the Pulangi River in the municipality of Carmen, which empties into the Rio Grande de Mindanao.

In October 2024, the river overflowed its bank causing flash floods and damage to Cotabato.
