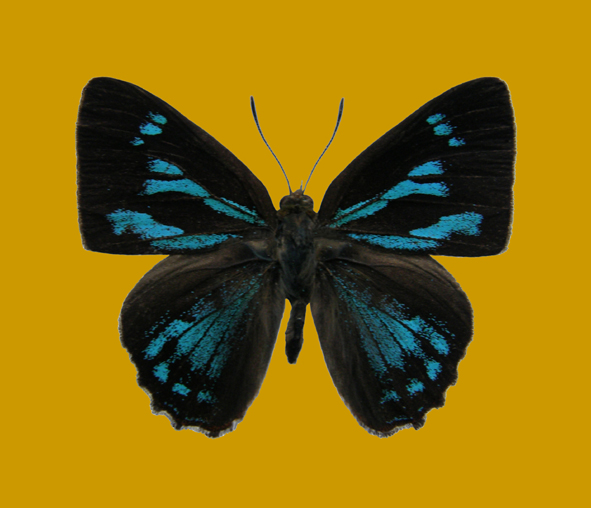
- D. tomokoae, male upperside
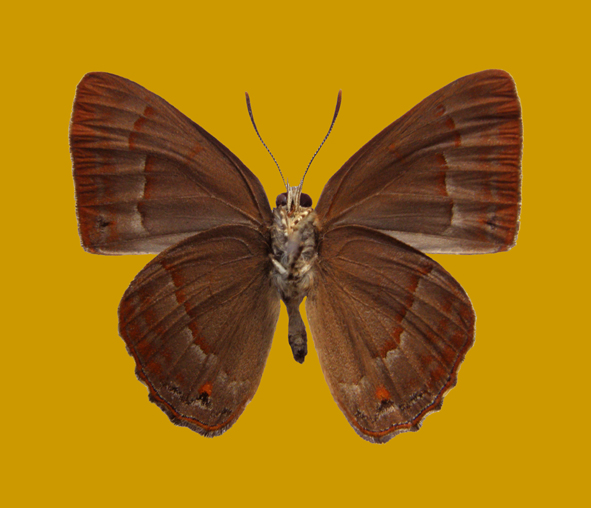
- D. tomokoae, male underside

Scientific classification
- Kingdom: Animalia
- Phylum: Arthropoda
- Clade: Pancrustacea
- Class: Insecta
- Order: Lepidoptera
- Family: Lycaenidae
- Tribe: Poritiini
- Genus: Deramas; Distant, 1886

Synonyms
- Zarona de Nicéville, [1889]

= Deramas =

Butterfly genus in family Lycaenidae

Deramas is a genus of butterflies in the family Lycaenidae erected by William Lucas Distant in 1886. The genus ranges from south Myanmar to Sundaland, the Philippines and Sulawesi. Most of the species are rare and endangered, and are confined to forest from sea level to about 5,000 feet (1,500 m).

== Species ==
- Deramas alixae Eliot, 1978 Malaya
- Deramas antynax Eliot, 1970 Malaya
- Deramas anyx Eliot, 1964 Malaya
- Deramas arshadorum Eliot, 1986 Malaya
- Deramas basrii Eliot, 1992 Malaya
- Deramas bidotata (Fruhstorfer, 1914) Philippines
- Deramas cham Saito & Seki, 2006 Vietnam
- Deramas evelynae Schröder & Treadaway, 1978 Philippines
- Deramas ikedai H. Hayashi, 1978
- Deramas jasoda (de Nicéville, [1889])
- Deramas livens Distant, 1886
- Deramas manobo Schröder & Treadaway, 1978 Philippines
- Deramas masae Kawai, 1994 Sulawesi
- Deramas mindanensis Eliot, 1964 Philippines
- Deramas montana Schröder & Treadaway, 1978 Philippines
- Deramas nanae Osada, 1994 Sulawesi
- Deramas nelvis Eliot, 1964
- Deramas nigrescens Eliot, 1964 Sulawesi
- Deramas nolens Eliot, 1964 Burma
- Deramas osamui Hayashi & Ohtsuka, 1985 Borneo
- Deramas sumikat Schröder & Treadaway, 1986 Philippines
- Deramas suwartinae Osada, 1987 Sulawesi
- Deramas talophi H. Hayashi, Schröder & Treadaway, 1984 Philippines
- Deramas tomokoae H. Hayashi, 1978
- Deramas toshikoae H. Hayashi, 1981
- Deramas treadawayi H. Hayashi, 1981
- Deramas woolletti Eliot, 1970 Malaya
