= Tudaya Falls =

Waterfall in Davao del Sur, Philippines

Tudaya Falls is a waterfall on the Davao del Sur stream. It is located in Mount Apo Natural Park, Bansalan, Davao del Sur, Mindanao in the Philippines. At 100 metres, it is the tallest waterfall in Mt. Apo Natural Park. This waterfall flows into the Sibulan River, which flows to Davao Gulf.

== See also ==
- List of waterfalls
