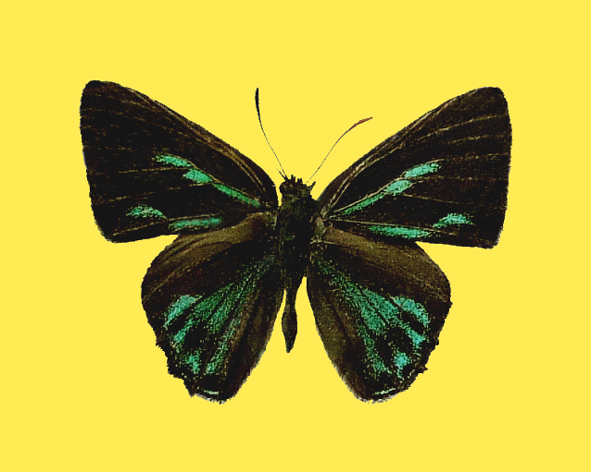
- Male
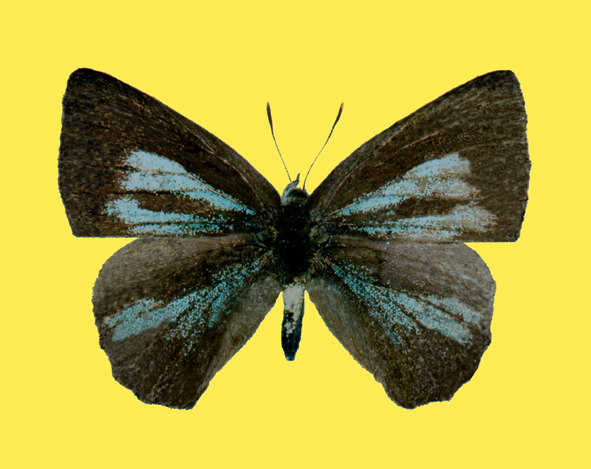
- Female

Scientific classification
- Domain: Eukaryota
- Kingdom: Animalia
- Phylum: Arthropoda
- Class: Insecta
- Order: Lepidoptera
- Family: Lycaenidae
- Genus: Deramas
- Species: D. ikedai

Binomial name
- Deramas ikedai H. Hayashi, 1978

= Deramas ikedai =

Species of butterfly

Deramas ikedai is a butterfly of the family Lycaenidae, found on Mindanao in the Philippines. The species was first described by Hisakazu Hayashi in 1978.
