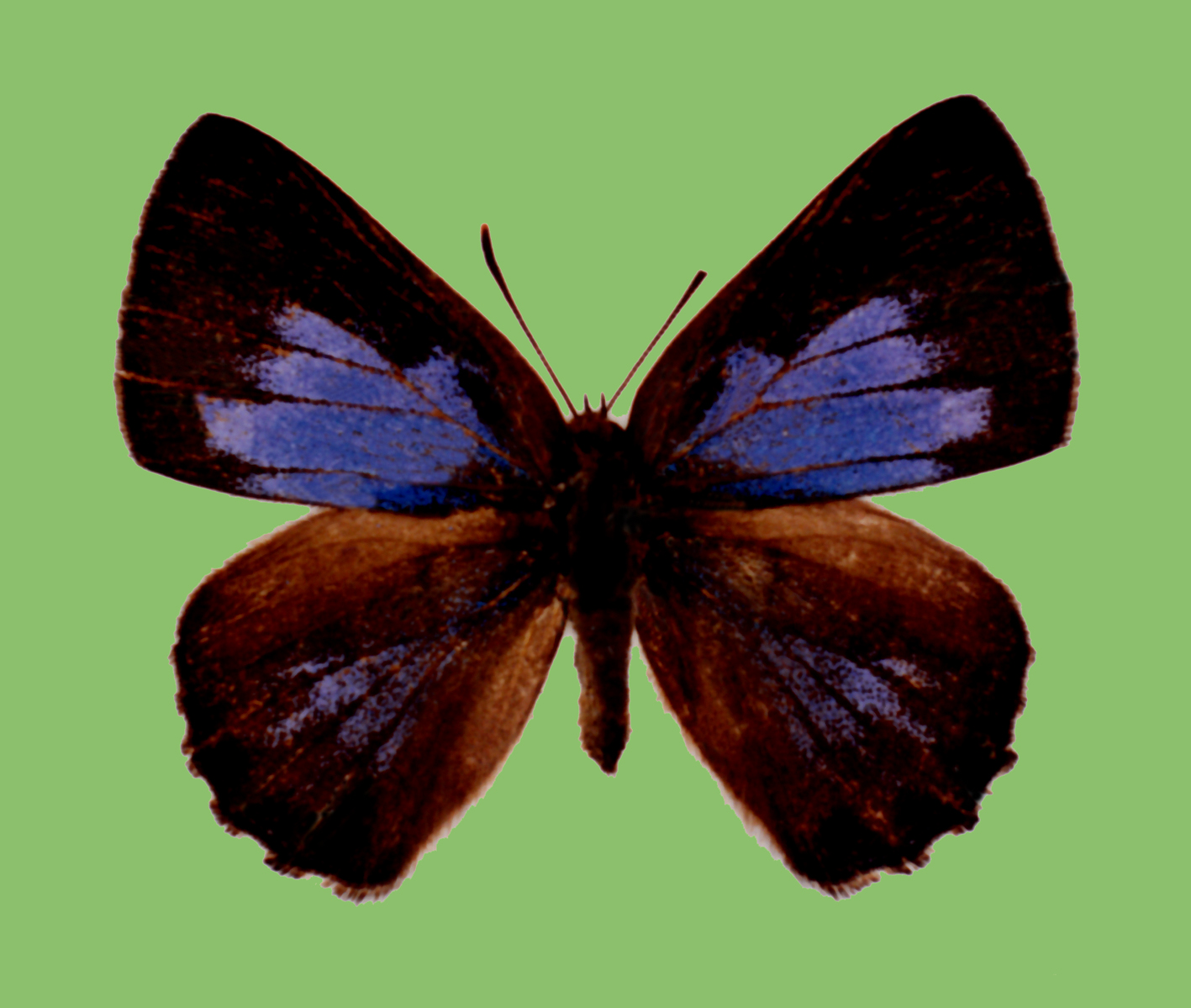

Scientific classification
- Domain: Eukaryota
- Kingdom: Animalia
- Phylum: Arthropoda
- Class: Insecta
- Order: Lepidoptera
- Family: Lycaenidae
- Genus: Deramas
- Species: D. nelvis

Binomial name
- Deramas nelvis Eliot, 1964

= Deramas nelvis =

Species of butterfly

Deramas nelvis is a butterfly in the family Lycaenidae. It was described by John Nevill Eliot in 1964. It is found in the Indomalayan realm.

== Subspecies ==
- Deramas nelvis nelvis (Peninsular Malaysia, Sumatra)
- Deramas nelvis sumatrensis Eliot, 1964 (Sumatra)
