= Kidapawan Medical Specialist Center =

Private hospital in Cotabato, Philippines

Kidapawan Medical Specialist Center, Inc.
- Medical Specialist Group
- Location within Mindanao Location within Philippines

Geography
- Location: Sudapin, Kidapawan City, Cotabato 9400, Philippines
- Coordinates: 7°01′18″N 125°05′38″E

Organization
- Care system: Private
- Type: General

Services
- Emergency department: Yes
- Beds: 200

History
- Founded: April 1, 1987; 39 years ago

Links
- Website: www.kmsci.com.ph

The Kidapawan Medical Specialist Center, Inc. (abbreviated as KMSCI) is a tertiary referral hospital in Kidapawan City, Philippines. The hospital is owned and managed by the Medical Specialist Group.

== History ==
The Balong Medical Specialist Center started in a renovating lodging house in Plaridel Street, Kidapawan City, on April 1, 1987. The medical center only occupied little land and only had six doctors-of which are 2 surgeons, an anesthesiologist, a pediatrician, an OB-gynecologist and an internist.

In less than two years the Kidapawan Medical Group acquired a one-hectare lot in Barangay Sudapin, Kidapawan City. Construction of the hospital building started in 1990 covering an area of around 1200 square meters. the new building had a capacity of 100 beds and by that time the hospital is already operating as a Secondary General Hospital.

The Medical Specialist Group occupied the new building on September 28, 1991. Due to increasing demand the group expanded its services to include ophthalmology, ultrasonography, improved services in laboratory and pathology and added more private rooms by completing the third floor of the building.

The Kidapawan Medical Group the formally became a corporation upon registration with the Securities and Exchange Commission in 1989. As a corporation, the hospital now functions through the board of directors. The president serves as the chief executive officer of the organization and in his capacity presides at all board meetings, oversees the business of the corporation, and serves as an official liaison to all regulatory bodies.
