= 2017 Kidapawan jail siege =

2017 prison break in the Philippines

- Kidapawan (Philippines)
- Location: Barangay Amas, Kidapawan, Philippines
- Date: January 4, 2017 around 1:00 (UTC+8)
- Target: Cotabato Provincial Jail
- Attack type: Prison break
- Deaths: 7 (1 guard, 1 barangay official, 5 prisoners)
- Perpetrators: Moro Islamic Liberation Front (accused; denied) Bangsamoro Islamic Freedom Fighters (accused; denied)
- No. of participants: 100 armed men (attackers)
- Defender: Philippine National Police

The 2017 Kidapawan jail siege occurred when about a hundred unidentified armed men attacked the Cotabato Provincial Jail in Kidapawan, Philippines at around midnight freeing at least 158 inmates. Five inmates, a barangay official and a prison guard died in the siege. The jail break resulting from the attack is reportedly the biggest in the history of Cotabato.

== Attack ==
At around 1:00 am armed men attacked the Cotabato Provincial Jail in Barangay Amas of Kidapawan. This led to the escape of at least 158 inmates out of the 1,511 people detained in the prison. A power outage which put out the lights in the prison preceded the attack. The intent of the siege was to free certain inmates detained in two cells but nearby inmates were also freed by the gunmen who reportedly spoke in the Maguindanao language.

According to a report by the Bureau of Jail Management and Penology (BJMP), the gunfight following the attack lasted around two hours. The prisoners reportedly escaped through a wooden ladder placed at the back portion of the prison.

Earlier before the attack, the local police of Amas was warned of plans of a jail siege to free high-profile inmates. The barangay volunteer security group which was not armed warned the residents of the locality of the possible attack.

Jail Officer 1 Excel Visido died during the attack as well as Barangay Patadon Councilor, Satar Manalundong who was shot after authorities suspected him of helping an inmate escape.

12 escapees were "recovered" by authorities while two surrendered to the city mayor.

== Aftermath ==
Kidapawan Mayor Joseph Evangelista requested the 39th Infantry Battalion to help the Cotabato Police Provincial Office in securing the site of the incident and in conducting strict highway inspection. The Kidapawan City 911 Response Unit was also put on standby in the area. Classes were suspended in five public schools situated in Barangay Amas. BJMP's Special Tactics and Response team, the Special Action Force, and the military conducted clearing operations within and around the vicinity of the prison.

The police in Davao City were put into full alert following the jail siege.

== Perpetrators ==
Initial reports suggested that the Moro Islamic Liberation Front (MILF) were behind the attack with the armed group responsible for the attack allegedly led by MILF commander Satar Mandalondong. MILF Vice Chairman for Political Affairs Ghadzali Jaafar denied that his group was involved in the attack and offered to share information regarding the attack if they manage to get them.

The Bangsamoro Islamic Freedom Fighters were also suspected to be behind the attack, but the group's spokesperson Abu Misry denied the involvement of his group in the attack.

The local authorities of Amas has received feedback that the group was led by a certain Commander Derby, who is wanted for serious offenses, including armed robbery, drug trafficking, and extortion. Commander Derby was suspected to be bribed by a local drug lord to help him escape.
