= Digos River =

River in Davao del Sur, Philippines

- Digos River mouth Digos River (Philippines)

Location
- Country: Philippines
- Region: Davao Region
- Province: Davao del Sur
- City/municipality: Digos

Physical characteristics
- Mouth: Davao Gulf
  - coordinates: 6°44′25″N 125°23′07″E

The Digos River is in Digos in Davao del Sur province of the Philippines, flowing into Davao Gulf.
