= Kabacan River =

River in Cotabato, Philippines

- Location within Mindanao mainland Location within Philippines

Location
- Country: Philippines
- Region: Soccsksargen
- Province: Cotabato

Physical characteristics
- Source: Mount Apo
  - location: Cotabato
  - elevation: 1,552 m (5,092 ft)
- Mouth: Pulangi River
  - location: Kayaga, Kabacan, Cotabato
  - coordinates: 7°08′34″N 124°48′14″E
- Length: 80 km (50 mi)

Basin features
- Progression: Kabacan–Pulangi–Mindanao
- Tributaries
  - left: Bantac River
  - right: Marbel River; Matingao River

The Kabacan River is a river in the province of Cotabato in the Philippines. It is a tributary of the Pulangi River, discharging at Kayaga, Kabacan, Cotabato.

== Flooding ==
Flooding occurs during heavy rainfall, thunderstorms and typhoon season.

On October 17, 2024, a flood control project was shifted from the Department of Public Works and Highways to the Philippine Carabao Center.

== Dam ==
- Kabacan RIS, National Irrigation Administration (NIA)
