= Lake Venado =

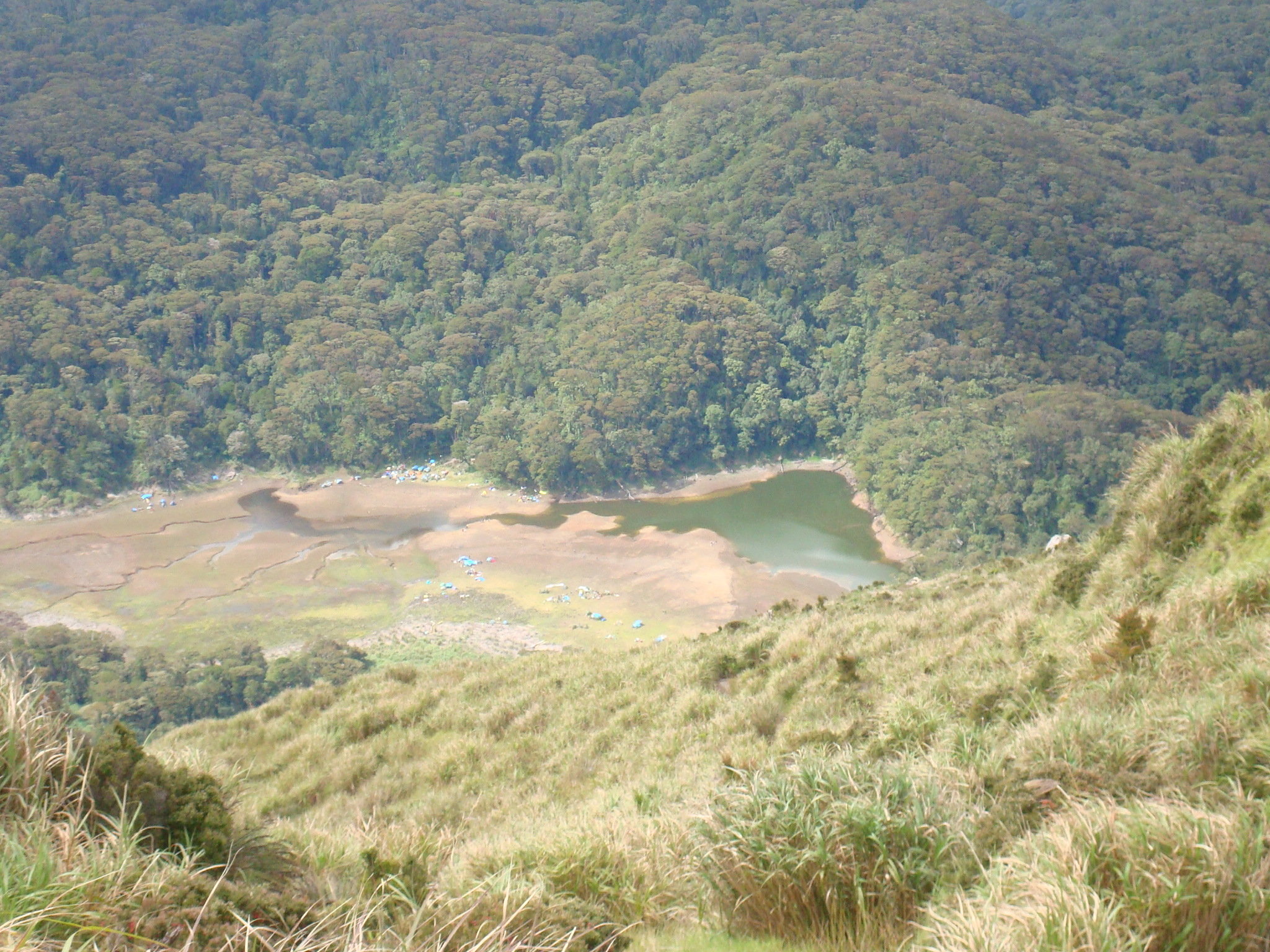
- The lake as seen from Mount Apo

- Location within the Philippines
- Location: Mindanao
- Coordinates: 7°00′14″N 125°16′6″E
- Type: Endorheic lake
- Max. depth: 20 ft (6.10 m)
- Surface elevation: 2,194.56 m (7,200.00 ft)

Lake Venado is an endorheic lake located at the foot of Mount Apo in the province of Cotabato, Mindanao, Philippines. It is the second highest lake in the country after Bulalacao Lake of Mount Tabayoc in Benguet, found in coordinates 7°00′8″N 125°16′10″E, with an estimated surface elevation of 7,200 feet (2,195 m) above sea level. The lake is fed by local run-off and there is no outflow from the lake. The lake usually loses two-thirds of its size during dry months due to evaporation.

The name of the lake comes from the Spanish word venado, "deer," owing to the deer-like shape of the lake. However, the people living in the area called the lake Linaw, a Cebuano word for "clear", because its crystal-clear waters reflect the peak of Mount Apo. Local tribes believe the lake to be enchanted, inhabited by spirits.

The vicinity of the lake is a popular camping site for mountaineers en route to and coming down from the peak of Mount Apo, the Philippines' highest mountain. In 2007, a Filipino mountaineer descending from the summit drowned in the lake.
