= Mount Apo =

Highest mountain in the Philippines

- Apo Sandawa (Manobo languages); Bundok Apo (Tagalog); Bukid Apo (Cebuano)
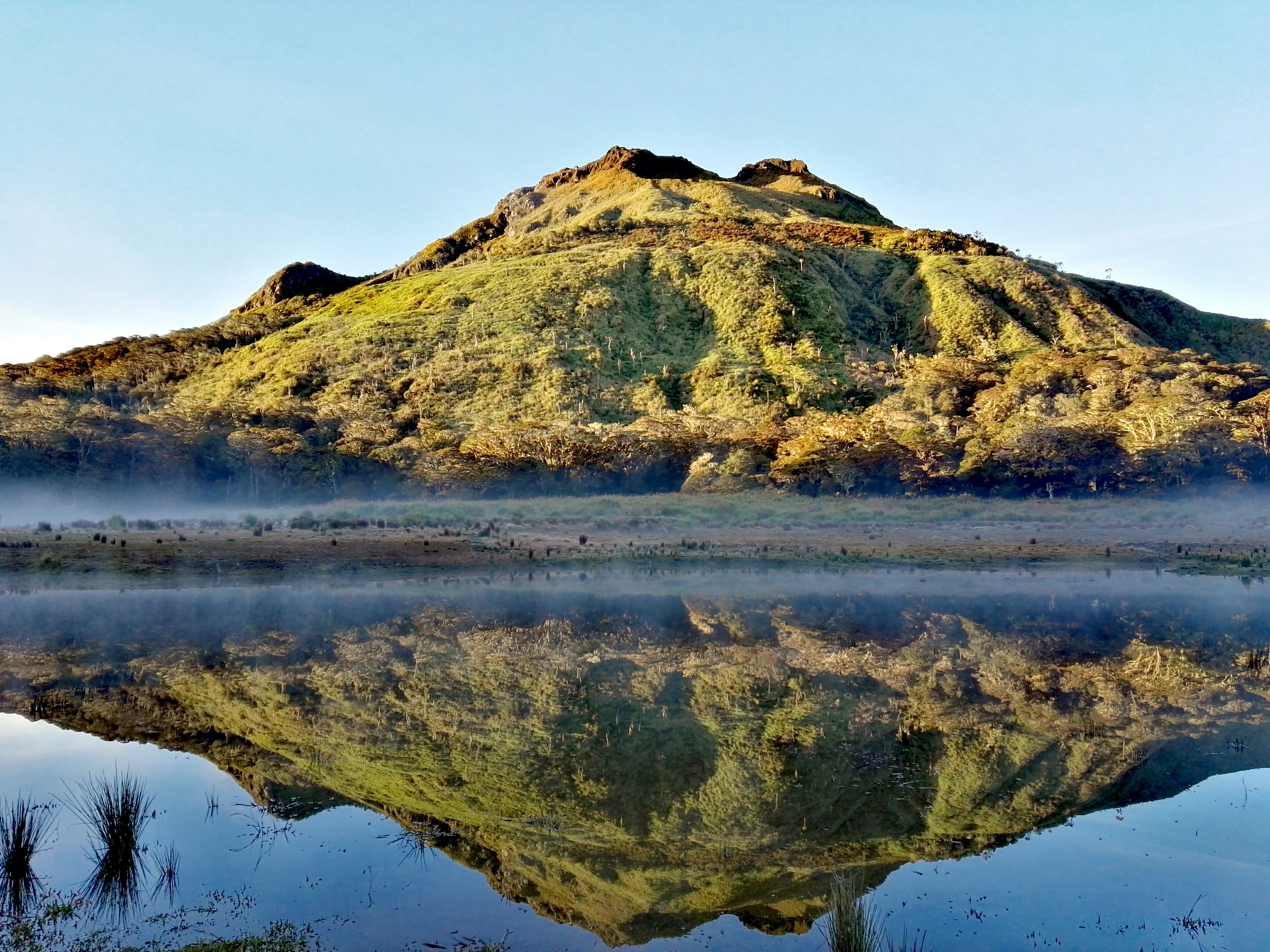
- Mount Apo with Lake Venado at its foot

Highest point
- Elevation: 2,954 m (9,692 ft)
- Prominence: 2,954 m (9,692 ft); Ranked 99th
- Isolation: 905 km (562 mi) to Fuyul Sojol
- Listing: Island highest point 24th; Country high points 72nd; Philippines highest peaks 1st; Philippines Ultra peaks 1st; Philippines Ribu peaks 1st; Mindanao highest peak; Potentially active volcano
- Coordinates: 6°59′15″N 125°16′15″E

Geography
- Location within Mindanao mainland Location within Philippines
- Country: Philippines
- Region: Davao Region; Soccsksargen
- Province: Cotabato; Davao del Sur
- City/municipality: Davao City; Digos; Kidapawan; Sta. Cruz
- Parent range: Apo–Talomo

Geology
- Rock age: Pliocene-Quaternary
- Mountain type: Stratovolcano
- Volcanic arc: Central Mindanao Volcanic Arc
- Last eruption: Unknown

Climbing
- First ascent: 1880 by Joaquin Rajal, governor of Davao; Joseph Montano, a French anthropologist; Jesuit missionary Father Mateo Gisbert, etc.
- Easiest route: Kidapawan-Magpet Trail

Mount Apo is the highest mountain peak in the Philippines, with an elevation of 2,954 meters (9,692 ft) above sea level. A large solfataric, dormant stratovolcano, it is part of the Apo-Talomo Mountain Range of Mindanao island. Apo is situated on the tripartite border of Davao City, Davao del Sur, and Cotabato; its peak is visible from Davao City 45 kilometers (28 mi) to the northeast, Digos 25 kilometers (16 mi) to the southeast, and Bansalan 20 kilometers (12 mi) to the west. Apo is a protected area and is the centerpiece of Mount Apo Natural Park.

== Geology ==
Mount Apo is a flat-topped, 2,954 m (9,692 ft) (above sea level) high stratovolcano with three peaks. It is the highest peak of the Philippines. The southwest peak has the highest elevation and is topped by a 200 m (656 ft) wide crater that contains a small lake.

The volcanic history of Mount Apo is poorly known but eruptions have produced andesitic-to-dacitic lava. A line of solfataras extend from the southeast flank at an elevation of 2,400 m (7,874 ft) to the summit. Mount Apo is not known to have had historical eruptions, and was incorrectly attributed to be the source volcano of the 1641 eruption of Mount Melibengoy, also in Mindanao.

== Etymology and indigenous peoples ==
Apo is a title of respect meaning "revered elder" in various languages of the surrounding Lumad indigenous peoples. It is the shortened form of the original Manobo and Kalagan name Apo Sandawa ("Elder Sandawa" or "Grandfather Sandawa"), the name of the spirit of the mountain. Apo Sandawa is also regarded as an ancestor spirit by the various Manobo and Kalagan tribes living in the foothills, including the Obo, Manobo Bagobo, Manobo Apao, Tagabawa, Matigsalug, Ata, Arumanen, Tinananen, Kulamanen, Tagakaulo and Kagan peoples. The mountain itself is considered sacred grounds. Various rituals to Apo Sandawa are conducted by the supreme walyan (shaman) known as the diwata, who also serves as the medium for Apo Sandawa and the ancestor spirits of the Manobo and Kalagan tribes.

== Climate ==
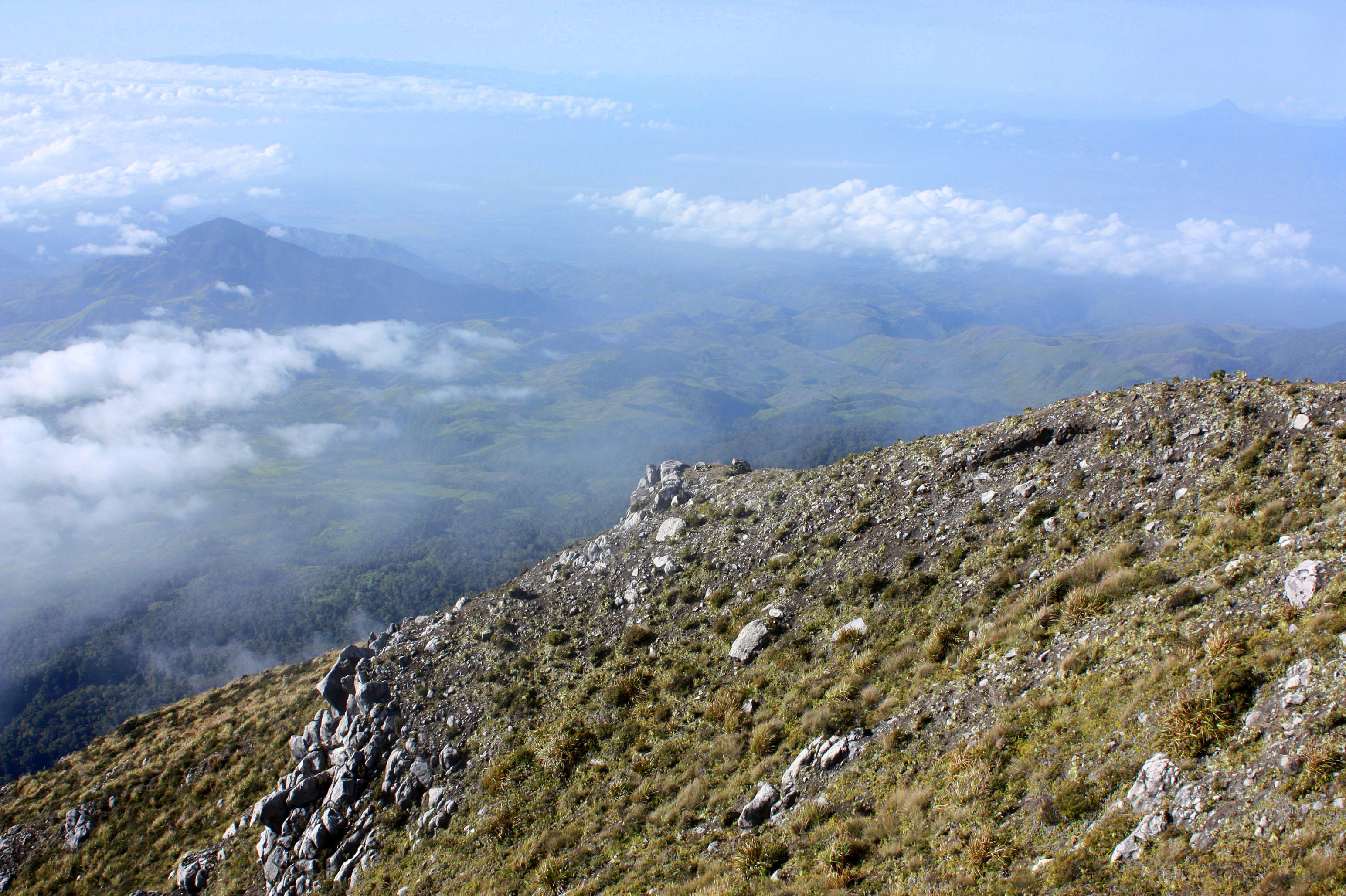
Overlooking view from Mount Apo summit

The climate at the summit of Mount Apo is alpine (Köppen ETH) as its mean temperature does not exceed 10 °C or 50 °F in any month. It falls under the Type IV climate under the modified corona's classification wherein rainfall is uniformly distributed throughout the year. Mean monthly temperature ranges from a low 6.9 °C (44.4 °F) during January to 8.9 °C (48.0 °F) during April. Monthly relative humidity ranges from 78% during March and April and 82% during June and July. Minima reach 2.4 °C (36.3 °F) in January and February.

In late March–April 2016, due to the extreme effects of El Niño caused by climate change, massive patches of forest fires and bushfires appeared on the slopes of the mountain, causing hikers on the mountain to halt their ascent. Tourism in the region was threatened due to a massive haze engulfing the slopes of the mountain. The mountain later recovered after the government and local stakeholders initiated a holistic recovery plan for the entire natural park.

Climate data for Mount Apo
Month	Jan	Feb	Mar	Apr	May	Jun	Jul	Aug	Sep	Oct	Nov	Dec	Year
Mean daily maximum °C (°F)	11.4 (52.5)	12.4 (54.3)	12.4 (54.3)	13.4 (56.1)	12.4 (54.3)	11.4 (52.5)	10.4 (50.7)	10.4 (50.7)	11.4 (52.5)	11.4 (52.5)	11.4 (52.5)	11.4 (52.5)	11.7 (53.0)
Daily mean °C (°F)	6.9 (44.4)	7.4 (45.3)	7.9 (46.2)	8.9 (48.0)	8.4 (47.1)	7.9 (46.2)	7.4 (45.3)	7.4 (45.3)	7.9 (46.2)	7.9 (46.2)	7.9 (46.2)	7.4 (45.3)	7.8 (46.0)
Mean daily minimum °C (°F)	2.4 (36.3)	2.4 (36.3)	3.4 (38.1)	4.4 (39.9)	4.4 (39.9)	4.4 (39.9)	4.4 (39.9)	4.4 (39.9)	4.4 (39.9)	4.4 (39.9)	4.4 (39.9)	3.4 (38.1)	3.9 (39.0)
Average precipitation mm (inches)	51 (2.0)	41 (1.6)	38 (1.5)	45 (1.8)	82 (3.2)	108 (4.3)	114 (4.5)	120 (4.7)	95 (3.7)	96 (3.8)	76 (3.0)	52 (2.0)	918 (36.1)
Source: meteoblue.com (modeled/calculated data, not measured locally)

== Bodies of water ==
=== Lakes ===
There are four major lakes in Mount Apo. Popular of these are Lake Agco, which used to be called "The Blue Lake", and Lake Venado, a well-known mountaineers camping site and a stopover towards the peak. Lake Macadac and Lake Jordan are found in the summit grassland.

=== Rivers ===
Mount Apo has 19 major rivers and 21 creeks draining its 8 major watersheds (PASAlist.1992). Out of the 19 major rivers, only two has studies as reported by SEA-BMB consultants for the Mt. Apo Geothermal Project Environmental Impact Assessment 1991. According to the report, there are two river ecosystems draining the geothermal site namely: (1) Marbel-Matingao river ecosystem- characterized by narrower river channels at highly elevated areas, much faster water flow, clearer water and rock boulder-rich water beds. The aquatic organisms in the area have expectedly lower biological productivity and species diversity. The report also concluded that this river ecosystem provides much less economic and commercial value for its biological production. The study identified 12 species of fish caught in the area; (2) Kabacan River- Pulangi River ecosystem- characterized by a much wider channels at flat areas, relatively much slower water flow, highly turbid waters and sandy mud river beds.

Mount Apo is a headwaters catchment area of several major river systems like the Marbel, Matingaw, Kabacan, Pulangi, Sibulan, and Digos rivers.

=== Waterfalls ===
The Tudaya Falls is a one-tier 150-metre-high (490 ft) waterfall in Mt. Apo Natural Park. This waterfall flows into the Sibulan River, which empties into the Davao Gulf.

== Flora and fauna ==
The grasslands of Mount Apo are dominated by Cogon grass (Imperata cylindrica) and Saccharum spontaneum. Other grasses and ferns also thrive, especially along banks of creeks, streams, and rivers and on steep slopes.

Mount Apo is home to over 272 bird species, 111 of which are endemic to the area. It is also home to one of the world's largest eagles, the critically endangered Philippine eagle, which is the country's national bird.

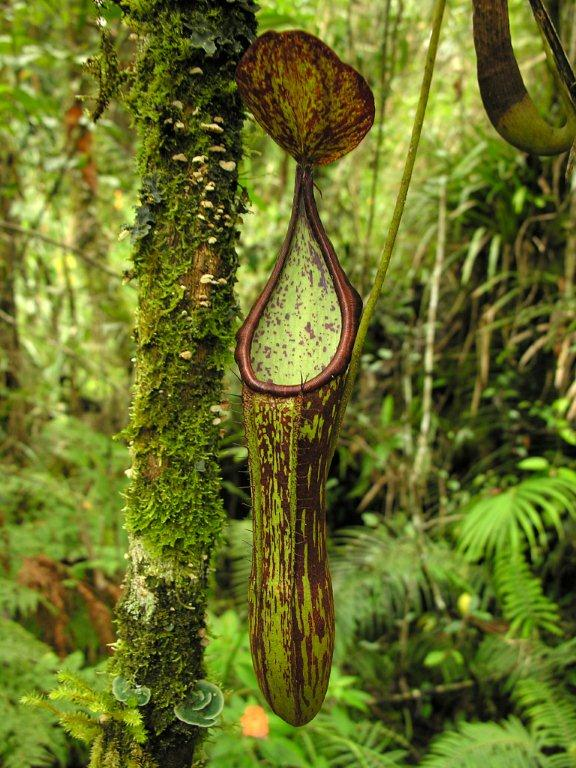
Nepenthes copelandii, a pitcher plant endemic to the mountains of Mindanao

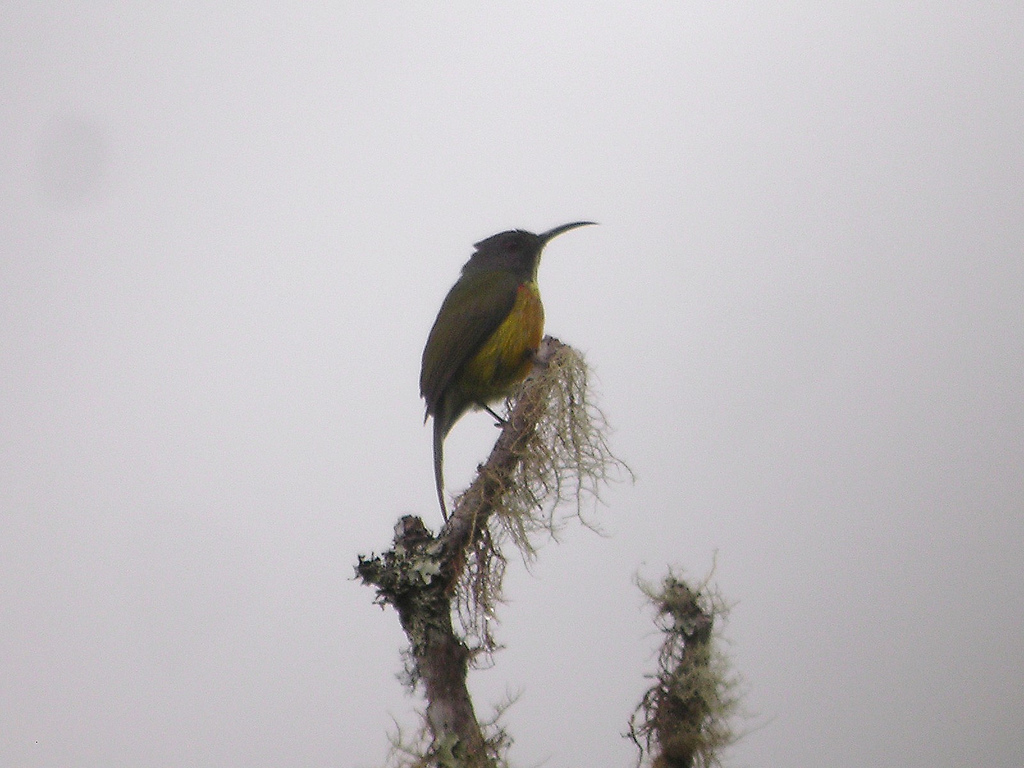
The Apo sunbird, a sunbird endemic to Mindanao

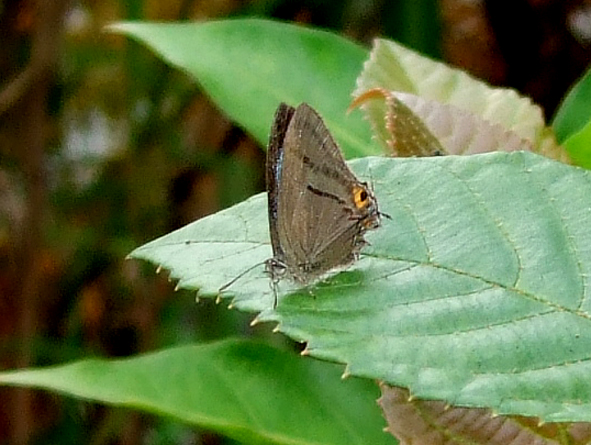
Tajuria igolotiana fumiae

== Energy ==
=== Geothermal energy ===
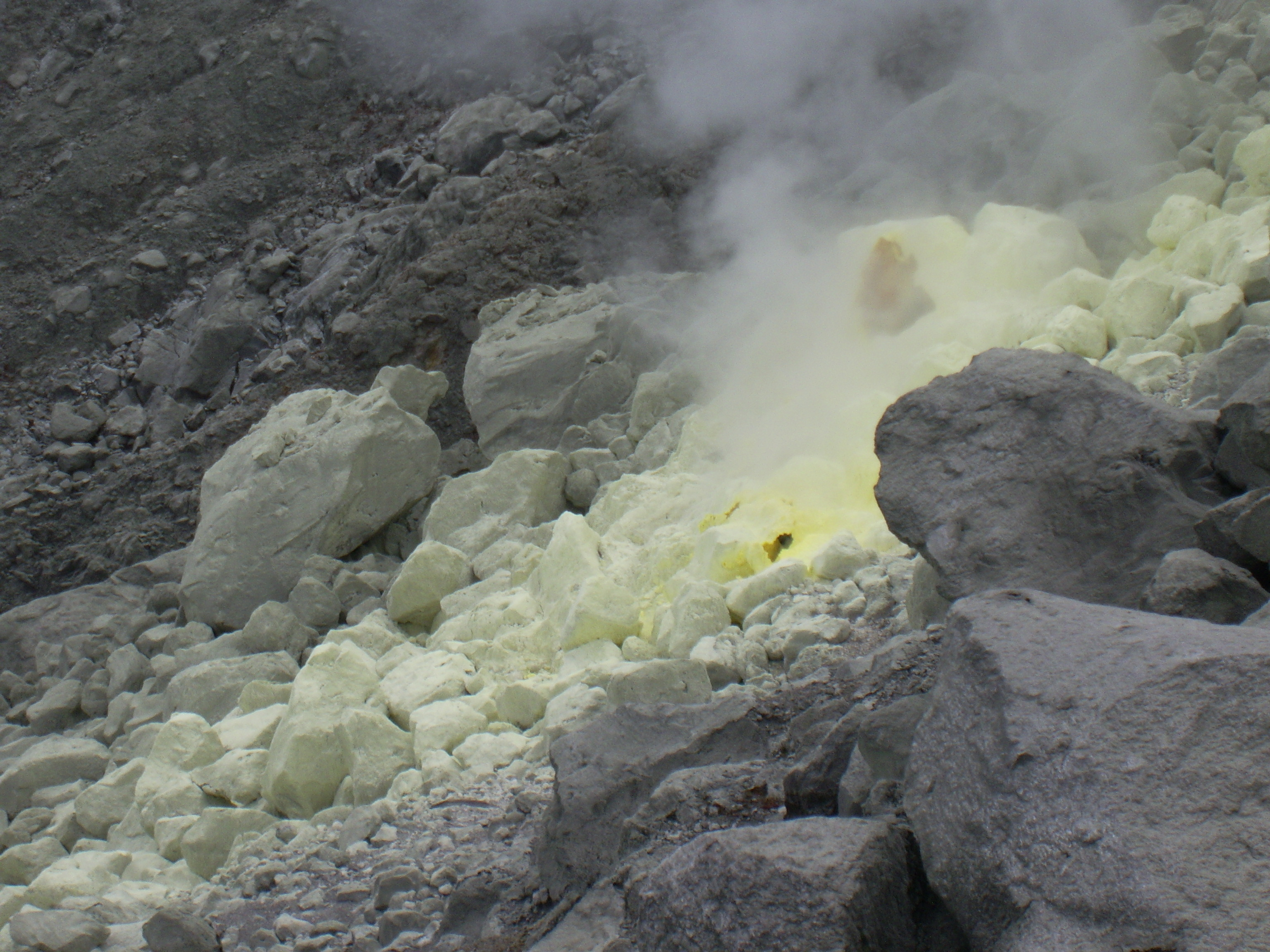
A sulfuric vent in Mount Apo

The Mt. Apo 1 and Mt. Apo 2 geothermal plants each has a rated capacity of 54.24 megawatts. Owned and operated by Energy Development Corporation (EDC), the power plants were commissioned in February 1997 (Mt. Apo 1) and June 1999 (Mt. Apo 2) respectively, under a build-operate owner contract arrangement. Located in Barangay Ilomavis, Kidapawan, Cotabato is the Mindanao Geothermal Production Field with a power output of 108.48 MW, currently the only power plant of its kind in Mindanao.

The Philippine National Oil Company geothermal plant supplies electricity to Kidapawan and its neighboring provinces, boosting the city's economy.

=== Hydroelectric plants ===
==== The Tudaya Hydropower Plant ====
The Tudaya Hydropower Plant, located near the foot of Mount Apo on the Davao side (Santa Cruz, Davao del Sur), is composed of two run-of-river type plants that will contribute to the energy needs of Mindanao by early 2014.

==== The Sibulan Hydroelectric Power Plant ====
The Sibulan Hydroelectric Power Plants have been generating 42.5 MW of clean and renewable energy for Davao since 2010. It is also composed of two run-of the river mini hydro power plants.

Sibulan A was completed and commissioned on December 26, 2010. Local residents who are mainly engaged in abaca and fruit farming have since benefited from the use of 44 kilometres (27 mi) of farm-to-market roads which were developed as access to the plants.

== Conservation ==
=== Mount Apo Natural Park ===
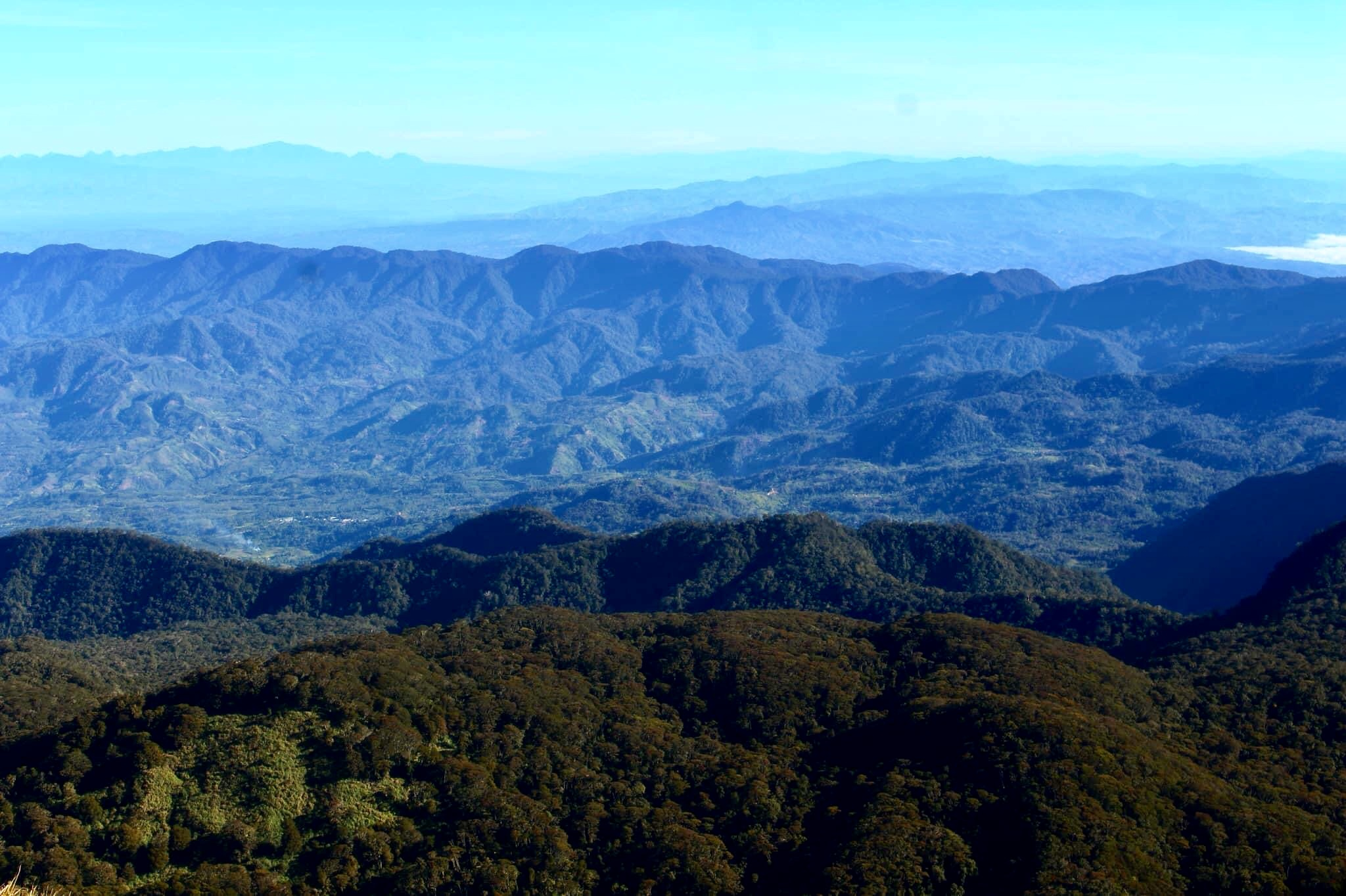
Mount Apo rainforest in 2021

On May 9, 1936, Mount Apo was declared a National Park with Proclamation No. 59 by President Manuel L. Quezon followed by Proclamation No. 35 of May 8, 1966, then Proclamation No. 882 of September 24, 1996. On February 3, 2004, President Gloria Macapagal-Arroyo approved Republic Act No. 9237, which established Mount Apo as a protected area under the category of Natural Park with an area of 54,974.87 hectares (135,845.9 acres); with two peripheral areas of 2,571.73 hectares (6,354.9 acres) and 6,506.40 hectares (16,077.7 acres) as buffer zones, provided for its management and for other purposes.

=== UNESCO World Heritage list ===
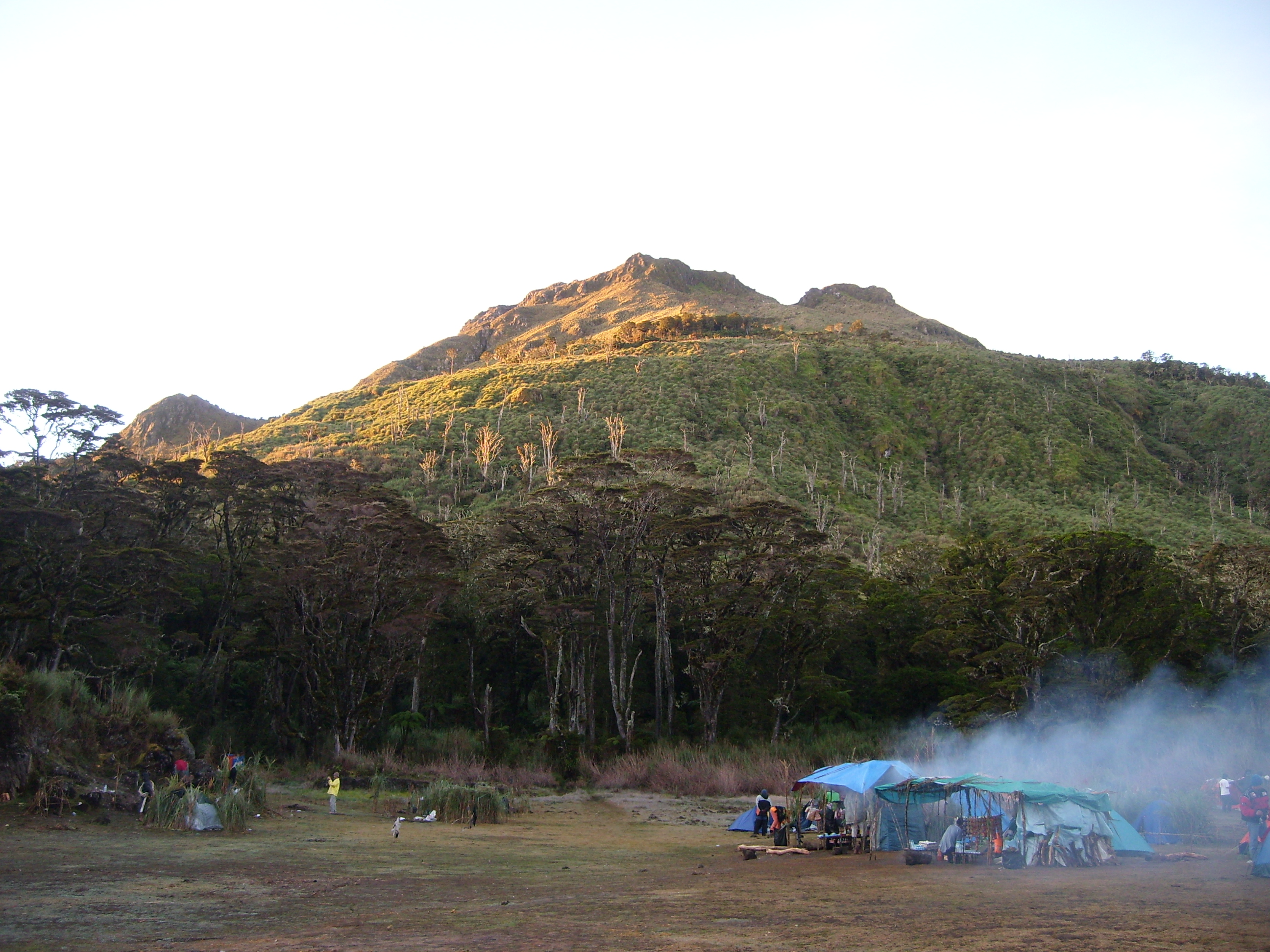
Forest clearing in Mount Apo's old-growth rainforest. Such clearing practices have now been permanently banned throughout the park and its buffer zones in a bid to strengthen the park's integrity for UNESCO designation.

In 1987, the National Geographic Society based in Washington, DC in the United States, published a book entitled, "Our World's Heritage", where Mount Apo was noted as a 'site of World Heritage caliber'. The cover of the book also featured Mount Apo's iconic Philippine eagle, along with three other heritage sites which have already been designated as "UNESCO World Heritage Sites".

The Department of Environment and Natural Resources (DENR) submitted Mount Apo on December 12, 2009, for inclusion in the UNESCO world heritage list. The mountain is considered by the DENR as the center of endemism in Mindanao. It has one of the highest land-based biological diversity in terms of flora and fauna per unit area. It has three distinct forest formations, from lowland tropical rainforest, to mid-mountain forests, and finally to high mountain forests.

In March 2015, Mount Apo was taken out from the UNESCO List of Tentative Sites due to the dramatic changes (such as logging, intrusion of companies and urban and agricultural landscape, exploitation, and poaching, among others) it experienced which does not constitute the UNESCO documents that describe the park. Better conservation and a change in the content of documents was recommended by UNESCO.

== Hiking activity ==
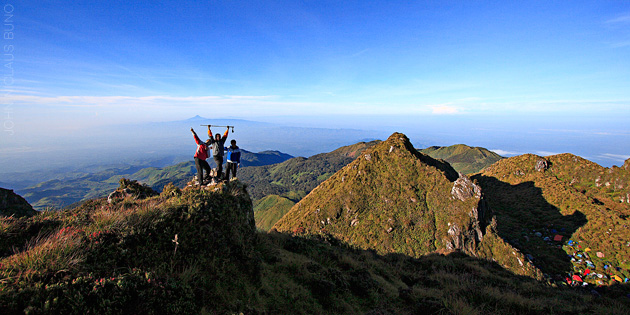
Hikers at the peak

At 2,954 meters (9,692 ft), Mount Apo is the highest mountain (peak) and volcano in the Philippines. It is one of the country's most popular hiking/climbing destinations.

The first two attempts to reach Mt. Apo's summit ended in failure: that of Jose Oyanguren (1852) and Señor Real (1870). The first recorded successful expedition was led by Don Joaquin Rajal on October 10, 1880. Prior to the climb, Rajal had to secure the permission of the Bagobo chieftain, Datu Manig. It is said that the Datu demanded that human sacrifice be made to please the god Mandarangan. But the datu agreed to waive this demand, and the climb commenced on October 6, 1880, succeeding five days later. Since then, numerous expeditions followed. These and more are described in colorful narrations by Fr. Miguel Bernad, S.J.

Several trails lead to the summit, coming from Cotabato and Davao provinces. Arguably the easiest route to the Natural Park is through Kidapawan with an average hike taking 3–4 days roundtrip. In the classification system used by local popular mountaineering website PinoyMountaineer.com, the difficulty of the hike is 7 out of 9. Various sights along the trail include Lake Venado (the highest lake in the Philippines), the solfataras, and the old crater near its summit.

== See also ==
- Philippine Institute of Volcanology and Seismology
  - List of active volcanoes in the Philippines
  - List of inactive volcanoes in the Philippines
  - List of potentially active volcanoes in the Philippines
- List of geothermal power plants in the Philippines
- List of protected areas of the Philippines
- List of Southeast Asian mountains
- ASEAN Heritage Parks
