= Batuling Bantayao Gumander =

Datu Batuling Bantayao Gumander
- Born: November 15, 1937; Tumingay, Bungabong, Maguindanao, Philippines
- Died: April 16, 1976 (aged 38); Tinedteban, Bungabong, Sultan Mastura, Maguindanao del Norte, Philippines
- Cause of death: Summary execution (Decapitation)
- Other names: Datu, First Martyr of Sultan Kudarat, Langkom Pangulima
- Occupations: Politician, Community leader, Revolutionary leader
- Years active: 1962–1976
- Office: Municipal Councilor, Vice Mayor of Sultan Kudarat, Chairman of the Political Committee of the MNLF
- Spouse: Undang Ara Butuan
- Children: Abdulhadie, Yacob, Nasibah, Mojahid
- Parents: Datu Salusub Gumander (father); Mamotri Bantayao (mother)
- Family: Gumander family

Datu Batuling Bantayao Gumander (November 15, 1937 – April 16, 1976) was a political leader, a community figure, and a resistance leader among the Moro people in the Philippines. He took on political roles in leading the community of the Sultan Kudarat municipality in Maguindanao province, and led the political wing of the Moro National Liberation Front (MNLF).

He is recognized in local accounts as the "First Martyr" of the Sultan Kudarat municipality following his summary execution by the Philippine Armed Forces during the martial law era under Ferdinand Marcos in 1972.

== Personal life ==
Batuling was born in the village of Bungabong in the municipality of Sultan Kudarat in Maguindanao province. He descends from the Gumander family; his father was Datu Salusub Gumander (known as "Ama i Angkog"), and his grandfather was the Muslim scholar and judge Datukali Gumander.

He married Undang Ara Butuan, who belongs to the "Bilawatao" family from the village of Mulaog in Sultan Kudarat, and had four children with her: Abdulhadie, Yacob, Nasibah, and Mojahid.

== Political career ==
List of Municipal Officials of Sultan Kudarat 1970-1971

Batuling Gumander began his career in public service as an elected and appointed official, rising through the political ranks in the municipality of Sultan Kudarat, where he held several positions:

- Municipal Councilor (Kagawad): He was first elected as First Municipal Councilor for the term (1962–1965), and was re-elected for a second term (1965–1968).
- Vice Mayor: During his third term, he was appointed Vice Mayor of Sultan Kudarat (1968–1970).
- He continued to perform his duties as Vice Mayor until 1971, following the death of former Vice Mayor Datu Mamur Matabalao, working alongside then-Mayor Hajj Datu Sangacala Baraguir (who governed the municipality between 1956 and 1971).

When Mayor Sanggacala Baraguir was appointed Governor of Maguindanao province, an official offer was made to Datu Batuling to assume the position of Mayor of Sultan Kudarat municipality. However, he refused the position, opting to leave formal government work and join the armed struggle.

== Role in the Bangsamoro struggle ==
Datu Batuling joined the Moro National Liberation Front (MNLF) in its formative years, working as a co-founder of the protest movement. He adopted a nom de guerre in the Iranun language, "Langkom Pangulima" (LANGKOM PNGULIMA), which translates to "Commander-in-Chief".

He assumed a leadership role by taking the position of Over All Chairman of the Political Committee (POLCOM) of the Front. He was also a founding member of the "Ansarul Islam" movement in the Sultan Kudarat area, a movement formed to protect Islamic identity and communities.

== Social standing ==
Datu Batuling participated in supporting his local community; sources indicate that he provided financial support to young people to help with marriage costs, and offered assistance to needy families in his area. This social activity contributed to establishing his position as a local leader among the residents of his town.

== Death (Execution) ==
On April 16, 1976, during the implementation of martial law under President Ferdinand Marcos, Datu Batuling was attacked by members of the Armed Forces of the Philippines (AFP) while he was with some of his men at his farm in the "Tinedteban" area (which is currently located within the municipality of Sultan Mastura).

According to local accounts, Datu Batuling resisted and refused to surrender even after his ammunition ran out. Following his death, military forces decapitated him and hung his head on a military tank, parading it through the villages; the tank was seen crossing the Simuay River. The burial site of his body and head remains unknown to this day, and his family has been unable to retrieve them.

As a result of this incident, the community bestowed upon him the title of "The First Martyr of Sultan Kudarat".

== See also ==
- Moro National Liberation Front
- Moro people
- Maguindanao
- Ferdinand Marcos
- Datukali Gumander
- Abdulhadi Butuan Gumander
