= Cotabato's 1st congressional district =

Legislative district of the Philippines

- Constituency for the House of Representatives of the Philippines
- Location of Cotabato within the Philippines
- Province: Cotabato
- Region: Soccsksargen
- Population: 403,870 (2024)
- Electorate: 246,037 (2025)
- Major settlements: 6 LGUs: Municipalities; Alamada; Aleosan; Libungan; Midsayap; Pigcawayan; Pikit
- Area: 2,420.58 km^{2} (934.59 sq mi)

Current constituency
- Created: 1987
- Representative: Edwin Cruzado
- Political party: Lakas–CMD
- Congressional bloc: Majority

Cotabato's 1st congressional district is one of the three congressional districts of the Philippines in the province of Cotabato. It has been represented in the House of Representatives since 1987. The district covers western Cotabato, bordered on three sides by the province of Maguindanao and which, since 2019, contains several exclaves of the Bangsamoro autonomous region. It consists of the municipalities of Alamada, Aleosan, Libungan, Midsayap, Pigcawayan and Pikit. Prior to redistricting in 2012, the district also included the municipalities of Banisilan, Carmen and Kabacan. It is currently represented in the 20th Congress by Edwin Cruzado of the Lakas–CMD.

== Representation history ==
#	Image	Member	Term of office		Congress	Party	Electoral history	Constituent LGUs
#	Image	Member	Start	End	Congress	Party	Electoral history	Constituent LGUs
=== Cotabato's 1st district for the House of Representatives of the Philippines ===
District created February 2, 1987 from Cotabato's at-large district.
1		Rodrigo B. Gutang	June 30, 1987	June 30, 1992	8th	PDP–Laban	Elected in 1987.	1987–2013; Alamada, Aleosan, Banisilan, Carmen, Kabacan, Libungan, Midsayap, Pigcawayan, Pikit
2		Anthony P. Dequiña	June 30, 1992	June 30, 2001	9th	NPC	Elected in 1992.	1987–2013; Alamada, Aleosan, Banisilan, Carmen, Kabacan, Libungan, Midsayap, Pigcawayan, Pikit
2		Anthony P. Dequiña	June 30, 1992	June 30, 2001	10th	NPC	Re-elected in 1995.	1987–2013; Alamada, Aleosan, Banisilan, Carmen, Kabacan, Libungan, Midsayap, Pigcawayan, Pikit
2		Anthony P. Dequiña	June 30, 1992	June 30, 2001	11th	LAMMP	Re-elected in 1998.	1987–2013; Alamada, Aleosan, Banisilan, Carmen, Kabacan, Libungan, Midsayap, Pigcawayan, Pikit
3		Emmylou Taliño-Mendoza	June 30, 2001	June 30, 2010	12th	Independent	Elected in 2001.	1987–2013; Alamada, Aleosan, Banisilan, Carmen, Kabacan, Libungan, Midsayap, Pigcawayan, Pikit
3		Emmylou Taliño-Mendoza	June 30, 2001	June 30, 2010	13th	Nacionalista	Re-elected in 2004.	1987–2013; Alamada, Aleosan, Banisilan, Carmen, Kabacan, Libungan, Midsayap, Pigcawayan, Pikit
3		Emmylou Taliño-Mendoza	June 30, 2001	June 30, 2010	14th	Lakas	Re-elected in 2007.	1987–2013; Alamada, Aleosan, Banisilan, Carmen, Kabacan, Libungan, Midsayap, Pigcawayan, Pikit
4		Jesus N. Sacdalan	June 30, 2010	June 30, 2019	15th	Liberal	Elected in 2010.	1987–2013; Alamada, Aleosan, Banisilan, Carmen, Kabacan, Libungan, Midsayap, Pigcawayan, Pikit
4		Jesus N. Sacdalan	June 30, 2010	June 30, 2019	16th	Liberal	Re-elected in 2013.	2013–present Alamada, Aleosan, Libungan, Midsayap, Pigcawayan, Pikit
4		Jesus N. Sacdalan	June 30, 2010	June 30, 2019	17th	PDP–Laban	Re-elected in 2016.	2013–present Alamada, Aleosan, Libungan, Midsayap, Pigcawayan, Pikit
5		Joselito S. Sacdalan	June 30, 2019	June 30, 2025	18th	PDP–Laban	Elected in 2019.	2013–present Alamada, Aleosan, Libungan, Midsayap, Pigcawayan, Pikit
5		Joselito S. Sacdalan	June 30, 2019	June 30, 2025	19th	NPC	Re-elected in 2022.	2013–present Alamada, Aleosan, Libungan, Midsayap, Pigcawayan, Pikit
6		Edwin L. Cruzado	June 30, 2025	Incumbent	20th	PMP	Elected in 2025.	2013–present Alamada, Aleosan, Libungan, Midsayap, Pigcawayan, Pikit
6		Edwin L. Cruzado	June 30, 2025	Incumbent	20th	Lakas	Elected in 2025.	2013–present Alamada, Aleosan, Libungan, Midsayap, Pigcawayan, Pikit

== Election results ==
=== 2025 ===
Candidate	Party	Votes	%
Edwin Cruzado	Pwersa ng Masang Pilipino	98,210	50.92
Joel Sacdalan (incumbent)	Nationalist People's Coalition	94,679	49.08
Total		192,889	100.00
Registered voters/turnout		246,037	–
Pwersa ng Masang Pilipino gain from Nationalist People's Coalition			
Source: Commission on Elections

=== 2010 ===
Philippine House of Representatives election at Cotabato's 1st district
Party	Candidate	Votes	%
Lakas–Kampi	Jesus Sacdalan	88,683	40.26
NPC	Anthony Dequiña	51,097	23.20
GAD	Luzviminda Tan	47,677	21.64
Liberal	Ronaldo Pader	18,502	8.40
Independent	Dan Ebo	1,467	0.66
Valid ballots		207,426	94.16
Invalid or blank votes		12,854	5.84
Total votes		220,280	100.00
Lakas–Kampi hold			

== See also ==
- Legislative districts of Cotabato
