= Candaba Swamp =

Wetlands in Pampanga, Philippines

Coordinates: 15°10′N 120°51′E

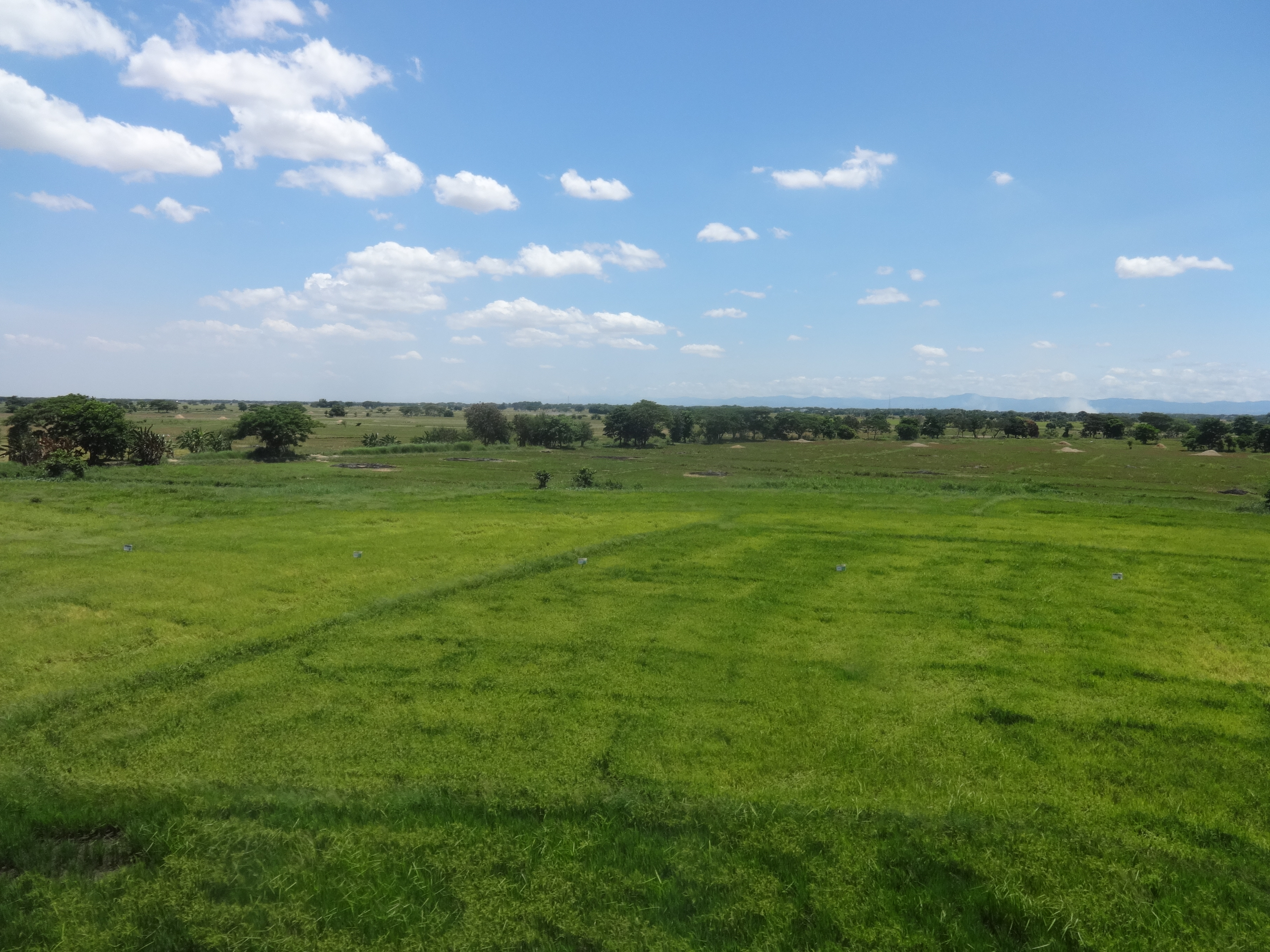
Candaba Swamp

Candaba Swamp is located in Pampanga and Bulacan provinces, 60 km (37 mi) northeast of Manila in the Philippines. It encompasses about 32,000 ha (79,000 acres), made of freshwater ponds, swamps and marshes surrounded by seasonally flooded grasslands. The entire area becomes submerged underwater during the wet season. It dries out during the months of November to April, then the swamp is converted to farmland by the locals. Watermelon and rice are usually planted, comprising the vegetation of the floodplain, together with patches of nipa palm and some mangrove species.

The Candaba swamp also acts as a natural flood retention basin during the rainy season. It holds the overflow from five smaller rivers (Maasim, San Miguel, Garlang, Bulu and Peñaranda), then drains into the larger Pampanga River.

== See also ==
- Agusan Marsh
- Liguasan Marsh
- Libungan River
