= Asik-Asik Falls =

Waterfall in the Philippines

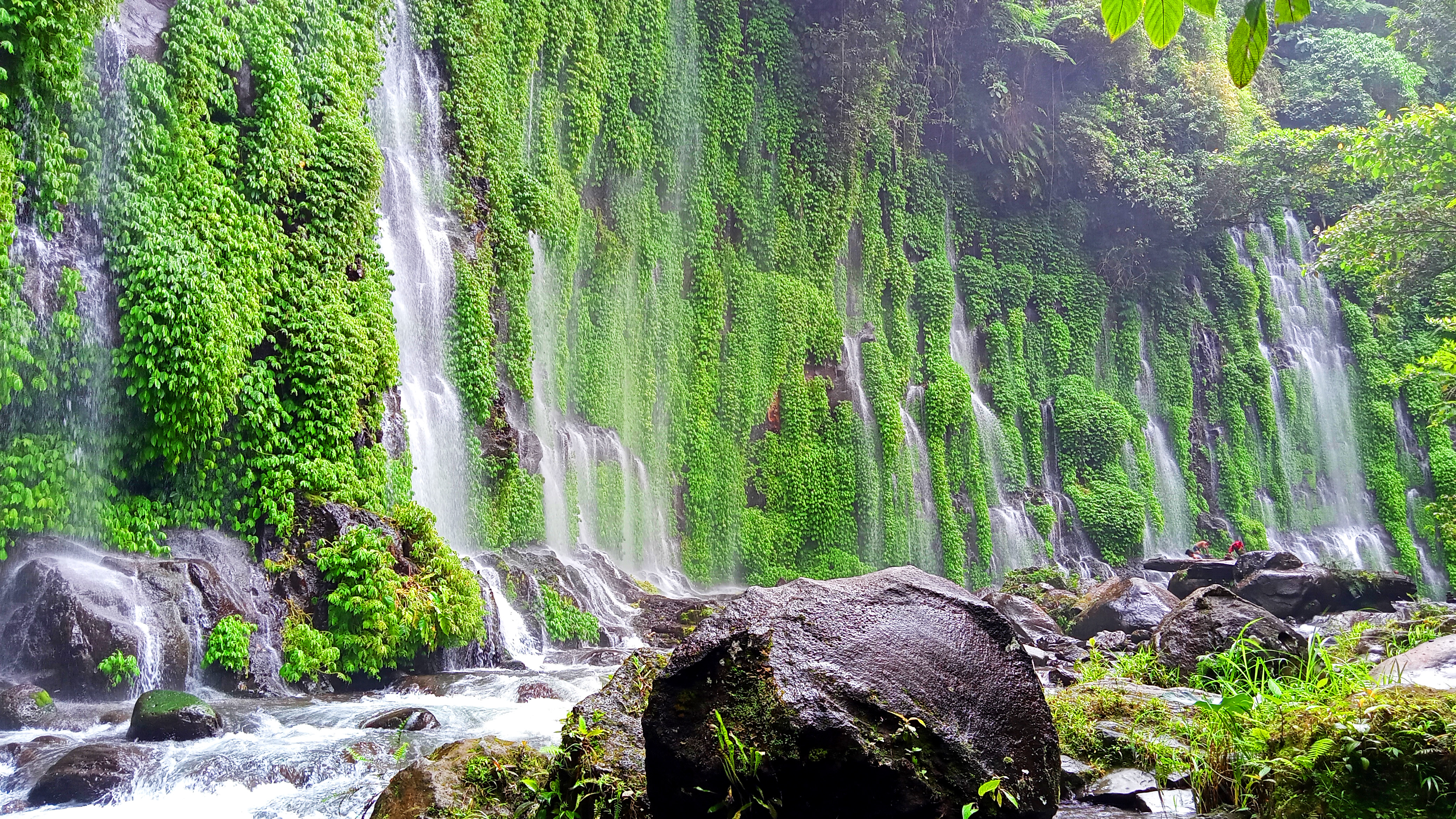
- The falls in 2022

- Location within Philippines
- Location: Alamada, Cotabato
- Coordinates: 7.5615°N 124.5354°E
- Longest drop: 60 m (200 ft)
- Total width: 140 m (460 ft)

Asik-Asik Falls, also known as Curtain Waterfalls, is a waterfall near Alamada in Cotabato, the Philippines, on the slopes of Mount Ragang. It is known for an apparent lack of a river feeding the fall, with water coming out of crevices on a 60-metre (200 ft) cliff instead. Asik means "sprinkle" in the Hiligaynon language. Much of the falls are surrounded and covered by lush vegetation, such as ferns and moss. It is theorized that the source of the falls is an underground river. The pool at the bottom flows into the Alamada River, a tributary of the Libungan River, and then into the Liguasan Marsh.

Asik-Asik Falls were accidentally discovered in late 2010 when Jun Miranda, a member of a barangay council, explored the area when assessing the damage from some forest fires, landslides, and floods that had impacted the region. The villagers in Dulao already knew of the falls' existence and its unusual aspects, but they did not make a big deal of it, as it was very forested and relatively inaccessible. Miranda told the council about what he had discovered, and many officials went to see it for themselves. They uploaded images to social media, which quickly spread.

In July 2013, a picture of the falls taken by Ernestina Jacinta became one of the grand winners in a photo contest run by the state-owned Philippine Amusement and Gaming Corporation. The falls were closed for tourism for two months in 2014 after a cholera outbreak in the surrounding villages. In late 2018, rocks were taken from the site to be studied at a laboratory. On December 11, 2019, a team from the Mines and Geosciences Bureau visited the waterfalls. After the visit, the Mines and Geosciences Bureau sent a report to the National Committee on Geological Sciences to have it declared a national geological monument.

== See also ==
- List of waterfalls
