= Speckled reed warbler =

Conservation status
- Critically Endangered (IUCN 3.1)

Scientific classification
- Kingdom: Animalia
- Phylum: Chordata
- Class: Aves
- Order: Passeriformes
- Family: Acrocephalidae
- Genus: Acrocephalus
- Species: A. sorghophilus

Binomial name
- Acrocephalus sorghophilus (R. Swinhoe, 1863)
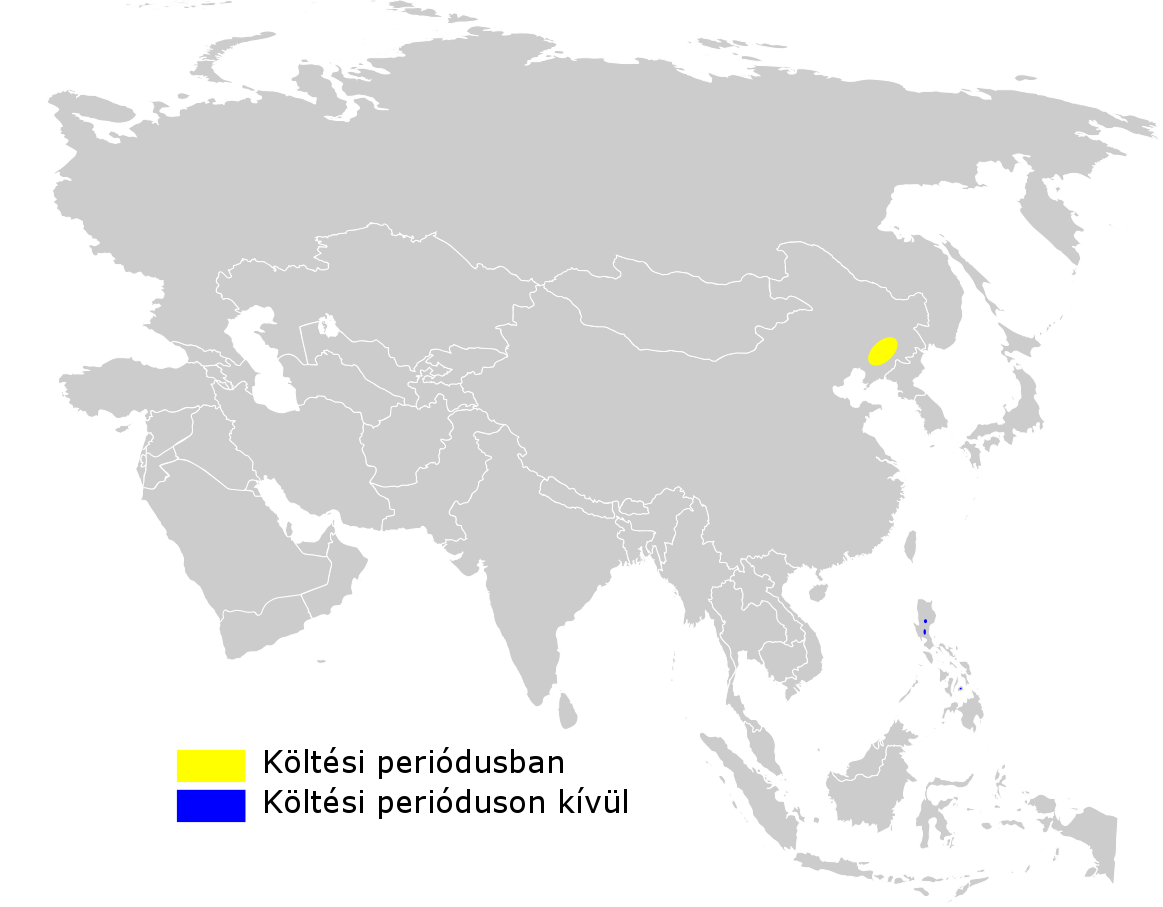
- Distribution of Speckled Reed Warbler Breeding Non-breeding

Species of bird

The speckled reed warbler or streaked reed warbler (Acrocephalus sorghophilus) is an Old World warbler in the family Acrocephalidae. The species was first described by Robert Swinhoe in 1863.

It is found in China and the Philippines. Its natural habitats are swamps and arable land. It is threatened by habitat loss, particularly wetland loss in its wintering area of Candaba Swamp.

== Habitat and conservation status ==
On passage, it has been recorded in marshland and millet crops, and it occurs near the water in reed and grass marshes in the winter. It possibly uses willow scrub and reedbeds in its breeding range. It probably feeds largely on invertebrates and may consume seeds but more research is needed. Spring passage in China is from late May to early June, with autumn passage from late August to early September. All Philippine records are from September to June.

IUCN has assessed this bird as critically endangered with the population estimated at just 250 to 999 mature individuals and continuing to decline. This species' main threat is habitat loss with wholesale clearance of wetland habitats particularly the only known wintering ground in Candaba Swamp which has been converted into agricultural lands, particularly for rice.

The Candaba Swamp is a Ramsar site; however, habitat conversion and hunting still continues.

Conservation actions proposed include attempting to locate the breeding areas in China and Russia; surveying wetlands in the Philippines to try and locate further wintering sites; and initiating a new ringing programme at Dalton Pass and other migrant trapping locations. Investigation of the potential for stable isotope analysis of museum specimens could identify areas in which the species breeds. Finally, it should be listed as a protected species in China.
