= Jose Tejada =

Filipino politician (born 1958)

Member of the Philippine House of Representatives from Cotabato's 3rd district
- In office June 30, 2013 – June 30, 2022
- Preceded by: District established
- Succeeded by: Samantha Santos

Member of the Cotabato Provincial Board from the 2nd district
- In office June 30, 2004 – June 30, 2013
- In office June 30, 1992 – June 30, 2001

Vice Governor of Cotabato
- In office March 1998 – June 30, 1998
- Governor: Agnes Amador
- Preceded by: Agnes Amador
- Succeeded by: Jesus N. Sacdalan

Personal details
- Born: June 10, 1958 (age 68) Cotabato City, Philippines
- Party: Nacionalista
- Education: University of Santo Tomas; San Sebastian College-Recoletos

Jose "Pingping" Inserto Tejada (born June 10, 1958) is a Filipino politician who served as the Representative of Cotabato's 3rd district from 2013 to 2022. He previously served as a member of the Cotabato Provincial Board from 1992 to 2001 and from 2004 to 2013. He briefly served as Vice Governor of Cotabato in 1998, by virtue of succession.

== Personal life ==
Pingping Tejada is the Son of Lawyer Enriqueto Fernandez Tejada and RTC Judge Fabiana Yerro Inserto. He graduated as class salutatorian of Mlang National High School in 1974. He took Bachelor of Arts in Economics from the University of Santo Tomas and graduated in 1979. He subsequently earned his Bachelor of Laws degree in 1984 from the College of Law-San Sebastian College, Manila.

“Pingping” as he is known to family and friends, when outside politics, is a simple farmer in the Municipality of Mlang, Cotabato. He is married to Nelda O. Tejada with whom he is blessed with three children.

== Political career ==
Before his election to public office, Pingping Tejada was a Para Legal Officer at the Department of Agrarian Reform. It was during this time that he became immersed with the plight of our farmers and countryside workers. This inspired him to action, seeking to improve the livelihood of those in the rural and farming communities. In 1992 when he was elected as Provincial Board Member, he devoted much of his time working on the promotion and advancement of rural development initiatives in the Province of Cotabato. In his eighteen (18) years as Sangguniang Panlalawigan Member, he was instrumental in the passage of various landmark legislations to include, among others, the enactment of the Provincial Cooperative Code, Cotabato Health Insurance Program, Provincial Disaster Risk Reduction and Management Code and the creation of an additional Congressional District for the Province of Cotabato. In 1998, by virtue of succession, he assumed office as Vice Governor of the Province of Cotabato and was dubbed as Cotabato's "Centennial Vice Governor" as the nation was celebrating its centennial anniversary during his Vice-Governorship.

In 2013 he was elected via landslide victory to become the inaugural holder of the newly created 3rd Congressional District of Cotabato. He was re-elected in 2016 by an overwhelming majority against his closest political rival. His unprecedented political feat remains unmatched, as he run unopposed for his 3rd term as Congressman in the 2019 elections.

On July 10, 2020, He is one of the 11 representatives who voted to grant the franchise renewal of ABS-CBN and one of the three Mindanaoans to grant the franchise.

== Congress ==
Together with congressmen he was able to pass nationally-significant legislations to include the Free Irrigation Act (RA 10969); the Universal Access to Quality Education Act (RA 10931); the Credit Surety Fund Cooperative Act Of 2015 (RA 10744); the Iskolar ng Bayan Act of 2015 (RA 10648); and the Mandatory Philhealth for Senior Citizens Act (RA 10645). He is also a staunch advocate for the protection and preservation of North Cotabato’s environment and natural resources, being the principal author of House Bill 3119 which seeks to declare the entire province of North Cotabato as Mining-Free Zone.

Aside from his legislative accomplishments, Congressman Tejada has successfully delivered countless infrastructure and social services to his constituents. During his first and second term as congressman, he was able to lobby for additional budget to build roads, classroom buildings, birthing centers, water system, irrigation canals, barangay halls and other much needed infrastructure services that offer inclusive social and economic benefits to the people of the 3rd Congressional District of North Cotabato.

He is a member of various Congressional Committees and Vice-Chairman of the influential House Committee on Appropriations.

== Awards and honors ==
In 2018, he was a recipient of the Thomasian Alumni Award for Government Service from the University of Santo Tomas Alumni Association, for being an outstanding alumnus who served as catalyst for change in public service. He was also a recipient of the 2016 Idol at Kabalikat ng TESDA Award for his significant contributions in the improvement of technical-vocational education and training (TVET) in the country.
