= M'lang River =

River in Cotabato, Philippines

- Location within Mindanao mainland Location within Philippines

Location
- Country: Philippines
- Region: Soccsksargen
- Province: Cotabato
- Municipality: M'lang

Physical characteristics
- Mouth
  - location: Liguasan Marsh
  - coordinates: 6°54′37″N 124°49′53″E
- Length: 62 km (39 mi)

Basin features
- Progression: M'lang–Liguasan Marsh–Mindanao

The M'lang River is a river located in the municipality of M'lang in Cotabato province in the Philippines. It directs from Liguasan Marsh to Pulangi River basin in flow of Mindanao River.
