= Abdulhadi Butuan Gumander =

Abdulhadie Butuan Gumander
- Born: August 16, 1970 (age 56); Bungabong, Sultan Kudarat (now Sultan Mastura), Maguindanao del Norte, Philippines
- Other names: Ibn Al-Shaheed, Manda
- Citizenship: Bangsamoro, Filipino
- Education: Islamic University of Madinah
- Occupations: Islamic scholar, government consultant, Islamic preacher
- Parents: Batuling Gumander (father); Undang Ara Butuan (mother)

Abdulhadie Butuan Gumander (known as "Manda" and by the title "Ibn Al-Shaheed") (born August 16, 1970) is a Filipino Islamic scholar and government official from the Moro people. He served as the Secretary-General of the League of Muslim Scholars in the Philippines, Vice President of the Supreme Council of Ulama in the Philippines for Peace and Development for the Maguindanao region, and worked as a consultant in the Office of the Chief Minister in the Bangsamoro Autonomous Region in Muslim Mindanao. He has been involved in the peace process in the southern Philippines.

== Early life and family ==
Gumander was born on August 16, 1970, in the village of Bungabong in the municipality of Sultan Kudarat (now known as the municipality of Sultan Mastura) in the province of Northern Maguindanao in the Philippines, to the Gumander family. His father is Batuling Gumander, one of the founders of the Ansar al-Islam group, and a political commander in the Moro National Liberation Front, who served as the vice mayor of the municipality in Sultan Kudarat until 1971 and was known by the title "Langkum Pangulima," meaning General Commander.

His mother is Bai Undang Ara Butuan, who descends from the lineage of Bilawatao, the half-brother of Datukali Gumander. He is the eldest son in his family and has three siblings: Yacob, Nasibah, and Mojahid.

== Education ==
He received his primary and secondary education at the Cotabato Islamic Institute in Cotabato City and later obtained a bachelor's degree in political science from Shariff Kabunsuan College in the Philippines. He began his overseas educational journey by studying at the Religious Institute in the Cordoba region of Kuwait in 1986. In 1993, he moved to study Islamic law (Sharia) at the Islamic University of Madinah in Saudi Arabia.

== Career and administration ==
Abdulhadie held several governmental and diplomatic positions during his career. He worked as a consultant in the Office of the Chief Minister in the Bangsamoro Autonomous Region. In 2007, he founded and managed the Bangsamoro Foreign Information Center. Through his management of the center, he briefed Arab media on the developments of the Moro issue and served as a source for details of the Comprehensive Agreement on the Bangsamoro and the formation of the Bangsamoro Transition Authority to Arab publications.

He was a member of the General Secretariat affiliated with the Central Committee of the Moro Islamic Liberation Front (MILF). It is reported that he received a directive letter in May 2002 from the late founder of the Moro Islamic Liberation Front, Sheikh Salamat Hashim, regarding the negotiating position and the establishment of a truce with the Philippine government to achieve peace. He represented the MILF as an envoy abroad and as its delegate in the State of Kuwait, and met with the Vice Chairman of the Indonesian People's Consultative Assembly in Jakarta to discuss the peace process. He supports the Bangsamoro Organic Law (BOL/BBL).

He also served as a spokesperson and head of the steering committee for the "Recover BARMM Now" coalition, which organized demonstrations in Cotabato with an estimated 400,000 participants according to official registration records, demanding the full implementation of the Comprehensive Agreement on the Bangsamoro (CAB).

== Role in UNICEF and humanitarian work ==
Abdulhadie served as the head of the MILF liaison officers team in its partnership with the United Nations Children's Fund (UNICEF). In this role, he was involved in efforts to disarm children associated with armed conflict and reintegrate them into society as part of an action plan with the United Nations. He supervised, alongside social workers, the rehabilitation of 1,869 children discharged from conflict, and coordinated with the military commands of the Bangsamoro Islamic Armed Forces across several camps to facilitate the entry of specialists and the implementation of child protection mechanisms.

== Dawah efforts and interfaith dialogue ==
He began his Dawah (Islamic proselytization) career by participating in the establishment of the Islamic Heritage Center in Cotabato City in 1989. He worked as a preacher for the International Islamic Relief Organization in 1990 and as an assistant to the delegate of the Muslim World League in the Philippines in 1991. He was also a member of the Philippine Darul Ifta.

He led efforts to spread Islam in remote Philippine villages. In November 2007, his seminars resulted in the conversion of 170 tribal leaders to Islam in the village of Baguas. He also supervised the construction of mosques with the support of Kuwaiti philanthropists, such as the Ajeel Al-Ajeel Mosque.

=== Combating extremism and guiding religious discourse ===
He served as the Secretary-General of the League of Muslim Scholars in the Philippines (Hay-atul Ulama) until the end of his term on November 15, 2021. On July 6, 2025, he was appointed Vice President of the Supreme Council of Ulama in the Philippines for Peace and Development for the Maguindanao region. He supervised training programs for imams and preachers, guiding them to use Friday sermons to address violent extremism. He founded the Bangsamoro Dawah Academy, which aims to spread the message of Islam.

In September 2016, through the League of Ulama, he contributed to holding the First General Conference of Bangsamoro Ulama, which aimed to formulate an Islamic stance to confront the expansion of the Islamic State (ISIS) in the region. He supported the fatwa issued by the Bangsamoro Darul Ifta on June 25, 2017, which mandated confronting armed terrorist groups, following the ISIS siege of Marawi. He is the Chairman of the Founding and advisory board of the Philippine Islamic Heritage Organization, expanding educational partnerships by signing agreements with institutions such as the branch of Imam Mohammad Ibn Saud Islamic University in Jakarta. As head of the Philippine Islamic Heritage Organization, he issued a statement in August 2022 condemning suicide attacks and terrorist bombings.

He headed more than 15 Hajj missions and 30 Umrah missions.

=== Interfaith dialogue and peaceful coexistence ===
He founded the "Religious Leaders for Intercultural Transformative Peace" initiative and served as its general coordinator. He represented the Moro Liberation Front's "Dawah Committee for Non-Muslim Affairs" in interfaith dialogues. He also participated as a lecturer with Bangsamoro government ministries, presenting a paper titled "My Job, My Ibadah" at Bangsamoro Women Commission symposia, and delivering lectures on peace in Islam to employees of the Ministry of Basic, Higher and Technical Education.

=== Dawah and administrative activities in Kuwait ===
He moved to work in the State of Kuwait in 1997 with the Islam Presentation Committee, becoming the head of the Dawah and Guidance Department and the official in charge of the Filipino community's affairs in 2001. He was appointed executive director of the Kuwaiti Philippine Cultural Center upon its establishment in 2006. During this time, he served as the head of the Filipino Muslim community in Kuwait, representing it in official forums in coordination with the Philippine embassy. He also served as chairman of the Board of Directors of the United Overseas Bangsamoro (UOB - Kuwait Chapter).

His work focused on new converts from the Filipino community, organizing Hajj and Umrah trips for them. In 2014, in cooperation with the United Overseas Bangsamoro and the Kuwaiti Ministry of Awqaf, he organized a ceremony at the Grand Mosque in Kuwait.

== Works ==
- Co-authored the book "The Doctrine of Redemption in Islam," published by the Islam Presentation Committee in Saudi Arabia.
- Authored the book "The Dawn of a New Life".
- Prepared an "Illustrated Memo" to teach ablution and prayer in the Tagalog language during his studies at the Religious Institute in Kuwait.
- A book and scientific research titled: "Pledge of Allegiance in Islam (Bangsamoro Government): Fatwas and Studies".
- A Dawah book titled: "Keys to Hearts for Entering Islam".

== See also ==
- Moro Islamic Liberation Front
- Datukali Gumander
- Batuling Gumander
- Moro people
- Bangsamoro
