= Libungan =

Municipality in Cotabato, Philippines

- Municipality
- Municipality of Libungan
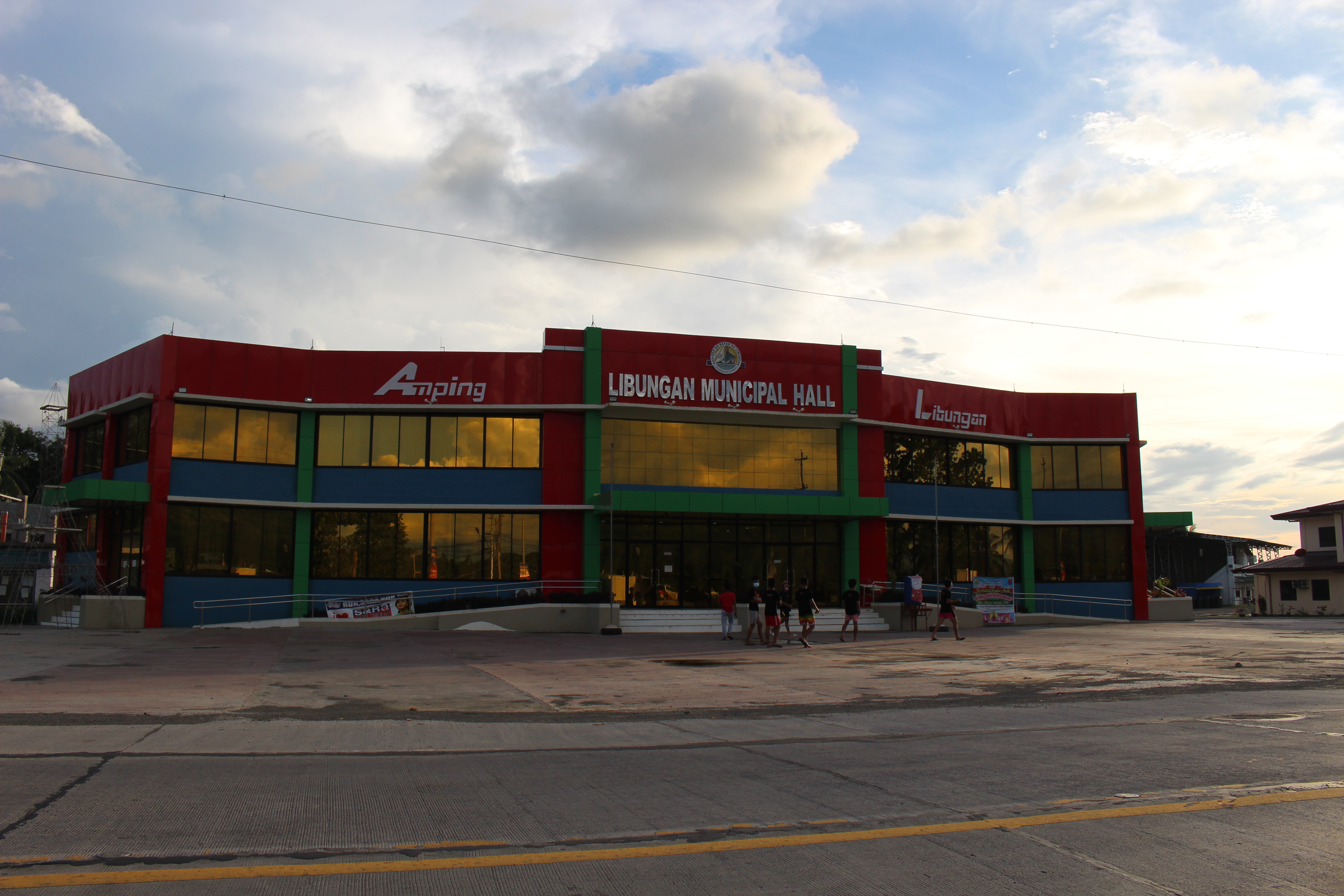
- Municipal Hall of Libungan

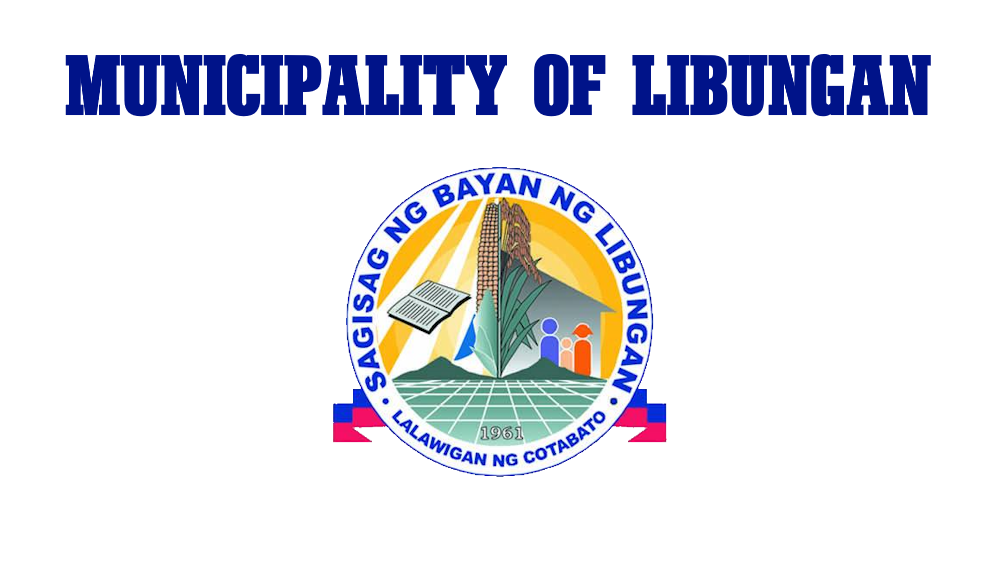
- Flag Seal

- Map of Cotabato with Libungan highlighted
- Interactive map of Libungan
- Location within the Philippines
- Coordinates: 7°14′36″N 124°31′00″E
- Country: Philippines
- Region: Soccsksargen
- Province: Cotabato
- District: 1st district
- Founded: January 27, 1968
- Barangays: 20 (see Barangays)

Government
  - Type: Sangguniang Bayan
  - Mayor: Angel Rose L. Cuan, CE
  - Vice Mayor: Jims C. Fullecido
  - Representative: Joselito S. Sacdalan
  - Electorate: 36,630 voters (2025)

Area
  - Total: 172.50 km^{2} (66.60 sq mi)
- Elevation: 42 m (138 ft)
- Highest elevation: 407 m (1,335 ft)
- Lowest elevation: 7 m (23 ft)

Population (2024 census)
  - Total: 57,776
  - Density: 334.93/km^{2} (867.47/sq mi)
  - Households: 14,026

Economy
  - Income class: 1st municipal income class
  - Poverty incidence: 19.7% (2023)
  - Revenue: ₱ 269.6 million (2024)
  - Assets: ₱ 672.6 million (2024)
  - Expenditure: ₱ 257.7 million (2024)
  - Liabilities: ₱ 136.9 million (2024)

Service provider
  - Electricity: Cotabato Electric Cooperative (COTELCO)
- Time zone: UTC+8 (PST)
- ZIP code: 9411
- PSGC: 1204705000
- IDD : area code: +63 (0)64
- Native languages: Hiligaynon; Cebuano; Maguindanao; Ilianen; Tagalog
- Website: www.libungan.gov.ph

Libungan, officially the Municipality of Libungan , (Note: (Maguindanaon: Inged nu Libungan, Jawi: ايڠايد نو ليبوڠن; Iranun: Inged a Libungan, ايڠايد ا ليبوڠن; Hiligaynon: Banwa sang Libungan; Cebuano: Lungsod sa Libungan; Tagalog: Bayan ng Libungan)) is a municipality in the province of Cotabato, Philippines. According to the 2024 census, it has a population of 57,776 people.

== Etymology ==
Libungan was known by various names by its early settlers. The Manobo settlers of the area initially called the area as "Dasdas" which means "road down by the river". "Libungan" is used to refer to the river located in the area by the Manobo which means "cheater." During the earlier settling period, the Libungan River changed its course which adversely affected the crops which led the settlers to believe that the river was "cheating" them; the area from then on was referred to as Libungan. "Tubak" is one of the earlier names used to refer to the place which means "eroding river".

== History ==
The Manobo are the earlier settlers of the place and was eventually settled by other ethnic groups mainly by Cebuanos from Cebu who found the place suitable for them because of its terrain. Many immigrants from Luzon and Visayas came to settle in Libungan in the early 1930s. During World War II, the area of Demapaco was used by guerrillas as hideouts and the Libungan River became a battleground. After the Liberation in 1945, more settlers came to Libungan who cleared the forest and used the area's fertile lands for agriculture.

In 1955, when Libungan was still a part of Midsayap, many Libungan residents were elected to the Municipal Council of Midsayap. The Midsayap Municipal Council passed a resolution to the Provincial Government which in turn pass a similar resolution to the national government which seeks to create the Municipality of Libungan. Libungan was established as a separate municipality on August 7, 1961. Under Executive Order No. 414 dated January 27, 1961, Libungan was established as a regular municipality with 14 barangays. The number of barangays within Libungan increased to 32 in the following years but in 1969, Alamada, a new municipality was created from some of Libungan's barangays.

After the creation of Alamada, the municipality maintained its 19 barangays, part of which are the former barangays of Midsayap, namely Libungan (Poblacion), Barongis, Cabaruyan, Batiocan, Sinawingan, Baguer, Montay and Demapaco. Other barangays that compose the municipality are Abaga, Cabpangi, Grebona, Gumaga, Kapayawi, Kiloyao, Malengen, Sinapangan, Kitubod, Nicaan and Palakat, which later became defunct. Under Resolution No. 35 dated December 14, 1978, Palao and Ulamian was established with the total number of barangays of Libungan becoming 20.

Libungan was affected by two fires which had a socio-economic implications to the municipality which destroyed a commercial establishment and local government building. The former occurred on January 16, 1979, and the later occurred on February 17, 1986. A week after the second fire, the EDSA Revolution occurred which led to the installation of Corazon Aquino as president after Ferdinand Marcos was deposed. Reorganization of political leadership was made and Libungan was affected.

=== Possible isolation due to future establishment of Bangsamoro ===
During the 2001 Referendum for inclusion to the Autonomous Region in Muslim Mindanao, two (2) out of twenty-eight (28) barangays of Carmen, Cotabato chose to be part of ARMM, but were excluded because they are not connected to the main region of ARMM. During 2010–2016 Administration, the Bangsamoro idea sprouted and a newly proposed region was in the making. According to the agreements signed by the Moro Islamic Liberation Front and the Administration of Benigno Aquino III, Carmen will be included in Bangsamoro because of the two out of twenty-eight barangays that voted in favor of joining the Muslim region back in 2001. Bangsamoro was not implemented before Aquino’s term. Despite this, the current administration aims to establish a Federal Government, where Bangamoro will be realized into a State of the Philippines wherein Carmen will be included in Bangsamoro.

Plans to establish a new municipality in the south of Carmen so that the indigenous and Christian central and northern part of Carmen will be retained in Cotabato has yet to be confirmed. The idea arose because once the entire municipality of Carmen is included in Bangsamoro, the province of Cotabato will be cut into half, leaving three towns (Banisilan, Alamada, and Libungan) at its west without connection to the center of Cotabato, isolating these towns in the process.

== Geography ==
Libungan is located in the north-western part of the Province of Cotabato with Libungan River as the main boundary from the Municipalities of Alamada, Banisilan and Carmen.

=== Barangays ===
Libungan is politically subdivided into 20 barangays. Each barangay consists of puroks while some have sitios.

At its establishment, Libungan has 12 barangays. Libungan had 32 barangays at its peak before the municipality of Alamada was carved from Libungan.

- Abaga
- Baguer
- Barongis
- Batiocan
- Cabaruyan
- Cabpangi
- Demapaco
- Grebona
- Gumaga
- Kapayawi
- Kiloyao
- Kitubod
- Malengen
- Montay
- Nica-an
- Palao
- Poblacion
- Sinapangan
- Sinawingan
- Ulamian

=== Climate ===
Climate data for Libungan, Cotabato
Month	Jan	Feb	Mar	Apr	May	Jun	Jul	Aug	Sep	Oct	Nov	Dec	Year
Mean daily maximum °C (°F)	32 (90)	32 (90)	33 (91)	33 (91)	31 (88)	30 (86)	30 (86)	30 (86)	31 (88)	30 (86)	31 (88)	31 (88)	31 (88)
Mean daily minimum °C (°F)	22 (72)	22 (72)	22 (72)	23 (73)	24 (75)	24 (75)	23 (73)	23 (73)	23 (73)	23 (73)	23 (73)	22 (72)	23 (73)
Average precipitation mm (inches)	38 (1.5)	24 (0.9)	29 (1.1)	31 (1.2)	50 (2.0)	56 (2.2)	52 (2.0)	49 (1.9)	39 (1.5)	47 (1.9)	54 (2.1)	35 (1.4)	504 (19.7)
Average rainy days	10.1	7.5	10.0	11.5	19.7	20.8	19.4	18.5	16.3	18.5	18.4	12.8	183.5
Source: Meteoblue

Libungan's climate is under the 4th type, which is more or less even distribution of rainfall during the year.

== Demographics ==
Population census of Libungan
Year	Pop.	±% p.a.
1918	5,058	—
1970	19,029	+2.58%
1975	20,385	+1.39%
1980	22,974	+2.42%
1990	32,055	+3.39%
1995	37,202	+2.83%
2000	40,589	+1.89%
2007	43,923	+1.09%
2010	45,295	+1.13%
2015	48,768	+1.42%
2020	56,269	+3.06%
2024	57,776	+0.64%
Source: Philippine Statistics Authority

In the 2024 census, the population of Libungan was 57,776 people, with a density of 330 inhabitants per square kilometre or 850 inhabitants per square mile.

The earlier settlers of Libungan are the Manobo, Maguindanaon and Iranun. It was later settled by people from Luzon and Visayas primarily by Cebuanos from Cebu.

== Economy ==
Poverty incidence of Libungan (%)

Source: Philippine Statistics Authority

This municipality in the first congressional district of Cotabato is basically an Agricultural area. It has the basic requirements for agro-industries. It has many rice and corn mills, Buy/Sell, agri-supply supply and hardware stores. In the PALMA Alliance, Libungan has the biggest source of sand and gravel supply owing to the Libungan River bed. Libungan is also the home of the biggest poultry farm in the PALMA Alliance; it has also the Rock crusher and banana chips factory. It also has 2 filling stations, three pawnshops and a Rural Bank servicing mobility and financial requirements of local business.

=== Natural resources ===
The agricultural land in the municipality is planted with rice, corn and a hundred hectares to the traditional white corn variety. Coconut, mango and banana are also planted in the semi-sloping and upland areas.

The Gross Domestic Product of the Municipality (2022) is 8,299,700,159(PHP).

== Government ==
The first mayor of Libungan was Esmeraldo Cedeño who was appointed and served from 1961 to 1964. The first elected mayor, Pedro Singayao, Sr.—a native from Malitubog working as an agriculturist and pensionado—served from 1964 to 1967. He was succeeded by Pacifico Dela Serna who served from 1967 to 1971, who was among the early settlers from Cebu. He was followed by his wife, Lucila T. Dela Serna as the third-elected mayor.

Following the EDSA Revolution, newly installed President Corazon Aquino, appointed lawyer Nestor Q. Quintana as mayor of Libungan replacing Dela Serna. He was later replaced by Leliosa Agravante Villanueva and then later by Luden A. Laguting when Quintana ran for mayor in the 1988 election. He lost to Manuel T. dela Serna in the elections. Joel D. Humabad succeeded dela Serna when he was elected in 1992. Humabad was then succeeded by Ronaldo B. Pader after the former served for two terms. Pader served for three terms or nine years. In 2007, Manuel T. Dela Serna was elected mayor again. He is the current mayor and is on his third and last consecutive term.

== Tourism ==
In the last five years from 2014, the development of tourism in the municipality was minimal. The municipal government has eyed developing the Sapangbato River at Barangay Grebona, the waterfall at Barangay Sinapangan and the Boy & Girl Scout Camp at Barangay Demapaco as tourism sports. The waterfall at Sinapangan is the sole existing waterfall in Libungan and the BGS Camp in Demapaco was dilapidated. Tourists visiting the municipality primarily comes from adjacent municipalities and Cotabato City.

== Culture ==
Numerous festivals are held within the municipality by the Manobo people in the barangays of Barongis, Demapaco, Grebona and Sinapangan. Fiestas honoring patrons are also held in the municipality. Among these festivals are the Kaumahan Festival which features a parade and dancing contests revolving around the local endemic flora of the municipality and paraphernalia in food production. The Kaumahan festival is part of the Catholic Patronal Festival which is conducted every third Sunday of May. On December 28, annually the Samayaan Aroman Manobo Festival is celebrated where rituals by the Manobo such as Kanduli, Pamaya, Bulangan and Ulahingan are conducted.
