= Samantha Santos =

Filipino politician (born 1997)

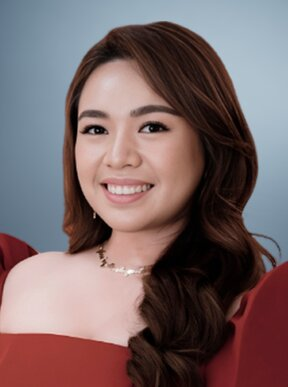
- Official portrait, 2025

Member of the Philippine House of Representatives from Cotabato's 3rd district
- Incumbent
- Assumed office June 30, 2022
- Preceded by: Jose Tejada

Personal details
- Born: Ma. Alana Samantha Taliño Santos; March 24, 1997 (age 29)
- Party: Lakas–CMD
- Parents: Alan Hidalgo Santos (father); Emmylou Taliño (mother)
- Education: University of Melbourne

Ma. Alana Samantha Taliño Santos (born March 24, 1997) is a Filipino politician serving as the representative of the Third District of Cotabato. She was first elected to the House of Representatives in 2022 and was re-elected in 2025. In the 20th Congress, she was appointed Deputy Majority Leader.

Born in Davao City, Davao del Sur, Santos comes from a political family in North Cotabato. Her mother, Emmylou "Lala" Taliño Mendoza, is the governor of Cotabato, while her stepfather, Raymond Democrito Mendoza, serves as a deputy speaker in the 20th Congress. Her biological father, Alan Hidalgo Santos, passed away during her childhood.

As a legislator, Santos has supported both local and national measures, often promoting her advocacy under the slogan Serbisyo at Malasakit.

== Education ==
Rep. Santos began her formal education at the University of the Immaculate Conception in Davao City, where she completed her primary schooling. For her secondary education, she attended Abbas Orchard Montessori School, an institution known for its emphasis on independent learning and holistic development. After finishing high school, she moved to Australia to pursue her tertiary studies. She first enrolled in the Foundation Studies program at Trinity College, University of Melbourne, a preparatory course designed for international students seeking admission to Australian universities.

Following the completion of her foundation year, Rep. Santos was admitted to the University of Melbourne, where she pursued a double major in Anthropology and Sociology. During her undergraduate years, she engaged in research and academic projects that explored cultural diversity, social systems, and community development.

Two years after earning her undergraduate degree, Rep. Santos returned to the University of Melbourne to further her studies. She completed a master’s degree in Development Studies, a multidisciplinary program focusing on social policy, international development, and sustainable community initiatives. Her postgraduate work provided her with academic grounding and analytical skills that would later inform her legislative priorities and advocacy as a public servant.

== Political career ==
Rep. Santos is the regional chairman of the Lakas–Christian Muslim Democrats (Lakas–CMD) in Cotabato, a major political party in the Philippines. Her political career began with her candidacy in the 2022 Philippine general elections for the position of Representative of the Third District of Cotabato. Running under the Lakas–CMD banner, she campaigned on a platform centered on social welfare, infrastructure development, and youth empowerment, encapsulated in her advocacy slogan Serbisyo at Malasakit.

In the 2022 elections, she won with 116,869 votes against her closest rival, Nelda Tejada of PDP–Laban, who garnered 69,654 votes. Upon assuming office in the 19th Congress, Santos was involved in the passage of both local and national measures, particularly those focused on education, livelihood programs, and rural development.

In the 2025 elections, Rep. Santos ran for re-election and was unopposed, securing a second term in the House of Representatives. In the 20th Congress, she was appointed Deputy Majority Leader.

== Electoral performance ==
=== 2025 ===
Candidate	Party	Votes	%
Samantha Santos (incumbent)	Lakas–CMD	169,867	100.00
Total		169,867	100.00
Valid votes		169,867	72.72
Invalid/blank votes		63,714	27.28
Total votes		233,581	100.00
Registered voters/turnout		274,768	85.01
Lakas–CMD hold			
Source: Commission on Elections

=== 2022 ===
2022 Philippine House of Representatives elections
Party	Candidate	Votes	%
Lakas	Samantha Santos	116,869	57.95
PDP–Laban	Nelda Tejada	69,654	34.54
Independent	Rene Roldan	15,156	7.51
Total votes		201,679	100%
Lakas gain from Nacionalista			

== Projects and voluntary organizations ==
In 2021, Santos co-founded the Municipal Advocates for Kabataan Empowerment (MAKE), a youth-focused organization serving six municipalities in the Third District of Cotabato. The initiative was inspired by the Cotabato Young Leaders Congress, a program of the Cotabato Provincial Government under the leadership of Governor Emmylou "Lala" Taliño Mendoza. MAKE was established together with former Matalam vice mayor Ralph Ryan Rafael and has since become a platform for training and mentoring young people to take on leadership roles in their communities.

During her college years, Santos was a member of the Filipino Student Council of Victoria in Melbourne, Australia.
