= Alamada =

Municipality in Cotabato, Philippines

- Municipality
- Municipality of Alamada
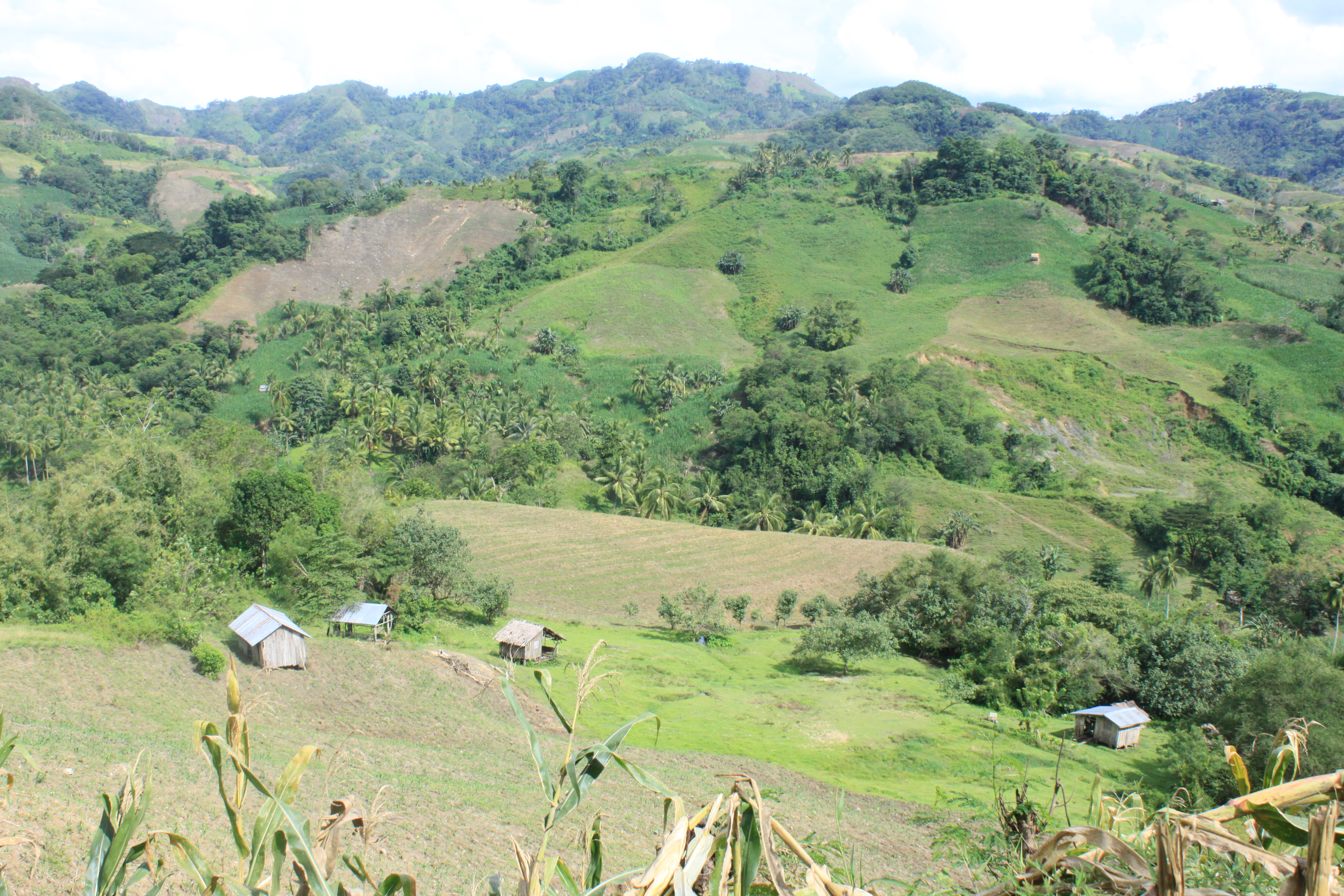
- A view of Sitio Abaga

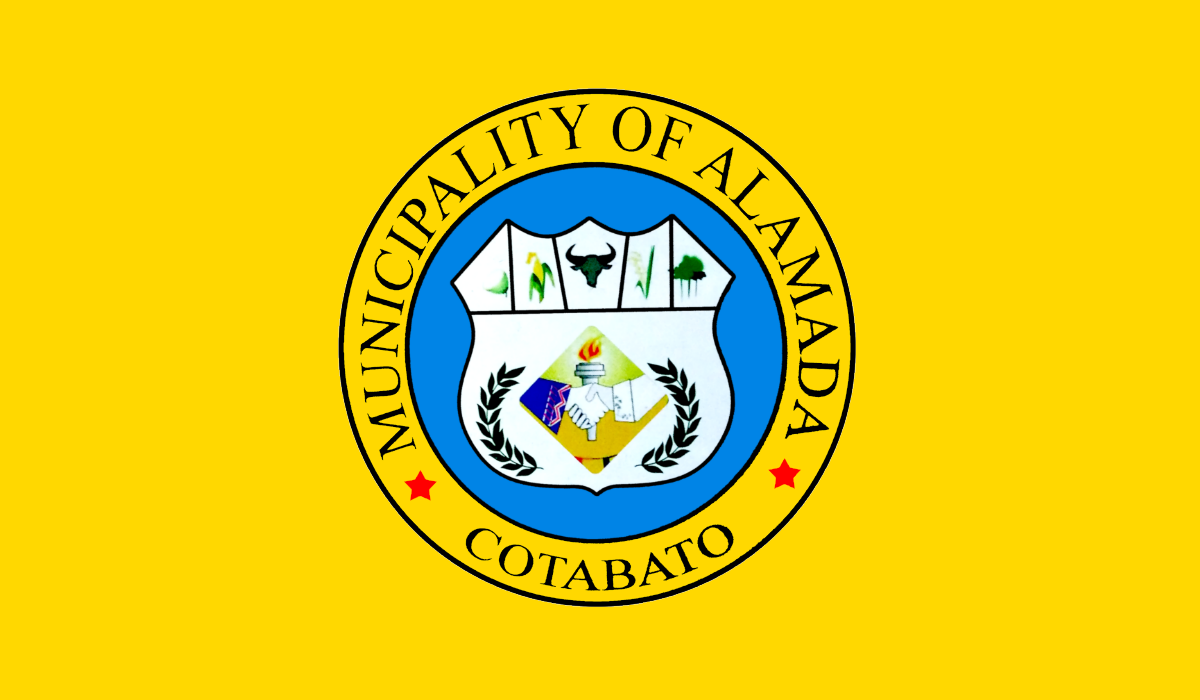
- Flag Seal

- Map of Cotabato with Alamada highlighted
- Interactive map of Alamada
- Location within the Philippines
- Coordinates: 7°23′13″N 124°33′12″E
- Country: Philippines
- Region: Soccsksargen
- Province: Cotabato
- District: 1st district
- Founded: May 20, 1969
- Barangays: 17 (see Barangays)

Government
  - Type: Sangguniang Bayan
  - Mayor: Jesus N. Sacdalan
  - Vice Mayor: Leonigildo A. Calibara Jr.
  - Representative: Joselito S. Sacdalan
  - Electorate: 43,395 voters (2025)

Area
  - Total: 787.50 km^{2} (304.06 sq mi)
- Elevation: 242 m (794 ft)
- Highest elevation: 992 m (3,255 ft)
- Lowest elevation: 70 m (230 ft)

Population (2024 census)
  - Total: 71,523
  - Density: 90.823/km^{2} (235.23/sq mi)
  - Households: 15,807

Economy
  - Income class: 1st municipal income class
  - Poverty incidence: 30.9% (2023)
  - Revenue: ₱ 428.5 million (2024)
  - Assets: ₱ 1,459 million (2024)
  - Expenditure: ₱ 397 million (2024)
  - Liabilities: ₱ 630.5 million (2024)

Service provider
  - Electricity: Cotabato Electric Cooperative (COTELCO)
- Time zone: UTC+8 (PST)
- ZIP code: 9413
- PSGC: 1204701000
- IDD : area code: +63 (0)64
- Native languages: Hiligaynon; Cebuano; Maguindanao; Iranun; Tagalog
- Website: www.alamada-cotabatoprov.gov.ph

Alamada, officially the Municipality of Alamada (Maguindanaon: Inged nu Alamada, Jawi: ايڠايد نو عالماد; Iranun: Inged a Alamada, ايڠايد ا عالماد; Hiligaynon: Banwa sang Alamada; Cebuano: Lungsod sa Alamada; Tagalog: Bayan ng Alamada), is a municipality in the province of Cotabato, Philippines. According to the 2024 census, it has a population of 71,523 people.

The town is named after the local chieftain Datu Alamada, and is famous for the Asik-Asik Falls, one of the most expansive in the Philippines.

== History ==
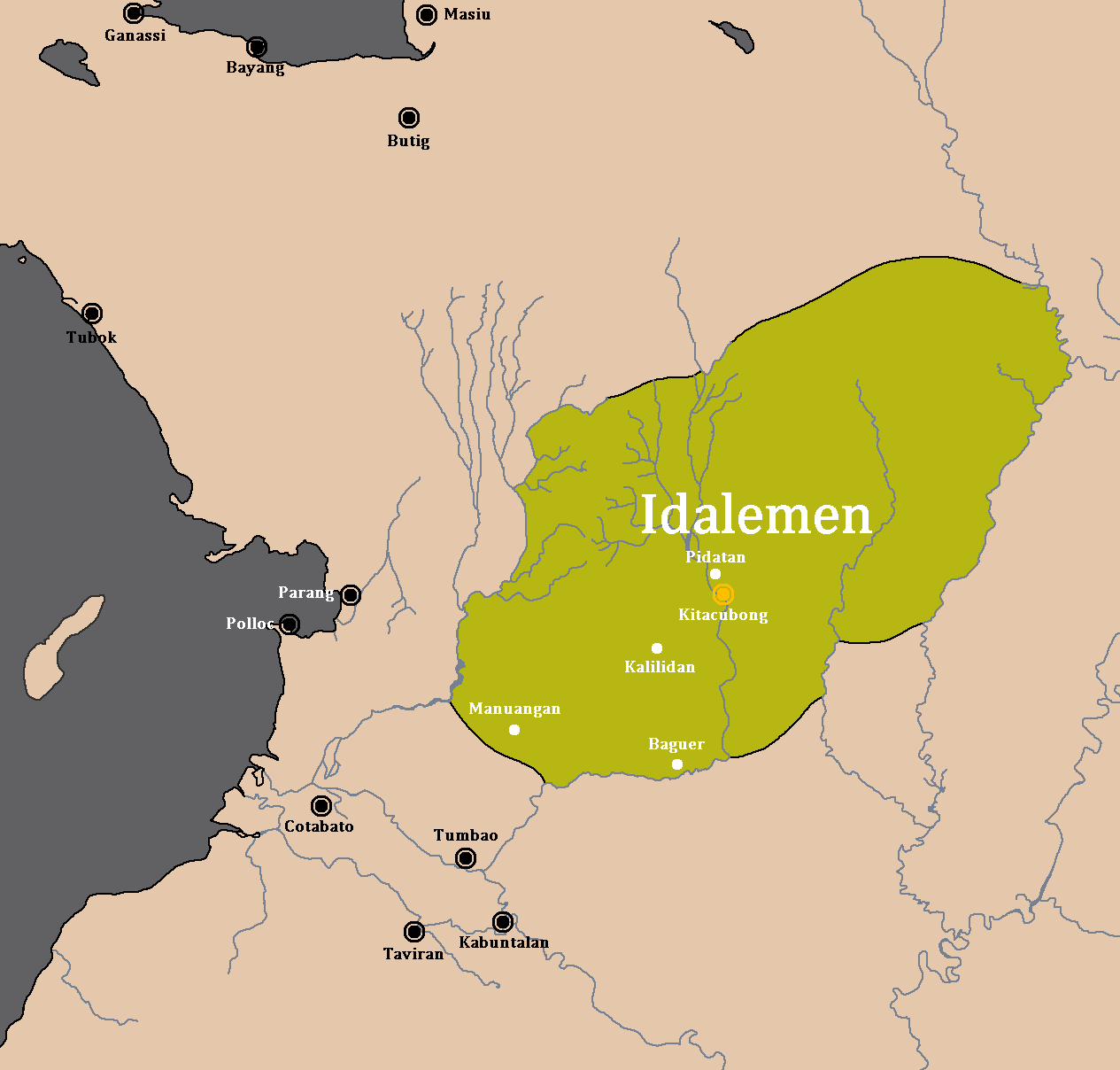
Historical map of the Idalemen Tribe (yellow) with its capital in the modern-day municipality of Alamada.

Its name was adopted in memory and in honor of the powerful ruler Datu Amaybulok Alamada. He was the leader who fought against the foreign oppression and tyranny. The Datu was recognized as one of the fiery rulers by the Iranon and the Dalaman who were scattered throughout the northern part of the Municipalities of Pigcauayan, Libungan, Sultan Kudarat and in Kitacubong (now Poblacion) as the seat of his kingdom.

Prior to its creation as a municipality, it was a resettlement area for Hukbalahap (Hukbong Bayan Laban sa Hapon) surrenders. It was also a public land as declared by then President Elpidio Quirino on March 10, 1953. It was declared as resettlement site under Proclamation No. 376. After its declaration, President Quirino designated the Armed Forces of the Philippines (AFP) to implement the “Land for the Landless Program.”

On January 1, 1954, the area was named Genio Edcor, pursuant to section 3 of General Order No. 409 GHQ., AFP; the name was in honor of then M/SGT. Regino Genio who was ambushed in 1953 at Perido Edcor Farm in Angadanan, Isabela, by the “Hukbong Magpapalaya ng Bayan”. From January 1, 1954, to August 6, 1961, Genio Edcor was a political subdivision by the Municipality of Midsayap. Samson B. Buenafe, a bona fide settler of Genio Edcor, represented the area in the Municipal Council of Midsayap.

During the nationwide reorganization in 1986, the first mayor in the name of Wenceslao Tabar Dela Cerna was brought by the EDSA revolution. President Corazon C. Aquino on her first term, replaced the incumbent leaders, especially Marcos’ supporters by the Officer-in-Charge. From March 1986 to November 1987, Jesus N. Sacdalan served as the first OIC. Mayor Wenceslao Tabar Dela Cerna was brought back in the 1988 election and served until 1992.

=== Possible isolation due to future establishment of Bangsamoro ===
During the 2001 Referendum for inclusion to the Autonomous Region in Muslim Mindanao, two (2) out of twenty-eight (28) barangays of Carmen, Cotabato chose to be part of ARMM, but were excluded because they are not connected to the main region of ARMM. During 2010–2016 Administration, the Bangsamoro ideal sprouted and a newly proposed region was in the making. According to the agreements signed by the Moro Islamic Liberation Front and the Administration of Benigno Aquino III, Carmen will be included in Bangsamoro because of the two out of twenty-eight barangays that voted in favor of joining the Muslim region back in 2001. Bangsamoro was not implemented before Aquino’s term ended. Despite this, the current administration aims to establish a Federal Government, where Bangamoro will be realized into a State of the Philippines wherein Carmen will be included in Bangsamoro.

Plans to establish a new municipality in the south of Carmen so that the indigenous and Christian central and northern part of Carmen will be retained in Cotabato has yet to be confirmed. The idea arose because once the entire municipality of Carmen is included in Bangsamoro, the province of Cotabato will be cut into half, leaving three towns (Banisilan, Alamada, and Libungan) at its west without connection to the center of Cotabato, isolating these towns in the process.

== Geography ==
The Municipality of Alamada is bounded on the north by the Province of Lanao del Sur, on the south by the Municipality of Libungan, on the east by the Municipality of Banisilan and on the west by the Municipality of Pigcawayan, and Buldon of Maguindanao del Norte. The 78,750 hectares of land area is distributed over 17 barangay. Generally, Alamada is highly elevated and its characterized by rolling, hilly and undulating terrain.

=== Barangays ===
Alamada is politically subdivided into 17 barangays. Each barangay consists of puroks while some have sitios.

- Bao
- Barangiran
- Camansi
- Dado
- Guiling
- Kitacubong (Poblacion)
- Lower Dado
- Macabasa
- Malitubog
- Mapurok
- Mirasol
- Pacao
- Paruayan
- Pigcawaran
- Polayagan
- Rangayen
- Raradangan

=== Climate ===
Climate data for Alamada, Cotabato
Month	Jan	Feb	Mar	Apr	May	Jun	Jul	Aug	Sep	Oct	Nov	Dec	Year
Mean daily maximum °C (°F)	31 (88)	32 (90)	32 (90)	32 (90)	31 (88)	30 (86)	30 (86)	30 (86)	30 (86)	30 (86)	30 (86)	31 (88)	31 (88)
Mean daily minimum °C (°F)	21 (70)	21 (70)	21 (70)	23 (73)	23 (73)	23 (73)	23 (73)	23 (73)	23 (73)	23 (73)	23 (73)	22 (72)	22 (72)
Average precipitation mm (inches)	38 (1.5)	24 (0.9)	29 (1.1)	31 (1.2)	50 (2.0)	56 (2.2)	52 (2.0)	49 (1.9)	39 (1.5)	47 (1.9)	54 (2.1)	35 (1.4)	504 (19.7)
Average rainy days	10.1	7.5	10.0	11.5	19.7	20.8	19.4	18.5	16.3	18.5	18.4	12.8	183.5
Source: Meteoblue

The municipality belongs to the fourth type of climate. Rainfall is evenly throughout the year except on the months of May and September. Rainfall ranges from 73.63 to 96.88 inches (1,870 to 2,461 mm).

== Demographics ==
Population census of Alamada
Year	Pop.	±% p.a.
1970	14,813	—
1975	16,679	+2.41%
1980	20,205	+3.91%
1990	33,688	+5.25%
1995	38,949	+2.76%
2000	44,303	+2.80%
2007	52,165	+2.28%
2010	56,813	+3.15%
2015	64,596	+2.48%
2020	68,659	+1.29%
2024	71,523	+0.99%
Source: Philippine Statistics Authority

In the 2024 census, the population of Alamada was 71,523 people, with a density of 91 inhabitants per square kilometre or 240 inhabitants per square mile.

== Economy ==
Poverty incidence of Alamada

Source: Philippine Statistics Authority

Alamada is basically agricultural as its land is cultivated for corn, upland rice, bananas, palm oil, and rubber. Thus its people activities are devoted to agriculture. A corn producing municipality. Livestock and poultry production is also another agricultural activities.

=== Natural resources ===
Its agricultural products are corn, coconuts, rice, banana, carrots, Yukon Gold potato, mango and other crops, minerals are also found in the areas such as manganese.

The Gross Domestic Product of the Municipality (2022) is 14,145,601,066 (PHP).

== Tourism ==
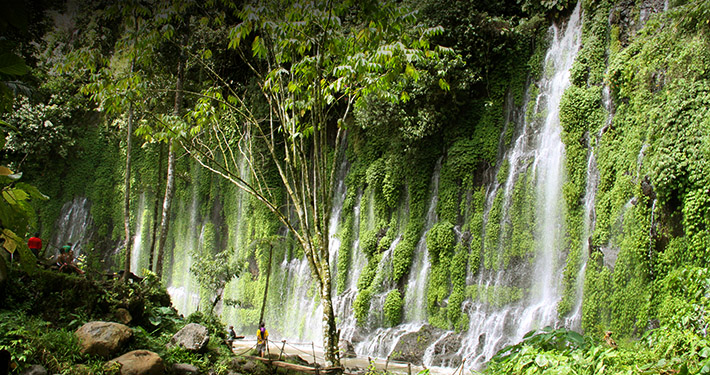
Asik-asik Falls in Upper Dado

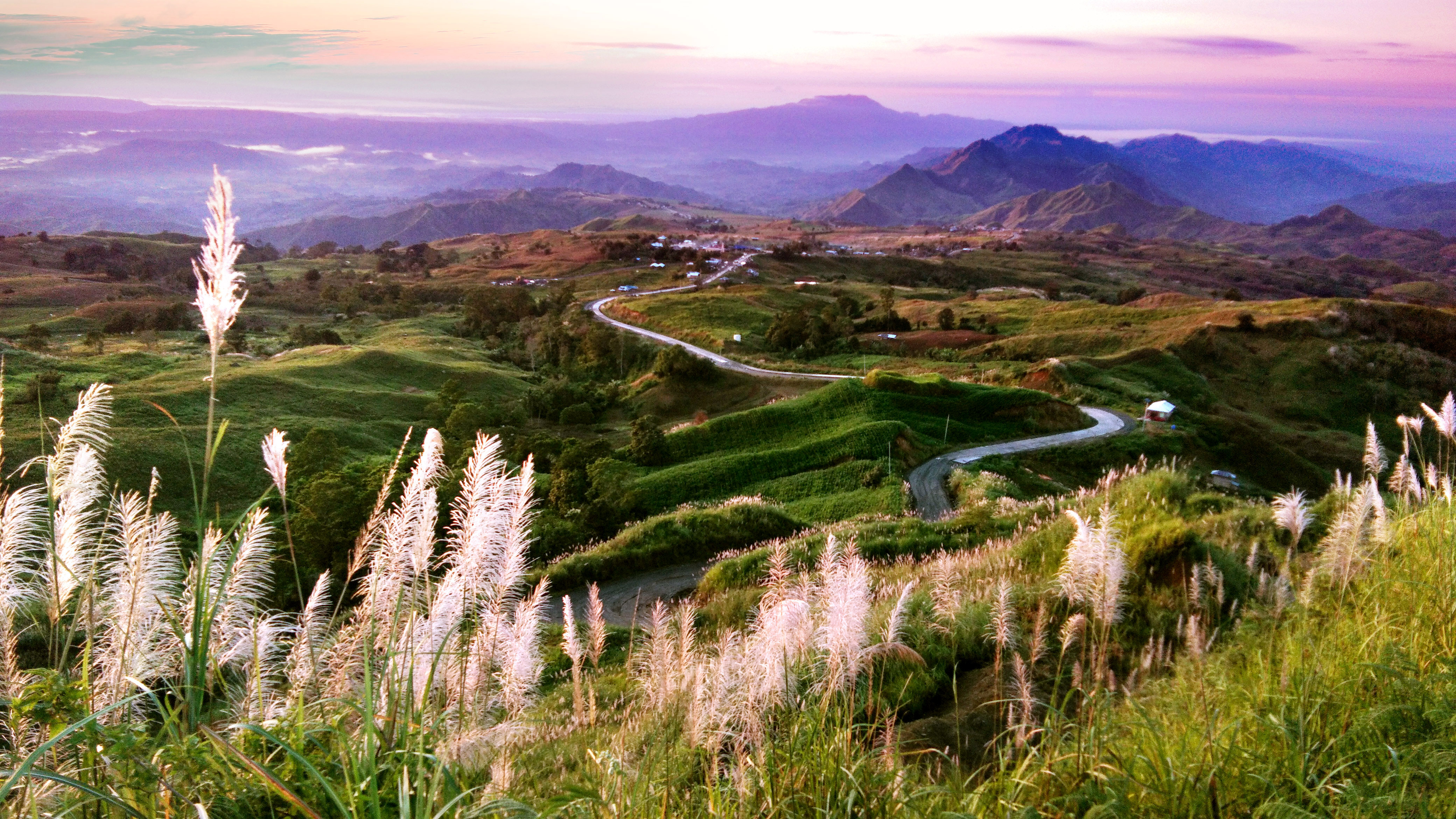
Guo Hill View Deck

- Asik-Asik Falls is located at Sitio Dulao, Upper Dado, Alamada, Cotabato. The water comes from the rocks, instead of a stream.
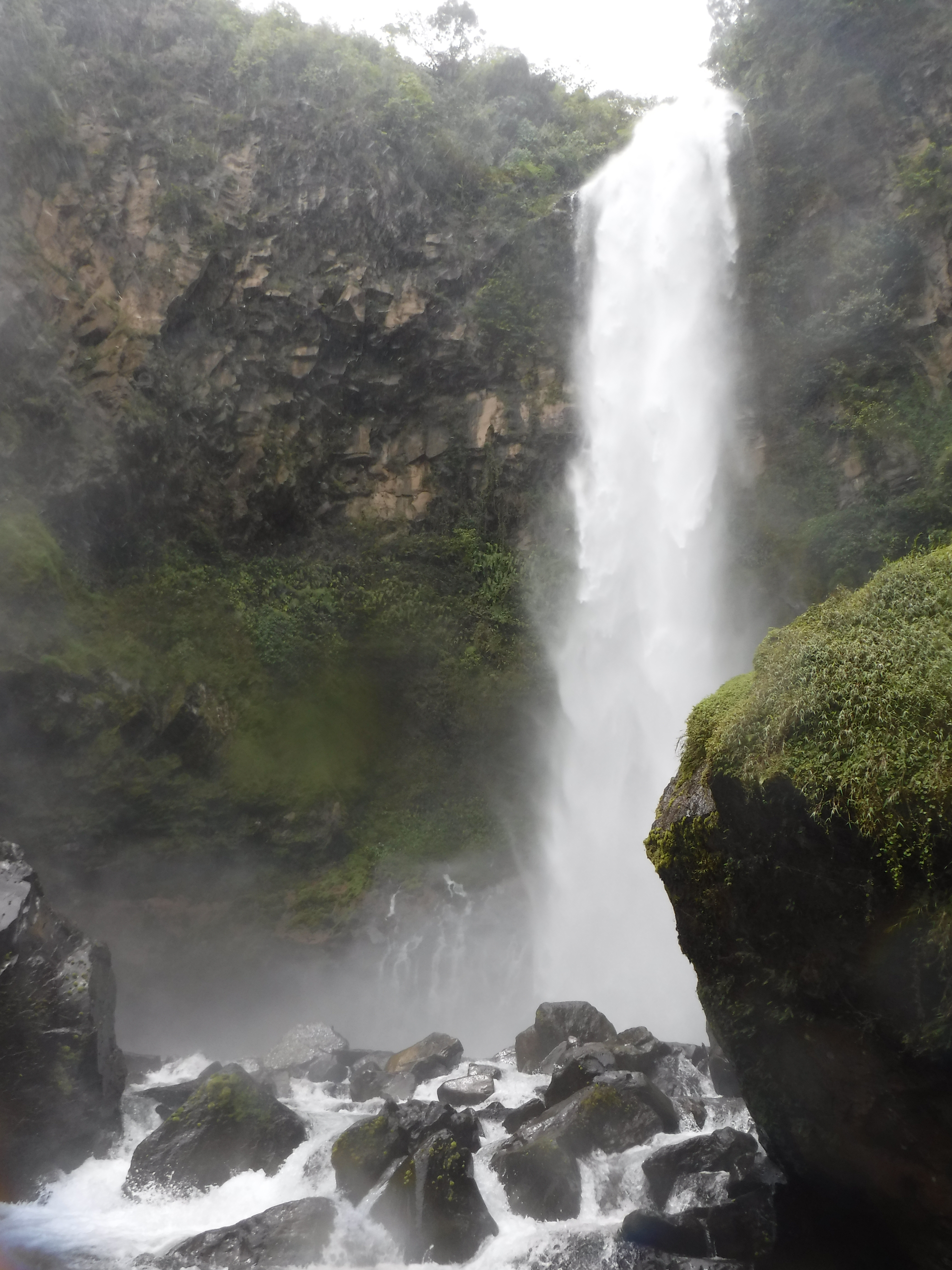
- Daday Falls in Upper Dado
  Daday Falls, Upper Dado, Alamada, Cotabato. This is the highest and biggest waterfalls in the municipality, and it is located just few kilometers from the Asik-asik falls.
- Guo Hill View Deck is located between Barangay Rangayen and Barangay Guiling.
- Kitub-Bao Cave located at Kitub-Bao, Alamada. It has one entrance but 3 exit points, underground water, swallow birds, bats and other unknown insects could be found inside the cave.
- Mt. Opao located at Kitub-Bao, Alamada, specifically between the boundaries of Alamada and Banisilan. It is blessed with natural grown trees and source of cold spring water.
- Shrine of the Holy Cross of Siya-siya located at Siya-siya, Bao, Alamada.
