= Cotabato's 3rd congressional district =

Legislative district of the Philippines

- Constituency for the House of Representatives of the Philippines
- Location of Cotabato within the Philippines
- Province: Cotabato
- Region: Soccsksargen
- Population: 459,703 (2015)
- Electorate: 253,883 (2019)
- Major settlements: 6 LGUs: Municipalities; Banisilan; Carmen; Kabacan; M'lang; Matalam; Tulunan
- Area: 3,266.95 km^{2} (1,261.38 sq mi)

Current constituency
- Created: 2012
- Representative: Samantha Santos
- Political party: Lakas-CMD
- Congressional bloc: Majority

Cotabato's 3rd congressional district is one of the three congressional districts of the Philippines in the province of Cotabato. It has been represented in the House of Representatives since 2013. The district covers central and southern Cotabato bordering Maguindanao to the west and Lanao del Sur to the north. It consists of the municipalities of Banisilan, Carmen, Kabacan, M'lang, Matalam and Tulunan. The district contains several exclaves of the Bangsamoro autonomous region. It is currently represented in the 20th Congress by Samantha Santos of the Lakas-CMD.

== Representation history ==
#	Image	Member	Term of office		Congress	Party	Electoral history	Constituent LGUs
#	Image	Member	Start	End	Congress	Party	Electoral history	Constituent LGUs
=== Cotabato's 3rd district for the House of Representatives of the Philippines ===
District created September 14, 2012.
1		Jose Tejada	June 30, 2013	June 30, 2022	16th	Nacionalista	Elected in 2013.	2013–present Banisilan, Carmen, Kabacan, M'lang, Matalam, Tulunan
1		Jose Tejada	June 30, 2013	June 30, 2022	17th	Nacionalista	Re-elected in 2016.	2013–present Banisilan, Carmen, Kabacan, M'lang, Matalam, Tulunan
1		Jose Tejada	June 30, 2013	June 30, 2022	18th	Nacionalista	Re-elected in 2019.	2013–present Banisilan, Carmen, Kabacan, M'lang, Matalam, Tulunan
2		Samantha Santos	June 30, 2022	Incumbent	19th	Lakas	Elected in 2022.	2013–present Banisilan, Carmen, Kabacan, M'lang, Matalam, Tulunan
2		Samantha Santos	June 30, 2022	Incumbent	20th	Lakas	Re-elected in 2025.	2013–present Banisilan, Carmen, Kabacan, M'lang, Matalam, Tulunan

== Election results ==
=== 2025 ===
Candidate	Party	Votes	%
Samantha Santos (incumbent)	Lakas–CMD	169,867	100.00
Total		169,867	100.00
Valid votes		169,867	72.72
Invalid/blank votes		63,714	27.28
Total votes		233,581	100.00
Registered voters/turnout		274,768	85.01
Lakas–CMD hold			
Source: Commission on Elections

=== 2022 ===
2022 Philippine House of Representatives elections
Party	Candidate	Votes	%
Lakas	Samantha Santos	116,869	57.95
PDP–Laban	Nelda Tejada	69,654	34.54
Independent	Rene Roldan	15,156	7.51
Total votes		201,679	100%
Lakas gain from Nacionalista			

== See also ==
- Legislative districts of Cotabato
