= Libungan River =

River in Cotabato, Philippines

Libungan River Gribuna River
- Location within Mindanao mainland Location within Philippines

Location
- Country: Philippines
- Region: Soccsksargen
- Province: Cotabato

Physical characteristics
- Source: Mount Piapayungan
  - location: Barangay Dado, Alamada, Cotabato
- Mouth: Rio Grande de Mindanao
  - location: Libungan Marsh
  - coordinates: 7°12′23″N 124°26′00″E
- Basin size: 509 km^{2} (197 sq mi)
- Discharge
  - location: Grebona, Libungan, Cotabato 7°14′38″N 124°32′45″E
  - average: 11,242 L/s (148,370 imp gal/min)
  - minimum: 7,470 L/s (98,600 imp gal/min)
  - maximum: 102,500 L/s (1,353,000 imp gal/min)

Basin features
- Progression: Libungan–Libungan Marsh–Mindanao
- Waterfalls: Asik-Asik Falls

The Libungan River is a river on Mindanao island in the Philippines. It springs on the slopes of Mount Piapayungan and flows south through the town of Alamada, Cotabato. At the town of Libungan, Cotabato, the river turns south-west and forms the boundary between the provinces of Cotabato and Maguindanao del Norte until it drains into the Rio Grande de Mindanao at the Libungan Marsh.

Tributaries include the Alamada River.

The name comes from the term Limbungan, meaning "cheater", which referred to the frequent changes in the river's course that would damage the crops and thereby cheat the farmers out of their harvest.

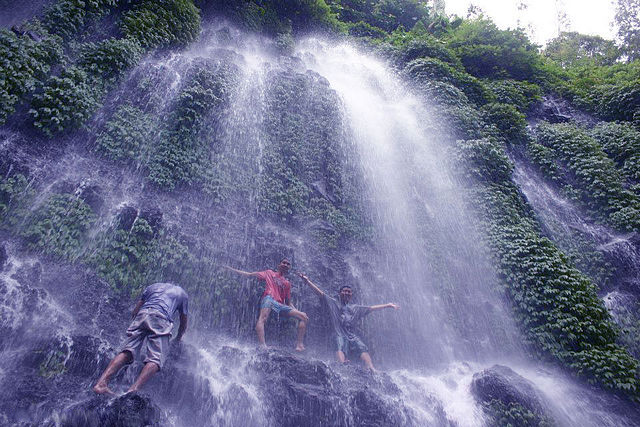
Asik-Asik Falls of the Libungan River in Alamada, Cotabato
