= Edwin Cruzado =

Filipino physician and politician

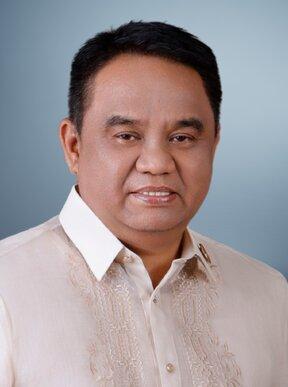
- Official portrait, 2025

Member of the Philippine House of Representatives from Cotabato's 1st congressional district
- Incumbent
- Assumed office June 30, 2025
- Preceded by: Joselito Sacdalan

Member of the Cotabato Provincial Board from the 1st district
- In office June 30, 2022 – June 30, 2025

Personal details
- Born: Edwin Ledesma Cruzado; May 19, 1962 (age 64) Cotabato, Philippines
- Party: Lakas (2025–present)
- Other political affiliations: PMP (2024–2025); PDP (2021–2024)
- Spouse: Isabelita A. Cruzado
- Occupation: Physician, Politician

Edwin Ledesma Cruzado (born May 19, 1962) is a Filipino physician and politician serving as the representative of Cotabato's 1st congressional district since 2025. A former board member of North Cotabato's 1st District, he is affiliated with Lakas–CMD.

== Early life and career ==
Cruzado was trained as a physician and served as a health officer in Cotabato province. In 2002, he narrowly escaped an abduction attempt by the Pentagon gang, an incident that underscored his commitment to public service despite security risks.

== Political career ==
Cruzado entered politics as a board member for North Cotabato's 1st District. In the 2025 elections, he ran under the Pwersa ng Masang Pilipino and defeated incumbent representative Joselito Sacdalan for the congressional seat.

On June 4, 2025, Cruzado formally joined Lakas–CMD, with Speaker Ferdinand Martin Romualdez administering his oath of membership at the House of Representatives.

== Personal life ==
Cruzado is married to Isabelita A. Cruzado.

== See also ==
- 20th Congress of the Philippines
