= Sanggacala Matalam Baraguir =

Filipino politician

Datu Sanggacala Matalam Baraguir

Governor of Maguindanao

Datu, Mayor of Sultan Kudarat, Governor of Maguindanao
- In office 1977–1980
- Preceded by: Zacaria A. Candao
- Succeeded by: Sandiale A. Sambolawan

Mayor of Sultan Kudarat
- In office 1956–1971

Personal details
- Occupation: Politician, Traditional leader

Datu Sanggacala Matalam Baraguir is a political and traditional leader from the province of Maguindanao in the Philippines. He played a role in the history of local government in central Mindanao during the mid-to-late 20th century, serving as mayor of the municipality of Sultan Kudarat (formerly known as Nuling), and later as the governor of Maguindanao province in the 1970s. His career reflects the integration of traditional authority (belonging to the Moro people and the Sultanate of Maguindanao) and modern local government institutions.

== Local government career ==
List of officials and employees of the municipality of Sultan Kudarat (1970–1971) showing the name of Datu Sanggacala as Mayor.

Sanggacala Baraguir served in the municipal government before ascending to the governorship.

- Accounts indicate that he served as the mayor of the municipality of Nuling between 1956 and 1971.
- The renaming of the municipality from Nuling to Sultan Kudarat, which became one of the prominent municipalities in the province, occurred during his leadership period.
- His tenure coincided with demographic, economic, and political shifts across parts of Mindanao, as he operated as a Datu (traditional leader) within the formal administrative structure.

== Governor of Maguindanao ==
In the 1970s, following the division of the greater Cotabato province, the new province of Maguindanao was formed.

- Datu Sanggacala Baraguir was appointed as the governor of Maguindanao by President Ferdinand Marcos in 1977, and he remained in office until 1980.
- He ranks among the first governors of the province in the following sequence: Simeon A. Datumanong (1973–1975), followed by Zacaria A. Candao (1975–1977), then Datu Sanggacala M. Baraguir (1977–1980), and succeeded by Sandiale A. Sambolawan (1980–1986).
- His administration of the province coincided with the implementation of martial law, a period characterized by the centralization of government power and armed conflicts in Mindanao.

== Associates in local government ==
Datu Sanggacala Matalam Baraguir (second from right) in a meeting with several local leaders and politicians in the region.

During his tenure as mayor, Datu Sanggacala was associated with local officials in the administration of the Sultan Kudarat municipality, including:

- Datu Mamur Matabalaw, who served as Vice Mayor.
- Datu Batuling Bantayao Gumander, who assumed office in the late 1960s. Accounts state that when Sanggacala was appointed governor in 1977, he offered Gumander the opportunity to succeed him as mayor, but the latter declined the position and later engaged in the growing armed struggle of the Moro people.
- The name of Datu Tucao Mastura was linked to the subsequent leadership of the municipality.

== See also ==
- Maguindanao
- Batuling Bantayao Gumander
- Ferdinand Marcos
- Sultanate of Maguindanao
- Tucao Mastura
