= Bungabong, Sultan Mastura =

Bungabong Bongabong
- Seal
- Interactive map of Bungabong
- Coordinates: 7.2992°N 124.3209°E
- Country: Philippines
- Region: Bangsamoro
- Province: Maguindanao del Norte
- Municipality: Sultan Mastura
- Elevation: 64.3 m (211 ft)

Population (2020)
  - Total: 1,284

Bungabong (also spelled as Bongabong) is a barangay in the municipality of Sultan Mastura, in the province of Maguindanao del Norte, Philippines. As determined by the 2020 Census, its population was 1,284, which represented 5.07% of the total population of Sultan Mastura.

Barangay Hall of Bungabong 2021

== Geography ==
Bungabong is situated on the island of Mindanao at approximately 7.2992 latitude and 124.3209 longitude. The elevation at these coordinates is estimated at 64.3 meters, or 211.0 feet, above mean sea level. The barangay lies within the Mindanao River Basin, which ultimately discharges into Illana Bay.

Several landmarks are located within a 25-kilometer radius of Bungabong. These include the Rio Grande de Mindanao to the south-south-west, the Libungan River to the south-east, and Timako Hill to the west-south-west. Additionally, Gardoqui Point and Mount Akir Akir are situated nearby.

== Demographics ==
The population of Bungabong grew from 509 in 1990 to 1,284 in 2020, representing an increase of 775 people over the course of 30 years. The 2020 census figures denote a positive annualized growth rate of 2.03% from the previous population of 1,167 in 2015. The barangay represents 0.0292% of the Bangsamoro Autonomous Region in Muslim Mindanao's total population and 0.0012% of the national population of the Philippines.

According to the 2015 Census, the household population was 1,167, divided into 200 households with an average of 5.84 members per household. The age group with the highest population is 15 to 19 years old, while the lowest is 80 and over. The population is divided into three key groups:

- Young dependents (14 and below) account for 35.05% of the total population.
- The economically active population (15 to 64) comprises 62.38%.
- Senior citizens (65 and over) represent 2.57%.

This structure results in an age dependency ratio of 60 dependents for every 100 working-age individuals, and the median age of the barangay is 20.

== Economy ==
Based on the Bureau of Internal Revenue (BIR) zonal values for 2026, street-level residential values in Bungabong range from ₱249 to ₱297 per square meter, with a median of ₱273 per square meter. Commercial zonal values can reach up to ₱495 per square meter, while industrial values are set at ₱447 per square meter. Agricultural lands are classified with zonal values ranging between ₱4, ₱20, and ₱22 per square meter.
