= Simuay River =

River in Lanao del Sur, Philippines

Coordinates: 7°16′N 124°14′E

- Location within Mindanao mainland Location within Philippines

Location
- Country: Philippines
- Region: Maguindanao del Norte, Bangsamoro Autonomous Region

Physical characteristics
- Source: Piapayungan Range
  - location: Mount Ragang
  - elevation: 9,236 ft (2,815 m)
- Length: 81 km (50 mi)
- Basin size: 627 km^{2} (242 sq mi)

The Simuay River is a river in the Philippines with its source at Lanao del Sur in the Piapayungan range, and its mouth at is at Illana Bay through the Mindanao River.

The river is prone to flash floods.
