= Banisilan =

Municipality in Cotabato, Philippines

- Municipality
- Municipality of Banisilan
- Seal

- Map of Cotabato with Banisilan highlighted
- Interactive map of Banisilan
- Location within the Philippines
- Coordinates: 7°30′22″N 124°41′41″E
- Country: Philippines
- Region: Soccsksargen
- Province: Cotabato
- District: 3rd district
- Founded: February 8, 1982
- Barangays: 20 (see Barangays)

Government
  - Type: Sangguniang Bayan
  - Mayor: Jesus F. Alisasis
  - Vice Mayor: Julier D. Caranay
  - Representative: Jose I. Tejada
  - Electorate: 29,033 voters (2025)

Area
  - Total: 577.22 km^{2} (222.87 sq mi)
- Elevation: 394 m (1,293 ft)
- Highest elevation: 599 m (1,965 ft)
- Lowest elevation: 233 m (764 ft)

Population (2024 census)
  - Total: 48,013
  - Density: 83.180/km^{2} (215.43/sq mi)
  - Households: 10,646

Economy
  - Income class: 1st municipal income class
  - Poverty incidence: 29.59% (2023)
  - Revenue: ₱ 300.5 million (2024)
  - Assets: ₱ 571.9 million (2024)
  - Expenditure: ₱ 165 million (2024)
  - Liabilities: ₱ 307.8 million (2024)

Service provider
  - Electricity: Cotabato Electric Cooperative (COTELCO)
- Time zone: UTC+8 (PST)
- ZIP code: 9416
- PSGC: 1204716000
- IDD : area code: +63 (0)64
- Native languages: Hiligaynon; Cebuano; Western Bukidnon Manobo; Iranun; Tagalog; Maguindanaon
- Website: www.banisilan-cotabatoprov.gov.ph

Banisilan, officially the Municipality of Banisilan (Maguindanaon: Inged nu Banisilan, Jawi: ايڠايد نو بنيسيلن; Iranun: Inged a Banisilan, ايڠايد ا بنيسيلن; Hiligaynon: Banwa sang Banisilan; Cebuano: Lungsod sa Banisilan; Tagalog: Bayan ng Banisilan), is a municipality in the province of Cotabato, Philippines. According to the 2024 census, it has a population of 48,013 people.

== History ==
Banisilan accidentally acquired its name from a type of fresh water shell called the Banisil which were then abundant in the area.

Before Banisilan was created as a separate municipality from Carmen, its mother town, President Ramon Magsaysay signed Proclamation No. 317 dated July 17, 1956 reserving an area of 100,018 hectares of land for a resettlement project which was under the general administration (NARRA) now known as the Department of Agrarian Reform. This resettlement project covers three (3) municipalities and part of these is the North Cotabato Resettlement Project No. 1. As years passed, hundreds of landless and qualified citizens coming from almost all parts of the country were resettled in the area. On March 19, 1959, the first batch of settlers from Panay called SAKADA, headed by Jesus T. Alisasis who become the first Vice Mayor, set foot in Banisilan and in the succeeding months, other tribes from Luzon followed.

On February 8, 1982, Batas Pambansa Blg. 141 was approved; twelve barangays in Carmen were separated to create Banisilan, with one with the same name designated the seat of government. A plebiscite for ratification, along with ten more newly created local entities including nearby Aleosan, was held on May 17, coinciding with the barangay elections.

=== Possible isolation due to future establishment of Bangsamoro ===
During the 2001 Referendum for inclusion to the Autonomous Region in Muslim Mindanao, two (2) out of twenty-eight (28) barangays of Carmen, Cotabato chose to be part of ARMM, but were excluded because they are not connected to the main region of ARMM. During 2010-2016 Administration, the Bangsamoro ideal sprouted and a newly proposed region was in the making. According to the agreements signed by the Moro Islamic Liberation Front and the Administration of Noynoy Aquino, Carmen will be included in Bangsamoro because of the two out of twenty-eight barangays that voted in favor of joining the Muslim region back in 2001. Unfortunately, Bangsamoro was not implemented before the term of Aquino ended. Despite this, the current administration aims to establish a Federal Government, where Bangamoro will be realized into a State of the Philippines wherein Carmen will be included in Bangsamoro.

Plans to establish a new municipality in the south of Carmen so that the indigenous and Christian central and northern part of Carmen will be retained in Cotabato has yet to be confirmed. The idea arose because once the entire municipality of Carmen is included in Bangsamoro, the province of Cotabato will be cut into half, leaving three towns (Banisilan, Alamada, and Libungan) at its west without connection to the center of Cotabato, isolating these towns in the process.

== Geography ==
Located at the northern quadrant of Cotabato Province bounded on the north by the Municipality of Wao, Lanao del Sur, on the east to north-east by the Municipality of Carmen and Bukidnon province, and on the west by Municipality of Alamada.

=== Barangays ===
Banisilan is politically subdivided into 20 barangays. Each barangay consists of puroks while some have sitios.

- Busaon
- Capayangan
- Carugmanan
- Gastav
- Kalawaig
- Kiaring
- Malagap
- Malinao
- Miguel Macasarte
- Pantar
- Paradise
- Pinamulaan
- Poblacion I
- Poblacion II
- Puting-bato
- Salama
- Thailand
- Tinimbacan
- Tumbao-Camalig
- Wadya

=== Climate ===
Climate data for Banisilan, Cotabato
Month	Jan	Feb	Mar	Apr	May	Jun	Jul	Aug	Sep	Oct	Nov	Dec	Year
Mean daily maximum °C (°F)	29 (84)	30 (86)	30 (86)	30 (86)	29 (84)	28 (82)	28 (82)	28 (82)	28 (82)	28 (82)	28 (82)	29 (84)	29 (84)
Mean daily minimum °C (°F)	19 (66)	19 (66)	19 (66)	21 (70)	21 (70)	21 (70)	21 (70)	21 (70)	21 (70)	21 (70)	21 (70)	20 (68)	20 (69)
Average precipitation mm (inches)	38 (1.5)	24 (0.9)	29 (1.1)	31 (1.2)	50 (2.0)	56 (2.2)	52 (2.0)	49 (1.9)	39 (1.5)	47 (1.9)	54 (2.1)	35 (1.4)	504 (19.7)
Average rainy days	10.1	7.5	10.0	11.5	19.7	20.8	19.4	18.5	16.3	18.5	18.4	12.8	183.5
Source: Meteoblue

Banisilan has wet and dry seasons, a general characteristic of the Philippine climate.

== Demographics ==
Population census of Banisilan
Year	Pop.	±% p.a.
1990	26,576	—
1995	29,352	+1.88%
2000	35,539	+4.19%
2007	36,567	+0.39%
2010	39,914	+3.24%
2015	43,677	+1.73%
2020	46,995	+1.55%
2024	48,013	+0.52%
Source: Philippine Statistics Authority

In the 2024 census, the population of Banisilan was 48,013 people, with a density of 83 inhabitants per square kilometre or 210 inhabitants per square mile.

== Economy ==
Poverty incidence of Banisilan

Source: Philippine Statistics Authority

A large agricultural area is devoted to agri-production, producing resources like corn, palay, rubber, sugar cane and fruit trees.

== Tourism ==
- Mount Opao - This mountain is located between the boundaries of Banisilan and Alamada. It has natural grown trees and a cold spring.
