= Cotabato Provincial Board =

Legislative body of the province of Cotabato, Philippines

Cotabato Provincial Board Sangguniang Panlalawigan ng

Type
- Type: Unicameral
- Term limits: 3 terms (9 years)

Leadership
- Presiding Officer: Rochella Marie T. Taray, Lakas-CMD since June 30, 2025

Structure
- Seats: 14 board members 1 ex officio presiding officer
- Political groups: PDP–Laban (8) Nacionalista (3) Nonpartisan (3)
- Length of term: 3 years
- Authority: Local Government Code of the Philippines

Elections
- Voting system: Multiple non-transferable vote (regular members); Indirect election (ex officio members); Acclamation (sectoral member)
- Last election: May 13, 2019
- Next election: May 9, 2022

Meeting place
- Cotabato Provincial Capitol, Kidapawan

The Cotabato Provincial Board is the Sangguniang Panlalawigan (provincial legislature) of the Philippine province of Cotabato, also known as "North Cotabato".

The members are elected via plurality-at-large voting: the province is divided into three districts, the first district sending four members, and the second and third sending three members each to the provincial board; the number of candidates the electorate votes for and the number of winning candidates depends on the number of members their district sends. The vice governor is the ex officio presiding officer, and only votes to break ties. The vice governor is elected via the plurality voting system province-wide.

The districts used in appropriation of members is coextensive with the legislative districts of Cotabato.

Aside from the regular members, the board also includes the provincial federation presidents of the Liga ng mga Barangay (ABC, from its old name "Association of Barangay Captains"), the Sangguniang Kabataan (SK, youth councils) and the Philippine Councilors League (PCL). Cotabato's provincial board also has a reserved seat for its indigenous people (IPMR).

== Apportionment ==
Elections	Seats per district			Ex officio seats	Reserved seats	Total seats
Elections	1st	2nd	3rd	Ex officio seats	Reserved seats	Total seats
2010–2013	5	5	—	3	—	13
2013–2018	4	3	3	3	—	13
2018–present	4	3	3	3	1	14

== List of members ==
=== Current members ===
These are the members after the 2025 local elections and 2023 barangay and SK elections

- Vice Governor: Rochella Marie T. Taray (Lakas-CMD)

Seat	Board member	Party	Start of term	End of term
1st district	Shirlyn D. Macarsarte	Lakas	June 30, 2019	June 30, 2028
1st district	Sittie Eljorie C. Antao	Nacionalista	June 30, 2025	June 30, 2028
1st district	Rosalie H. Cabaya	Lakas	June 30, 2025	June 30, 2028
1st district	Roland D. Jungco	Nacionalista	June 30, 2019	June 30, 2028
2nd district	Ryl John C. Caoagdan	Nacionalista	June 30, 2022	June 30, 2028
2nd district	Joseph A. Evangelista	NPC	June 30, 2022	June 30, 2028
2nd district	Ma. Krista P. Solis	KNP	June 30, 2019	June 30, 2028
3rd district	Joemar S. Cerebo	Lakas	June 30, 2019	June 30, 2028
3rd district	Ivy Martia Lei C. Dalumpines	Lakas	June 30, 2019	June 30, 2028
3rd district	Reyman L. Saldivar	Independent	June 30, 2025	June 30, 2028
ABC	Dulia Sultan	Nonpartisan	July 30, 2018	January 1, 2023
PCL	Alberto Rivera	Nacionalista	July 1, 2019	June 30, 2022
SK	Sarah Simblante	Nonpartisan	June 8, 2018	January 1, 2023
IPMR	Jaime Odo	Nonpartisan		

=== Vice Governor ===
Election year	Name	Party	Ref.
2016	Greg Ipong	Independent	
2019	Emmylou Mendoza	Nacionalista	
2022	Efren F. Piñol	Lakas	
2025	Rochella Marie T. Taray	Nacionalista	

=== 1st District ===
- Population (2024):

Election year	Member (party)	Member (party)	Member (party)	Member (party)	Ref.
2016	Shirlyn D. Macasarte (Independent)	Rolando C. Sacdalan (Independent)	Mohammad Kelie U. Antao (Liberal)	Rosalie H. Cabaya (Liberal)	
2019	Shirlyn D. Macasarte (Nacionalista)	Roland D. Jungco (Nacionalista)	Mohammad Kelie U. Antao (Nacionalista)	Rosalie H. Cabaya (Nacionalista)	
2022	Edwin L. Cruzado (PDP–Laban)	Roland D. Jungco (Nacionalista)	Manuel Rabara (PDP–Laban)	Sitie Eljorie C. Antao (Nacionalista)	
2025	Shirlyn D. Macasarte (Lakas)	Roland D. Jungco (Nacionalista)	Rosalie H. Cabaya (Lakas)	Sitie Eljorie C. Antao (Nacionalista)	

=== 2nd District ===
- Population (2024):

Election year	Member (party)	Member (party)	Member (party)	Ref.
2016	Cris Candugon (Independent)	Noel Baynosa (Independent)	Dina Espina-Chua (Independent)	
2019	Ma. Crista Piñol (PDP–Laban)	Philbert G. Malaluan (PDP–Laban)	Onofre L. Respicio (PDP–Laban)	
2022	Ma. Crista Piñol-Solis (PDP–Laban)	Joseph A. Evangelista (Nacionalista)	Ryl John C. Caoagdan (Nacionalista)	
2025	Ma. Crista Piñol-Solis (KANP)	Joseph A. Evangelista (NPC)	Ryl John C. Caoagdan (Nacionalista)	

=== 3rd District ===
- Population (2024):

Election year	Member (party)	Member (party)	Member (party)	Ref.
2016	Roger Ryan Taliño (Liberal)	Jonathan M. Tabara (Liberal)	Socrates Piñol (PDP–Laban)	
2019	Ivy Marta Lei Dalumpines (Nacionalista)	Jonathan M. Tabara (Nacionalista)	Joemar S. Cerebo (Nacionalista)	
2022	Ivy Marta Lei Dalumpines (Nacionalista)	Jonathan M. Tabara (Lakas)	Jomar S. Cerebo (Lakas)	
2025	Ivy Marta Lei Dalumpines (Lakas)	Reyman L. Saldivar (Independent)	Jomar S. Cerebo (Lakas)	
