= Rio Grande de Mindanao =

Largest river system in Mindanao

Rio Grande de Mindanao: Mindanao River; Tamontaka River; Cotabato River
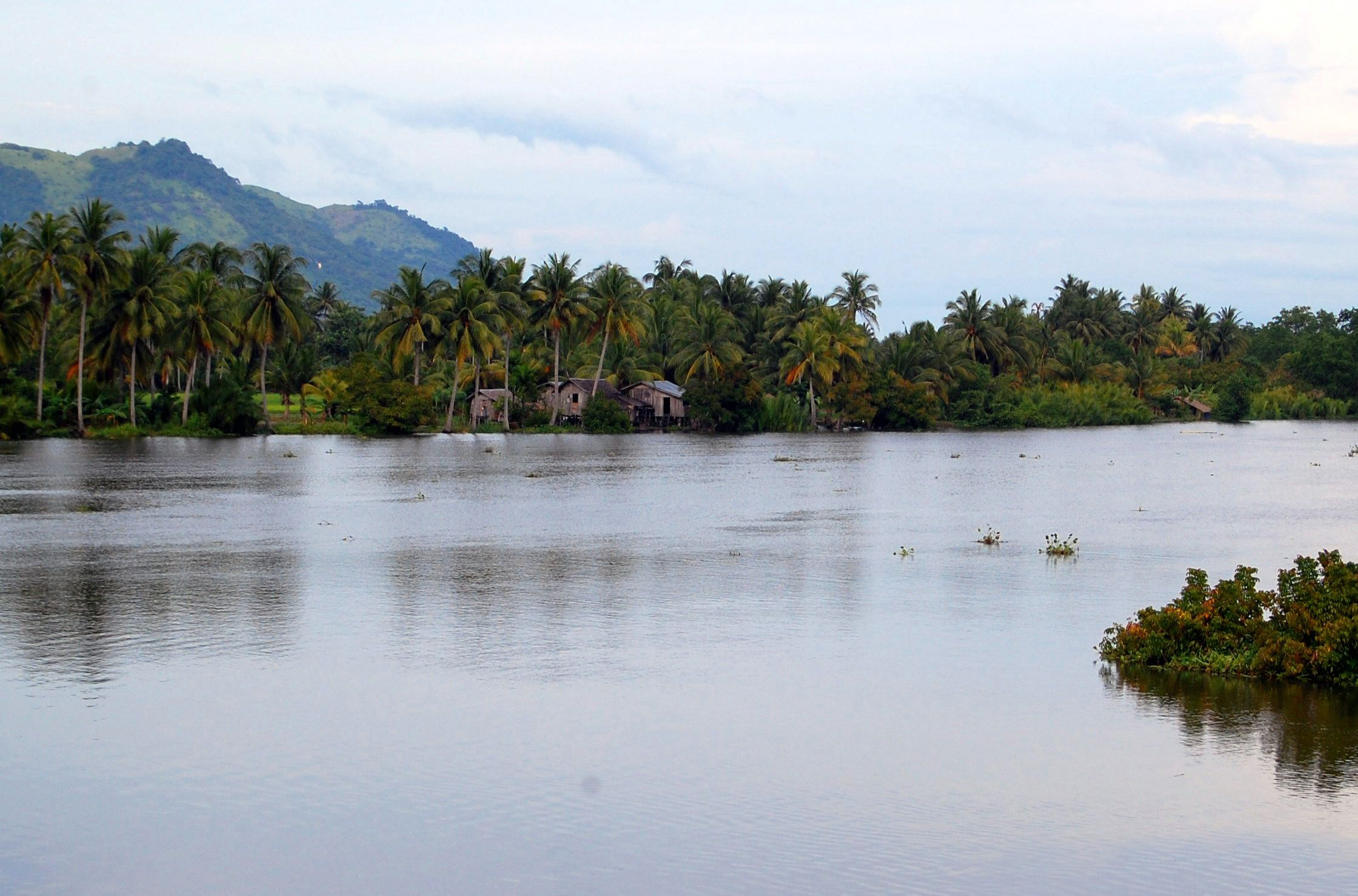

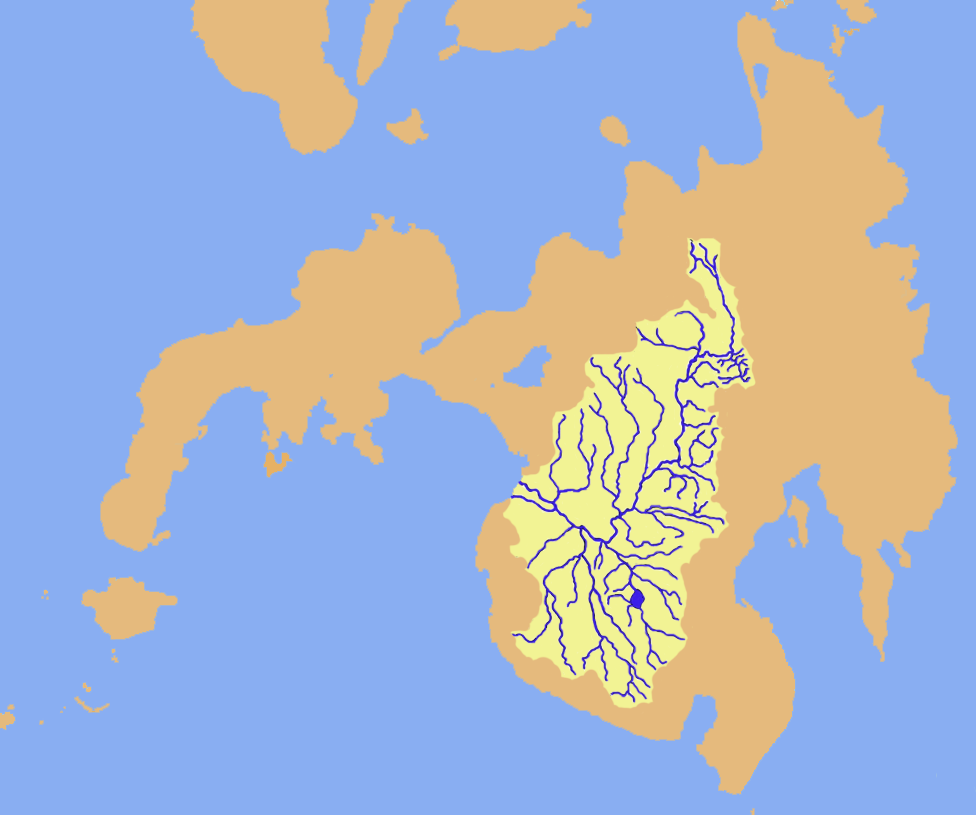
- Drainage map of Mindanao River

- Mindanao River mouth Rio Grande de Mindanao (Philippines)

Location
- Country: Philippines
- Region: Northern Mindanao; Soccsksargen; BARMM
- Province: Bukidnon; Maguindanao del Norte; Maguindanao del Sur; Cotabato
- Cities: Malaybalay; Valencia; Kidapawan; Koronadal; Cotabato City

Physical characteristics
- Source: Confluence of Kabacan and Pulangi rivers
  - location: Kabacan, Cotabato
  - coordinates: 7°08′34″N 124°48′10″E
- Mouth: Illana Bay
  - location: Cotabato City
  - coordinates: 7°15′20″N 124°12′0″E
  - elevation: 0 m (0 ft)
- Length: 125 km (78 mi) (Note: Total length Rio Grande de Mindanao–Pulangi Rivers system: 373 km or 397 km)
- Basin size: 23,169 km^{2} (8,946 mi^{2})
- Discharge
  - location: Near mouth
  - average: 852 m^{3}/s (30,100 cu ft/s)

Basin features
- River system: Rio Grande de Mindanao
- Tributaries
  - left: Kabacan, Allah, Kabulnan
  - right: Pulangi, Mal-Mar, Silik, Libungan, Simuay

The Rio Grande de Mindanao, also known as the Mindanao River, is the second-largest river system in the Philippines. Located on the southern island of Mindanao, with a total drainage area of 23,169 square kilometres (8,946 mi^{2}), draining the majority of the central and eastern portion of the island. It forms at the confluence of Kabacan and Pulangi rivers, and a total length of approximately 373 kilometres (232 mi) to its source at the head of the Pulangi River. It is an important transportation artery, used mainly in transporting agricultural products and, formerly, timber.

Its headwaters are in the Kitanglad Mountain Range of Impasugong, Bukidnon, south of Gingoog in Misamis Oriental, where it is called the Pulangi River. Joining the Kabacan River, it becomes the Mindanao River. Flowing out of the mountains, it forms the center of a broad, fertile plain in the southcentral portion of the island. Before its mouth in Illana Bay, it splits into two parallel sections, the Cotabato and Tamontaka, separated by a 180 metres (590 ft) hill.

Population centers along the river include Cotabato City, Datu Piang and Midsayap.

== Course ==
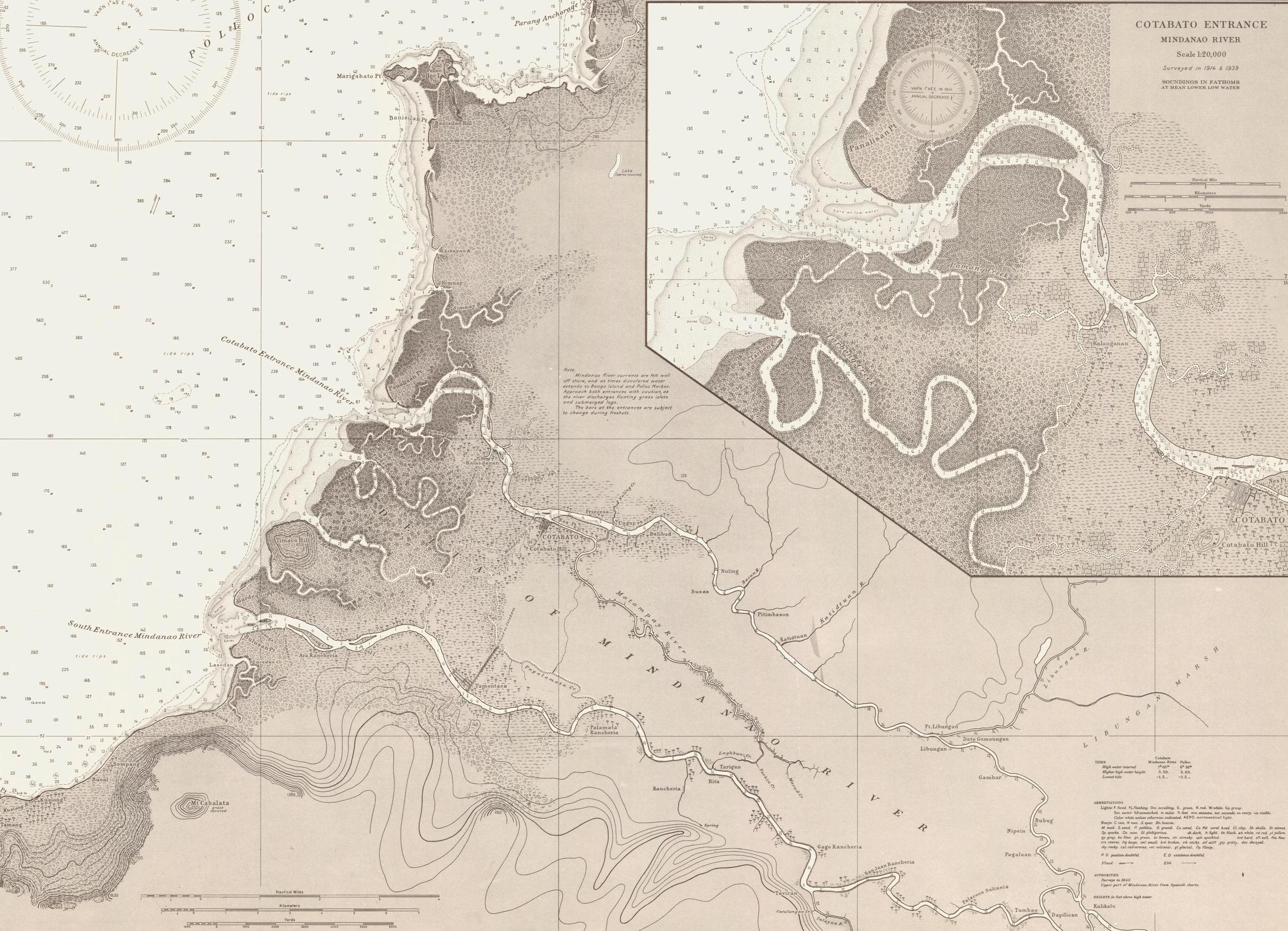
1917 map of the delta of the Mindanao River

The Rio Grande de Mindanao has its source in the Central Mindanao Highlands near the northern coast of the island, specifically on the northeastern part of the province of Bukidnon, where it is known as the Pulangi River. It then flows southward across the Bukidnon Plateau, fed up by its tributaries along the way and then emerges onto the Cotabato plains, depositing fertile mountain silt as it widens and arcs westward through the Cotabato River Basin. It finally empties into Illana Bay at its mouth at Cotabato City.

As the Mindanao River meets Illana Bay, it branches out into two distributaries, the Cotabato in the north and the Tamontaka in the south at Cotabato City.

== Tributaries ==
Rio Grande de Mindanao River List of tributaries by length.

- Pulangi River 374 km (232 mi)
- Kabulnan River 175 km (109 mi)
- Allah River 130 km (81 mi)
- Buluan River 109 km (68 mi)
- Simuay River 81 km (50 mi)
- Libungan River 80 km (50 mi)
- M'lang River 62 km (39 mi)

== Water hyacinths ==
The river has recently been clogged with water hyacinths, causing it to overflow after days of heavy rain. Floodwaters submerged at least 37 villages in Cotabato City alone and displaced some 6,000 families.

President Benigno Aquino III ordered public works and military personnel to clear the river of up to 20 ha (0.20 km^{2}) of water lily growth.
