= Liguasan Marsh =

Swamp and marsh area in Mindanao, Philippines

- Marsh
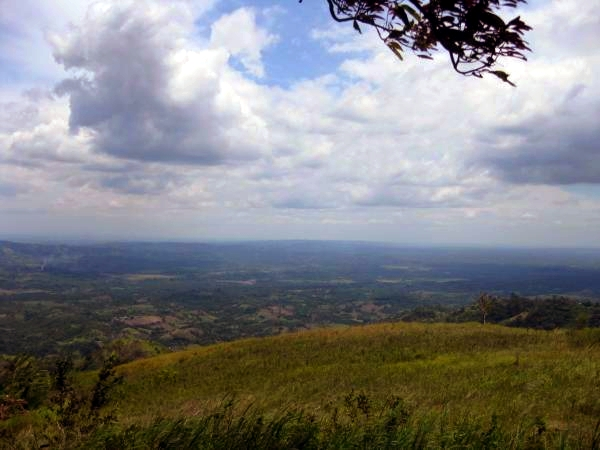
- View of the marsh from Mt. Akir Akir

- Location within Philippines
- Coordinates: 6.9667°N 124.6167°E
- Location: Mindanao, Philippines
- Part of: Mindanao River basin

Area
  - Total: 2,200 km^{2} (850 sq mi)

Liguasan Marsh, also known as Ligawasan Marsh, is the largest swamp and marsh area in south-central Mindanao, Philippines. It spans approximately 2,200 square kilometers (850 sq mi) across the provinces of Cotabato, Maguindanao del Norte, Maguindanao del Sur, and Sultan Kudarat. About 300 square kilometers (120 sq mi) of the marsh is designated as a game refuge and bird sanctuary.

The marsh is part of a complex river system featuring freshwater lakes, ponds, and marshes in the Mindanao River Basin. It actually consists of two adjoining basins: Liguasan Marsh and Libungan Marsh, each with distinct water regimes. Approximately 5,000 hectares of old-growth forest remain within the marsh.

== Biodiversity ==
At least 92 species of birds, dozens of fish species, six species of reptiles and five species of amphibians are recorded to live in the area. The marshland is the only area in the Philippines where the Comb-crested Jacana can be sighted according to the Haribon Foundation. The place is also one of the few places in the country where there are populations of the Philippine crocodile and the Estuarine crocodile, and in the forested area of the march, the Philippine eagle.

== Environmental and economic significance ==
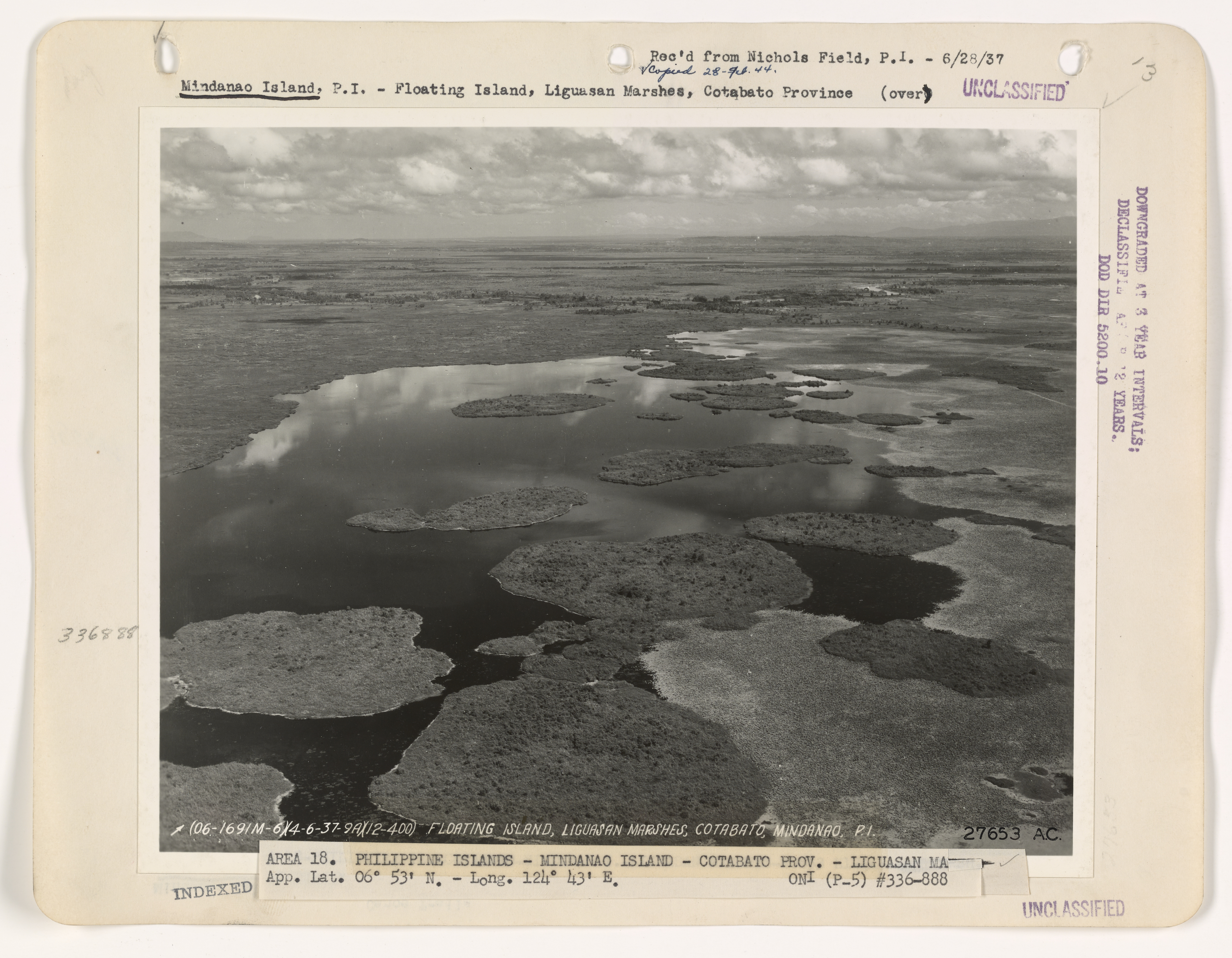
Aerial view of Liguasan Marsh, 1937

Liguasan Marsh plays a crucial role in flood mitigation by absorbing excess water from the Cotabato River Basin, which prevents downstream flooding and sustains farming in the lowlands. The marsh is also a key livelihood source for more than 112,000 Maguindanaon families, who rely on fishing during high water periods and agriculture during the dry season.

The marsh also faces significant threats from illegal fishing, deforestation, and land conversion for agriculture, which have caused habitat loss and degradation. Research conducted between 2015 and 2017 identified Common snakehead, Eurasian carp, Rohu, and Nile tilapia as the most commonly caught species in the area, with overfishing being a major concern due to the capture of immature individuals.

Liguasan Marsh is also noted for its natural gas deposit which is estimated to cover a radius of 300 square kilometers (120 sq mi).

== Conservation and legislation ==
Efforts to manage and conserve Liguasan Marsh have been ongoing. A measure in the Bangsamoro Parliament (BTA Bill No. 310, the LigMarsh Act of 2021), aims to consolidate efforts to protect and manage the marsh. The proposed Liguasan Marsh Management Commission would oversee the implementation of laws and policies concerning conservation and sustainable use of the marsh's natural resources.

Despite its protection, the marsh remains under threat from industrial activities such as natural gas extraction and urbanization. A study on the environmental status of the marsh identified high levels of phosphate and mercury in its waters, correlating these pollutants with land-use changes in surrounding municipalities.
