= Carmen, Cotabato =

Municipality in Cotabato, Philippines

Carmen
- Municipality
- Municipality of Carmen
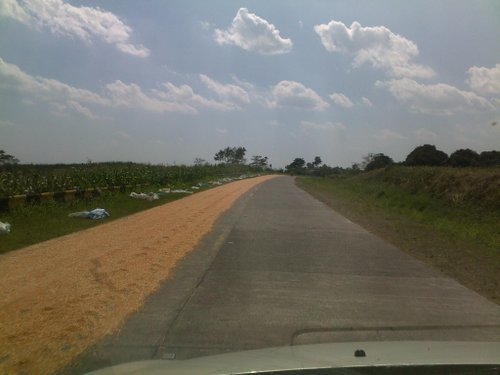
- Provincial road

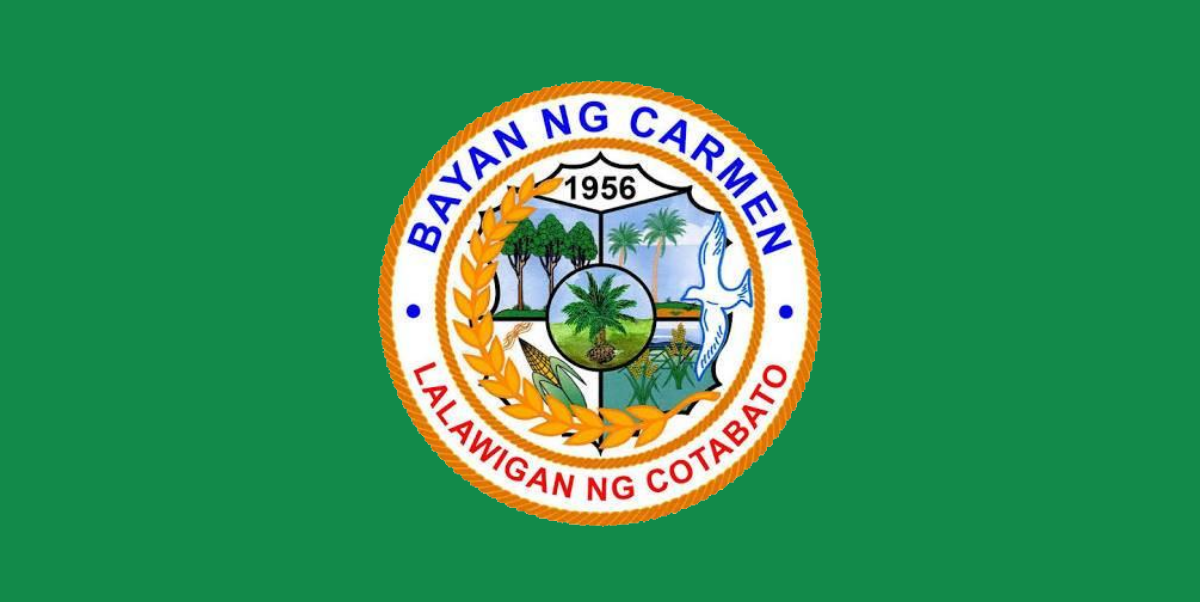
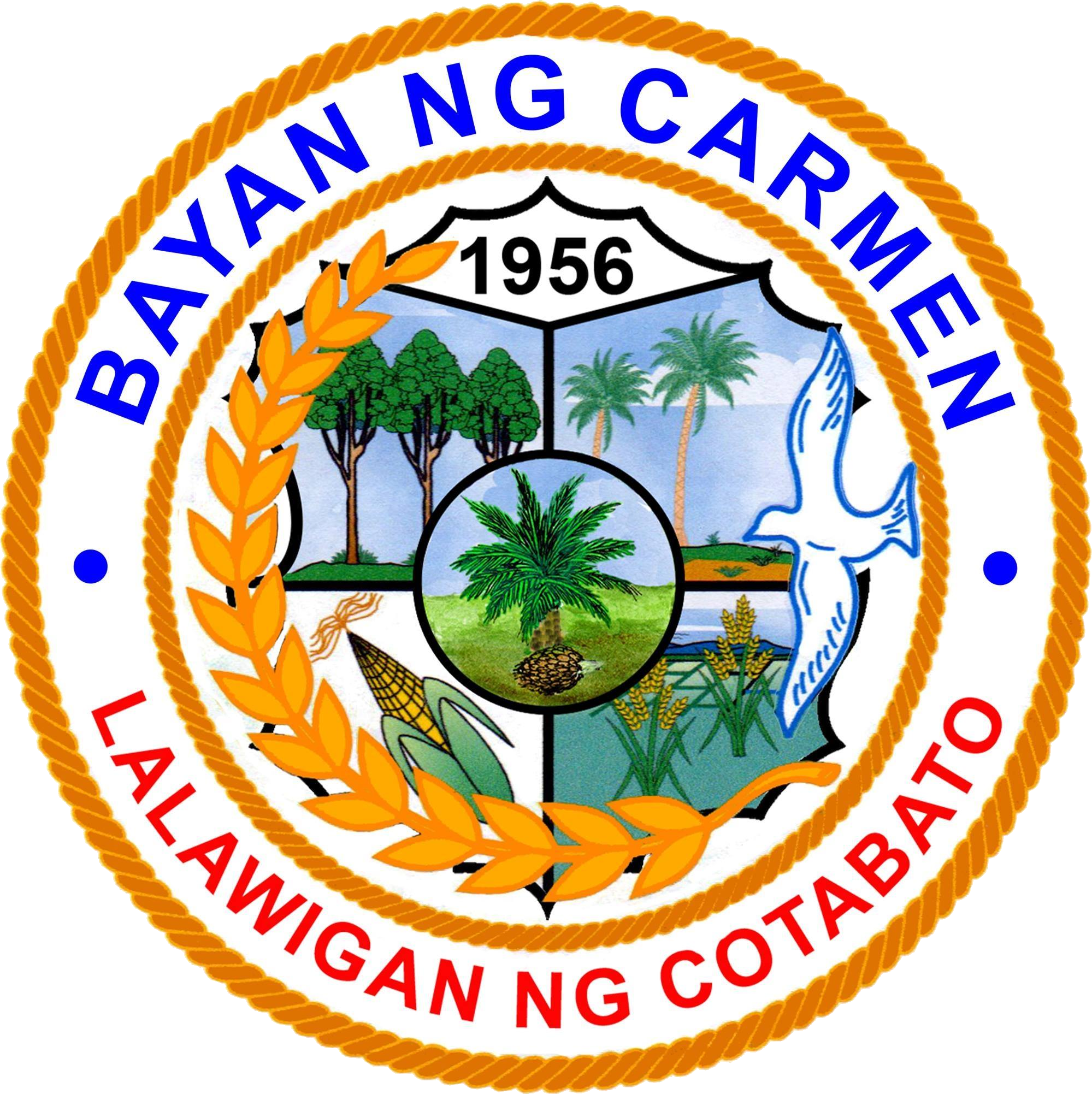
- Flag Seal

- Map of Cotabato with Carmen highlighted
- Interactive map of Carmen
- Location within the Philippines
- Coordinates: 7°12′16″N 124°47′42″E
- Country: Philippines
- Region: Soccsksargen
- Province: Cotabato
- District: 3rd district
- Founded: November 15, 1956
- Barangays: 28 (see Barangays)

Government
  - Type: Sangguniang Bayan
  - Mayor: Rogelio T. Taliño
  - Vice Mayor: Roger Ryan J. Taliño
  - Representative: Jose I. Tejada
  - Municipal Council: Members: Alberto G. Rivera; Jaime P. Sillador; Delfos A. Manampan; Benjamin A. Patricio Jr.; Anathy L. Naquitquitan; Arsenio D. Colago; Justo B. Saberola Jr.; Elmer A. Badoy
  - Electorate: 44,392 voters (2025)

Area
  - Total: 929.81 km^{2} (359.00 sq mi)
- Elevation: 45 m (148 ft)
- Highest elevation: 337 m (1,106 ft)
- Lowest elevation: 15 m (49 ft)

Population (2024 census)
  - Total: 79,741
  - Density: 85.761/km^{2} (222.12/sq mi)
  - Households: 18,913

Economy
  - Income class: 1st municipal income class
  - Poverty incidence: 30.92% (2023)
  - Revenue: ₱ 571.9 million (2024)
  - Assets: ₱ 1,357 million (2024)
  - Expenditure: ₱ 299.2 million (2024)
  - Liabilities: ₱ 188.3 million (2024)

Service provider
  - Electricity: Cotabato Electric Cooperative (COTELCO)
- Time zone: UTC+8 (PST)
- ZIP code: 9408
- PSGC: 1204702000
- IDD : area code: +63 (0)64
- Native languages: Hiligaynon; Cebuano; Maguindanao; Iranun; Tagalog
- Website: www.carmen-cotabatoprov.gov.ph

Carmen, officially the Municipality of Carmen (Hiligaynon: Banwa sang Carmen; Maguindanaon: Inged nu Karmin, Jawi: ايڠد نو كرمين; Cebuano: Lungsod sa Carmen; Tagalog: Bayan ng Carmen), is a municipality in the province of Cotabato, Philippines. According to the 2024 census, it has a population of 79,741 people.

== History ==
Carmen derived its name from surveyor del Carmen, chief of the Cadastral Survey Party, who in 1924 conducted a survey in the area. During the American period, Carmen and Kabacan belonged to one municipal district under Pikit. It was by virtue of Presidential Proclamation NO. 46 and, was reinforced by Executive Order No. 214 issued by the then President Ramon Magsaysay last November 15, 1956 when Carmen was created as a separate and distinct town of Kabacan.

When created a municipality, it was composed of Thirty Eight (38) barangays. Ten barangays were either claimed or ceded to the two adjacent municipalities, Banisilan and President Roxas. Six by the municipality of Banisilan and four to the municipality of President Roxas. Now, only twenty eight (28) barangays remain in which are presently inhabited by the so-called Tri-people composed of the Christians, the Muslims and Indigenous Peoples belonging to the Manobo-Aromanon ethnic group.

Before it was named Carmen, early inhabitants called this large tract of land "Kalalaw" a Maguindanaon term meaning "jar of water", because legend tells that there was once a big Balite tree with a continuous reservoir of water under its dense foliage, that even in long dry seasons, it had never dried up.

Later on, when early settlers came and cultivated large portions of land in what is now the Poblacion, the whole place was unofficially called "Landing" because of the Landing Field reservation of approximately two hundred (200) hectares. The name "Landing" later on changed to Carmen in honor of del Carmen.

The present Christian in this place are an immigrants from Luzon and Visayas. They are brought here by sheer pioneering spirit inspired by widespread rumors of this "Land of Opportunity and Promise". Their settlement started during the American regime. When the Americans launched their policy of attraction to the Muslims providing advanced technology, economic and educational advancement and the art of government. The first Christian settlers came from Cebu and established settlements at Pikit. Then adventurers followed them from Luzon and Visayas most notably the Ilongos and the Ilocanos who came in great numbers.

The territory was reduced when, through Batas Pambansa Blg. 141 of 1982, twelve barangays were separated to create the municipality of Banisilan.

=== Manili Massacre ===
The Manili massacre refers to the mass murder of 70–79 Moro Muslims, including women and children, committed in a mosque in Manili, Carmen, on June 19, 1971. The Muslim residents of the town had gathered in their mosque to participate in a supposed peace talk with Christian groups when a group of armed men dressed in uniforms similar to those worn by members of the Philippine Constabulary opened fire on them.

It was suspected that the Ilaga militant group were the attack's perpetrators, but there were also allegations that the Philippine Constabulary had collaborated with the Ilaga. No one was found culpable for the incident; Feliciano Lucas, also known as "Commander Toothpick", the Ilaga leader who was the prime suspect in the crime, was released after he "surrendered" to Ferdinand Marcos at the Malacañang Palace. The incident resulted in increased hostilities between Moro Muslims and Christians. In response to the incident, former Libyan leader Muammar Gaddafi provided military aid to the secessionist group Moro National Liberation Front.

=== Partial inclusion to the Bangsamoro ===
In 2019, seven barangays were among the 63 in the province which became part of the Special Geographic Area of the newly created Bangsamoro, after having the affirmative vote won to join the autonomous region in a plebiscite held on February 6. Manarapan and Nasapian were among the 39 in the province that unsuccessfully voted for the inclusion in the Autonomous Region in Muslim Mindanao in 2001, while the other five were proposed to be part of the Bangsamoro, which replaced ARMM by virtue of Republic Act No. 11054.

In 2023, the Bangsamoro Parliament approved the creation of eight new municipalities in the area. Those barangays were organized into Kapalawan (Bangsamoro Autonomy Act No. 45) following ratification in a plebiscite on April 13, 2024.

== Geography ==
The Municipality of Carmen is geographically located at about the points 124.8 degrees east and 7.2 degrees north. It is bound on the northeast by the Province of Bukidnon, on the east by the Municipalities of Pres. Roxas and Kabacan, on the southwest by the Municipality of Aleosan, on the west by the Municipality of Libungan, and on the northwest by the Municipality of Banisilan. It is embraced from the north-east, then east, then south by the Mulita and the Rio Grande rivers; from the north-west, then west, then south-west, by the Malitubog and Maridagao rivers. It is approximately 45 kilometers away from the capital town of Kidapawan.

=== Barangays ===
Carmen is politically subdivided into 21 barangays. Each barangay consists of puroks while some have sitios.

- Aroman
- Bentangan
- Cadiis
- General Luna
- Katanayanan
- Kibenes
- Kibudtongan
- Kilala
- Kimadzil
- Lanoon
- Liliongan
- Macabenban
- Malapag
- Manili
- Palanggalan
- Poblacion
- Ranzo
- Tacupan
- Tambad
- Tonganon
- Ugalingan (Lumayong)

=== Climate ===
Climate data for Carmen, Cotabato
Month	Jan	Feb	Mar	Apr	May	Jun	Jul	Aug	Sep	Oct	Nov	Dec	Year
Mean daily maximum °C (°F)	31 (88)	32 (90)	32 (90)	33 (91)	31 (88)	30 (86)	30 (86)	30 (86)	31 (88)	30 (86)	31 (88)	31 (88)	31 (88)
Mean daily minimum °C (°F)	21 (70)	21 (70)	22 (72)	23 (73)	23 (73)	23 (73)	23 (73)	23 (73)	23 (73)	23 (73)	23 (73)	22 (72)	23 (72)
Average precipitation mm (inches)	38 (1.5)	24 (0.9)	29 (1.1)	31 (1.2)	50 (2.0)	56 (2.2)	52 (2.0)	49 (1.9)	39 (1.5)	47 (1.9)	54 (2.1)	35 (1.4)	504 (19.7)
Average rainy days	10.1	7.5	10.0	11.5	19.7	20.8	19.4	18.5	16.3	18.5	18.4	12.8	183.5
Source: Meteoblue (Use with caution: this is modeled/calculated data, not measured locally.)

The municipality has an average temperature of 28 °C (82 °F) with a mean maximum of 32 °C (90 °F) and mean minimum of 23 °C (73 °F). The coldest part of the year are the months of December, January and February while the hottest are the months of April, May, June, August, and September. It has two (2) distinct seasons, the wet and the dry seasons. The farming season starts in early June and ends in late November when the dry season begins. Typhoon is seldom felt in the area as it is located outside the typhoon belt. This condition is very suitable to nearly every type of productive agricultural activity.

== Demographics ==
Population census of Carmen
Year	Pop.	±% p.a.
1918	1,686	—
1939	5,727	+6.00%
1960	25,768	+7.42%
1970	42,840	+5.21%
1975	22,956	−11.76%
1980	35,895	+9.35%
1990	36,213	+0.09%
1995	40,261	+2.01%
2000	45,909	+2.85%
2007	65,670	+5.06%
2010	82,469	+8.64%
2015	95,921	+2.92%
2020	79,140	−3.97%
2024	79,741	+0.18%
Source: Philippine Statistics Authority; 2020 Census count was revised as per PSA Board Resolution; No. 13 Series of 2021 adopted on November 9, 2021.

In the 2024 census, the population of Carmen was 79,741 people, with a density of 72 inhabitants per square kilometre or 190 inhabitants per square mile.

== Economy ==
Poverty incidence of Carmen (%)

Source: Philippine Statistics Authority

Since the municipality is an agricultural area, most of the industries are agri-based. Seven barangays have cono rice mills a barangay have kiskisan, 4 barangays have rubber roller mills. Total is 13 cono rice mill, 12 kiskisan and 5 rubber rollers. There is a bright prospect on cottage industries, which utilized raw materials like rattan and bamboo. Rattan craft in barangays Dado could possibly generate employment to its residents. The 40 hectares bamboo plantation at Barangay Guiling can provide fro raw materials to the bamboo craft at Kitacubong. This cottage industry is gaining support and acceptance from local residents considering the affordability and its unique qualities. Technology transfer and skills training have been conducted in the area. Its clients are the prospective entrepreneurs in rattan, bamboo and coconut crafts. Recipients of the training and development seminars are: RIC Camansi, Lower Dado, Pacao, Raradangan the DTI-CARP has establish a Multi-Purpose Hot dryer at Barangay Pacao, the said project generate employment and income from drying service. Barangay Parauran and Pacao could possibly support a fruit juice making industry, the 500 mango trees could adequately supplies for this industry.

=== Natural resources ===
The commonly known minerals present in the municipality are sand and gravel which volume and potential are good sources for quarrying but which up to the present are mostly untapped. Other metallic substance of high commercial value are known to be present but these are still unexplored.

Other resources present in the municipality are the large volume of limestone that can be processed into cement. Guano also abounds in numerous caves in the municipality such as in barangays Liliongan and Tonganon. Guano can be manufactured into fertilizers.

== Government ==
=== List of former chief executives ===
- Dima Dalid (1968–1972)
- Gonzalo O. Cuarenta (1992–1995)
- Rogelio Taliño (1995–2007)
- Noemi J. Taliño (2007–2010)
- Rogelio T. Taliño (2010–2019)
- Moises C. Arendain (2019–2022)

== Tourism ==
- Liliongan cave, a natural cave with beautiful stalactite and stalagmites formations inside underground creek and thick layer of guano could also be found inside the cave. It is located at Barangay Liliongan, Carmen.
- Kavurunan Festival celebrates the culture and tradition of the distinct Indigenous people (IP) of the different tribes located in the town of Carmen, Cotabato. The Festivals name is derived from the indigenous Manobo tribe word meaning "gathering". This festival also celebrates the coming together of the three ethnic groups located in the area which are the indigenous people, Christians, and Muslims.
