= Clusters of the Special Geographic Area =

- Location: Philippines
- Found in: Municipalities in Cotabato
- Created: c. 2020
- Abolished: 2024
- Number: 8 (as of 2024)
- Populations: 16,658–38,795
- Government: Special Geographic Area Development Authority
- Subdivisions: Barangays

The clusters of the Special Geographic Area (SGA) were administrative groupings of the 63 barangays of Bangsamoro located within Cotabato, a province of Soccsksargen in the Philippines, prior to the creation of the eight SGA municipalities in 2024.

== List ==
The 63 barangays of the Special Geographic Area (SGA) of Bangsamoro were grouped into eight area clusters. Each barangay consisted of puroks, while some also contained sitios.

Area clusters of the Special Geographic Area
Cluster	Population (2020)
Carmen	28,463
Kabacan	16,658
Midsayap I	25,573
Midsayap II	22,438
Pigcawayan	19,627
Pikit I	38,795
Pikit II	34,341
Pikit III	29,538
Total: Eight clusters	215,433

== Other statistics ==
=== Barangays per cluster ===
Bangsamoro barangays in Cotabato
Barangay	Municipality	Cluster	Population (2020)
Balacayon	Pigcawayan	Pigcawayan	1,306
Bago-inged	Pikit	Pikit II	3,080
Barungis	Pikit	Pikit II	3,367
Batulawan	Pikit	Pikit I	6,306
Bualan	Pikit	Pikit III	2,177
Buliok	Pikit	Pikit II	4,624
Bulol	Pikit	Pikit II	5,145
Buluan	Kabacan	Kabacan	1,418
Buricain	Pigcawayan	Pigcawayan	1,626
Central Labas	Midsayap	Midsayap I	1,997
Damatulan	Midsayap	Midsayap II	4,570
Datu Binasing	Pigcawayan	Pigcawayan	1,650
Datu Mantil	Pigcawayan	Pigcawayan	1,220
Dunguan	Aleosan	Pikit III	3,285
Fort Pikit	Pikit	Pikit I	7,476
Gli-Gli	Pikit	Pikit II	3,861
Gokotan	Pikit	Pikit I	5,494
Kabalasan	Pikit	Pikit II	7,591
Kadigasan	Midsayap	Midsayap II	5,441
Kadingilan	Midsayap	Midsayap II	2,414
Kadingilan	Pigcawayan	Pigcawayan	1,683
Kapinpilin	Midsayap	Midsayap I	4,593
Kibayao	Carmen	Carmen	7,146
Kitulaan	Carmen	Carmen	6,079
Kudangaran	Midsayap	Midsayap II	3,218
Lagunde	Pikit	Pikit III	5,332
Langogan	Carmen	Carmen	2,082
Libungan Torreta	Pigcawayan	Pigcawayan	2,290
Lower Baguer	Pigcawayan	Pigcawayan	1,208
Lower Pangangkalan	Pigcawayan	Pigcawayan	1,129
Macabual	Pikit	Pikit II	4,557
Macasendeg	Pikit	Pikit III	2,516
Malingao	Midsayap	Midsayap I	4,456
Manaulanan	Pikit	Pikit III	7,632
Manarapan	Carmen	Carmen	4,355
Matilac	Pigcawayan	Pigcawayan	1,817
Mudseng	Midsayap	Midsayap I	2,831
Nabalawag	Midsayap	Midsayap II	3,093
Nabundas	Pikit	Pikit I	4,996
Nalapaan	Pikit	Pikit I	2,323
Nanga-an	Kabacan	Kabacan	3,715
Nunguan	Pikit	Pikit I	5,380
Nasapian	Carmen	Carmen	4,423
Olandang	Midsayap	Midsayap II	3,702
Panicupan	Pikit	Pikit I	2,357
Patot	Pigcawayan	Pigcawayan	2,287
Pebpoluan	Carmen	Carmen	1,038
Pedtad	Kabacan	Kabacan	4,593
Pamalian	Pikit	Pikit III	3,256
Rajah Muda	Pikit	Pikit II	2,116
S. Balong	Pikit	Pikit III	3,573
S. Balongis	Pikit	Pikit I	4,463
Sambulawan	Midsayap	Midsayap I	3,599
Sanggadong	Kabacan	Kabacan	869
Simbuhay	Kabacan	Kabacan	1,871
Simone	Kabacan	Kabacan	2,652
Simsiman	Pigcawayan	Pigcawayan	2,506
Tamped	Kabacan	Kabacan	1,540
Tapodoc	Aleosan	Pikit III	1,767
Tugal	Midsayap	Midsayap I	4,665
Tumbras	Midsayap	Midsayap I	3,432
Tupig	Carmen	Carmen	3,340
Upper Pangankalan	Pigcawayan	Pigcawayan	905
Total population			215,433

==== Barangays per municipality ====
Number of barangays per municipality
Municipality	No of barangays
Aleosan	2
Carmen	7
Kabacan	7
Midsayap	13
Pigcawayan	12
Pikit	22
Total: Six municipalities	63

==== Municipalities created in 2024 ====
New municipality	Cluster
Kadayangan	Midsayap I
Kapalawan	Carmen
Ligawasan	Pikit II
Malidegao	Pikit I
Nabalawag	Midsayap II
Nabalawag	Pikit III
Old Kaabakan	Kabacan
Pahamudin	Pigcawayan
Tugunan	Pikit III

== Map ==
Area clusters of the Special Geographic Area of Bangsamoro: Pigcawayan cluster Midsayap I cluster Midsayap II cluster Kabacan cluster Carmen cluster Pikit I cluster Pikit II cluster Pikit III cluster
