= Santo Niño Church (Midsayap) =

Roman Catholic church in Cotabato, Philippines

- Archdiocesan Shrine of Señor Santo Niño
- Location in Mindanao Location in the Philippines
- 7°11′17″N 124°32′03″E
- Location: Midsayap, Cotabato
- Country: Philippines
- Denomination: Roman Catholic

History
- Former name: Santo Niño Parish Church
- Founded: 1939
- Founder(s): Rev. Fr. Egide Beaudin, OMI

Architecture
- Functional status: Active
- Architectural type: Church building
- Style: Modern

Administration
- Province: Roman Catholic Ecclesiastical Province of Cotabato
- Archdiocese: Cotabato

Clergy
- Archbishop: Most. Rev. Charlie M. Inzon, OMI, DD
- Priests: Fr. Lauro De Guia, OMI (Parish Priest); Fr. Joshua Dela Vega, OMI (Parochial Vicar)

The Archdiocesan Shrine of Señor Santo Niño is a Roman Catholic parish and archdiocesan shrine located in Midsayap, Cotabato, Philippines. It is under the ecclesiastical jurisdiction of the Archdiocese of Cotabato. Santo Niño Parish is the oldest parish church established by the missionary congregation of the Oblates of Mary Immaculate in 1939.

== History ==
The pioneering OMI priests took over the missionary territory of Cotabato which includes Midsayap which during that time covers Midsayap, Libungan, Pigcawayan, Alamada and Aleosan. It was initiated by a French-Canadian Oblate priest, Rev. Fr. Egide Beaudin, OMI to fortify the evangelization of Christian settlers in the locality who were mostly coming from Visayas and Luzon. Fr. Beaudin made frequent contacts with the faithfuls where he was able to learn the Cebuano language. Beaudin got help from the people to construct a worship place dedicated to the Child Jesus to whom most Cebuano settlers adored from their hometown of Cebu.

When the Second World War broke in 1941, the mission parish of Santo Niño was closed as turmoil reached Mindanao by invading Japanese forces. Foreign missionaries including the Oblates were put to concentration camps in the University of Santo Tomas and the University of the Philippines in Los Baños, Laguna.

After the war, the OMI priests went back to Midsayap to pursue the missioning to its people. American oblates took over the management of their mission stations including schools. Rev. Fr. Cuthbert B. Billman, OMI became the parish priest from 1945–1946. He was followed by Rev. Fr. Robert E. Sullivan, OMI from 1947-1948 which was also the time when the oblates established the first Notre Dame school in the Asia, the Notre Dame of Midsayap College. From 1949–1950, the parish was under Rev. Fr. Joseph Billman, OMI and assisted by Rev. Fr. Edward Gordon, OMI and Rev. Fr. Francis McSorley, OMI (who was later appointed as bishop-prelate of the Apostolic Vicariate of Jolo which covers the whole provinces of Sulu and Tawi-Tawi).

During the 1970s, the OMI congregation deemed it was time to slowly turn over the parish to Filipino priests by assigning them to large parishes such as Santo Niño. From 1970–1974, Rev. Fr. Donald Mundy, OMI commissioned a young Filipino oblate priest, Rev. Fr. Amador T. Castillo, OMI to work out major expansions in the parish by creating new chapels in the outskirts and remote barrios of Midsayap and Aleosan (which was part of the parish during that time).

For the period of 2001–2006, Rev. Fr. Eduardo Santoyo, OMI assisted by Rev. Fr. Danilo Sergio, OMI and the younger Rev. Fr. Jay Virador, OMI made large developments in the church renovation of the already old church.

== Highlights ==
- The parish was officially declared as an Archdiocesan Shrine of Santo Niño de Midsayap in January 2012.
- The parish has one of the most number of chapels covering most of the barangays of Midsayap and part of Northern Kabuntalan, Maguindanao del Norte.
- On April 18, 2019, another church was built in Purok Tres Rosas, Brgy. Sadaan. The Parish is now composed of six districts: Upper Bulanan District, Kimagango District, Sadaan District, Poblacion District, Salunayan District, and San Isidro District. There are 69 chapels and 758 Gagmay Kristohanong Katilingban (GKKs).
- In the Year 1 Parish Pastoral General Assembly on July 17, 2024, the official name of the parish is Archdiocesan Shrine and Parish of Señor Sto. Niño, recognizing the Church as a Parish and a Shrine. (General Decree 11/25/2012)
- The Parish has 6 masses for sunday including the Anticipated Mass (Saturday - English) 5:30pm. These masses are the following; 5:30am (Ilonggo), 7:00am (Cebuano), 8:30am (Tagalog), 4:00pm (English), 5:30pm (English). The parish has also 5:30am daily mass, 5:30pm - Wednesday(Novena Mass for Mother of Perpetual Help) and 5:30pm - Friday (Novena Mass for Señor Sto. Niño).
