= Heritage management in the Philippines =

Heritage management in the Philippines is guided by laws and agencies that create regulations for potentially destructive behaviors such as excavations and demolition. Legislation pertaining to heritage management consists of Republic Acts and Presidential Decrees. Organizations such as UNESCO, the National Commission for Culture and the Arts, and the Heritage Conservation Society are also referred to in laws.

Republic Acts are pieces "of legislation used to create policy in order to carry out the principles of the Constitution." They are written by Congress and approved by the President. The National Heritage act is a Republic Act which created the Philippine Registry of Cultural Property and gave ultimate power to the National Museum of the Philippines. The Local Government Code is a Republic Act which required the national government to collaborate with local governing bodies when preparing to damage land. The General Appropriations Acts are Republic Acts which required certain agencies to avoid damaging cultural properties including bridges, train stations, capitol buildings, and universities. The Indigenous Peoples' Act was a Republic Act which gave consideration and ownership to indigenous people who would be affected by any excavation or damage. The Cultural Properties Preservation and Protection Act required digging teams to report findings to the Director of the National Museum.

The purpose of Presidential Decrees was and is "to arrogate unto the Chief Executive the lawmaking powers of Congress." Presidential Decree No. 105 defined National Shrines and enforced their safety by threatening violators with 10 or more years in prison, a fine of 10,000 pesos, or both. Presidential Decree No. 374 provided a definition for the phrase National Cultural Treasure. Presidential Decree No. 374 added certain sites to the list of Philippine National Cultural Treasures. Presidential Decree No. 1505 made it illegal to "modify, alter, repair, or destroy" the natural state of national shrines and landmarks without consent from the National Historical Institute of the Philippines, punishable by 1 to 5 years in prison or a fine between 1,000 and 10,000 pesos.

These laws can be separated into categories such as built environment, indigenous peoples' laws, and intangible heritage. The National Cultural Heritage Act is an example of built environment legislation, the Indigenous Peoples' Rights Act is an example of indigenous peoples' legislation, and both Presidential Decree No. 374 and the Cultural Properties Preservation and Protection Act refer to National Cultural Treasures which include intangible heritage. Heritage management in the Philippines is not only about archaeology, it is about peoples' relationship to, and ownership of, their culture.

== Republic Acts ==
=== National Cultural Heritage Act of 2009 ===
==== (Republic Act No. 10066) ====
An act which established a Philippine Registry of Cultural Property, which was to be controlled by the National Commission for Culture and the Arts. It also gave protection to buildings that were more than 50 years old. It established categories of cultural property, such as works by a national artist, archaeological and traditional ethnographic materials, archival material dating to at least 50 years, and works of national heroes. It created guidelines for anthropological research, such as a requirement to communicate with the National Museum of the Philippines before organizations can be allowed to excavate and a requirement to document findings with the Philippine Registry of Cultural Property. The National Cultural Heritage Act also prohibited acts such as destroying, modifying, or mutilating any world heritage site and selling or distributing material that was lost by its rightful owner.

=== Local Government Code of 1991 ===
==== (Republic Act No. 7160) ====
An act established to decentralize the decision-making process as it pertains to Philippine land and cultural artifacts. It was an effort to give a voice to communities by appointing local stakeholders who would collaborate with the national government. It required the national government to periodically consult with the appointed Local Government Units (LGU) before it could be allowed to implement any program within its jurisdiction, especially programs with potential to disrupt or disturb culturally important artifacts in their original state.

=== General Appropriations Act of 2015 ===
==== (Republic Act No. 10651) ====
An act that made it the responsibility of the department of education to "preserve and restore the existing Gabaldon school buildings as part of the preservation of the country's cultural heritage". Gabaldon school buildings were built in the Philippines during the American Colonial period and are considered to be of significant cultural value. The Gabaldon school buildings are also protected by Republic Act No. 10066 and Republic Act No. 11194. They made it illegal to demolish these buildings.

=== General Appropriations Act of 2016 ===
==== (Republic Act No. 10717) ====
An act that added "other heritage school buildings" to the list of things that the department of education was required to preserve and protect. It also required "prior approval of government cultural agencies and proper consultation with stakeholders and cultural groups" in order to demolish cultural properties. These cultural properties included but were not limited to provincial capitol buildings, city hall, municipal hall, monuments, fountains, parks and plazas, state colleges and universities, lighthouses, bridges, public hospitals, train stations, museums, public libraries, stadiums, prisons and government offices. The act also held agencies responsible for structures such as roads and bridges which impacted heritage conservation when being built.

=== General Appropriations Act of 2017 ===
==== (Republic Act No. 10924) ====
An act that referred to Republic Act No. 10066 and required agencies mentioned in it (National Parks Development Committee, Department of Public Works and Highways, Department of Tourism, and more) to consult with the NCCA before carrying out their responsibilities. It also called for the protection of built heritage and cultural landscapes, including but not limited to provincial capitol buildings, city hall, municipal hall, monuments, fountains, parks and plazas, state colleges and universities, lighthouses, bridges, public hospitals, train stations, museums, public libraries, stadiums, prisons and government offices. It required approval of government cultural agencies, the NCCA, and stakeholders, to alter, renovate, or demolish important cultural properties.

=== Indigenous Peoples' Rights Act of 1997 ===
==== (Republic Act No. 8371) ====
An act created to "makes provisions for the promotion and recognition of the rights of Indigenous Cultural Communities/Indigenous Peoples, with a view to preserve their culture, traditions and institutions and to ensure the equal protection and non-discrimination of members". It was intended to recognize, "protect and promote the rights of indigenous cultural communities/indigenous peoples, creating a national commission on indigenous peoples, establishing implementing mechanisms, appropriating funds therefor, and for other purposes".

=== Cultural Properties Preservation and Protection Act ===
==== (Republic Act No. 4846) ====
An act that required that anyone wishing to excavate would obtain written permission from the Director of the National Museum of the Philippines. It requires archaeologists supervising excavations to be certified by the Museum and requires archaeologists to catalogue their excavations and to halt digging when they find any artifacts, because any findings must be reported to the Museum Director. It required any digging on government or private property to be carried out by the Museum or a group authorized by the Museum.

== Presidential Decrees ==
=== Presidential Decree No. 105 ===
A law signed in 1973, "declaring national shrines as sacred places and prohibiting desecration thereof". Presidential Decree No. 105 also designated "certain places in the country as National Shrines because they were the sites of the birth, exile, imprisonment, detention or death of great and eminent leaders of the nation" and puts pressure on the Philippine government to protect National Shrines as hallowed places. Convicted violators of Presidential Decree No. 105 are subject to 10 or more years' imprisonment, a fine of 10,000 or more pesos, or both, at the discretion of the court.

=== Presidential Decree No. 374 ===
A law signed in 1974, also known as the Cultural Properties Preservation and Protection Act, which created guidelines for the National Museum to follow when processing National Cultural Treasure. It required that "any cultural property exported or sold locally must be registered with the National Museum." It defined a National Cultural Treasure as the following; "a unique object found locally, possessing outstanding historical, cultural, artistic and/or scientific value which is highly significant and important to [the Philippines]."

=== Presidential Decree No. 375 ===
A law that built upon Presidential Decree No. 374 and was also signed in 1974. This law added the Basilica of Taal, Church of Santa Maria, Barasoin Church, Tirad Pass, Miagao Church, the battle site of the Battle of Mactan, San Sebastian Church, and the Church of Santo Niño to the list of National Cultural Treasures.

=== Presidential Decree No. 1505 ===
A law signed in 1978 which prohibited "the unauthorized modification, alteration, repair and destruction of original features of all national shrines, monuments, landmarks and other important historical edifices." Presidential Decree No. 1505 also made it unlawful to "modify, alter, repair, or destroy" the natural state of national shrines, landmarks, and other sites deemed important by the National Historical Institute of the Philippines, without written consent of the chair of the institute. Convicted violators of Presidential Decree No. 1505 are subject to anywhere between 1 and 5 years in prison or a fine between 1,000 and 10,000 pesos.

== Other Agencies ==
=== UNESCO ===
The United Nations Educational, Scientific and Cultural Organization functions to designate world heritage sites, which are places that hold outstanding universal value to humanity and humanity's history. The title world heritage site provides protection since most of the statutes and laws regarding preservation of Philippine heritage give protection to UNESCO world heritage sites. Included in the list of World Heritage Sites in the Philippines are the rice terraces in the Cordilleras, and sites currently being considered for addition to the list are located in Butuan, the Cagayan Valley, and the Tabon Cave complex, where Tabon man was found.

=== The National Museum of the Philippines ===
The National Museum of the Philippines was given power by the National Museum Act of 1998, or Republic Act No. 8492. It was an act that cut the Museum's ties to the NCCA and the Department of Education. It placed the Museum under the Office of the President only. The National Museum's function is to "obtain, keep, study and present material evidence of man and his environment" and "inform the general public about these activities for the purpose of study, education and entertainment."

=== National Commission for Culture and the Arts ===
The National Commission for Culture and the Arts is "the official government agency for culture in the Philippines." It makes policies regarding, and gifts grants to, anything associated with the "preservation, development and promotion of Philippine arts and culture."

=== Intramuros Administration ===
The Intramuros Administration was created under Presidential Decree No. 1616 with the mandate of ensuring the restoration and orderly development of Intramuros as a monument to the Hispanic era of Philippine History.

=== Heritage Conservation Society ===
The Heritage Conservation Society (HCS) is an organization which aims to protect and preserve built heritage and historical or cultural sites, to uphold that "heritage and culture should be developed and preserved for national identity." HCS utilizes volunteerism and advocacy work to contribute to the preservation of Philippine built heritage, which is HCS's is primary concern. HCS defines conservation as "all the processes and measures of maintaining the cultural significance of a cultural property including, but not limited to, preservation, restoration, reconstruction, protection, adaptation or any combination thereof."

== Cultural ownership ==
Due to the nature of museums, their primary interest is not to advocate on behalf of cultural groups, but to collect items of cultural and historical significance. Therefore, artifacts found during excavations tend to end up with museums and organizations instead of being returned to the people with whom they belong. There are acts and laws that have been working to combat this problematic phenomenon around the world:

- NAGPRA
- Indigenous Peoples' Rights Act of 1997
- Indian Reorganization Act
- Archaeological Resources Protection Act
