= Special Geographic Area's 1st parliamentary district =

Parliamentary district for the Bangsamoro Parliament

- Constituency for the Bangsamoro Parliament
- Boundary of the Special Geographic Area's 1st parliamentary district in the Special Geographic Area
- Area: Special Geographic Area
- Population: 104,582 (2024)
- Electorate: 62,637 (2026)

Current constituency
- Member of Parliament: Mansor Ebrahim (elect)
- Political party: UBJP

The Special Geographic Area's 1st parliamentary district is the first of the two parliamentary districts of the Special Geographic Area for the Bangsamoro Parliament. It is composed of the municipalities of Kadayangan, Nabalawag, Pahamuddin, Tugunan in Cotabato.

Mansor Ebrahim of the United Bangsamoro Justice Party is the member of Parliament-elect for the district following the inaugural 2026 Bangsamoro Parliament election. He will assume office on October 30, 2026.

== List of MPs representing the district ==
No.	Portrait	Member (Lifespan)	Term of office	Party	Parliament	Electoral history	Constituencies
1		Mansor Ebrahim (born 1977)	Assuming office on October 30, 2026	UBJP	1st Parliament	Elected in 2026.	2026–present Kadayangan, Nabalawag, Pahamuddin, Tugunan

== Election results ==
=== 2026 ===
2026 Bangsamoro Parliament election in the Special Geographic Area
Party	Candidate	Votes	%
UBJP	Mansor Ebrahim	29,061	62.57
BFP	Butch Malang	17,386	37.43
Total votes		46,447	100.00
UBJP win (new seat)			
