= Fort Pikit =

Historic fort in Cotabato, Philippines

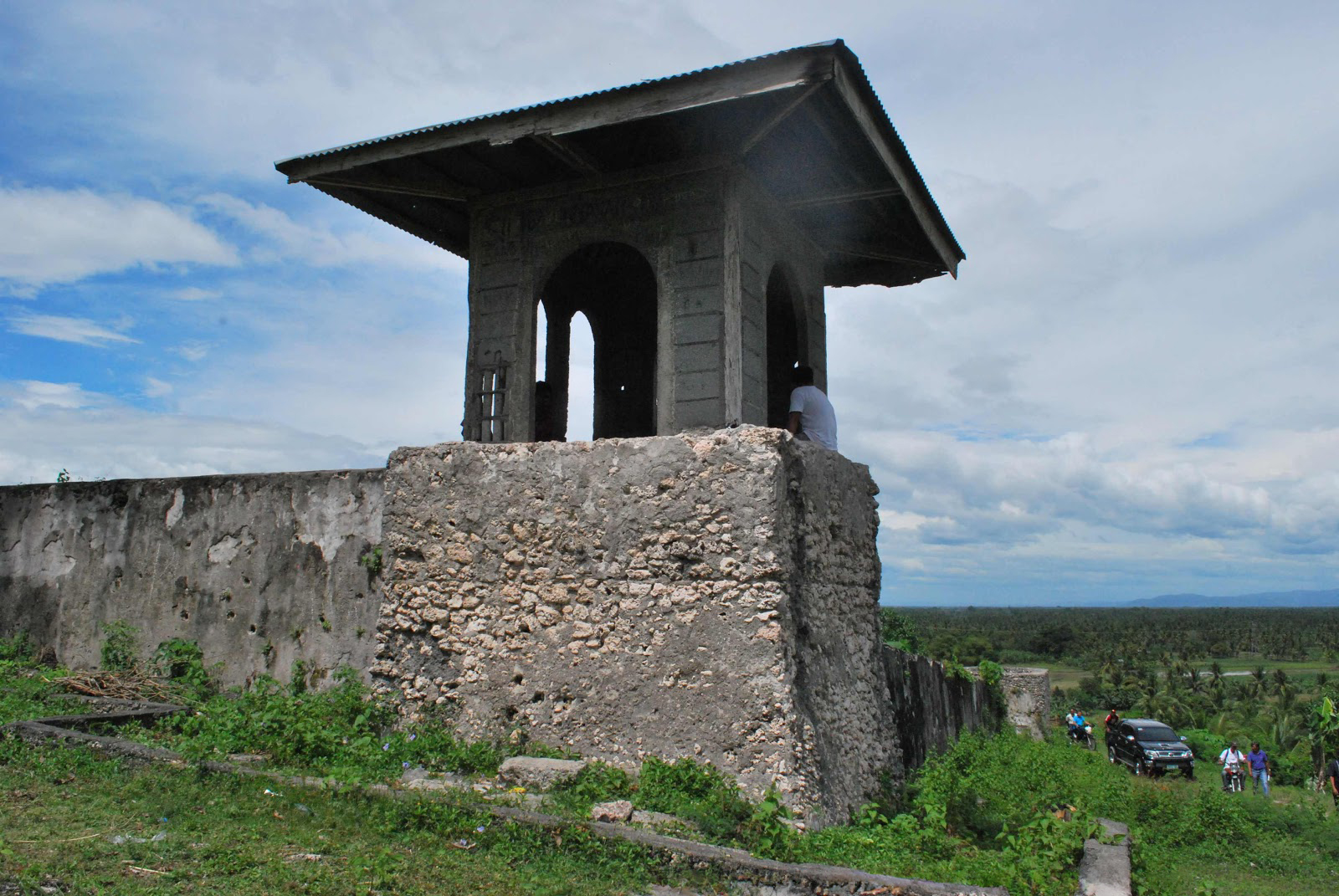
- Interactive map of Fort Pikit
- 7°03′41″N 124°40′41″E
- Location: Brgy. Fort Pikit, Malidegao, Cotabato (Bangsamoro Special Geographic Area)

History
- Built: 1893
- Original use: Military fortification

Site notes
- Architectural style: Spanish colonial
- Current use: Historic site

National Historical Landmarks
- Official name: Fort Pikit
- Designated: April 24, 2012

Fort Pikit is a Spanish colonial era stone fortification which was built in what is now known as the town of Malidegao in Cotabato. The fortification consists of two towers installed with artillery batteries and a rubble wall which measures 38 meters (125 ft) a side. It was intended to house a military officer, 60 infantrymen and 6 artillerymen by its Spanish builders.

It is situated at the back of the Municipal Hall of Pikit (Note: The site of the fort was under the municipality of Pikit until 2024 when Malidegao was established.). on a hill facing the National Highway.

== History ==
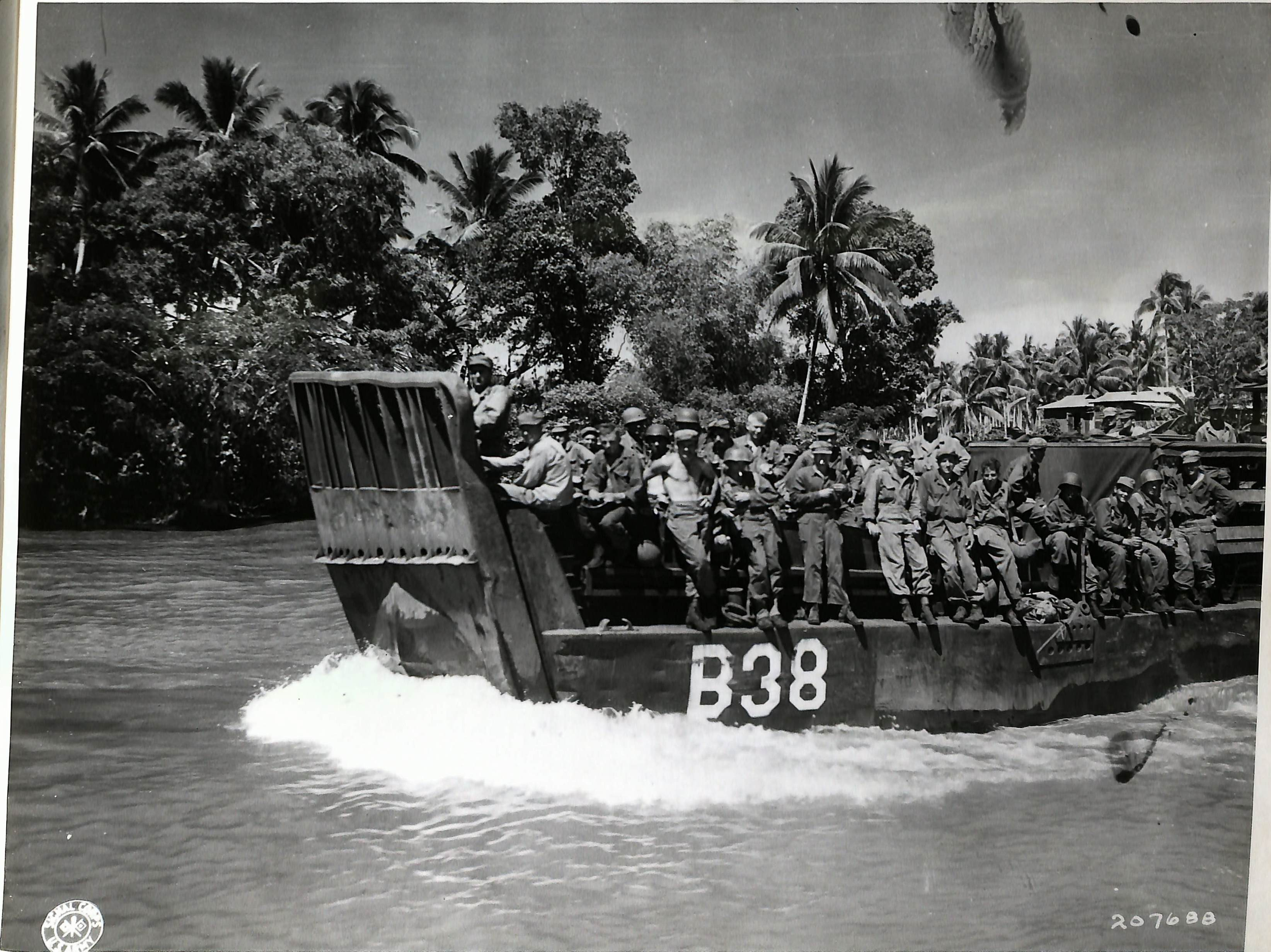
US landing craft carrying 24th Infantry Division troops up Mindanao River for Fort Pikit attack, April 1945

Fort Pikit was built in 1893 by the Spanish at the time the Spanish colonial government was actively launching a campaign against the Moro in Mindanao. When the United States took over the administration of the Philippines from Spain, the American colonial government gained control of the fort in 1902 and used it their own campaign in Mindanao. Still within the American colonial period, the Philippine Constabulary assumed control of the fort. During the Japanese occupation of the Philippines of World War II the fort was seized by Imperial Japanese forces. The Allied forces regained control of the fort as part of their Eastern Mindanao campaign.

After the war, the fort was used by the Philippine Army and later the Philippine Marines. The marines vacated the facility in 2007.

The fortification was declared as a national landmark, the first in Cotabato province in 2012.

== Heritage designation ==
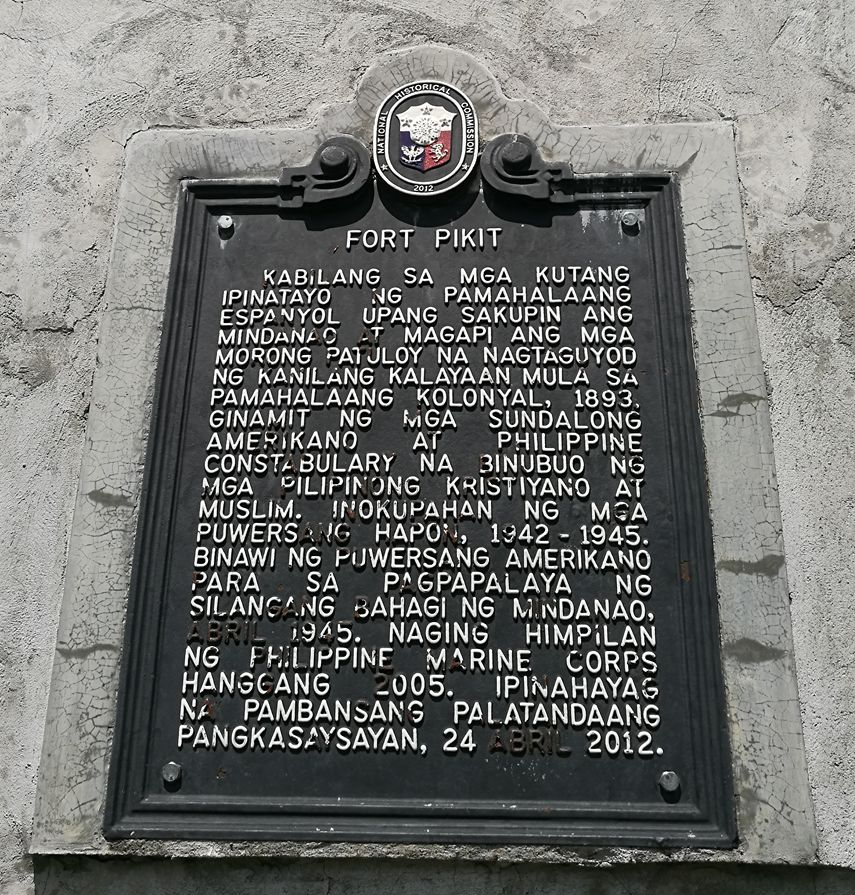
National historical marker installed in 2012

The National Historical Commission of the Philippines (NHCP) designated Fort Pikit as a National Historical Landmark in 2012. Under the administration of Governor Emmylou Taliño-Mendoza, the provincial government of Cotabato worked for at least a year with the municipal government of Pikit under Mayor Sumulong Sultan for the designation. The NHCP sent a team to Fort Pikit on March 12, 2012 to conduct validation, investigation of historical facts related to the fortification. The agency declared Fort Pikit as national historical landmark two months later on April 24, 2012.

== See also ==
- Philippines National Historical Landmarks
