= Nabalawag =

Municipality in Cotabato province, Philippines

- Municipality
- Municipality of Nabalawag
- Barangay Hall of Olandang

- Map of Cotabato with Nabalawag highlighted

- Location within Philippines
- Country: Philippines
- Region: Special Geographic Area (Special Geographic Area)
- Province: Cotabato
- Parliamentary district: 1st district
- Founded: April 13, 2024

Government
  - Type: Sangguniang Bayan
  - Mayor: Datu Rhenz Tukuran
  - Vice Mayor: Samurai Lakiman
  - Electorate: 12,714 voters (2025)

Population (2024 census)
  - Total: 25,500
- Time zone: UTC+8 (PST)
- ZIP code: 9410
- PSGC: 1999904000

Nabalawag, officially the Municipality of Nabalawag (Maguindanaon: Inged nu Nabalawag, Jawi: Hiligaynon: Banwa sang Nabalawag; Cebuano: Lungsod sa Nabalawag; Tagalog: Bayan ng Nabalawag), is a municipality in the province of Cotabato, Philippines. The municipality is part of the Bangsamoro Autonomous Region in Muslim Mindanao despite Cotabato being part of Soccsksargen. According to the 2024 census, it had a population of 25,500.

== History ==
When the Bangsamoro was created in 2019 to supplant the Autonomous Region in Muslim Mindanao, 63 barangays in the province of Cotabato were grouped with the newer autonomous region in the second part of the plebiscite held in February 6. The mother municipalities and Cotabato province remained part of Soccsksargen.

By March 2020, these barangays were designated as a Special Geographic Area (SGA) of the Bangsamoro region.

On August 17, 2023, the bills consolidating the SGA barangays into eight municipalities were approved by the Bangsamoro Parliament, The particular bill creating Nabalawag was Bangsamoro Autonomy Act No. 43. The town was originally proposed to be named as Kabalukan.

A plebiscite was held on April 13, 2024, and voters approved all eight bills reconstituting the SGA barangays to eight municipalities including Nabalawag, where 7,442 voted in favor of its creation while 14 voted against. The Bangsamoro regional government will provide P2.5 million in funding for the municipal government until it gets its share of income from the National Tax Allotment. Nabalawag was created from six barangays of Midsayap and a single barangay from Aleosan.

== Geography ==
=== Barangays ===
Nabalawag is politically subdivided into seven barangays. Each barangay consists of puroks while some have sitios.

- Damatulan
- Dungguan
- Kadigasan
- Kadingilan
- Kudarangan
- Nabalawag
- Olangdang

== Demographics ==
Population census of Nabalawag
Year	Pop.	±% p.a.
2024	25,500	—
Source: Philippine Statistics Authority

== Government ==
Officers-in-charge (OIC) was selected by BARMM Chief Minister Murad Ebrahim to fill positions in the municipal government pending regular elections in 2025. The municipality remains under the jurisdiction of the Special Geographic Area pending the creation of a new province.

Anwar Zumbaga Saluwang is the OIC mayor of Nabalawag since July 9, 2024,
