= Kadayangan =

Municipality in Cotabato province, Philippines

Kadayangan كادايڠن
- Municipality
- Municipality of Kadayangan
- Public Market at Brgy. Tumbras

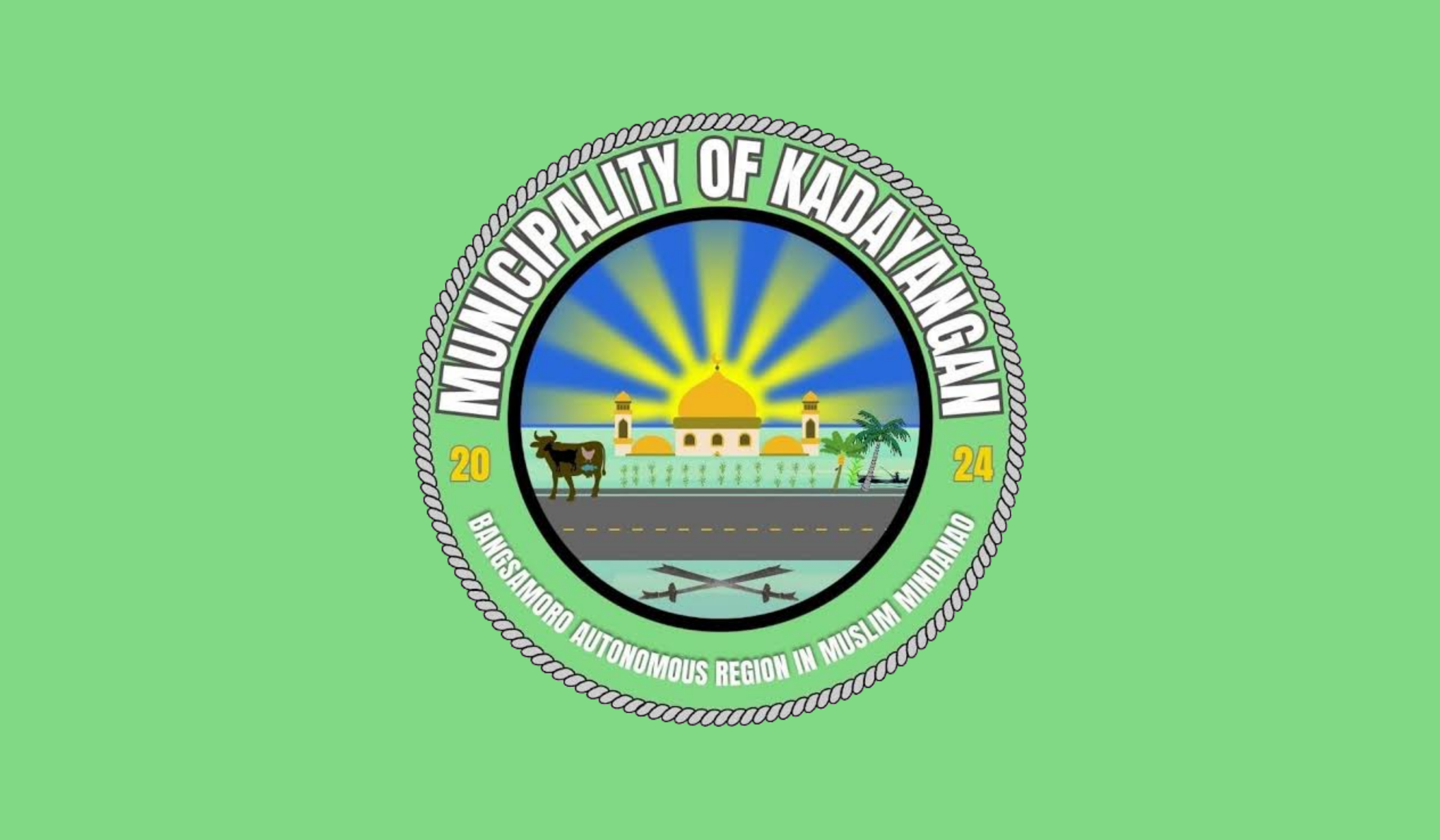
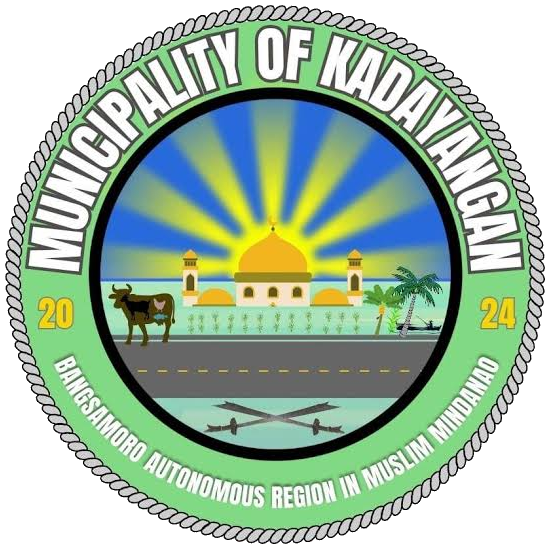
- Flag Seal

- Map of Cotabato with Kadayangan highlighted
- Interactive map of Kadayangan
- Location within Philippines
- Country: Philippines
- Region: Special Geographic Area (Special Geographic Area)
- Province: Cotabato
- Parliamentary district: 1st district
- Founded: April 13, 2024

Government
  - Type: Sangguniang Bayan
  - Mayor: Duma M. Mascud
  - Vice Mayor: Abdulmaula Namil
  - Municipal Council: Members: Michael Kunakon; Kaharudin Dubpaleg; Nasser Dilangalen; Nasser Dalandang; Saida Endaila; Abedin Mandal; Prince Salman Karon; Muslimin Antao
  - Electorate: 11,244 voters (2025)

Population (2024 census)
  - Total: 26,099
- Time zone: UTC+8 (PST)
- ZIP code: 9410
- PSGC: 1999903000

Kadayangan, officially the Municipality of Kadayangan (Maguindanaon: Inged nu Kadayangan; Hiligaynon: Banwa sang Kadayangan; Cebuano: Lungsod sa Kadayangan; Tagalog: Bayan ng Kadayangan), is a municipality in the province of Cotabato, Philippines. The municipality is part of the Bangsamoro Autonomous Region in Muslim Mindanao despite Cotabato being part of Soccsksargen. According to the 2024 census, it had a population of 26,099.

== History ==
When the Bangsamoro was created in 2019 to supplant the Autonomous Region in Muslim Mindanao, 63 barangays in the province of Cotabato were grouped with the newer autonomous region in the second part of the plebiscite held in February 6. The mother municipalities and Cotabato province remained part of Soccsksargen.

On October 23, 2019, a clash between government forces and suspected members of the ISIL-affiliated Bangsamoro Islamic Freedom Fighters (BIFF) in Barangay Tumbras left 7 people dead.

By March 2020, these barangays were designated as a Special Geographic Area (SGA) of the Bangsamoro region.

On August 17, 2023, the bills consolidating the SGA barangays into eight municipalities were approved by the Bangsamoro Parliament, The particular bill creating Kadayangan was Bangsamoro Autonomy Act No. 42.

A plebiscite was held on April 13, 2024, and voters approved all eight bills reconstituting the SGA barangays to eight municipalities including Kadayangan, where 6,292 voted in favor of its creation while 80 voted against. The Bangsamoro regional government will provide P2.5 million in funding for the municipal government until it gets its share of income from the National Tax Allotment. Kadayangan was created from seven barangays of Midsayap.

== Geography ==
=== Barangays ===
Kadayangan is politically subdivided into seven barangays. Each barangay consists of puroks while some have sitios.

- Central Labas
- Kapinpilan
- Malingao
- Mudseng
- Sambulawan
- Tugal
- Tumbras

== Demographics ==
Population census of Kadayangan
| Year | Pop. | ±% p.a. |
|---|---|---|
| 2024 | 26,099 | — |
Source: Philippine Statistics Authority

== Government ==
Officers-in-charge (OIC) was selected by BARMM Chief Minister Murad Ebrahim to fill positions in the municipal government pending regular elections in 2025. The municipality remains under the jurisdiction of the Special Geographic Area pending the creation of a new province.

Duma Madi Mascud is the OIC mayor of Kadayangan since July 9, 2024.
