= Pikit =

Municipality in Cotabato, Philippines

- Municipality
- Municipality of Pikit
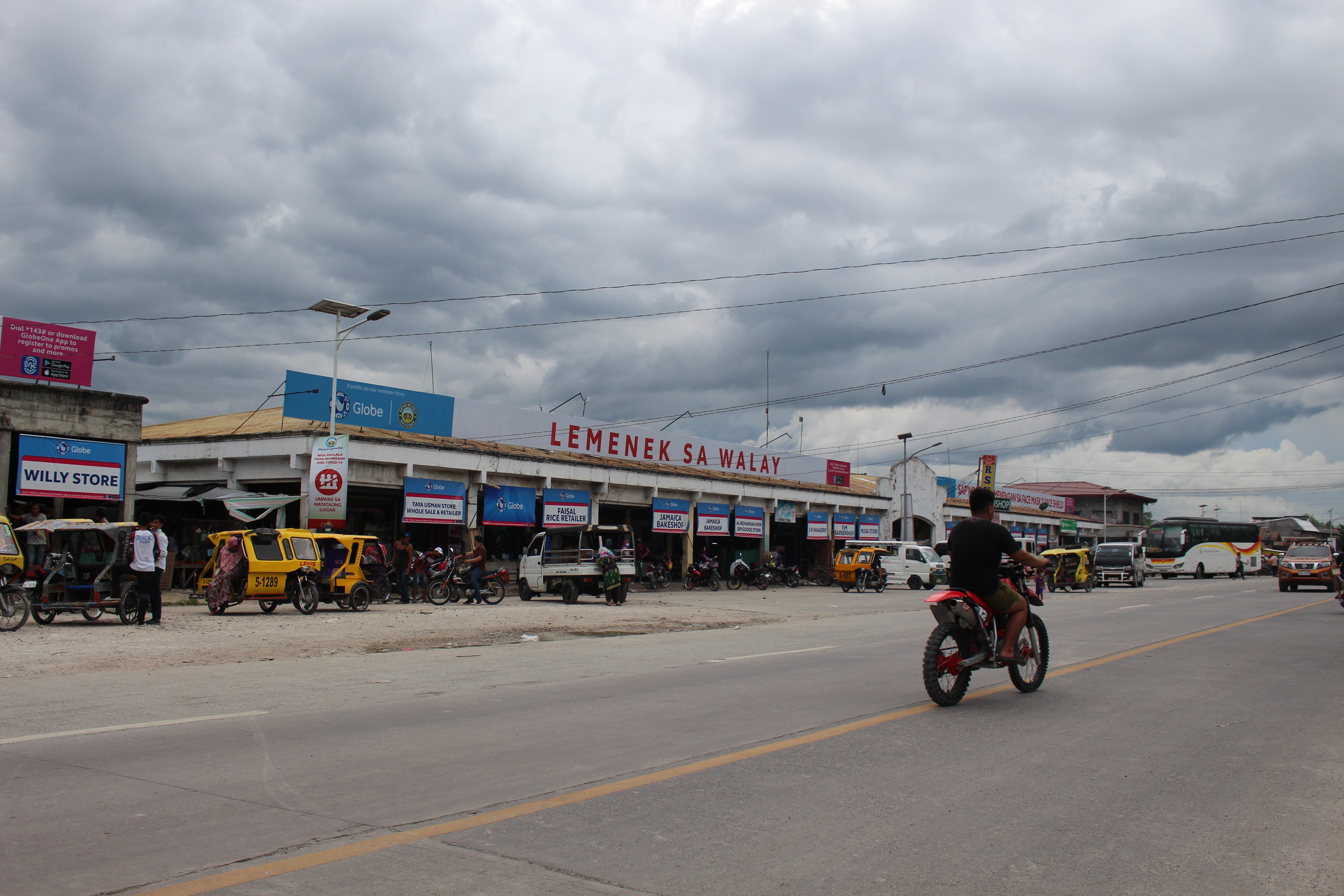
- Pikit Public Market and Terminal

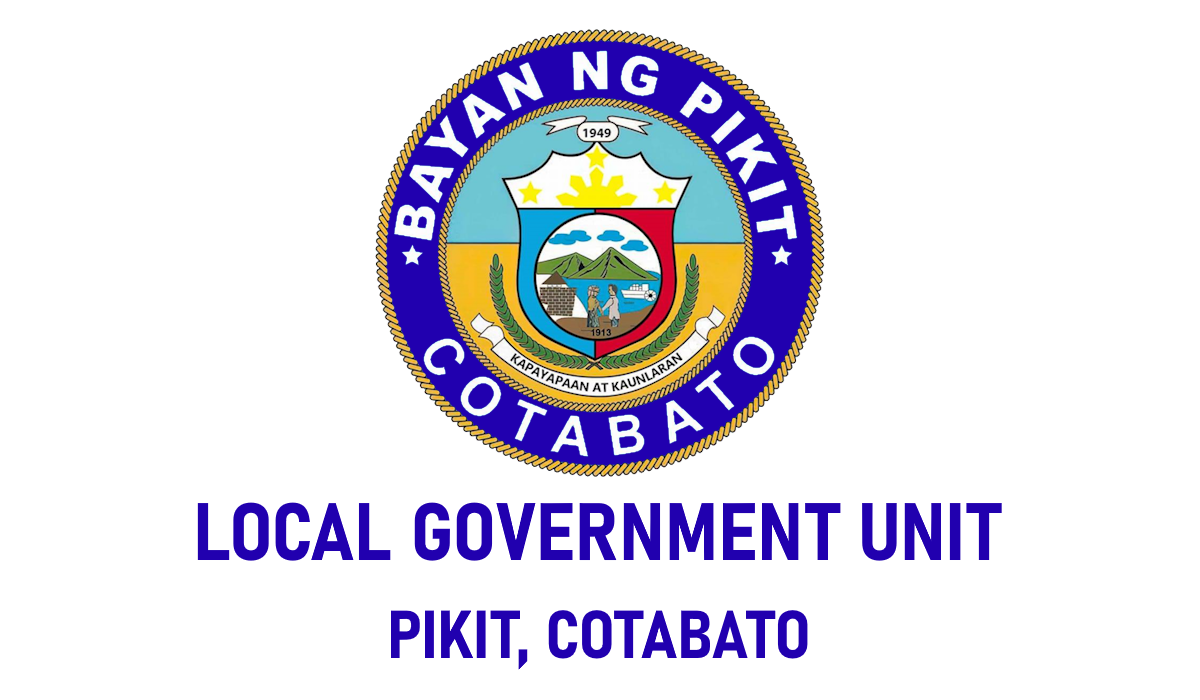
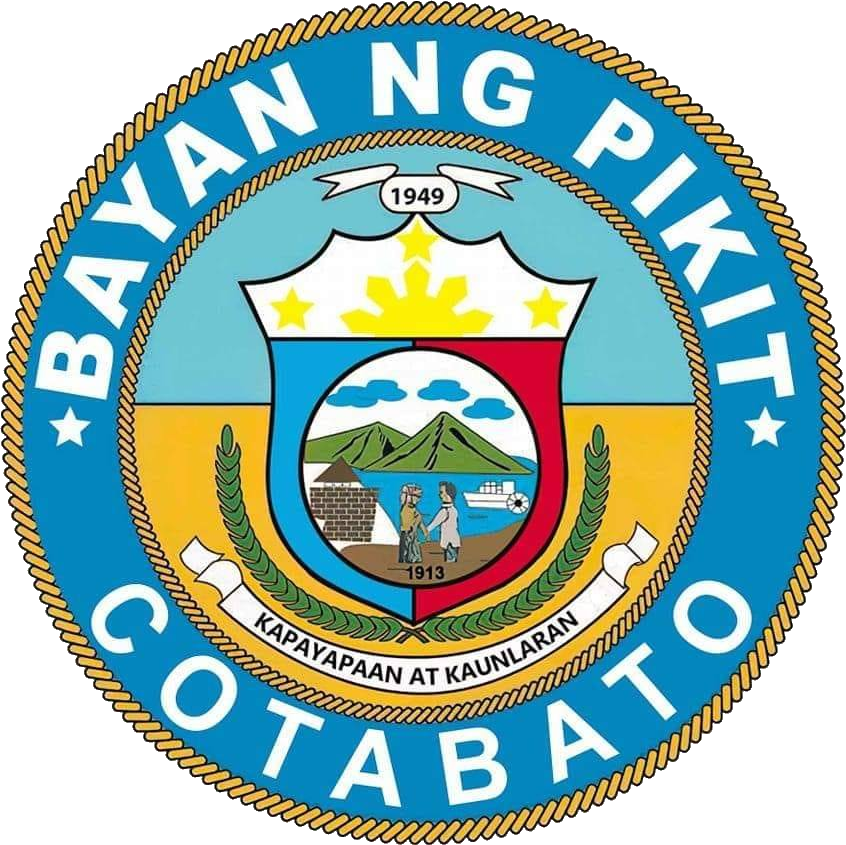
- Flag Seal

- Map of Cotabato with Pikit highlighted
- Interactive map of Pikit
- Location within the Philippines
- Coordinates: 7°03′18″N 124°40′19″E
- Country: Philippines
- Region: Soccsksargen
- Province: Cotabato
- District: 1st district
- Founded: June 17, 1913
- Chartered: September 29, 1949
- Barangays: 42 (see Barangays)

Government
  - Type: Sangguniang Bayan
  - Mayor: Muhyryn D. Sultan-Casi
  - Vice Mayor: Sumulong K. Sultan
  - Representative: Joselito S. Sacdalan
  - Municipal Council: Members: Sitty Nursheena D. Sultan; Al D. Mangansakan; Melhan T. Hamid; Mama G. Kongkong; Datu Turno K. Sultan; Alex A. Dalandag; Jeyrick A. Mangansakan; Perfecto F. Raagas III
  - Electorate: 37,056 voters (2025)

Area
  - Total: 277.269 km^{2} (107.054 sq mi)
- Elevation: 15 m (49 ft)
- Highest elevation: 154 m (505 ft)
- Lowest elevation: 2 m (6.6 ft)

Population (2024 census)
  - Total: 67,220
  - Density: 242.4/km^{2} (627.9/sq mi)
  - Households: 15,718

Economy
  - Income class: 1st municipal income class
  - Poverty incidence: 27.63% (2023)
  - Revenue: ₱ 58.32 million (2024)
  - Assets: ₱ 666.6 million (2024)
  - Expenditure: ₱ 283.2 million (2024)
  - Liabilities: ₱ 115.9 million (2024)

Service provider
  - Electricity: Cotabato Electric Cooperative (COTELCO)
- Time zone: UTC+8 (PST)
- ZIP code: 9409
- PSGC: 1204712000
- IDD : area code: +63 (0)64
- Native languages: Maguindanao; Hiligaynon; Cebuano; Ilianen; Tagalog
- Website: www.pikit-cotabatoprov.gov.ph

Pikit, officially the Municipality of Pikit (Maguindanaon: Inged nu Pikit, Jawi: ايڠد نو ڤيكت; Hiligaynon: Banwa sang Pikit; Cebuano: Lungsod sa Pikit; Tagalog: Bayan ng Pikit) is a municipality in the province of Cotabato, Philippines. According to the 2024 census, it has a population of 67,220 people.

== History ==
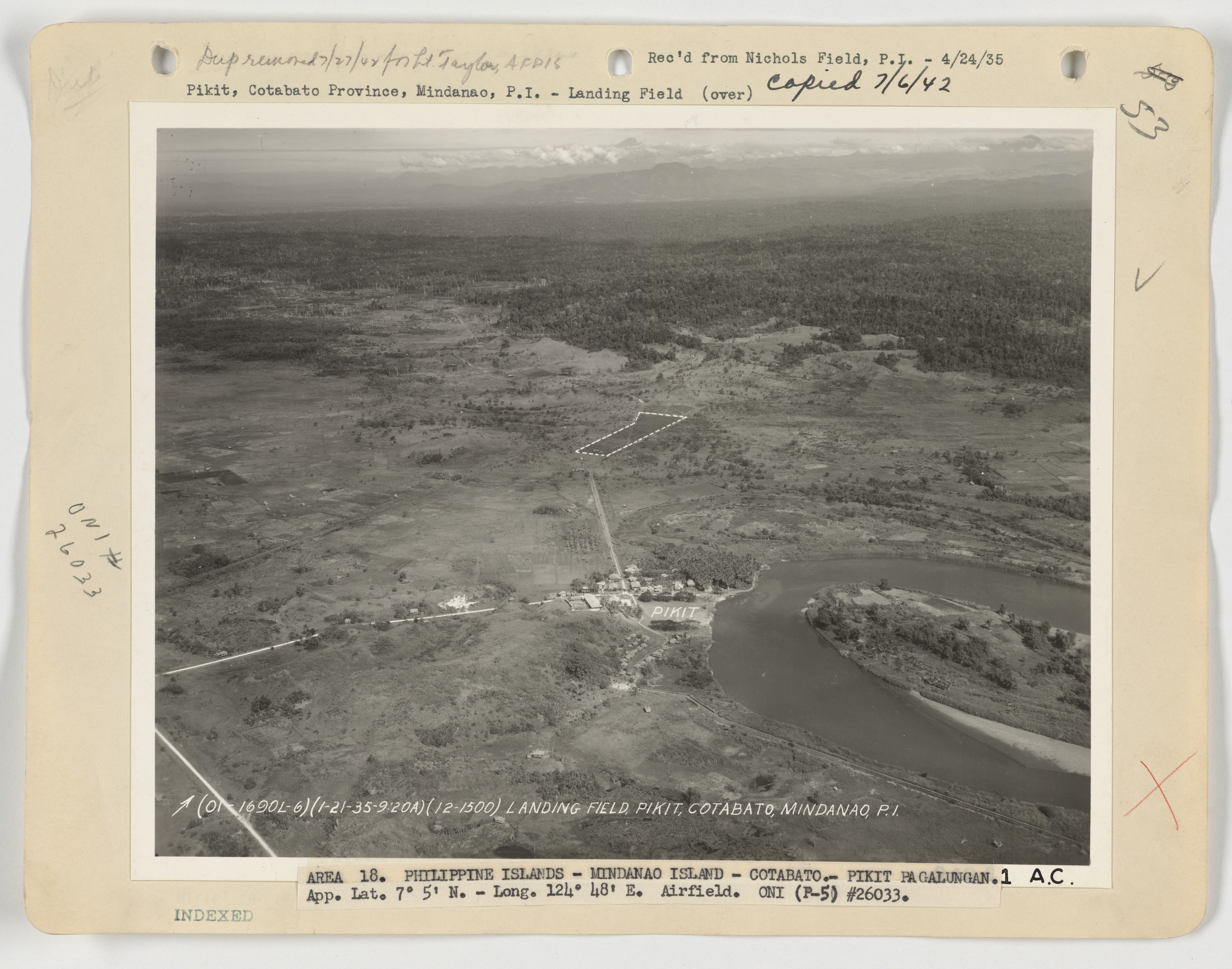
Aerial view of Pikit, 1935

Pikit was the oldest settlement ever founded in Cotabato province. The landmark which eventually became the town's namesake, Fort Pikit, was established in 1893 by the Spaniards who have by then just recently conquered what is now the province of Cotabato from the Sultanate of Maguindanao. The name "Pikit" was given to the place by the Spaniards. It was formerly called by the natives "Malasiquit" because it was situated within the shadows of hills situated to each other. The fort was built to consolidate their hold in the region.

The Spaniards abandoned Fort Pikit at the end of the 19th century, which paved the way for the eventual American occupation in 1902.

Under the Osmeña Colony Act of 1912, Pikit was founded on June 17, 1913, by the first Christian Filipino colonists from the Province of Cebu. About one hundred twenty Cebuanos came under the Colony Agent, Vicente Lozada. The first batch of colonists from Cebu arrived at Fort Pikit after two days of sailing on board a river boat called "Hall", followed the Rio Grande de Mindanao.

The Rio Grande where the colonists landed is now a corn field. It became dry land due to the cut-off river found in Kulanguan, Tunggol, Pagalungan, Maguindanao del Sur.

The first batch of colonists were distributed at Ladtingan, Calawag, Ginatilan, Panicupan, Manding and Inug-ug. They belonged to Colony No. 1, while other colonists followed in 1914 up to 1915 and they were assigned in the following colonies, Colony No. 2 (Paidu Pulangi) Colony no. 3 (Silik) Colony No. 4 (Makasendeg) Colony No. 5 (Pagalungan) and Colony No.7 (Talitay).

Those who came in 1918 from the Visayas and Luzon were called homeseekers, immigrants, and settlers because the government did not give them anymore free transportation and ration in their coming.

During the Colony days the Colonies had a special government under the administration of the Colony Superintendent; Mr. Maximo Abad was then appointed. Mr. Miguel Jacosalem, Asst. Supt. for Colony No. 3, Datu Abdula Piang, Asst. Supt. for Colony No. 3, Mr. Tuan Afdal, Asst. Supt. for Colony No. 4, Mr. Ruperto Gemarino, Asst. Supt. for Colony No. 5 and Mr. Primo Curo, Astt. Supt. for Colony No. 7.

Schools were opened in the Colonies. The first school opened was Ladtingan which James E. McCall was assigned as Supervisor. The first teachers were Frucosa Lucero and Ponciana Lucero.

In 1924, the colonists began to fight for the townsite and local autonomy, for the creation of Pikit into a regular municipality.

In 1928, the Colony Administration was turned over to the Bureau of Lands. Pikit was created a Municipal District, including the new municipality of Pagalungan.

In 1935, the construction of the Cotabato-Davao national Highway helped enhance the progress of this town. This road passes through the heart of Pikit. It afforded a faster and more convenient means of transportation and shipment of farm products.

In the early part of 1947 this Municipal District was created into a regular municipality, as the Municipality of Pagalungan and Pikit as a barrio, Mr. Gorgonio P. Initan was the first appointed mayor who was also the first elected mayor because this year was also the election of the municipal officials. The seat of Government was in Pagalungan.

On May 9, 1948, the Barrio Planning Personnel accompanied by Atty. Sergio F. Tocao, came to Pikit. This marked the triumph of the colonists for the establishment of Manding as a townsite.

In September 29, 1949, Pikit was created a regular municipality by Executive Proclamation with Manding as the seat of the municipal government. This ended the struggle of the colonists and marked the fulfillment of their aspirations. Pikit was created out of the municipality of Pagalungan.

Pikit was proclaimed into a regular municipality thru the efforts of then Congressman Gumbay Piang

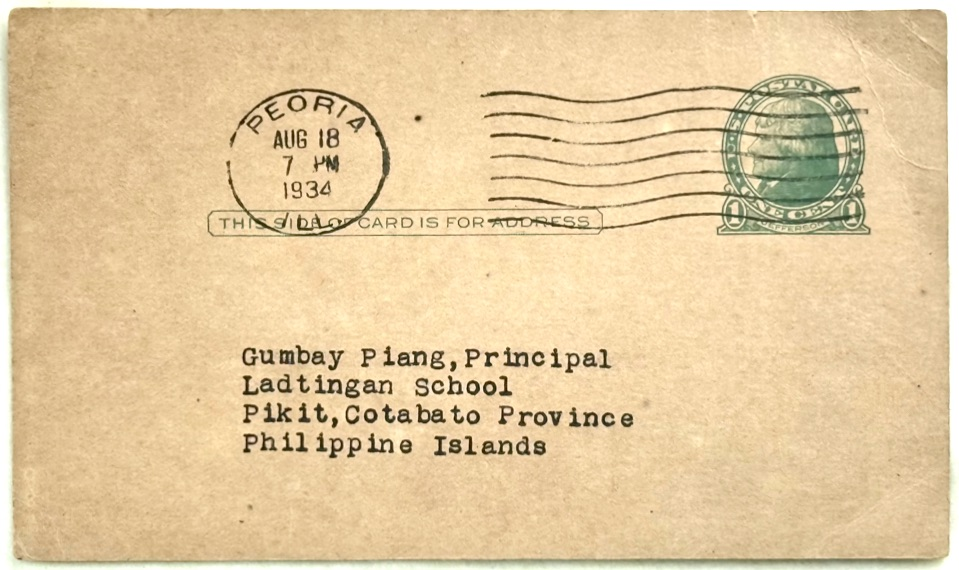

and Governor Duma Sinsuat by virtue of Executive Order No. 270 with its townsite at Manding.

The territory was reduced when, through Batas Pambansa Blg. 206 of 1982, 19 barangays were separated to create the municipality of Aleosan.

The so-called Pikit War between Muslim separatists and the Philippines army took place there in early 2003.

=== Partial inclusion to the Bangsamoro ===
In 2019, twenty-two barangays were among the 63 in the province which became part of the Special Geographic Area of the newly created Bangsamoro, after having the affirmative vote won to join the autonomous region in a plebiscite held on February 6. Ten of these, with Balatican, were among the 39 barangays in the province that unsuccessfully voted for the inclusion in the Autonomous Region in Muslim Mindanao in 2001; the other twelve petitioned to be part of the Bangsamoro, which replaced ARMM by virtue of Republic Act No. 11054.

In 2023, the Bangsamoro Parliament approved the creation of eight new municipalities in the area. Those barangays became part of municipalities of Malidegao (Bangsamoro Autonomy Act No. 46) and Ligawasan (BAA No. 48)—which will be composed of seven in each, and Tugunan (BAA No. 47)—to be composed of eight along with Tapodoc in Aleosan; following ratification in a plebiscite on April 13, 2024.

== Geography ==
The municipality is bounded on the north by the Municipality of Aleosan, on the south by Pagalungan, on the west by the Municipality of Midsayap and the Liguasan marsh and on the east by the Municipality of Datu Montawal.

=== Barangays ===
Pikit is politically subdivided into 20 barangays. Each barangay consists of puroks while some have sitios.

- Balabak
- Balatican
- Bulod
- Calawag
- Dalingaoen (Lalingaon)
- Damalasak
- Ginatilan
- Inug-ug
- Kalacacan
- Katilacan
- Kolambog
- Ladtingan
- Lagunde
- Langayen
- Manaulanan
- Paidu Pulangi
- Poblacion
- Punol
- Silik
- Takepan
- Talitay
- Tinutulan

=== Climate ===
Climate data for Pikit, Cotabato
Month	Jan	Feb	Mar	Apr	May	Jun	Jul	Aug	Sep	Oct	Nov	Dec	Year
Mean daily maximum °C (°F)	32 (90)	32 (90)	33 (91)	33 (91)	32 (90)	31 (88)	30 (86)	31 (88)	31 (88)	31 (88)	31 (88)	31 (88)	32 (89)
Mean daily minimum °C (°F)	21 (70)	21 (70)	21 (70)	22 (72)	23 (73)	23 (73)	23 (73)	23 (73)	23 (73)	23 (73)	23 (73)	22 (72)	22 (72)
Average precipitation mm (inches)	19 (0.7)	14 (0.6)	15 (0.6)	18 (0.7)	33 (1.3)	42 (1.7)	44 (1.7)	42 (1.7)	30 (1.2)	31 (1.2)	28 (1.1)	17 (0.7)	333 (13.2)
Average rainy days	6.9	5.6	6.9	15.2	15.1	17.5	17.8	18.5	14.9	14.9	12.4	8.0	153.7
Source: Meteoblue

== Demographics ==
Population census of Pikit
Year	Pop.	±% p.a.
1960	34,150	—
1970	55,423	+4.96%
1975	45,220	−4.00%
1980	53,804	+3.54%
1990	51,421	−0.45%
1995	57,909	+2.25%
2000	68,455	+3.65%
2007	96,372	+4.83%
2010	113,014	+5.97%
2015	154,441	+6.13%
2020	67,024	−16.11%
2024	67,220	+0.07%
Source: Philippine Statistics Authority; 2020 Census count was revised as per PSA Board Resolution; No. 13 Series of 2021 adopted on November 9, 2021.

In the 2024 census, the population of Pikit was 67,220 people, with a density of 110 inhabitants per square kilometre or 280 inhabitants per square mile.

== Economy ==
Poverty incidence of Pikit (%)

Source: Philippine Statistics Authority

A major producer of corn with area planted of 5,074 hectares and production of 13,310 tons per year. The municipality is also a major producer of coconut and freshwater fish. Coconut meat or copra is made from mature coconut nuts. It is done by splitting the nut and drying the coconut meat by solar drying or by the use of dryers. Upon reaching a moisture content of about 14 to 16%, it is packed in PE sacks of 50 to 60 kg in weight. Copra is the major raw material used in production of refined edible cooking oil and other coconut based products.

As of 2022, the gross domestic product (GDP) of Pikit is ₱17,966,165,354.
