= Tugunan =

Municipality in Cotabato province, Philippines

- Municipality
- Municipality of Tugunan
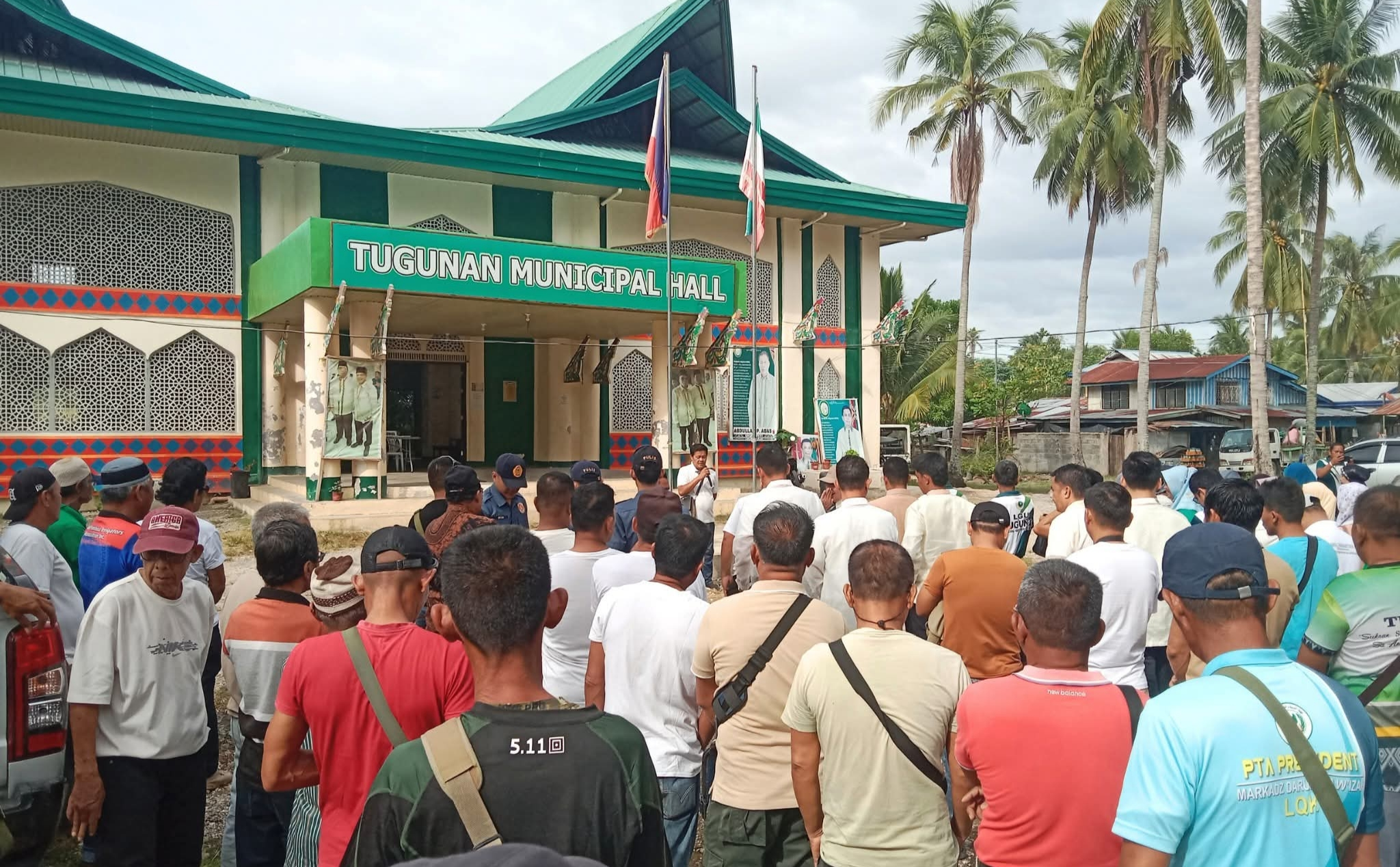
- Tugunan municipal hall

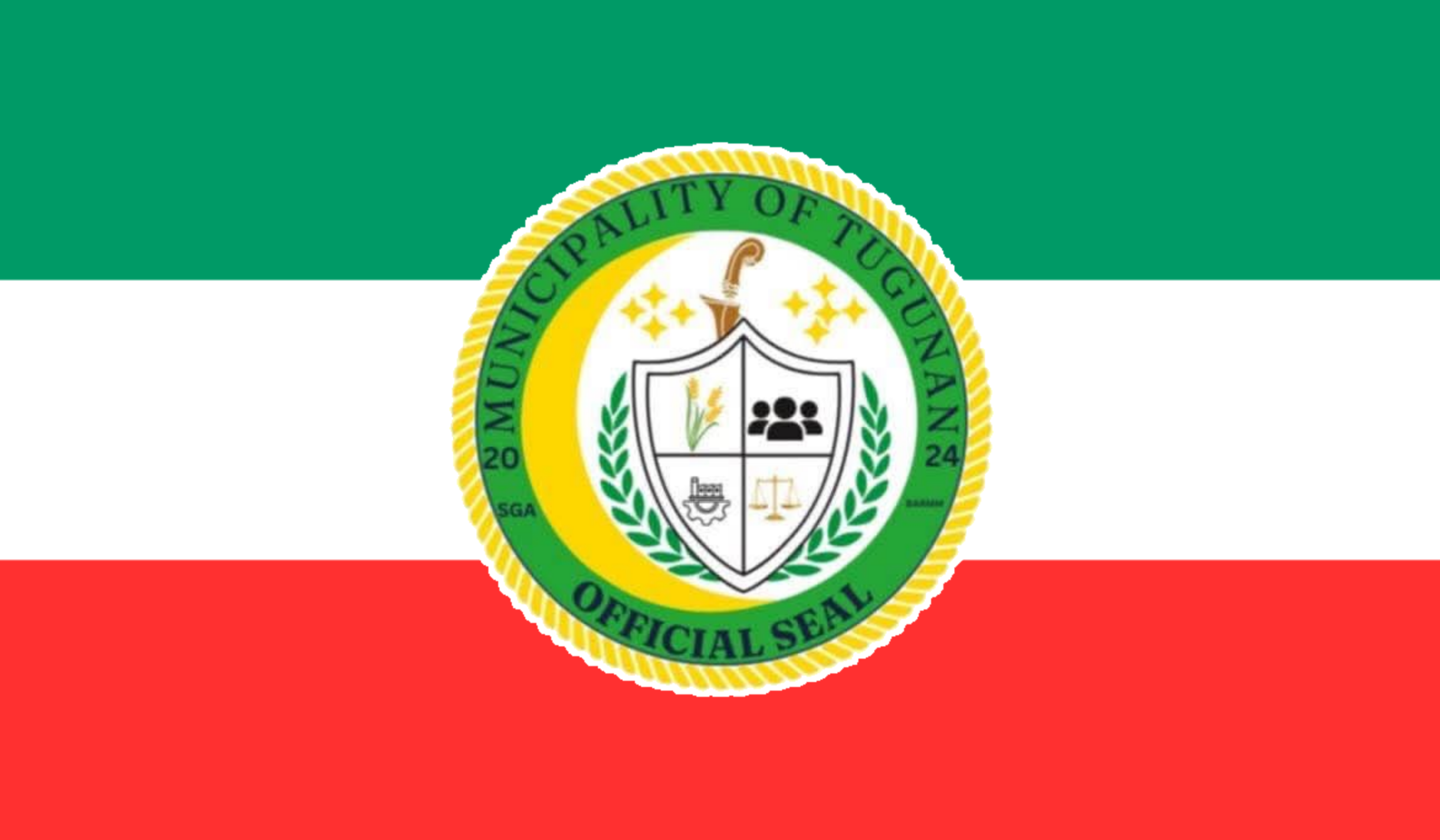
- Flag

- Map of Cotabato with Tugunan highlighted

- Location within Philippines
- Country: Philippines
- Region: Special Geographic Area (Special Geographic Area)
- Province: Cotabato
- Parliamentary district: 1st district
- Founded: April 13, 2024
- Barangays: 9 (see Barangays)

Government
  - Type: Sangguniang Bayan
  - Mayor: Abdullah Pungot Abas
  - Vice Mayor: Suharto Salbo Hashim
  - Electorate: 16,614 voters (2025)

Area
  - Total: 102.60 km^{2} (39.61 sq mi)

Population (2024 census)
  - Total: 33,721
  - Density: 328.66/km^{2} (851.24/sq mi)
- Time zone: UTC+8 (PST)
- ZIP code: 9415
- PSGC: 1999908000

Tugunan, officially the Municipality of Tugunan (Maguindanaon: Inged nu Tugunan, Jawi: ; Hiligaynon: Banwa sang Tugunan; Cebuano: Lungsod sa Tugunan; Tagalog: Bayan ng Tugunan), is a municipality in the province of Cotabato, Philippines. The municipality is part of the Bangsamoro Autonomous Region in Muslim Mindanao despite Cotabato being part of Soccsksargen. According to the 2024 census, it had a population of 33,721.

== History ==
When the Bangsamoro was created in 2019 to supplant the Autonomous Region in Muslim Mindanao, 63 barangays in the province of Cotabato were grouped with the newer autonomous region in the second part of the plebiscite held in February 6. The mother municipalities and Cotabato province remained part of Soccsksargen.

By March 2020, these barangays were designated as a Special Geographic Area (SGA) of the Bangsamoro region.

On August 17, 2023, the bills consolidating the SGA barangays into 8 municipalities were approved by the Bangsamoro Parliament. The particular bill creating Tugunan was Bangsamoro Autonomy Act No. 47.

A plebiscite was held on April 13, 2024, and voters approved all eight bills reconstituting the SGA barangays to eight municipalities, including Tugunan, where 11,501 voted in favor of its creation while 13 voted against. The Bangsamoro regional government will provide P2.5 million in funding for the municipal government until it gets its share of income from the National Tax Allotment. Tugunan was created from eight barangays of Pikit and a single barangay from Aleosan.

== Geography ==
=== Barangays ===
Tugunan is politically subdivided into nine barangays. Each barangay consists of puroks while some have sitios.

- Balong
- Bualan
- Lagunde
- Macatual
- Macasendeg
- Manaulanan
- Pamalian
- Panicupan
- Tapodoc

== Demographics ==
Population census of Tugunan
Year	Pop.	±% p.a.
2024	33,721	—
Source: Philippine Statistics Authority

== Government ==
Officers-in-charge (OIC) was selected by BARMM Chief Minister Murad Ebrahim to fill positions in the municipal government pending regular elections in 2025. The municipality remains under the jurisdiction of the Special Geographic Area pending the creation of a new province.

Abdullah Pungot Abas was the OIC mayor of Tugunan from July 9, 2024 to June 30, 2025.
