= Pahamuddin =

Municipality in Cotabato province, Philippines

- Municipality
- Municipality of Pahamuddin
- Public Market at Brgy. Datu Binasing

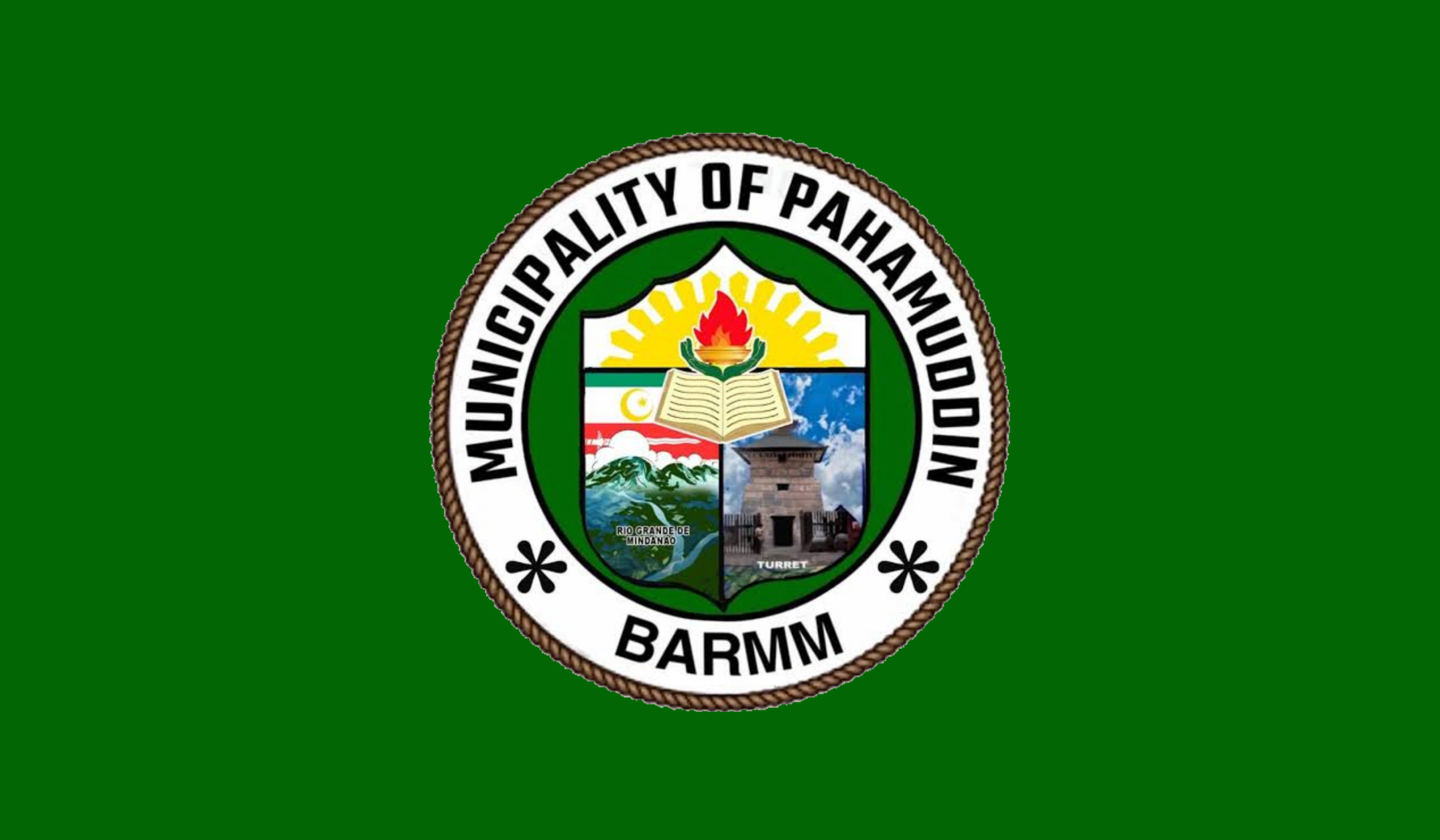
- Flag

- Map of Cotabato with Pahamuddin highlighted

- Location within Philippines
- Country: Philippines
- Region: Special Geographic Area (Special Geographic Area)
- Province: Cotabato
- Parliamentary district: 1st district
- Founded: April 13, 2024
- Barangays: 12 (see Barangays)

Government
  - Type: Sangguniang Bayan
  - Mayor: Yasser Blah Ebrahim
  - Vice Mayor: Datu Ibrahim Lauban Rahman
  - Municipal Council: Members: Raffy B.A. Alhusainie; Baidido M. Zailon; Edres M. Macalaub; Edwin L. Ali; Datu Kulab D. Tuya; Rex T. Maliga; Almorsalin E. Guiafar; Norsando P. Alamada
  - Electorate: 12,659 voters (2025)

Population (2024 census)
  - Total: 19,262
- Time zone: UTC+8 (PST)
- ZIP code: 9412
- PSGC: 1999905000

Pahamuddin, officially the Municipality of Pahamuddin (Maguindanaon: Inged nu Pahamuddin, Jawi: Hiligaynon: Banwa sang Pahamuddin; Cebuano: Lungsod sa Pahamuddin; Tagalog: Bayan ng Pahamuddin), is a municipality in the province of Cotabato, Philippines. The municipality is part of the Bangsamoro Autonomous Region in Muslim Mindanao despite Cotabato being part of Soccsksargen. According to the 2024 census, it had a population of 19,262.

== History ==
When the Bangsamoro was created in 2019 to supplant the Autonomous Region in Muslim Mindanao, 63 barangays in the province of Cotabato were grouped with the newer autonomous region in the second part of the plebiscite held in February 6. The mother municipalities and Cotabato province remained part of Soccsksargen.

By March 2020, these barangays were designated as a Special Geographic Area (SGA) of the Bangsamoro region.

On August 17, 2023, the bills consolidating the SGA barangays into 8 municipalities were approved by the Bangsamoro Parliament, The particular bill creating Pahamuddin was Bangsamoro Autonomy Act No. 41. The municipality's name was originally proposed to be named as Pahamudin, with a single "d".

A plebiscite was held on April 13, 2024, and voters approved all eight bills reconstituting the SGA barangays to eight municipalities including Pahamuddin, where 5,974 voted in favor of its creation while 116 voted against. The Bangsamoro regional government will provide P2.5 million in funding for the municipal government until it gets its share of income from the National Tax Allotment. Pahamuddin was created from 12 barangays of Pigcawayan.

== Geography ==
=== Barangays ===
Pahamuddin is politically subdivided into 12 barangays. Each barangay consists of puroks while some have sitios.

- Balacayon
- Buricain
- Datu Binasing
- Datu Mantil
- Kadingilan
- Libungan Toretta
- Lower Pangangkalan
- Matilac
- Patot
- Upper Pangangkalan
- Lower Baquer
- Simsiman

== Demographics ==
Population census of Pahamuddin
Year	Pop.	±% p.a.
2024	19,262	—
Source: Philippine Statistics Authority

== Government ==
Officers-in-charge (OIC) were selected by BARMM Chief Minister Murad Ebrahim to fill positions in the municipal government pending regular elections in 2025. The municipality remains under the jurisdiction of the Special Geographic Area pending the creation of a new province.

Badrudin Ahmad Ebrahim was the OIC mayor of Pahamuddin from 9 July 2024 to 30 June 2025.

== Transportation ==
Construction began in 2023 for a bridge connecting Pahamuddin with Kabuntalan, Maguindanao del Norte in the contiguous Bangsamoro region.
