= Pigcawayan =

Municipality in Cotabato, Philippines

- Municipality
- Municipality of Pigcawayan
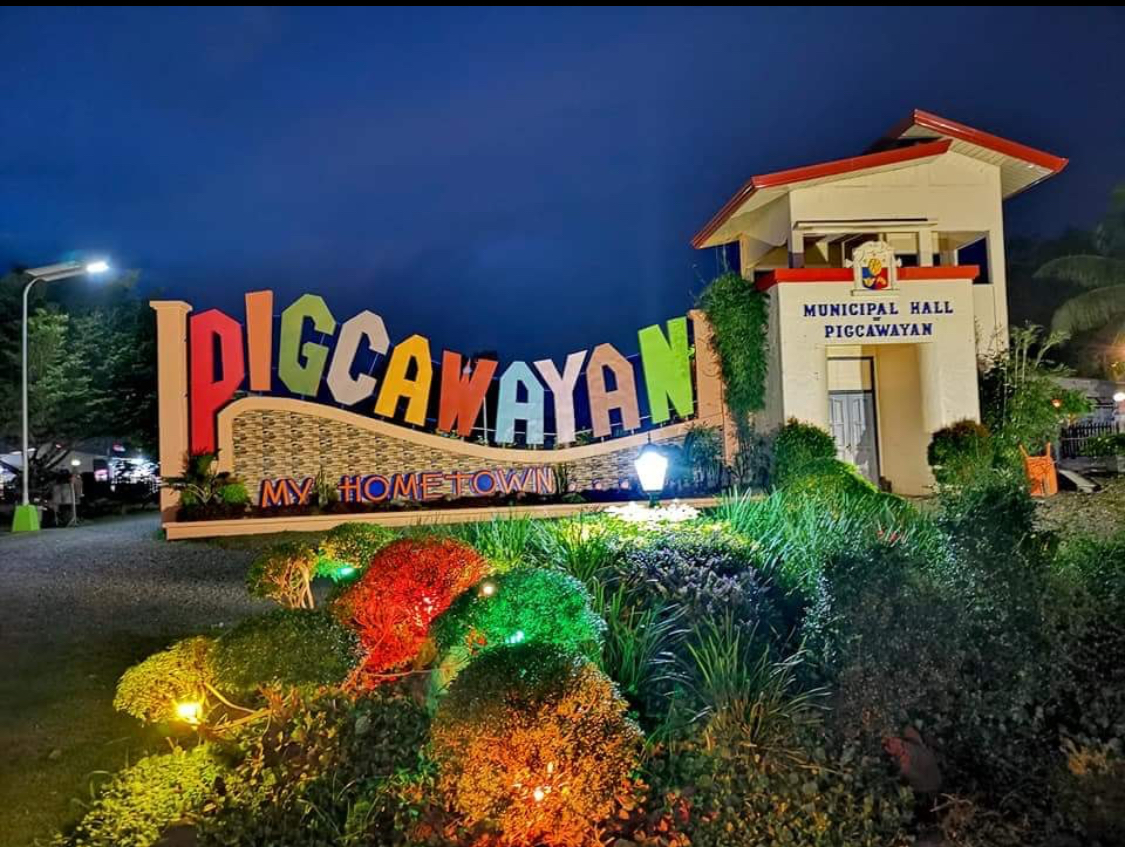
- Pigcawayan Municipal hall

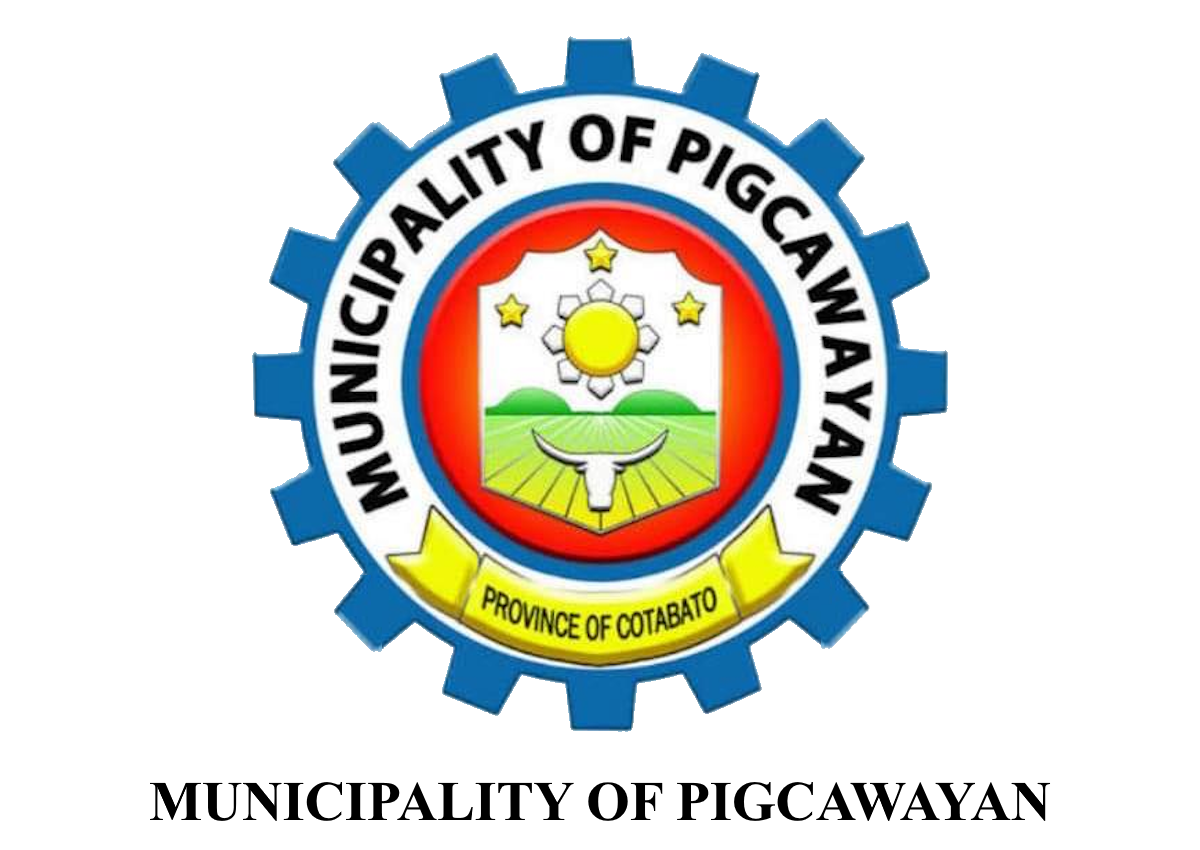
- Flag Seal

- Map of Cotabato with Pigcawayan highlighted
- Interactive map of Pigcawayan
- Location within the Philippines
- Coordinates: 7°16′44″N 124°25′27″E
- Country: Philippines
- Region: Soccsksargen
- Province: Cotabato
- District: 1st district
- Founded: October 20, 1953
- Barangays: 40 (see Barangays)

Government
  - Type: Sangguniang Bayan
  - Mayor: Juanito C. Agustin
  - Vice Mayor: Niel Jake V. Casi
  - Representative: Edwin L. Cruzado
  - Municipal Council: Members: Shadria A. Tejada; Jeremiah Peter N. Dela Calzada; Almyrah D. Pasaquian–Sumalde; Gregorio B. Saljay III; Mariano D. Tenizo Jr.; Renie Jay A. Soriano; Noel G. Egaran; Cirilo P. Gomobar
  - Electorate: 34,445 voters (2025)

Area
  - Total: 289.98 km^{2} (111.96 sq mi)
- Elevation: 35 m (115 ft)
- Highest elevation: 382 m (1,253 ft)
- Lowest elevation: 0 m (0 ft)

Population (2024 census)
  - Total: 53,593
  - Density: 184.82/km^{2} (478.67/sq mi)
  - Households: 13,631

Economy
  - Income class: 1st municipal income class
  - Poverty incidence: 17.56% (2023)
  - Revenue: ₱ 342.5 million (2024)
  - Assets: ₱ 538.1 million (2024)
  - Expenditure: ₱ 291.2 million (2024)
  - Liabilities: ₱ 57.88 million (2024)

Service provider
  - Electricity: Cotabato Electric Cooperative (COTELCO)
- Time zone: UTC+8 (PST)
- ZIP code: 9412
- PSGC: 1204711000
- IDD : area code: +63 (0)64
- Native languages: Maguindanao; Hiligaynon; Cebuano; Iranun; Tagalog
- Website: www.pigcawayan.gov.ph

Pigcawayan, officially the Municipality of Pigcawayan (Maguindanaon: Inged nu Pigkawayan, Jawi: ايڠايد نو ڤيڬكاوين; Iranun: Inged a Pigkawayan, ايڠايد ا ڤيڬكاوين; Hiligaynon: Banwa sang Pigkawayan; Cebuano: Lungsod sa Pigkawayan; Tagalog: Bayan ng Pigkawayan), is a municipality in the province of Cotabato, Philippines. According to the 2024 census, it has a population of 53,593 people.

It is sometimes spelled Pigkawayan.

== History ==
Before its creation as a separate and independent Political Unit, Pigcawayan together with Alamada and Libungan were component barangays of Midsayap. Pigcawayan, however at that time was more progressive than the two mentioned.

How Pigcawayan got its name remains undocumented, however a version were given by the early settlers and passed from one generation to another. Herewith, the place now known as Pigcawayan was a battleground for the Iranuns and the Maguindanaons. Due to this fighting the inhabitants would abandon the place to be occupied by the victors. From this evolved the Maguindanaon word "Pigawaan," which meant an abandoned place.

=== Partial inclusion to the Bangsamoro ===
In 2019, twelve barangays were among the 63 in North Cotabato which became part of the Special Geographic Area of the newly created Bangsamoro, after having the affirmative vote won to join the autonomous region in a plebiscite held on February 6. Eight of them were among the 39 in the province that unsuccessfully voted for the inclusion in the Autonomous Region in Muslim Mindanao in 2001, while the other four were proposed to be part of the Bangsamoro, which replaced ARMM by virtue of Republic Act No. 11054.

In 2023, the Bangsamoro Parliament approved the creation of eight new municipalities in the area. Those barangays were organized into Pahamuddin (Bangsamoro Autonomy Act No. 41) following ratification in a plebiscite on April 13, 2024.

=== Founding anniversary ===
Through Presidential Proclamation 692, October 21, 2024 was declared a special non-working day for the commemoration of the municipality's 71st founding anniversary on October 20, which falls on a Sunday.

== Geography ==
Pigcawayan is the last municipality of Cotabato Province coming from Davao City to Cotabato City. It is 26 kilometres (16 mi) from Cotabato City, 32 kilometres (20 mi) from Cotabato Airport and 30 kilometres (19 mi) from the nearest seaport which is the Polloc Port of Parang, Maguindanao del Norte.

=== Barangays ===
Pigcawayan is politically subdivided into 28 barangays. Each barangay consists of puroks while some have sitios.

- Anick (Upper Balogo)
- Upper Baguer (Baguer)
- Balogo
- Banucagon
- Bulucaon
- Buluan
- Cabpangi
- Capayuran
- Central Panatan
- Kimarayag
- Malagakit
- Maluao
- North Manuangan
- Midpapan I
- Midpapan II
- Mulok
- New Culasi
- New Igbaras
- New Panay
- Payong-payong
- Poblacion I
- Poblacion II
- Poblacion III
- Presbitero
- Renibon
- South Manuangan
- Tigbawan
- Tubon

=== Climate ===
Climate data for Pigcawayan, Cotabato
| Month | Jan | Feb | Mar | Apr | May | Jun | Jul | Aug | Sep | Oct | Nov | Dec | Year |
|---|---|---|---|---|---|---|---|---|---|---|---|---|---|
| Mean daily maximum °C (°F) | 31 (88) | 32 (90) | 32 (90) | 32 (90) | 31 (88) | 30 (86) | 29 (84) | 29 (84) | 30 (86) | 30 (86) | 30 (86) | 31 (88) | 31 (87) |
| Mean daily minimum °C (°F) | 22 (72) | 22 (72) | 23 (73) | 24 (75) | 24 (75) | 24 (75) | 24 (75) | 24 (75) | 24 (75) | 24 (75) | 23 (73) | 22 (72) | 23 (74) |
| Average precipitation mm (inches) | 53 (2.1) | 44 (1.7) | 41 (1.6) | 39 (1.5) | 69 (2.7) | 89 (3.5) | 92 (3.6) | 97 (3.8) | 72 (2.8) | 79 (3.1) | 72 (2.8) | 49 (1.9) | 796 (31.1) |
| Average rainy days | 15.3 | 13.5 | 16.3 | 16.9 | 22.3 | 23.5 | 22.5 | 23.1 | 19.4 | 21.5 | 20.6 | 17.5 | 232.4 |
Source: Meteoblue

== Demographics ==
Population census of Pigcawayan
| Year | Pop. | ±% p.a. |
|---|---|---|
| 1960 | 22,412 | — |
| 1970 | 26,845 | +1.82% |
| 1975 | 24,273 | −2.00% |
| 1980 | 26,475 | +1.75% |
| 1990 | 42,475 | +4.84% |
| 1995 | 46,788 | +1.83% |
| 2000 | 51,008 | +1.87% |
| 2007 | 59,395 | +2.12% |
| 2010 | 59,975 | +0.35% |
| 2015 | 66,796 | +2.07% |
| 2020 | 52,744 | −4.85% |
| 2024 | 53,593 | +0.38% |
Source: Philippine Statistics Authority; 2020 Census count was revised as per PSA Board Resolution; No. 13 Series of 2021 adopted on November 9, 2021.

In the 2024 census, the population of Pigcawayan was 53,593 people, with a density of 160 inhabitants per square kilometre or 410 inhabitants per square mile.

== Economy ==
Poverty incidence of Pigcawayan (%)

Source: Philippine Statistics Authority

The municipality is primarily an agricultural area. Common industrial activities are rice and corn mills. There are rice mills found in Poblacion (2), Tubon (4), North and South Manuangan (2), Upper Baguer (10), Balogo (1), and Capayuran (1). Aside from these, there are also 2 Baby Cono/Kiskisan that can be found in 13 barangays.

Processed milled rice by rice mills are usually exported to Cotabato City, Davao City and in some parts of South Cotabato. Milled rice produced by "Kiskisan/Baby Cono" were usually for households consumption by residents of barangays.

Cottage industries include furniture shops that use wood, bamboo and rattan, as well as rice grinder, mini sawmill and machine shops.

As of 2022, the gross domestic product (GDP) of Pigcawayan is ₱11,036,750,604.

== Tourism ==
Katahum Pigcayawan is the proposed tourism brand of the municipality.

Landmarks:

- Spanish Tower located at Libungan-Torreta, Pigcawayan. It is a historical place.
- Saljay Integrated Farm located at Presbitero, Pigcawayan; farming and agricultural trips.
- The Shrine of Virgin Mary, located at Rogonan, New Panay, Pigcawayan.
- Payong-Payong Cave, located at Payong-Payong, Pigcawayan; caving.
- Bual Spring, located at Kimarayag, Pigcawayan; swimming.
- Payong-Payong Falls located at Auxiliary, Payong-Payong, Pigcawayan. The waterfalls drop from 8–12 meters high with its source coming from a wide river.
- Agustin Swimming Pool Resort located at Tigbawan, Pigcawayan; camping, swimming and picnic sites.
- Kagiringan Falls located at Kimarayag, Pigcawayan; camping and trekking.
- Rapu-Rapu Falls located at Anick, Pigcawayan. The falls drop into a natural round pool called "kawa-kawa" with an estimated 3 meters in diameter.
- Malagakit Lake Resort Malagakit, Pigcawayan. The lake was judged as the cleanest and greenest inland body of water in the Philippines in 1995.
- Lampaki Cave located at Kimarayag, Pigcawayan. The entrance is 3 meters in height with formations of stalactites and stalagmites inside as well as scattered thick guano. There is a small hole on the top through which the rays of the sun pass.
- Kimarayag Cave located at Campo 1, Kimarayag, Pigcawayan. The cave has stalactites and stalagmites formed like a teeth of a whale.
- Belle's Farm & Resort located at Midpapan I, Pigcawayan; swimming, events (weddings, family reunions, birthdays, etc.)

== Notable Personalities ==
- Super Tekla – Actor, Comedian and Television Host
