= Aleosan =

Municipality in Cotabato, Philippines

- Municipality
- Municipality of Aleosan
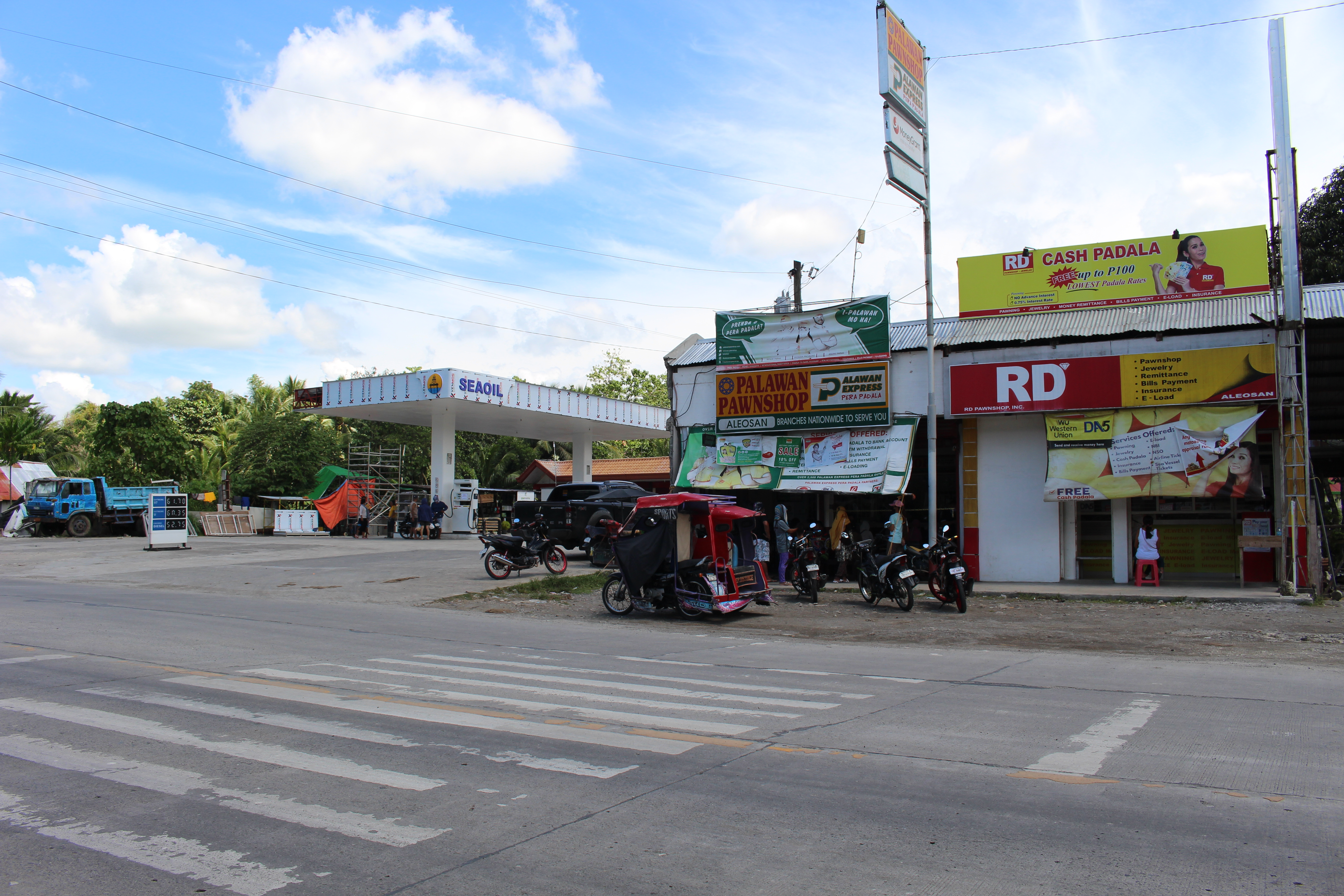
- Portion of Barangay Dualing

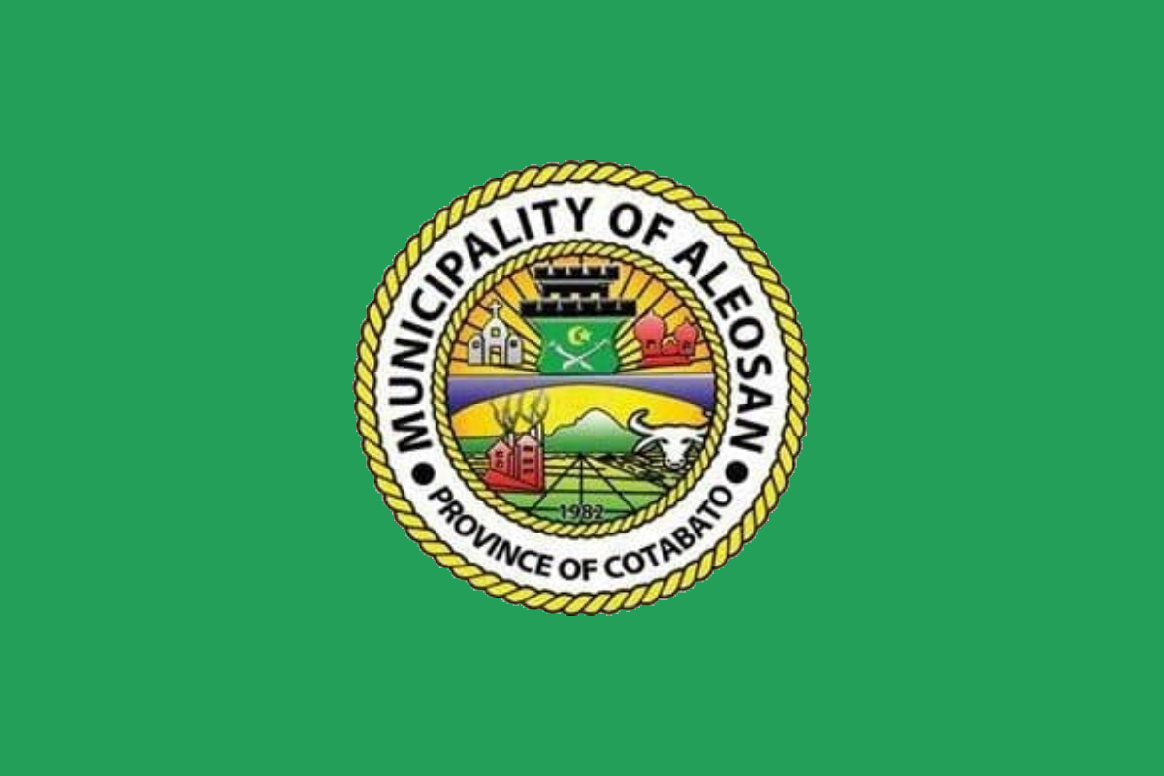
- Flag Seal

- Map of Cotabato with Aleosan highlighted
- Interactive map of Aleosan
- Location within the Philippines
- Coordinates: 7°09′31″N 124°34′32″E
- Country: Philippines
- Region: Soccsksargen
- Province: Cotabato
- District: 1st district
- Founded: April 6, 1982
- Barangays: 19 (see Barangays)

Government
  - Type: Sangguniang Bayan
  - Mayor: Eduardo C. Cabaya
  - Vice Mayor: Felimon C. Cayang, Jr.
  - Representative: Joselito S. Sacdalan
  - Electorate: 23,645 voters (2025)

Area
  - Total: 199.409 km^{2} (76.992 sq mi)
- Elevation: 47 m (154 ft)
- Highest elevation: 208 m (682 ft)
- Lowest elevation: 3 m (9.8 ft)

Population (2024 census)
  - Total: 38,023
  - Density: 190.68/km^{2} (493.85/sq mi)
  - Households: 8,646

Economy
  - Income class: 1st municipal income class
  - Poverty incidence: 27.13% (2023)
  - Revenue: ₱ 202 million (2024)
  - Assets: ₱ 553.2 million (2024)
  - Expenditure: ₱ 80.71 million (2024)
  - Liabilities: ₱ 157.8 million (2024)

Service provider
  - Electricity: Cotabato Electric Cooperative (COTELCO)
- Time zone: UTC+8 (PST)
- ZIP code: 9415
- PSGC: 1204717000
- IDD : area code: +63 (0)64
- Native languages: Hiligaynon; Cebuano; Maguindanao; Ilianen; Tagalog
- Website: www.aleosan.gov.ph

Aleosan, officially the Municipality of Aleosan (Maguindanaon: Inged nu Aleosan, Jawi: ايڠد نو الاوسن; Iranun: Inged a Aleosan, ايڠد ا الاوسن; Hiligaynon: Banwa sang Aleosan; Cebuano: Lungsod sa Aleosan; Tagalog: Bayan ng Aleosan), is a municipality in the province of Cotabato, Philippines. According to the 2024 census, it has a population of 38,023 people.

== History ==
=== Establishment ===
The name Aleosan is an acronym derived from the three municipalities of Iloilo where the majority of the early Christian inhabitants in northern Pikit, its mother municipality, came from: Alimodian, Leon, and San Miguel.

Then assemblyman Jesus P. Amparo authored Parliamentary Bill No. 670, which was also co-authored by assemblymen Blah T. Sinsuat, Ernesto F. Roldan and Tomas B. Baga Jr. The bill sought the establishment of the new municipality which was originally proposed as O. Romualdez. The bill was ultimately approved on March 25, 1982 as Batas Pambansa Blg. 206; a new municipality was organized, separating from Pikit 19 barangays, including San Mateo which would be the seat of government. A plebiscite for ratification, along with ten more newly created local entities, was held on May 17, coinciding with the barangay elections.

=== Partial inclusion to the Bangsamoro ===
In 2019, Dunguan and Tapodoc were among the 63 barangays in the province which became part of the Special Geographic Area of the newly created Bangsamoro, after having the affirmative vote won to join the autonomous region in a plebiscite held on February 6. The two, with Lower Mingading, were among the 39 barangays in the province that unsuccessfully voted for the inclusion in the Autonomous Region in Muslim Mindanao in 2001; with Pagangan, were proposed to be part of the Bangsamoro, which replaced ARMM by virtue of Republic Act No. 11054.

In 2023, the Bangsamoro Parliament approved the creation of eight new municipalities in the area. Dunguan and Tapodoc became part of municipalities of Nabalawag (Bangsamoro Autonomy Act No. 43) and Tugunan (BAA No. 47), respectively, following ratification in a plebiscite on April 13, 2024.

== Geography ==
Aleosan is within the political boundary of Cotabato Province. It is approximately 65 kilometres (40 mi) from the capital town of Amas which is barely two (2) hours ride from the seat of its municipal government. It is bounded on the west by Midsayap; on the northeast by Carmen and on the east and south by its mother Municipality, Pikit. It is accessible to land transportation from Cotabato City traversing the municipalities of Maguindanao to Kidapawan up to Davao City, as it is located along the major transport route linking the provinces of Maguindanao, Cotabato and Davao del Sur.

=== Barangays ===
Aleosan is politically subdivided into 17 barangays. Each barangay consists of puroks while some have sitios.

The seat of the municipal government is in barangay San Mateo.

- Bagolibas
- Cawilihan
- Dualing
- Katalicanan
- Lawili
- Lower Mingading
- Luanan
- Malapang
- New Leon
- New Panay
- Pagangan
- Palacat
- Pentil
- San Mateo (Poblacion)
- Santa Cruz
- Tomado
- Upper Mingading

=== Climate ===
Climate data for Aleosan, Cotabato
Month	Jan	Feb	Mar	Apr	May	Jun	Jul	Aug	Sep	Oct	Nov	Dec	Year
Mean daily maximum °C (°F)	31 (88)	32 (90)	33 (91)	33 (91)	32 (90)	31 (88)	30 (86)	31 (88)	31 (88)	31 (88)	31 (88)	31 (88)	31 (89)
Mean daily minimum °C (°F)	21 (70)	21 (70)	21 (70)	22 (72)	23 (73)	23 (73)	23 (73)	23 (73)	23 (73)	23 (73)	22 (72)	22 (72)	22 (72)
Average precipitation mm (inches)	19 (0.7)	14 (0.6)	15 (0.6)	18 (0.7)	33 (1.3)	42 (1.7)	44 (1.7)	42 (1.7)	30 (1.2)	31 (1.2)	28 (1.1)	17 (0.7)	333 (13.2)
Average rainy days	6.9	5.6	6.9	8.1	15.1	17.5	17.8	18.5	14.9	14.9	12.4	8.0	146.6
Source: Meteoblue

Aleosan area belongs to the fourth type of climate or the intermediate "E" with no distinct dry season. Rainfall is evenly distributed throughout the year with heavier rains from May to September. This type of climate conditions is suitable for the production of crops like rice, corn, mangoes, jackfruit, vegetables and root crops, which are considered seasonal crops and permanent crops like coconut, rubber, coffee, cacao and orchard crops.

== Demographics ==
Population census of Aleosan
Year	Pop.	±% p.a.
1990	22,574	—
1995	25,408	+2.24%
2000	26,164	+0.63%
2007	32,874	+3.20%
2010	35,746	+3.09%
2015	39,405	+1.87%
2020	36,892	−1.38%
2024	38,023	+0.73%
Source: Philippine Statistics Authority; 2020 Census count was revised as per PSA Board Resolution; No. 13 Series of 2021 adopted on November 9, 2021.

In the 2024 census, the population of Aleosan was 38,023 people, with a density of 170 inhabitants per square kilometre or 440 inhabitants per square mile.

== Economy ==
Poverty incidence of Aleosan (%)

Source: Philippine Statistics Authority

The municipality is endowed with abundant agricultural raw materials suitable for processing. These include coconut, banana, rubber, mango and coffee. There are small-scale enterprises but these are not sustainable due to inadequate capital. A cassava processing plant was shut down due to insufficient supply of raw materials and low quality of starch produced. The area however, is best suited for mango production and there is a need to develop the industry to cater the growing needs of the locality. The municipality's livestock industry has great potentials being one of the top producers and supplier of livestock in the province.

As of 2022, the gross domestic product (GDP) of Aleosan is ₱7,143,068,857.

== Tourism ==
- Brgy Malapang – Mountain climbing
- Brgy Pentil – Eco tourism
- Brgy Katalicanan – UK Peak
- Lindungan – Sunset View
