= Cotabato =

Province in Soccsksargen, Philippines

Cotabato North Cotabato
- Province

Other transcription(s)
  - Jawi: اوتار كوتوات
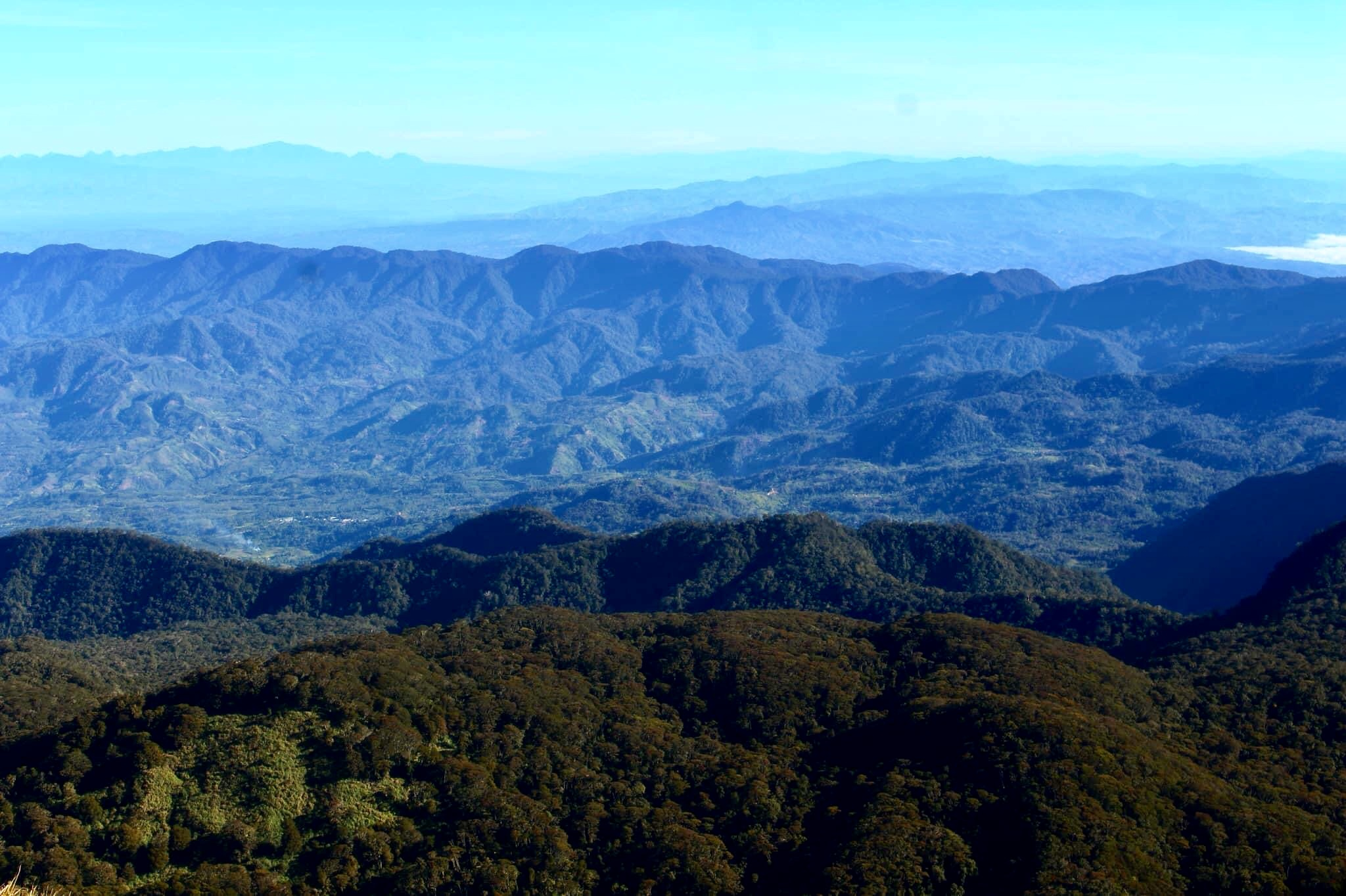
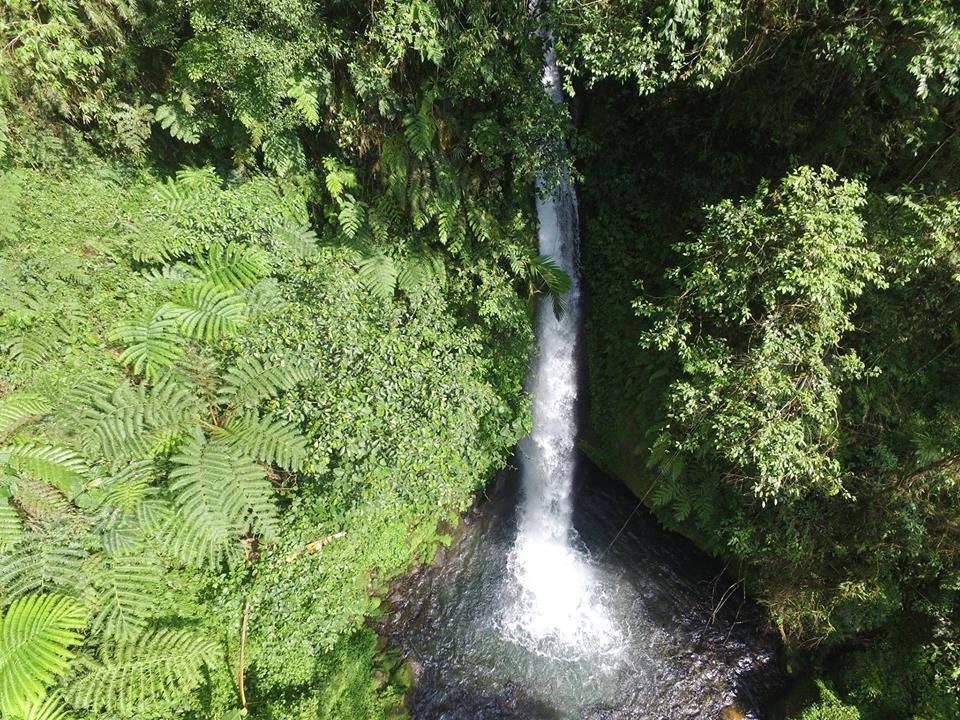
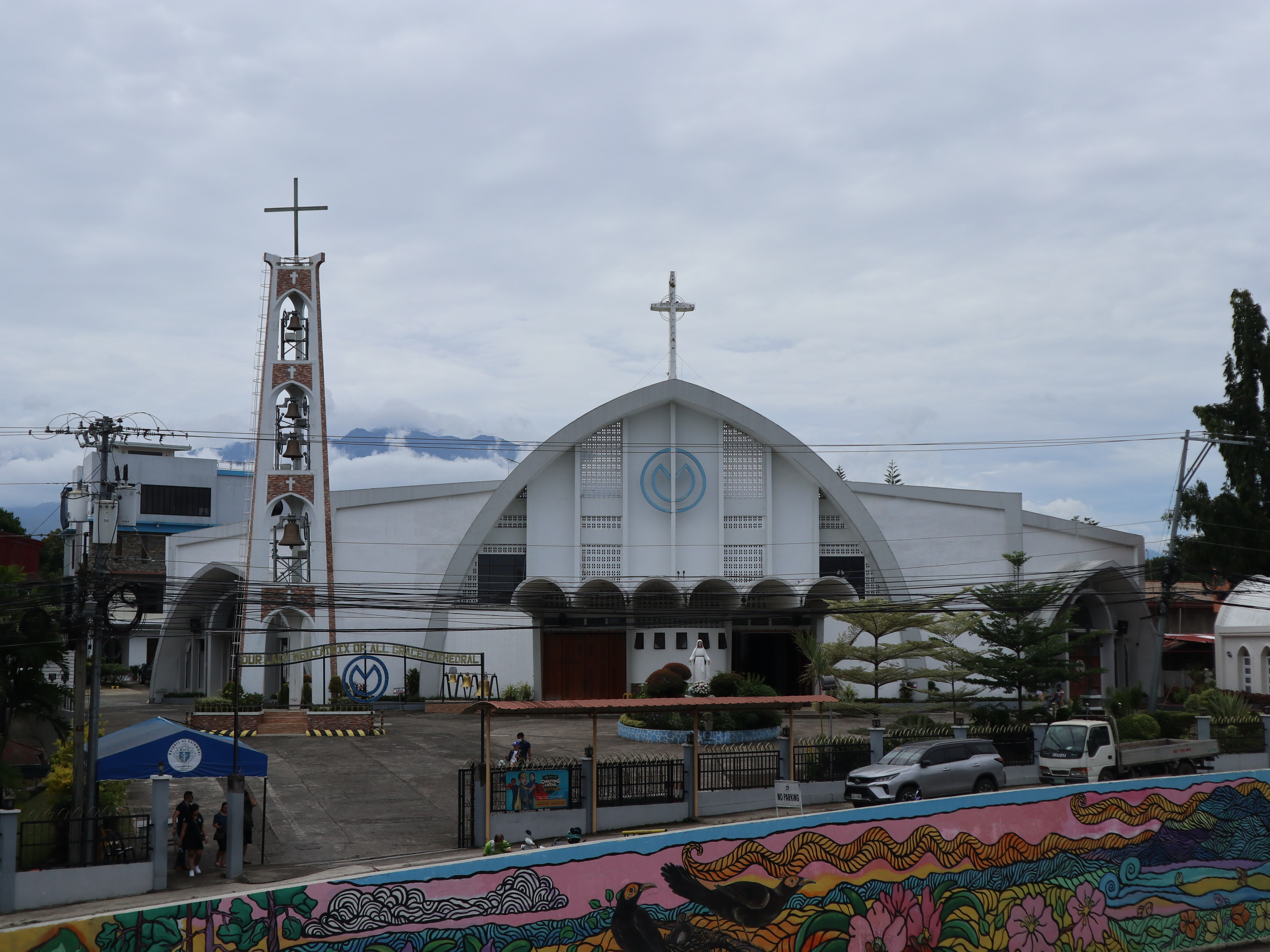
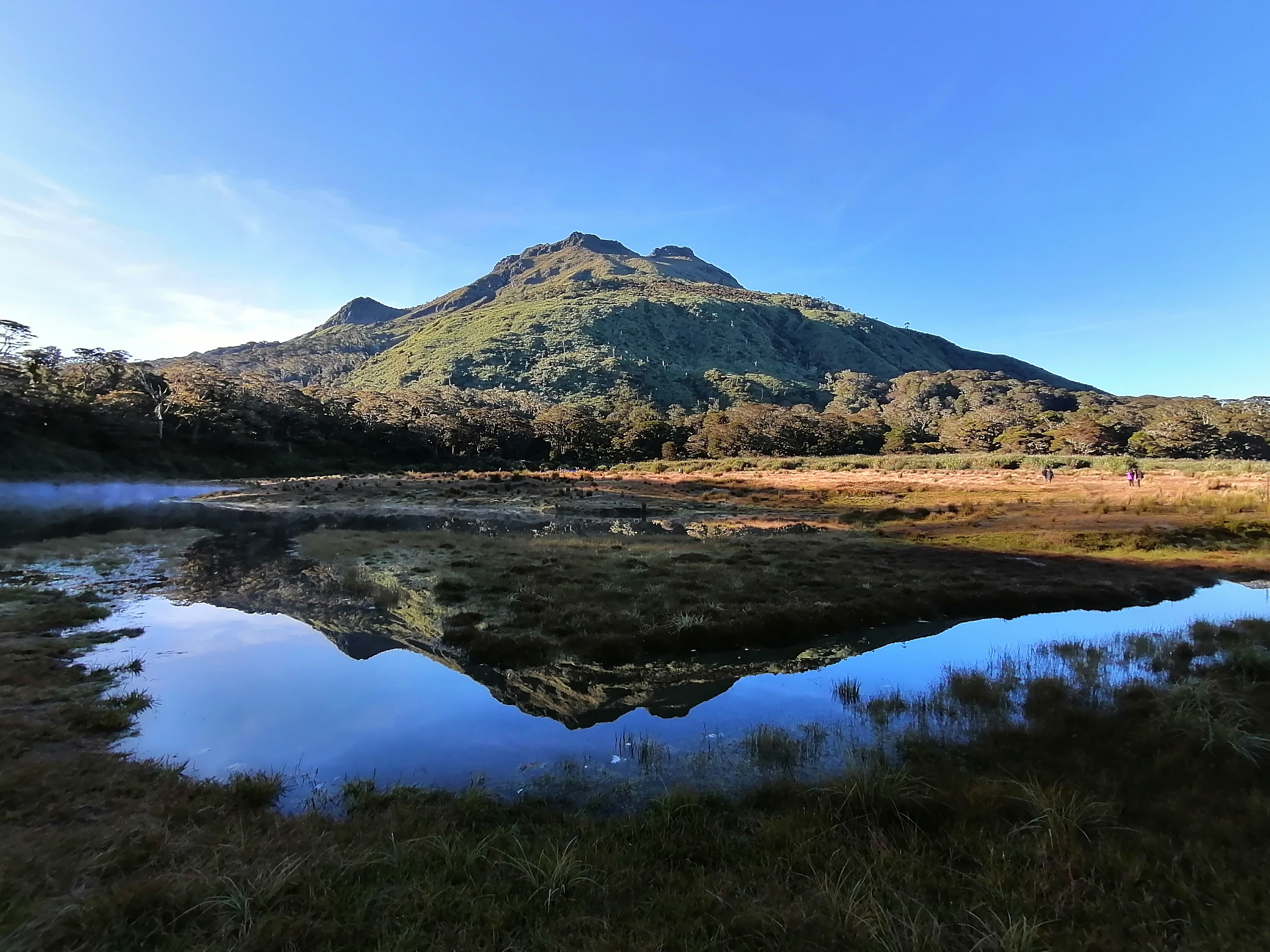
- (from top: left to right) Mount Apo Rainforest, Paniki Falls in Kidapawan, Kidapawan City Hall, Our Lady Mediatrix of All Grace Cathedral, Lake Venado, and Cotabato Provincial Capitol

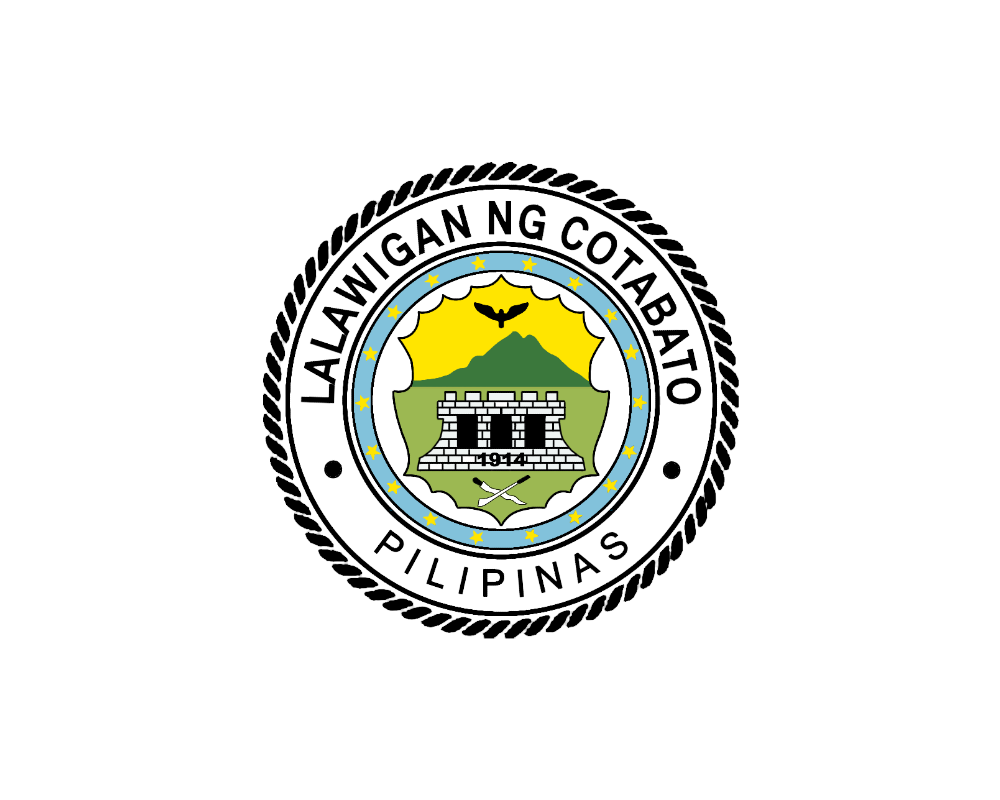
- Flag Seal

- Location in the Philippines
- Interactive map of Cotabato
- Coordinates: 7°12′N 124°51′E
- Country: Philippines
- Region: Soccsksargen; Bangsamoro (Special Geographic Area)
- Foundation: September 1, 1914 (founded as the Empire Province of Cotabato); November 22, 1973 (Maguindanao and Sultan Kudarat were carved out)
- Capital and largest city: Kidapawan

Government
  - Governor: Emmylou T. Mendoza (NP)
  - Vice Governor: Rochella Marie T. Taray (Lakas-CMD)
  - Legislature: Cotabato Provincial Board
  - Electorate: 797,609 voters (2025)

Area
  - Total: 9,008.90 km^{2} (3,478.36 sq mi)
  - Rank: 6th out of 82
- Highest elevation (Mount Apo): 2,954 m (9,692 ft)

Population (2024 census)
  - Total: 1,286,142
  - Rank: 22nd out of 82
  - Density: 142.763/km^{2} (369.756/sq mi)
  - Rank: 57th out of 82
  - Households: 308,443
- Demonym(s): Cotabatnon; Kotabatnon; North Cotabatnon; North Kotabatnon

Divisions
  - Independent cities: 0
  - Component cities: 1: Kidapawan
  - Municipalities: 25: Alamada; Aleosan; Antipas; Arakan; Banisilan; Carmen; Kabacan; Kadayangan; Kapalawan; Libungan; Ligawasan; M'lang; Magpet; Makilala; Malidegao; Matalam; Midsayap; Nabalawag; Old Kaabakan; Pahamuddin; Pigcawayan; Pikit; President Roxas; Tugunan; Tulunan
  - Barangays: 543
  - Districts: Legislative districts of Cotabato

Economy
  - Income class: 1st provincial income class
  - Poverty incidence: 18% (2023)
  - Revenue: ₱ 4,524 million (2024)
  - Assets: ₱ 15,980 million (2024)
  - Expenditure: ₱ 2,696 million (2024)
  - Liabilities: ₱ 834.7 million (2024)
- Time zone: UTC+8 (PST)
- PSGC: 124700000
- IDD : area code: +63 (0)64
- ISO 3166 code: PH-NCO
- Spoken languages: Hiligaynon; Maguindanaon; Cebuano; Chavacano; Iranun; Dulangan Manobo; Obo; Tagabawa; Tboli; Ilianen; Tagalog; English
- Website: cotabatoprov.gov.ph

Cotabato, and also still commonly referred to as North Cotabato (Note: Hiligaynon: Aminhan Cotabato; Maguindanaon: Utara Kutawatu, Jawi: اوتار كوتوات; Cebuano: Amihanang Cotabato; Ilocano: Amianan a Cotabato; Filipino: Hilagang Cotabato) and officially the Province of Cotabato, is a landlocked province in the Philippines primarily located in the Soccsksargen region in Mindanao. Its capital is the city of Kidapawan, the most populous in the province. Some of the barangays in its municipalities are under the jurisdiction of the nearby Bangsamoro Autonomous Region.

== Etymology ==
The name Kuta Watu in Maguindanaon (or Kota Batu in Malay) means "stone fortress".

== History ==
=== Maguindanao Sultanate ===
According to Maguindanao royal records, Islam was introduced to the Maguindanaos in the late 15th century by Sharif Muhammad Kabungsuan, a Johorean Malay Muslim noble and missionary of Arab descent. Sharif Kabungsuan invaded Malabang in 1475, facing armed resistance from the principality, nevertheless successfully vanquishing and subjugating it to his Islamic rule through the employment of Samal forces.

Cotabato became the capital of the Maguindanao Sultanate. The city became the seat of power of Sultan Muhammad Kudarat in 1619.

=== Spanish invasion ===
Christianity was introduced in 1596, but the Spaniards were unable to penetrate into the region until the second half of the 19th century. The district of Cotabato was formed in 1860, covering the areas of what is now Cotabato, Maguindanao del Norte, Maguindanao del Sur, and Sultan Kudarat provinces with its capital at Tamontaka. Fort Pikit was established by the Spaniards in 1893 as they continued their conquest of the remnants of Maguindanao Sultanate, which would soon be the site of one of the province's oldest towns, Pikit.

=== American rule ===
The coming of the Americans ushered in the creation of the Moro Province on July 15, 1903, through Act No. 787 of the Philippine Commission. Cotabato, covering what are now the provinces of Cotabato, Maguindanao del Norte, Maguindanao del Sur, Sultan Kudarat, South Cotabato and Sarangani, became a district of the huge Moro province. During the American period, large companies were established in Cotabato to exploit the vast timber resources of the region. By the 1930s, settlers from Luzon and Visayas established homesteads in Cotabato.

=== Japanese invasion ===
In December 1941, Japanese planes bombed and invaded Cotabato. In 1942, Cotabato was occupied by the Japanese Imperial forces. A military headquarters of the Philippine Commonwealth Army existed in Cotabato from January 3, 1942, to June 30, 1946, and the Philippine Constabulary 10th Constabulary Regiment was stationed in Cotobato from October 28, 1944, to June 30, 1946. Moro guerrilla fighters operating in the province of Cotabato helped local forces of the Philippine Commonwealth Army and the Philippine Constabulary 10th Constabulary Regiment fight against the Imperial Japanese Army until 1944. The Moro guerrillas fought the Japanese troops until liberation. In 1945, Cotabato was recaptured from the Japanese Imperial forces by the combined Filipino and American troops together with the recognized Moro guerrilla units. The guerrillas used the traditional Moro Kampilan, Barong and Kris swords as their weapons.

=== Postwar era ===
The pace of settlement in the region accelerated in the 1950s and 1960s. The former province of Cotabato was once the largest in the Philippines. In 1966, South Cotabato was created as a separate province.

Mindanao, including Cotabato, was relatively peaceful in the 1950s and the mid-1960s. While there were some ethnic tensions, there was essentially no presence of secessionist groups in Mindanao yet.

=== Martial law era ===
The relative peace of the postwar era began to change in the last years of President Ferdinand Marcos' first term, when news about the Jabidah massacre ignited a furor in the Moro community, and ethnic tensions encouraged with the formation of secessionist movements. None of these groups had enough followers to form a viable opposition until Marcos declared martial law, but when political parties were dissolved upon the proclamation of martial law in September 1972, it became easy for the armed secessionist group known as the Moro National Liberation Front to consolidate power, and the decades-long Moro conflict began in earnest.

One major event of martial law which took place in Cotabato was the Manili massacre, which saw the mass murder of 70 to 79 Moros, including women and children, committed in a mosque in Manili, Carmen on June 19, 1971. The Muslim residents of the town had gathered in their mosque to participate in a supposed peace talk with Christian groups when a group of armed men suspected to be part of the Ilaga militant group opened fire on them.

On November 22, 1973, through Presidential Decree No. 341, what remained of the old Cotabato was further divided into the provinces of North Cotabato, Maguindanao, and Sultan Kudarat. North Cotabato was later renamed Cotabato through Batas Pambansa Blg. 660 approved on March 7, 1984.

=== Contemporary history ===
By the aftermath of the plebiscite to form the autonomous administrative region of Bangsamoro in February 2019, 63 barangays from Cotabato's western municipalities, all of which inhabited mostly by Muslim natives, opted to join the newly formed region. This will result in the reduction of the number of barangays the province currently administers after the national midterm elections on May 13, 2019. Cotabato now comprises the capital city of Kidapawan and 25 municipalities.

In September 2017, Representative Roger Mercado authorized House Bill 6408, proposing to change the name of the provinces to Cotabato del Norte.

== Geography ==
Cotabato covers a total area of 9,008.90 square kilometres (3,478.36 sq mi) occupying the northeastern tip of Region XII and is centrally located in Mindanao. It is bounded on the north by the provinces of Lanao del Sur and Bukidnon, on the east by Davao City and Davao del Norte, on the west by Maguindanao del Norte and Maguindanao del Sur, on the south by Sultan Kudarat, and on the southeast by Davao del Sur.

Cotabato is strategically linked to the major "Arterial Road System" that traverses and connects the province to Davao City - Soccsksargen - Cotabato Corridor. The Cotabato via Kabacan - Maramag - Kibawe, Bukidnon Sayre Highway meanwhile serves as its link to the Cagayan de Oro-Iligan City Corridor.

Cotabato stretches from the east at Mount Apo, which separates it from Davao, to the Piapayungan Range on its boundary with Lanao in the west. Between these highlands is the basin of the Pulangi River or Rio Grande de Mindanao, the second longest in the Philippines at 373 kilometres (232 mi), which rises in Bukidnon and flows westward to Maguindanao del Norte and Illana Bay. The province's fertile plains are traversed by tributaries of this great river.

Typhoons do not pass through Cotabato and rainfall is evenly distributed throughout the year.

Climate data for Cotabato
Month	Jan	Feb	Mar	Apr	May	Jun	Jul	Aug	Sep	Oct	Nov	Dec	Year
Mean daily maximum °C (°F)	30.5 (86.9)	31.0 (87.8)	32.0 (89.6)	32.8 (91.0)	32.2 (90.0)	31.8 (89.2)	31.3 (88.3)	31.5 (88.7)	31.8 (89.2)	32.3 (90.1)	31.8 (89.2)	31.3 (88.3)	31.7 (89.0)
Mean daily minimum °C (°F)	23.7 (74.7)	23.9 (75.0)	24.1 (75.4)	24.7 (76.5)	24.8 (76.6)	24.6 (76.3)	24.4 (75.9)	24.5 (76.1)	24.4 (75.9)	24.4 (75.9)	24.4 (75.9)	24.2 (75.6)	24.3 (75.8)
Average rainy days	15	11	13	11	15	17	15	14	13	15	15	13	167
Source: Storm247

== Administrative divisions ==
Political map of Cotabato

Cotabato comprises 25 municipalities and one city. However, 8 municipalities are under the jurisdiction of Bangsamoro as part of its special geographic area.

- † Provincial capital and component city
- Municipality, part of Bangsamoro's special geographic area (Note: The municipalities of Kadayangan, Kapalawan, Ligawasan, Malidegao, Nabalawag, Old Kaabakan, Pahamuddin and Tugunan are under the administration of Bangsamoro as part of its special geographic area despite being geographically grouped under the province of Cotabato.)
- Municipality

City or municipality	District	Population (2020)	Area (km^{2})	No. of barangay(s)	Coordinates^{[A]}
Alamada	1st	68,659	787.50	17	7°23′24″N 124°32′59″E
Aleosan	1st	36,892	199.409	17	7°09′08″N 124°34′53″E
Antipas	2nd	26,817	552.50	13	7°14′42″N 125°03′14″E
Arakan	2nd	50,558	693.22	28	7°21′05″N 125°07′34″E
Banisilan	3rd	46,995	577.22	20	7°30′21″N 124°41′41″E
Carmen	3rd	79,140	929.81	21	7°12′16″N 124°47′43″E
Kabacan	3rd	77,164	448.09	17	7°07′00″N 124°49′00″E
Kadayangan	—	25,573	41.60	7	7°07′23″N 124°28′34″E
Kapalawan	—	28,643	180.62	7	7°15′38″N 124°47′21″E
Kidapawan City ^{†}	2nd	160,791	358.47	40	7°00′30″N 125°05′30″E
Libungan	1st	56,269	172.50	20	7°14′25″N 124°31′11″E
Ligawasan	—	29,784	111.60	7	6°59′42″N 124°42′18″E
Magpet	2nd	53,800	755.36	32	7°06′08″N 125°07′28″E
Makilala	2nd	87,927	343.57	38	6°57′41″N 125°05′09″E
Malidegao	—	36,438	115.45	7	7°10′27″N 124°41′26″E
Matalam	3rd	81,355	476.00	34	6°57′41″N 125°05′09″E
Midsayap	1st	117,365	186.47	44	7°11′21″N 124°32′06″E
M'lang	3rd	98,195	312.13	37	6°56′47″N 124°52′42″E
Nabalawag	—	28,239	86.05	7	7°05′55″N 124°29′36″E
Old Kaabakan	—	16,658	117.17	7	7°09′51″N 124°50′44″E
Pahamuddin	—	19,627	50.13	12	7°10′06″N 124°21′52″E
Pigcawayan	1st	52,744	289.98	28	7°16′45″N 124°25′27″E
Pikit	1st	67,024	277.27	20	7°03′13″N 124°40′20″E
President Roxas	2nd	52,512	618.25	25	7°09′15″N 125°03′19″E
Tugunan	—	30,651	102.60	9	7°02′25″N 124°36′44″E
Tulunan	3rd	60,978	343.08	29	6°49′50″N 124°52′22″E
Total		1,275,185	9,008.90	543	

=== Reduction due to the establishment of the Bangsamoro ===
During the 2001 Referendum for inclusion to the Autonomous Region in Muslim Mindanao, 2 out of 28 barangays of Carmen, Cotabato chose to be part of ARMM, but were excluded because they were not connected to the main region of ARMM. During 2010-2016 Administration, the Bangsamoro ideal sprouted and a newly proposed region was in the making. According to the agreements signed by the Moro Islamic Liberation Front and the Administration of Noynoy Aquino, Carmen will be included in Bangsamoro because of the two out of twenty-eight barangays that voted in favor of joining the Muslim region back in 2001. Unfortunately, Bangsamoro was not implemented before the term of Aquino ended. Despite this, the current administration aims to establish a Federal Government, where Bangamoro will be realized into a State of the Philippines wherein Carmen will be included in Bangsamoro.

Plans to establish a new municipality in the south of Carmen so that the indigenous and Christian central and northern part of Carmen will be retained in Cotabato have yet to be confirmed. The idea arose because once the entire municipality of Carmen is included in Bangsamoro, the province of Cotabato will be cut into half, leaving three towns (Banisilan, Alamada, and Libungan) at its west without connection to the center of Cotabato, isolating these towns in the process.

The issue was partially resolved when the second part of the plebiscite was conducted on February 6, 2019, when 63 barangay from the towns of Pigkawayan, Libungan, Midsayap, Aleosan, Carmen, Banisilan and Pikit opted to join the new administrative autonomous region of Bangsamoro after the results of the region's formation plebiscite were confirmed three days later on February 9. These barangays are to join either the adjacent province of Maguindanao as parts of the said province's nearby and respective municipalities or to cluster on their own as new municipalities within the said province after the national midterm elections on May 13, 2019. The size and population of Cotabato province had officially diminished on November 20, 2019, as the barangays which voted to join the Bangsamoro made their exit from the province and their respective mother municipalities and were officially turned over to the Bangsamoro government as an interim province within the autonomous region divided into several clusters.

== Demographics ==
Population census of Cotabato
Year	Pop.	±% p.a.
1903	3,988	—
1918	16,165	+9.78%
1939	50,012	+5.53%
1948	87,236	+6.38%
1960	279,478	+10.19%
1970	468,354	+5.29%
1975	472,302	+0.17%
1980	564,599	+3.63%
1990	763,995	+3.07%
1995	862,666	+2.30%
2000	958,643	+2.29%
2007	1,121,974	+2.19%
2010	1,226,508	+3.29%
2015	1,379,747	+2.27%
2020	1,275,185	−1.65%
2024	1,286,142	+0.21%
Source: Philippine Statistics Authority; 2020 Census count was revised as per PSA Board Resolution; No. 13 Series of 2021 adopted on November 9, 2021.

Spoken languages in Cotabato
Languages	percentage
Hiligaynon	46%
Maguindanao	38%
Cebuano	8%
Ilocano	4%

Based on the 2024 census, Cotabato has an overall population of 1,286,142. The average population growth rate was 2.27% in the period 2010–2015, which is higher than the national average of 1.72%. The province had a density of 140 inhabitants per square kilometre or 360 inhabitants per square mile.

Cotabato is an ethnolinguistically diverse province. The first Visayan settlers reached the town of Pikit in 1913, and since then, Christian migrants have moved and lived in Cotabato, cohabitating in the province with the local indigenous groups. 71% of Cotabato's population descended from settlers who migrated from the Visayas and Luzon, while the remaining 18% belong to the communities of Magindanaons, Iranuns, Ilianens, Dulangan Manobo, Obo, Tagabawa, and Tboli. The major languages spoken are Hiligaynon (46%), Maguindanao (38%), Cebuano (8%), and Ilocano (4%).

=== Religion ===
Religion in Cotabato (2020) (Note: Excludes 63 barangays under the Special Geographic Area)
Religion	percentage
Catholic	52.77%
Islam	19.32%
Southern Baptist Church	3.73%
Iglesia ni Cristo	2.2%
Others	21.98%

==== Catholicism ====
Cotabato's population is predominantly Catholic. According to the 2020 census, 52.77% of the population are Roman Catholic.

==== Islam ====
As of 2020, Muslims represent close to 20% of the population.

==== Others ====
The other significant minorities are Evangelical Christians at 8.4% of the population, Southern Baptist Church with 3.7% of the population, and Iglesia Ni Cristo which forms 2.2% of the province population.

== Economy ==
Poverty incidence of Cotabato (%)

Source: Philippine Statistics Authority

Cotabato is considered a major food basket in Mindanao. It is a top producer of cereals, tropical fruits, vegetables, sugarcane, coconut, coffee, freshwater fish and livestock.

It is also one of the country's leading producers of raw and semi-processed rubber and industrial trees, with markets in Asia and Europe.

Among its major natural assets are Mt. Apo, the country's highest peak at 9,692 feet (2,954 m) above sea level, the Pulangi River which is a major contributor to Mindanao's irrigation system and hydro-electric energy, and the vast Liguasan Marsh which not only supplies a bounty of freshwater fish and organic fertilizer but considered as a possible source as well of natural gas.

Power utility in the province comes from two energy sources - the NAPOCOR Agus Grid in Iligan transmitted through its Tacurong Substations and the Mount Apo Geothermal Power Plant at the foot of Mt. Apo in Ilomavis, Kidapawan City which produces 97 megawatts of electricity. Power distribution is handled by Cotabato Electric Cooperative, Inc. (COTELCO).

The province has a 4,131.32-kilometre (2,567.08 mi) road network connecting the major centers to each other and the outlying barangays, and communication linkage through NDD-IDD, fax, cellular phone and the internet is available.

== Government ==
President Benigno Aquino III signed the law dividing to three new legislative districts of Cotabato on September 14, 2012. The representative shall continue to serve until the next national election.

=== Elected provincial officials ===
- House of Representatives
1. 1st District — Rep. Joselito S. Sacdalan
2. 2nd District — Rep. Rudy Caodagan
3. 3rd District — Rep. Maria Alana Samantha Talino Santos
- Governor: Emmylou "Lala" Talino-Mendoza
- Vice governor: Efren Pinol

== Notable people ==
- Erwin Emata, mountaineer, runner
- Mary Jean Lastimosa, actress, model, and Miss Universe Philippines 2014, reaching the Top 10 in Miss Universe 2014
- Emmanuel Piñol, chairman of Mindanao Development Authority, 2019–2021; secretary of Agriculture, 2016–2019; governor of Cotabato, 1998–2007
- Super Tekla, Actor, comedian and television host
