= List of capitals outside the territories they serve =

There are many cases where a subnational administrative division (a federated state, municipality, or other unit) is governed from a capital city that is not itself a part of that territory. In most of these cases, the city itself is constituted as a separate local government unit, but also administers a surrounding or neighbouring territory.

== Current ==
=== Africa ===
- Ethiopia: Addis Ababa, capital of the region of Oromia (in addition to being the national capital city), itself an independently governed chartered city that is not part of Oromia. Adama, located within the Oromia region, served as its capital between 2000 and 2005.
- South Africa:
  - East London, the administrative centre of the Amathole District Municipality, itself in the Buffalo City Metropolitan Municipality
  - Gqeberha, the administrative centre of the Cacadu District Municipality, itself in the Nelson Mandela Bay Metropolitan Municipality

=== Americas ===
- Bogotá, Colombia – capital of the surrounding Cundinamarca Department, while constituting its own capital district.
- Hot Springs, South Dakota, United States – seat of Fall River County, whose administration is under contract from neighbouring Oglala Lakota County to also perform the latter's administrative functions.
- King Salmon, Alaska, United States – seat of government for the Lake and Peninsula Borough but lies in the Bristol Bay Borough.
- Alberta, Canada - More than half of Alberta's 63 municipal districts are administered from a separate municipality, often an incorporated city, town, or village surrounded by, but administratively-separate from, the municipal district itself.
- London, Ontario, Canada - seat of Middlesex County, itself an independent city.
- Ontario, Canada - since the municipal restructuring of the 1990s, many of the remaining two-tier counties are administered from separated municipalities that are no longer included within the county; for example, the seat of Wellington County is in Guelph.
- Paramaribo, Suriname – the vast and sparsely populated Sipaliwini District in the South of the country does not have a capital, and is administered from a distance directly by the central government, in the national capital city of Paramaribo on the coast. Paramaribo does not even border the Sipaliwini District.
- Recife, Brazil – seat of the administration of the Fernando de Noronha islands. The Atlantic archipelago of Fernando de Noronha is a unique case in Brazil of a state district, not part of any municipality and administered directly by the government of the state of Pernambuco. The islands' administrative offices are located in the state capital city of Recife, on the mainland, 540 kilometres (340 mi) away from the islands.
- Thessalon, Ontario, Canada – seat of Cockburn Island township, itself a separate municipality on the mainland. Cockburn Island, in Lake Huron, has no longer any permanent population, yet it is still legally incorporated as a township of the province of Ontario, with the administrative offices located in Thessalon.
- Virginia in the United States – has unique laws regarding independent city status, where a city is not part of its surrounding county. Because of this, many county courthouses and county government offices are technically located outside of the county. These include Albemarle County, Alleghany County, Frederick County, Greensville County, Prince William County, Rockbridge County, and Rockingham County. The government offices for Roanoke County, James City County, and Henrico County are located within the borders of the county while the historic courthouses are located in the independent cities of Salem, Williamsburg, and Richmond, respectively. In Fairfax County, the courthouse is situated in an enclave within the city of Fairfax, which is an independent city that is itself an enclave within Fairfax County. This is a rare example of a counter-enclave. The county's government offices are outside of the City of Fairfax's borders.
- Winner, South Dakota, United States – seat of both Tripp and Todd counties, itself located in Tripp County.

=== Asia ===
- Bishkek, Kyrgyzstan – capital of Chüy Region which surrounds the city, though the city itself is not part of the region but rather a region-level unit of Kyrgyzstan
- Central, Hong Kong – the area where the district council and district office of the Islands District is located, itself within the Central and Western District
- Chandigarh, India – shared capital of the states of Punjab and Haryana, itself a union territory
- Fort Pikit, Malidegao, Philippines – the barangay which serves as the site of the municipal hall of Pikit in Cotabato province. The barangay was previously part of Pikit, until the creation of Malidegao in 2024.
- Ishigaki, Japan – government seat both of the Yaeyama District of Okinawa Prefecture, and of the town of Taketomi, located in that district. Ishigaki itself is a city, outside any district and with its own separate administration.
- Jiagedaqi District, China – administrative centre of the Da Hinggan Ling Prefecture, Heilongjiang Province, itself (nominally) located in Inner Mongolia.
- Kagoshima, Japan – hosts the municipal offices for the island villages of Mishima and Toshima.
- Lankaran, Azerbaijan – capital of Lankaran Rayon, itself administratively separate
- Several provinces of the Philippines technically have their capitals outside their borders when the cities are classified as highly urbanized (independent); by law these cities are not included in any province, although most of the time these cities are tightly connected and were sometimes once part of the province that surrounds them. See cities of the Philippines for a more extensive explanation and the Virginia entry above for a comparison.
- Saipan, Northern Mariana Islands – seat of the mayor office of the largely evacuated Northern Islands Municipality, itself another municipality
- Shaki, Azerbaijan – capital of Shaki Rayon, itself administratively separate
- Shusha, Azerbaijan – capital of Shusha Rayon, itself administratively separate
- Tashkent, Uzbekistan – capital of Tashkent Province, itself an independent city
- Yevlakh, Azerbaijan – capital of Yevlakh Rayon, itself administratively separate
- Ongjin County, Incheon - County office located in Michuhol District because county is composed entirely of islands.

=== Europe ===
- Austria:
  - Most of the so-called Statutarstädte (statutory cities), which are independent cities not part of any district, are the seats of their surrounding districts. The statutory cities for which this is the case are:
    - Eisenstadt,
    - Graz,
    - Innsbruck,
    - Klagenfurt am Wörthersee,
    - Krems an der Donau,
    - Linz, the city of Linz is the seat of two districts, Linz-Land and Urfahr-Umgebung, the latter of which used to have its seat at the town of Urfahr, which became a borough of Linz.
    - Sankt Pölten,
    - Steyr,
    - Villach,
    - Wels,
    - Wiener Neustadt,
  - Grieskirchen is also the seat of both districts of Eferding and Grieskirchen, which share one district commission.
- Belarus: Minsk – administrative center of Minsk Region, itself a city with special status of capital
- Belgium: The City of Brussels is the capital of the Flanders region, while it is itself part of the Brussels Capital Region
- Bulgaria: Sofia – capital of the Sofia Province, itself an administrative unit (oblast) on its own.
- Croatia: Zagreb – Capital of Zagreb County, itself administratively separate
- Czech Republic: Prague – capital of Central Bohemian Region, Prague-West District and Prague-East District, itself an administrative unit on its own
- France:
  - Lyon – capital of the Rhône department (collectivity), though it is itself the bulk of the administratively separate Lyon Metropolis since 2015
  - A few town halls of French communes are located outside of their boundaries:
    - Château-Chinon (Campagne), the town hall is located in Château-Chinon (Ville);
    - Le Malzieu-Forain, the town hall is located in Le Malzieu-Ville;
    - Le Plessis-Patte-d'Oie, the town hall is located in Berlancourt;
    - Pourcharesses, the town hall is located in Villefort;
    - Rouvres-sous-Meilly, the town hall is located in Meilly-sur-Rouvres;
    - Suzan, the town hall is located in La Bastide-de-Sérou;
    - Taillepied, the town hall is located in Saint-Sauveur-le-Vicomte;
    - Turquestein-Blancrupt, the town hall is located in Saint-Quirin.
- Germany: several rural Kreise (districts of a state) have their capitals in larger nearby cities that have their own separate administration (being self-governing cities that have both Kreis and city level functions) and are not part of the usually homonymous rural Kreis; they include:
  - Amberg;
  - Ansbach;
  - Ausburg;
  - Aschaffenburg;
  - Bamberg;
  - Bayreuth;
  - Darmstadt;
  - Fürth;
  - Goburg;
  - Hof;
  - Ludwigshafeb am Rhein;
  - Kaiserslautern;
  - Kassel;
  - Karlsruhe;
  - Koblenz;
  - Landshut;
  - Laudau in der Pfalz;
  - Munich;
  - Nümberg;
  - Offenbach;
  - Osnabrück;
  - Passau;
  - Pfozheim;
  - Primasens;
  - Regensburg;
  - Rosenheim;
  - Rostock;
  - Schweinfurt;
  - Straubing;
  - Trier;
  - Ulm;
  - Würzburg;
- Greece: Piraeus is the headquarters of the Decentralized Administration of the Aegean, which comprises most islands in the Aegean Sea but is itself located on the mainland, in the Decentralized Administration of Attica.
- Hungary: Budapest – capital of Pest county, and also the Central Hungarian Region, itself having a county status, thus outside Pest county, but within the Central Hungarian Region
- Lithuania: Vilnius – capital of Vilnius district municipality, itself a separate administrative unit (urban municipality).
- Netherlands: Alkmaar – Alkmaar is the seat of the municipality of Bergen, of which it is not a part
- Norway: Oslo – administration headquarters of Akershus county, itself a separate county
- Romania: Bucharest– capital of Ilfov County, itself a municipality with special status
- Russia: Moscow, capital of Moscow Oblast, itself a federal city
- Slovakia: Košice, administrative center of Košice-okolie District, itself divided into four separate districts: Košice I, Košice II, Košice III, and Košice IV
- Ukraine: Kyiv, administrative centre of Kyiv Oblast, itself a city with special status
- United Kingdom:
  - Aberdeen, Scotland – Aberdeen was the historic county town of Aberdeenshire but now forms a separate local authority. Aberdeenshire Council's headquarters remain within the city of Aberdeen, the only local authority in Scotland to have its council sit in another local authority area.
  - Abingdon-on-Thames, England – Since 2014, the district councils of South Oxfordshire and Vale of White Horse have been located in the same headquarters. In 2014, the Vale of White Horse District Council moved into the headquarters of the South Oxfordshire District Council in Crowmarsh Gifford, South Oxfordshire. In 2015, due to a fire, both councils moved to Milton, Vale of White Horse. In 2022, both councils temporarily moved to Abingdon, Vale of White Horse, intending to move together to a new headquarters in Didcot, South Oxfordshire, initially planned to be completed in 2023.
  - Ipswich, England, United Kingdom, itself a non-metropolitan district, serves as the administrative centre for the neighboring districts of Babergh and Mid Suffolk.

=== Oceania ===
- Alice Springs, Northern Territory, Australia - seat of three distinct local government areas of the Northern Territory: the Central Desert Region, the MacDonnell Region, and itself, the Town of Alice Springs, which is not part of either region.
- Darwin, Northern Territory, Australia - seat of the separate Tiwi Islands Region of the Northern Territory, itself its own local government area on the mainland as the City of Darwin. Additionally, two areas of the Northern Territory have no local government and are administered directly by the territory's government, and hence from Darwin, the territory's capital city: the Northern Territory Rates Act Area and the Unincorporated Top End Region.
- Honiara, Solomon Islands – capital of Guadalcanal Province, while itself a separate capital territory
- Invercargill, New Zealand – seat of government for the large, rural Southland District to its north while also a territorial authority in its own right.
- Katherine, Northern Territory, Australia - seat of two separate local government areas of the Northern Territory: the Roper Gulf Region and the Victoria Daly Region, while being itself part of neither and its own local government area as the Town of Katherine.
- Mount Gambier, South Australia – seat of government for the District Council of Grant. The city is surrounded by the District Council of Grant but is not actually a part of it, instead being a part of the Mount Gambier local government area.
- Port Augusta, South Australia - one of the two seats that share the administrative functions of the immense but very sparsely populated Outback Communities Authority local government area of South Australia, itself its own separate government area as the City of Port Augusta, which does not even border the Outback Communities Authority area. The other seat is the town of Andamooka, which is within the Outback Communities Authority area.
- Port Moresby, Papua New Guinea – capital of Central Province which surrounds city, but the city itself is in (and also the capital of) the National Capital District

== Historical ==
=== Africa ===
- Botswana: Francistown was the capital of the North-East District, itself a separately administered urban district, but the current North-East District is seated at Masunga.
- Senegal: Saint-Louis, the Senegalese city was the administrative capital of the French colony of Mauritania from 1902 to 1960.
- South Africa: Mafikeng (formerly Mafeking), from where the former British protectorate of Bechuanaland, today Botswana, was administered, the city itself being in South Africa.

=== Americas ===
- Canada: Ottawa, Ontario, Canada – location of the 2nd Council of the Northwest Territories from 1905 to 1951
- Cuba: Havana, capital of the former La Habana Province, which was distinct from the city of Havana (Ciudad de la Habana), administered separately. A reorganization of Cuban provinces in 2011 split La Habana Province into two new provinces, Artemisa and Mayabeque, their respective capital cities being Artemisa and San José de las Lajas.
- United States:
  - Texas:
    - Marshall was the capital of the exiled Confederate government of Missouri during the American Civil War.
    - San Antonio was the capital of the exiled Confederate territorial government of the New Mexico Territory in the American Civil War.
  - Virginia:
    - Bedford, the county seat of Bedford County, was not a part of the county until 2013, when it lost its status as an independent city and became a town within Bedford County.
    - Richmond remained the county seat of Henrico County when it became an independent city in 1871 until the county seat was moved to Laurel in the 20th century.
    - Stauton, the county seat of Augusta County, until June 15, 2026, when it was moved to Verona.

=== Asia-Oceania ===
- Busan, South Korea – capital of the province of South Gyeongsang, itself a metropolitan city (from 1963, when the city was separated from the province, to 1983, when it was replaced by Changwon)
- Calicut (Kozhikode), India – until 1964, the administration of the then Union Territory of the Laccadive, Minicoy and Amindivi Islands (now Lakshadweep) was conducted from offices in the city of Kozhikode (better known in English as Calicut), located on the mainland, in the state of Kerala. The territory's government is now seated on the island of Kavaratti.
- Canton (now Guangzhou), China – capital of the province of Kwangtung (now Guangdong), Republic of China, itself a centrally-administered city
- Cotabato City, Philippines – former administrative center of the Autonomous Region in Muslim Mindanao, but itself part of the Soccsksargen region. After a 2019 referendum, the city became part of the newly created Bangsamoro Autonomous Region in Muslim Mindanao, of which it is now the de facto capital.
- Daegu, South Korea – capital of the province of North Gyeongsang, itself a metropolitan city (from 1981, when the city was separated from the province, to 2016, when it was replaced by Andong)
- Daejeon, South Korea – capital of the province of South Chungcheong, itself a metropolitan city (from 1989, when the city was separated from the province, to 2012, when it was replaced by Hongseong)
- Denpasar, Bali, Indonesia – capital of the Regency of Badung, itself an autonomous city, until 2009. Since 2009 Mangupura is the capital of the Regency of Badung.
- Gwangju, South Korea – capital of the province of South Jeolla, itself a metropolitan city (from 1986, when the city was separated from the province, to 2005, when it was replaced by Muan)
- Hyderabad, India - former capital of the state of Andhra Pradesh. In 2014, the new state of Telangana was split from Andhra Pradesh, and Hyderabad became part of Telangana, but remained provisionally the capital city of both states, according to the Andhra Pradesh Reorganisation Act, 2014. Over the next few years, Andhra Pradesh government institutions started gradually moving to the Vijayawada area in the state proper, and it was decided to build a new, specially planned capital city, Amaravati, in that area. The move was essentially complete by 2017, and Amaravati became de facto the new Andhra Pradesh capital, but despite many pieces of provisional legislation, Amaravati was only fully and officially designated as the new state capital city in early 2026.
- Isabela, Philippines – former capital of Basilan, designated as component city since April 25, 2001. Basilan is previously part of Zamboanga Peninsula and the province of Basilan is transferred to the Autonomous Region in Muslim Mindanao. Isabela is still considered part of the region and still considered part of the province. Since 2017, the seat of the provincial government of Basilan was moved to Lamitan. Isabela still remains part of Basilan provincial services but regional services remains in Zamboanga Peninsula instead of ARMM where the province of Basilan belongs.
- Kuala Lumpur, Malaysia – former capital of the state of Selangor. In 1974, Kuala Lumpur was separated from the state and made into a federal territory. Kuala Lumpur remained the state capital until 1978, when Shah Alam was declared as the new capital.
- Mukden (now Shenyang), China – capital of the province of Fengtian (now Liaoning), Republic of China, itself a centrally-administered city
- Pasig, Philippines – former capital of Rizal and designated as a highly urbanized city since January 21, 1995. Pasig was made a part of Metro Manila since November 7, 1975, taking it outside the border of Rizal. Rizal has moved its provincial government seat to Antipolo, the de facto capital and a component city within its borders, in 2009. Antipolo was made its de jure capital in 2020.
- Pematangsiantar, North Sumatra, Indonesia – capital of the Simalungun Regency, itself an autonomous city, until 2008. Since 2008, Raya is the capital of the regency.
- Peshawar, Pakistan – administrative center of the Federally Administered Tribal Areas (FATA) from Pakistan's independence in 1947 until March 2018, when the FATA were merged into the province of Khyber Pakhtunkhwa, where Peshawar itself is located, and of which it is also the capital city.
- Seoul, South Korea – capital of the province of Gyeonggi, itself a metropolitan city (from 1946, when the city was separated from the province, to 1967, when it was replaced by Suwon). It was also claimed as the capital of North Korea until 1972, where the de facto Capital, Pyongyang, was also made the de jure capital.
- Sian (now Xi'an), China – capital of the province of Shensi (now Shaanxi), Republic of China, itself a centrally-administered city
- Xindian, Taiwan – capital of the province of Fukien, Republic of China from 1956 to 1996, itself located in Taiwan Province. Before 1956, the capital was Jincheng; it was moved back to Jincheng in 1996.

=== Europe ===
- Aachen, Germany – as described above, there are many examples of a German city that serves as capital of an eponymous rural district, but is independent of that district. However, there are many places where this either wasn't the case initially, or where it isn't the case anymore. The former town of Burtscheid (now a neighborhood in Aachen) provides an example of both. It was the capital of Landkreis Aachen from that district's creation until 1897, when Burtscheid was absorbed into the city of Aachen. The district administration did not relocate, meaning the capital of the Landkreis was no longer within its own borders. In 2009, the Landkreis and the city were merged, becoming the Städteregion Aachen, with the administration still located in the Burtscheid neighborhood of Aachen.
- Berlin, Germany - from 1945 to 1990, the whole city of Berlin was de jure under the authority of the Allied Control Council and part of neither the Federal Republic of Germany nor the German Democratic Republic (GDR), but Allied jurisdiction over East Berlin (officially just the Soviet sector of Berlin in the view of the Western Allies) was not recognized by the GDR. The Eastern half of the city was treated de facto as part of the GDR, it was the seat of the GDR government, and was proclaimed Berlin, Hauptstadt der DDR ("Berlin, capital city of the GDR").
- Copenhagen, Denmark – from 1952 to 1992, the administration of Copenhagen County was located on Blegdamsvej in Copenhagen Municipality, which was surrounded by, but not part of the county.
- Cwmbran, Wales, United Kingdom - Between 1996 and 2013, Cwmbran, located in the principal area of Torfaen, was the administrative headquarters of the neighbouring principal area of Monmouthshire.
- Hanover, Germany – Hanover was the capital of the rural district of Hanover (Landkreis Hannover), while itself being an independent city (kreisfreie Stadt), until the city and district were merged into the current Hanover Region, a Kommunalverband besonderer Art, in 2001.
- Heemstede, the Netherlands – Heemstede was the seat of the newly formed municipality of Haarlemmermeer until 1867, when the seat was moved to Hoofddorp.
- Hereford, United Kingdom – The headquarters of the South Herefordshire District Council were located in Hereford, itself part of Hereford District, from 1974 until 1998, when both districts were absorbed into the unitary authority of Herefordshire.
- Kingston upon Thames, United Kingdom – In 1893, Surrey County Council (SCC) moved to Kingston upon Thames. When Greater London was created in 1965, it took in parts of Surrey including Kingston, but the SCC stayed at County Hall. In 2021, the County Council moved to Reigate.
- Newcastle upon Tyne, United Kingdom – County town of Northumberland from 1889 until 1981. Newcastle was indeed part of Northumberland until 1974, when it became part of the new metropolitan county of Tyne and Wear. Still, it remained the seat of the Northumberland County Council until 1981, when the Council moved to Morpeth.
- Oldenburg, Germany – Oldenburg was the capital of the rural district of Oldenburg (Landkreis Oldenburg), while itself being an independent city (kreisfreie Stadt), until the capital was moved to Wildeshausen in 1988.
- Saarbrücken, Germany – Saarbrücken was the capital of the rural district of Saarbrücken (Landkreis Saarbrücken), while itself being an independent city (kreisfreie Stadt), until the city and district were merged into the current district of Saarbrücken, a Kommunalverband besonderer Art, in 1974.
- Sneek, the Netherlands – capital of the municipality of Sneek and nearby Wymbritseradeel
- Stockholm, Sweden – capital of the Stockholm County, itself not a part of the county, administered by the Office of the Governor of Stockholm until 1968 when it was merged into the county
- Tønsberg, Norway – administration headquarters of Sem Municipality which existed as a separate municipality from 1838 until 1988 when it became part of Tønsberg Municipality.
- Vienna, Austria – capital of surrounding Lower Austria, itself a federal state of Austria, until 1986, when the Lower Austrian capital city was moved to Sankt Pölten.
- Weesp, the Netherlands – Weesp was the seat of the municipality of Weesperkarspel until 1966, when the latter was abolished and its territory divided among the municipalities of Amsterdam and Weesp.
- Zwolle, the Netherlands – Zwolle was the seat of the municipality of Zwollerkerspel until 1967, when the latter was abolished and its territory divided among the municipalities of Zwolle, Genemuiden, Hasselt, Heino and IJsselmuiden.

== See also ==
- Temporary capital
- Government in exile
