= 2024 Special Geographic Area municipality creation plebiscites =

2024 Special Geographic Area plebiscites
- April 13, 2024
- Plebiscite to ratify Bangsamoro Acts No. 41–48
- Map highlighting the barangays of the Special Geographic Area
- Outcome: All bills proposing the establishment of eight municipalities ratified

On April 13, 2024, plebiscites were held in the Special Geographic Area (SGA) of Bangsamoro in the Philippines to ratify Bangsamoro Acts No. 41–48, which proposed the creation of eight new municipalities out of the 63 barangays in the SGA.

== Background ==
=== Area clusters and reorganization ===
In September 2019, there was a reported proposal to reorganize the Cotabato barangays into four municipalities through regional legislation and possibly annex them to the neighboring Maguindanao province. Pending the passage of the regional law, there is a plan by Chief Minister Murad Ebrahim to issue an executive order to group the barangays into eight clusters. However, such a plan to form towns from the barangays was temporarily set aside, and it was decided that an administrative body be formed to oversee the barangays' affairs.

Another proposal was to group the barangays into three municipalities instead of four. One of the proposed municipalities is Sultan Tambilawan, which is planned to consist of Midsayap's 13 barangays.

The regional government would wait for the results of the 2020 census to determine the exact barangays that would be reorganized into new towns.

By March 2020, the 63 barangays had already been grouped into a Special Geographic Area of the Bangsamoro region. and eight area clusters were formed.

==== Legislations ====
On December 21, 2022, Parliament Bills No. 129 to 136 were filed in the Bangsamoro Parliament proposing the barangays be grouped into eight municipalities.

On August 17, 2023, the bills consolidating the barangays into 8 municipalities were approved by the Bangsamoro Parliament, Chief Minister Ebrahim signed the bills into law (Bangsamoro Act No. 41 to 48) on September 4, 2023.

=== Proposed municipalities ===
Proposed municipalities
Municipality (Note: Names as stated in the final approved bills)	Barangays		Legislation		Proposed municipalities that will be created from the special geographic area of Bangsamoro: Pahamuddin Kadayangan Nabalawag Old Kaabakan Kapalawan Malidegao Tugunan Ligawasan
Municipality	Seat of government	Other barangays	PB No.	BA No.	Proposed municipalities that will be created from the special geographic area of Bangsamoro: Pahamuddin Kadayangan Nabalawag Old Kaabakan Kapalawan Malidegao Tugunan Ligawasan
Pahamuddin	Libungan Torreta	Balacayon; Buricain; Datu Binasing; Datu Mantil; Kadilingan; Lower Pangangkalan; Matilac; Patot; Upper Pangangkalan; Lower Baquer; Simsiman	129	41	Proposed municipalities that will be created from the special geographic area of Bangsamoro: Pahamuddin Kadayangan Nabalawag Old Kaabakan Kapalawan Malidegao Tugunan Ligawasan
Kadayangan	Kapinpilan	Central Labas; Malingao; Mudseng; Sambulawan; Tugal; Tumbras	130	42	Proposed municipalities that will be created from the special geographic area of Bangsamoro: Pahamuddin Kadayangan Nabalawag Old Kaabakan Kapalawan Malidegao Tugunan Ligawasan
Nabalawag (Note: Previously proposed to be named as Kabalukan)	Nabalawag	Damatulan; Kadigasan; Kadingilan; Kudarangan; Olandang; Dungguan	131	43	Proposed municipalities that will be created from the special geographic area of Bangsamoro: Pahamuddin Kadayangan Nabalawag Old Kaabakan Kapalawan Malidegao Tugunan Ligawasan
Old Kaabakan (Note: Previously proposed to be named as Northern Kabacan or Laya)	Pedtad or Nangaan	Buluan; Sanggadong; Simbuhay; Simone; Tamped	132	44	Proposed municipalities that will be created from the special geographic area of Bangsamoro: Pahamuddin Kadayangan Nabalawag Old Kaabakan Kapalawan Malidegao Tugunan Ligawasan
Kapalawan	Kitulaan	Kibayao; Langogan; Manarapan; Nasapian; Pebpoloan; Tupig	133	45	Proposed municipalities that will be created from the special geographic area of Bangsamoro: Pahamuddin Kadayangan Nabalawag Old Kaabakan Kapalawan Malidegao Tugunan Ligawasan
Malidegao (Note: Previously proposed to be named as Malmar or Madridagao)	Gokotan	Balungis; Batulawan; Fort Pikit; Nabundas; Nalapaan; Nunguan	134	46	Proposed municipalities that will be created from the special geographic area of Bangsamoro: Pahamuddin Kadayangan Nabalawag Old Kaabakan Kapalawan Malidegao Tugunan Ligawasan
Tugunan	Manaulanan	Balong; Bualan; Lagunde; Macabual; Macasendeg; Pamalian; Panicupan; Tapodoc	135	47	Proposed municipalities that will be created from the special geographic area of Bangsamoro: Pahamuddin Kadayangan Nabalawag Old Kaabakan Kapalawan Malidegao Tugunan Ligawasan
Ligawasan	Bagoinged	Barungis; Bulol; Buliok; Gli-Gli; Kabasalan; Rajamuda	136	48	Proposed municipalities that will be created from the special geographic area of Bangsamoro: Pahamuddin Kadayangan Nabalawag Old Kaabakan Kapalawan Malidegao Tugunan Ligawasan

== Conduct ==
The Bangsamoro government planned to hold the plebiscite for the ratification of the bills alongside the 2023 Philippine barangay and Sangguniang Kabataan elections on October 30, 2023. However, such plan was considered impossible by the Bangsamoro office of the Commission on Elections due to time constraints.

The plebiscites were held on April 13, 2024. COMELEC stated that there were 89,594 registered voters covering 189 clustered precincts in 67 voting centers.

The Office of the Presidential Adviser on Peace, Reconciliation and Unity reported that the creation was declared ratified after the completion of canvassing at 9 pm. Reported voter turnout was 81.10%; while among the valid votes cast, 99.62% were in favor; only 27 participated voters abstained.

The conduct of the plebiscites were declared as generally peaceful and orderly. However it was noted that voter turnout in a barangay in Aleosan was affected by a clan feud, while in another barangay in Pigcawayan where a former Bangsamoro Transition Authority officer resides, more than half of the voters refuse to participate.

== Results ==
2024 Special Geographic Area plebiscites
Choice	Votes	%
For	72,358	99.62
Against	273	0.38
Total	72,631	100.00
Valid votes	72,631	99.96
Invalid/blank votes	27	0.04
Total votes	72,658	100.00
Registered voters/turnout	89,594	81.10
Source: COMELEC

Results per mother municipality
Mother municipality	Yes		No		Valid votes		Invalid votes		Turnout		Registered voters
Mother municipality	Total	%	Total	%	Total	%	Total	%	Total	%	Registered voters
Aleosan	1,623	99.63%	6	0.37%	1,629	100%	0	0%	1,629	63.39%	2,570
Carmen	10,495	99.98%	2	0.02%	10,497	99.93%	7	0.07%	10,504	81.34%	12,913
Kabacan	6,611	99.94%	4	0.06%	6,615	100%	0	0%	6,615	86.88%	7,614
Midsayap	12,590	99.31%	88	0.69%	12,678	99.94%	7	0.06%	12,685	73.17%	17,337
Pigcawayan	5,974	98.1%	116	1.9%	6,090	99.85%	9	0.15%	6,099	64.09%	9,517
Pikit	35,065	99.84%	57	0.16%	35,122	99.99%	4	0.01%	35,126	88.61%	39,643

Results per proposed municipality
Proposed municipality	Yes		No		Valid votes		Invalid votes		Turnout		Registered voters
Proposed municipality	Total	%	Total	%	Total	%	Total	%	Total	%	Registered voters
Kadayangan	6,292	98.74%	80	1.26%	6,372	99.89%	7	0.11%	6,379	71.37%	8,938
Kapalawan	10,495	99.98%	2	0.02%	10,497	99.93%	7	0.07%	10,504	81.34%	12,913
Ligawasan	11,788	100%	0	0%	11,788	100%	0	0%	11,788	93.53%	12,603
Malidegao	12,255	99.64%	44	0.36%	12,299	99.97%	4	0.03%	12,303	79.28%	15,519
Nabalawag	7,442	99.81%	14	0.19%	7,456	100%	0	0%	7,456	72.01%	10,354
Old Kaabakan	6,611	99.94%	4	0.06%	6,615	100%	0	0%	6,615	86.88%	7,614
Pahamuddin	5,974	98.1%	116	1.9%	6,090	99.85%	9	0.15%	6,099	64.09%	9,517
Tugunan	11,501	99.89%	13	0.11%	11,514	11514%	0	0%	11,514	94.87%	12,136
