= Special Geographic Area's 2nd parliamentary district =

Parliamentary district for the Bangsamoro Parliament

- Constituency for the Bangsamoro Parliament
- Boundary of the Special Geographic Area's 2nd parliamentary district in the Special Geographic Area
- Area: Special Geographic Area
- Population: 110,121 (2024)
- Electorate: 71,037 (2026)

Current constituency
- Member of Parliament: Elaysa Enalang (elect)
- Political party: UBJP

The Special Geographic Area's 2nd parliamentary district is the second of the two parliamentary districts of the Special Geographic Area for the Bangsamoro Parliament. It is composed of the municipalities of Kapalawan, Ligawasan, Malidegao, and Old Kaabakan in Cotabato.

Elaysa Enalang of the United Bangsamoro Justice Party is the member of Parliament-elect for the district following the inaugural 2026 Bangsamoro Parliament election. She will assume office on October 30, 2026.

== List of MPs representing the district ==
No.	Portrait	Member (Lifespan)	Term of office	Party	Parliament	Electoral history	Constituencies
1		Elaysa Enalang (born 1983)	Assuming office on October 30, 2026	UBJP	1st Parliament	Elected in 2026.	2026–present Kapalawan, Ligawasan, Malidegao, Old Kaabakan

== Election results ==
=== 2026 ===
2026 Bangsamoro Parliament election in the Special Geographic Area
Party	Candidate	Votes	%
UBJP	Elaysa Enalang	20,954	37.03
Independent	Kadil Sinolinding Jr.	20,199	35.70
BFP	Dulia Sultan	13,662	24.14
Independent	Allanuddin Hassan	1,749	3.09
Independent	Kenindia Sinagandal	20	0.04
Total votes		56,584	100.00
UBJP win (new seat)			
