= Dargovských hrdinov =

Dargovských hrdinov "Furča"
- Borough
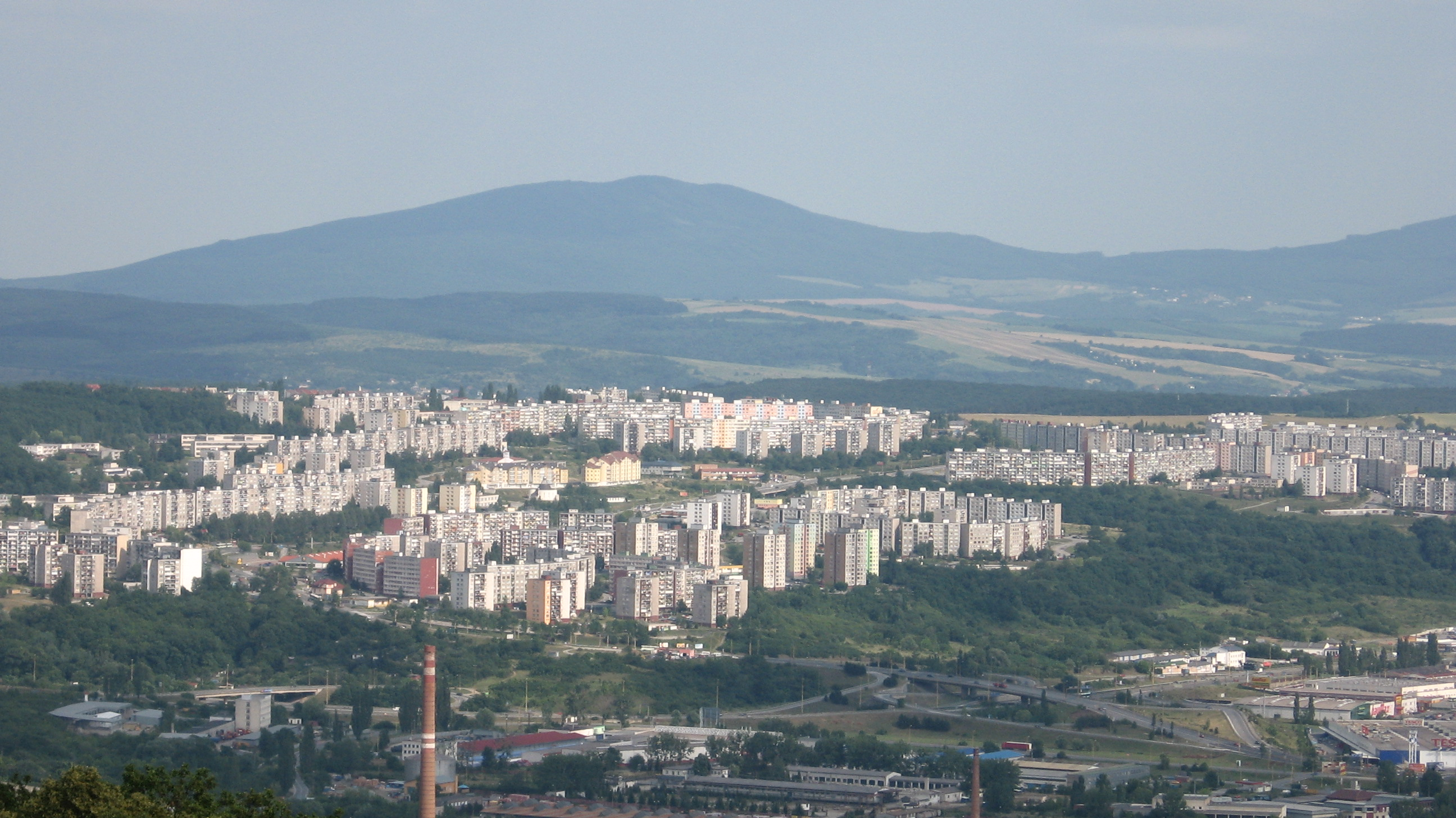
- Housing estates in Dargovských hrdinov borough

- Flag Coat of arms
- Nickname: Furča
- Location within Košice

- Location of Sídlisko Dargovských Hrdinov in Slovakia
- Coordinates: 48°45′14″N 21°16′03″E
- Country: Slovakia
- Region: Košice
- District: Košice III
- Borough: 29 June 1976

Area
  - Total: 7.35 km^{2} (2.84 sq mi)
- Elevation: 321 m (1,053 ft)

Population (2025)
  - Total: 23,822
- Time zone: UTC+1 (CET)
  - Summer (DST): UTC+2 (CEST)
- Postal code: 040 22
- Area code: +421-55
- Vehicle registration plate (until 2022): KE
- Website: www.kosice-dh.sk

Dargovských hrdinov (literally: "(Borough) of the Dargov Heroes", Hungarian: Dargói Hősök lakótelep), commonly referred to as Furča after the hill it is built upon, is a borough (city ward) of Košice, Slovakia, located in the Košice III district.

Located largely on the side of a hill named Furča, the vast majority of the Dargovských hrdinov borough consists of housing, built mainly in the form of panel houses. There are little to no industrial structures or activities in the borough, which is one of the largest residential developments built in Slovakia during the Communist era.

== History ==
Construction of the microdistrict began in the early 1970s, with the first completed part of the borough officially opening on the 29 June 1976. Currently, there are more than 26,000 people living in the borough. The name of the housing estate and borough was chosen in honour of the combat veterans of the WWII Battle of Dargov Pass, fought over a key regional route in the Slanské Hills to the east of Košice during the winter of 1944/1945.

== Statistics ==
- Area: 11.09 square kilometres (4.28 sq mi)
- Population: 26,169 (31 December 2017)
- Population density: 2,400/km² (31 December 2017)
- District: Košice III
- Mayor: Jozef Andrejčák (as of 2018 elections)

== Geography ==
The municipality lies at an altitude of 321 metres (1,053 ft) and covers an area of 7.35 km^{2} (2.84 sq mi) (2025).

== Population ==
Population statistic (10 years)
Year	1995	2005	2015	2025
Count	0	27,844	26,563	23,822
Difference		–	−4.60%	−10.31%

Population statistic
Year	2024	2025
Count	24,158	23,822
Difference		−1.39%

It has a population of 23,822 people (31 December 2025).

=== Ethnicity ===
Census 2021 (1+ %)
Ethnicity	Number	Fraction
Slovak	21,894	86.76%
Not found out	2519	9.98%
Hungarian	755	2.99%
Rusyn	489	1.93%
Total	25,234	

In year 2021 was 25,234 people by ethnicity 21,894 as Slovak, 2519 as Not found out, 755 as Hungarian, 489 as Rusyn, 205 as Czech, 171 as Romani, 117 as Other, 90 as Ukrainian, 56 as German, 44 as Russian, 21 as Polish, 13 as Jewish, 8 as English, 7 as Irish, 7 as Vietnamese, 6 as Moravian, 5 as Greek, 5 as Croatian, 4 as Turkish, 4 as Bulgarian, 3 as Chinese, 3 as Italian, 3 as Serbian, 3 as Silesian, 3 as Austrian, 3 as French, 2 as Albanian, 1 as Romanian and 1 as Canadian.

Note on population: The difference values of population numbers in the table "Population statistic" and in the sections "Ethnicity" & "Religion" is caused by the use of various statistical methods.

=== Religion ===
Census 2021 (1+ %)
Religion	Number	Fraction
Roman Catholic Church	11,196	44.37%
None	7136	28.28%
Not found out	2733	10.83%
Greek Catholic Church	1947	7.72%
Evangelical Church	824	3.27%
Calvinist Church	493	1.95%
Eastern Orthodox Church	311	1.23%
Total	25,234	

In year 2021 was 25,234 people by religion 11,196 from Roman Catholic Church, 7136 from None, 2733 from Not found out, 1947 from Greek Catholic Church, 824 from Evangelical Church, 493 from Calvinist Church, 311 from Eastern Orthodox Church, 92 from Ad hoc movements, 80 from Jehovah's Witnesses, 73 from Other, 71 from Apostolic Church, 51 from Christian Congregations in Slovakia, 46 from Other and not ascertained christian church, 34 from Islam, 29 from Seventh-day Adventist Church, 22 from Baptists Church, 20 from Buddhism, 18 from Paganism and natural spirituality, 15 from United Methodist Church, 10 from Jewish community, 9 from Church of the Brethren, 6 from Old Catholic Church, 5 from Hinduism, 5 from Church of Jesus Christ of Latter-day Saints, 5 from Bahá'i Community, 2 from New Apostolic Church and 1 from Czechoslovak Hussite Church.

== Gallery ==
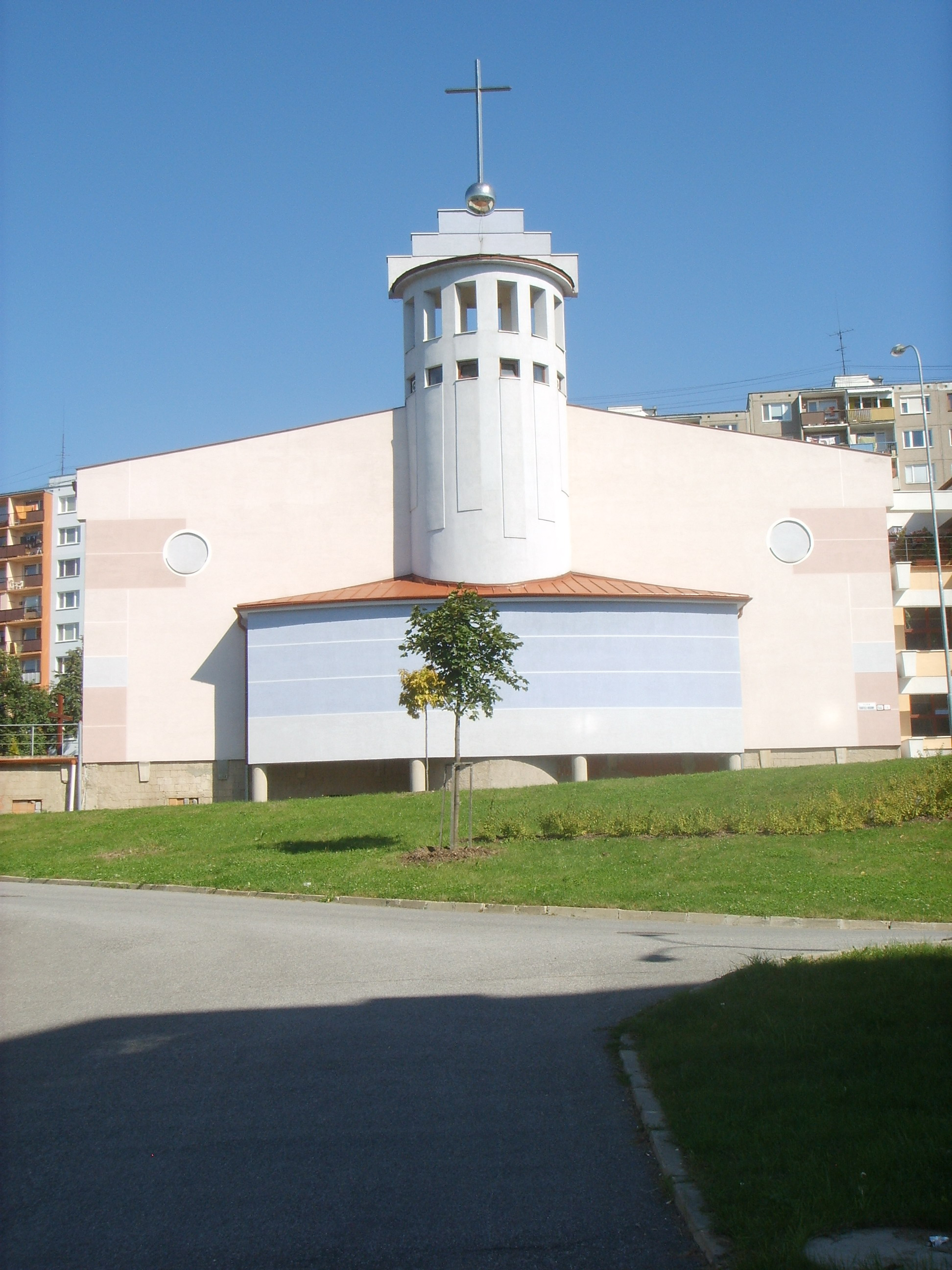
Church of the Holy Family, a Roman Catholic church in the borough

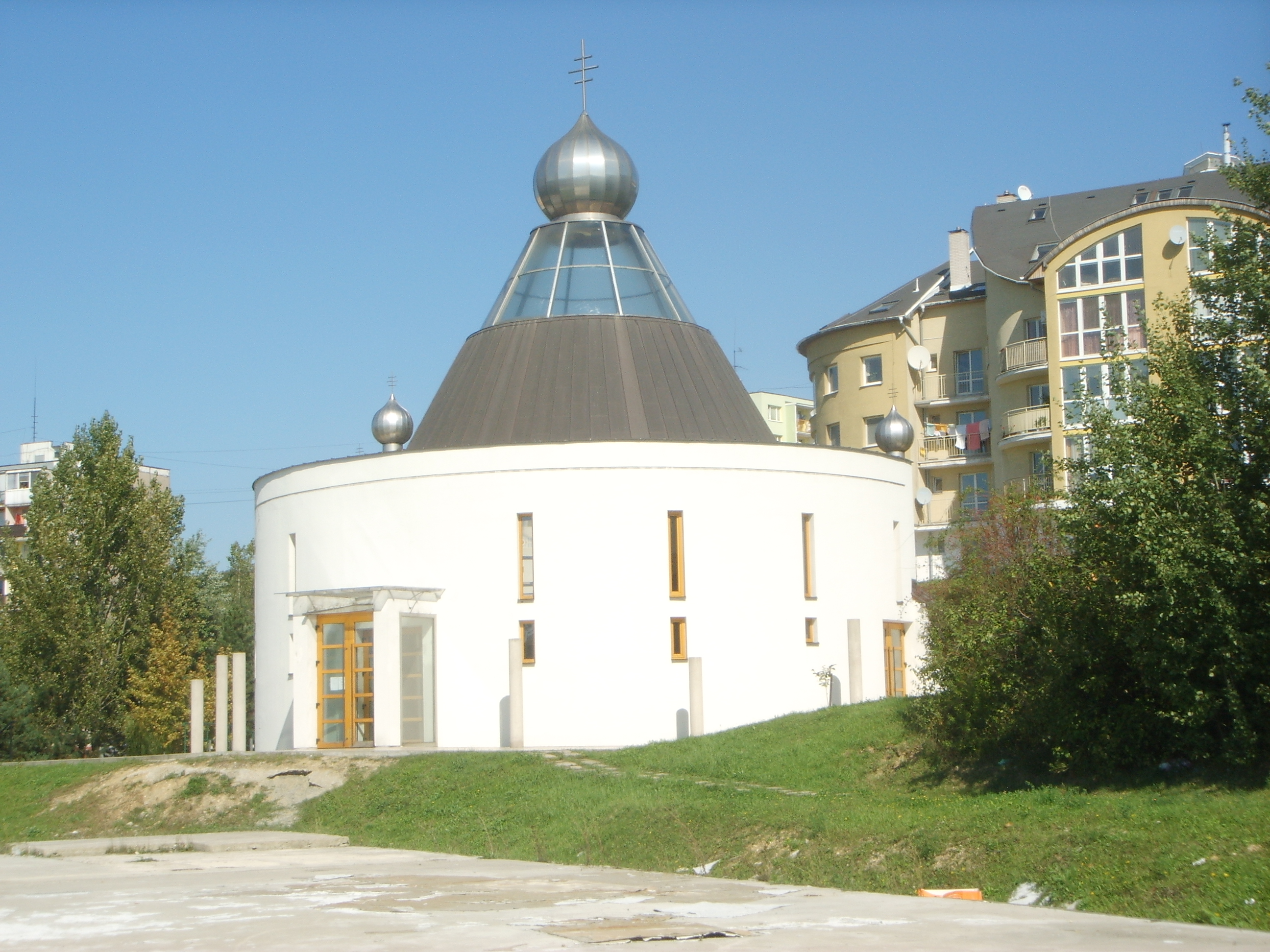
Church of God's Wisdom, a Greek Catholic Church in the borough

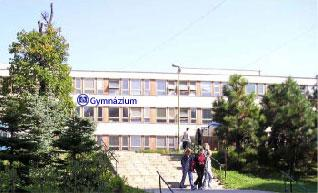
Local gymnázium school on Exnárova Street
