= Košická Nová Ves =

Coordinates: 48°43′54″N 21°18′03″E

- Borough
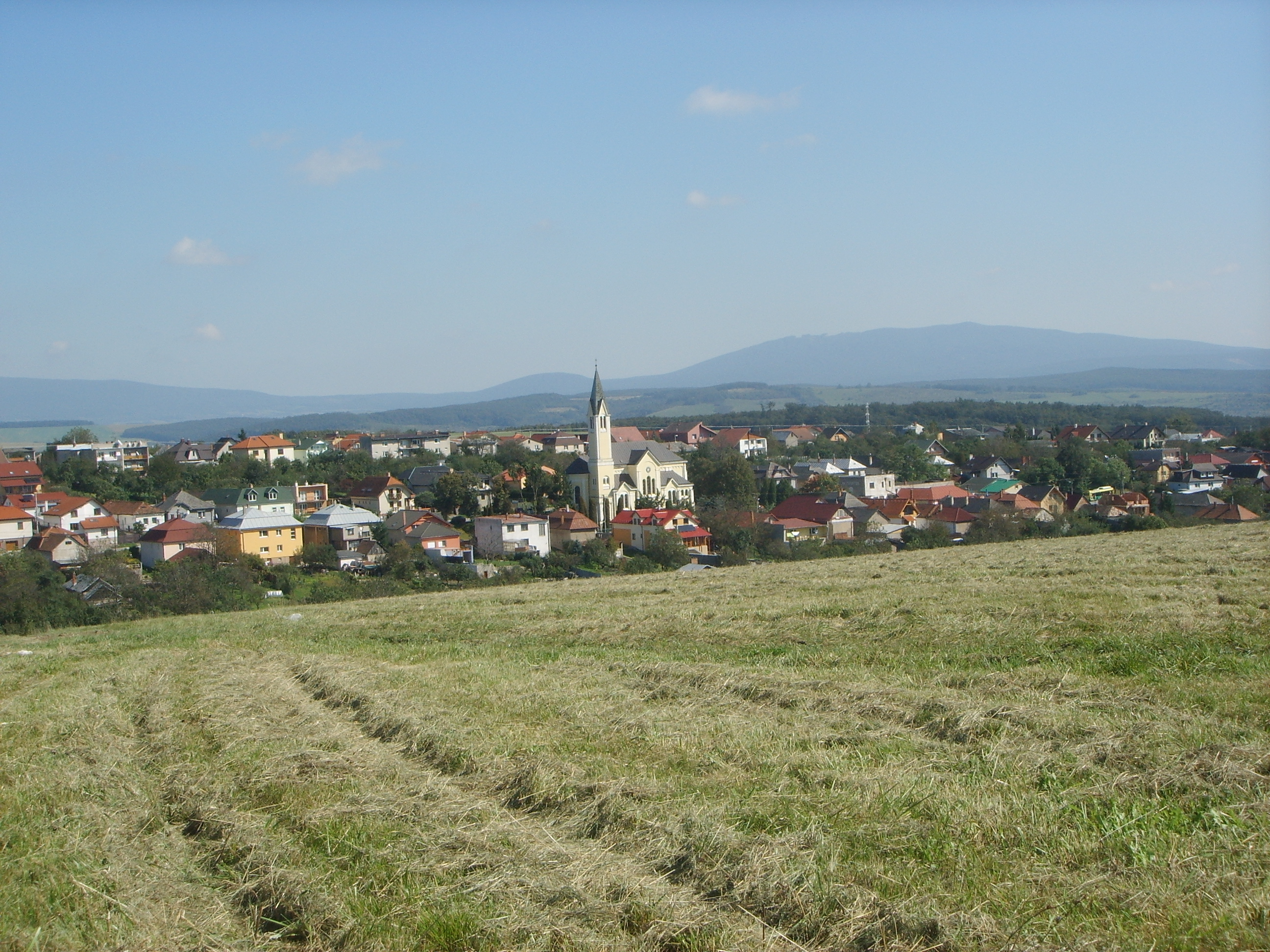
- Košická Nová Ves during early autumn (2010)

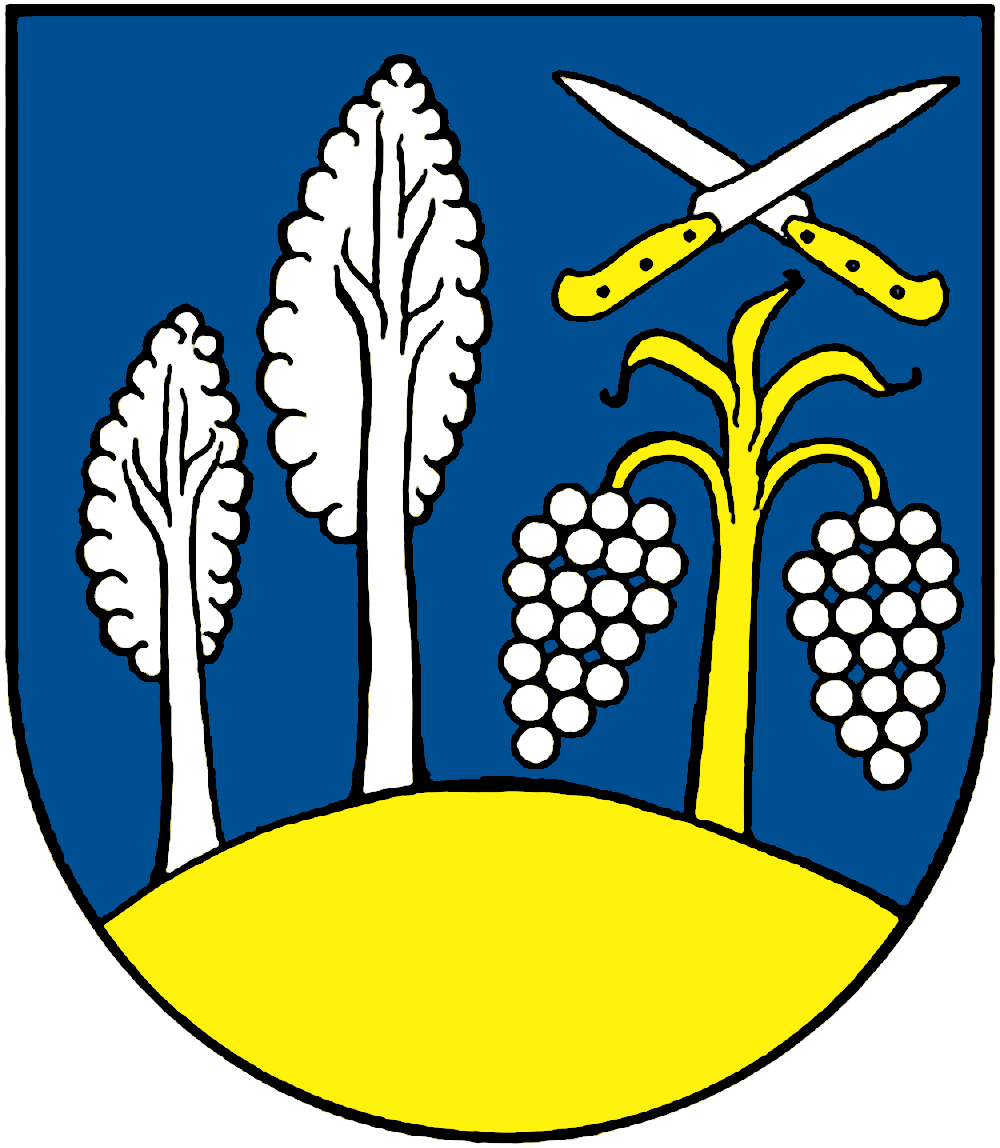
- Flag Coat of arms

- Location within Košice

- Location of Košická Nová Ves in Slovakia
- Country: Slovakia
- Region: Košice
- District: Košice III
- Village: 1297 (first known record)
- Borough: 1968 (annexed to Košice); 1990 (current status)

Area
  - Total: 9.47 km^{2} (3.66 sq mi)
- Elevation: 313 m (1,027 ft)

Population (2025)
  - Total: 3,142
- Time zone: UTC+1 (CET)
  - Summer (DST): UTC+2 (CEST)
- Postal code: 040 14
- Area code: +421-55
- Vehicle registration plate (until 2022): KE
- Website: www.kosickanovaves.sk

Košická Nová Ves (Hungarian: Kassaújfalu) is a borough (city ward) of Košice, Slovakia. Located in the Košice III district, it lies at an altitude of roughly 261 metres (856 ft) above sea level.

== History ==
The first written record of Košická Nová Ves is from 1297. In that year, St Ladislaus' Church was built there. St Ladislaus Church has kept the same patron saint to this day.

Košická Nová Ves was originally a separate village municipality until 1968, when it was annexed to the city. Since 1990, it has been one of the 22 boroughs of Košice. The borough still retains a rural character. There are no industrial zones and most of the housing is rural in nature.

Nowadays, the borough of Košická Nová Ves covers an area of 5.77 km^{2}, with a population of 2,691.

=== Evolution of the borough's name ===
- 1297 - Cassa Uj Falu
- 1317 - Nova Villa
- 1773 - Kassa-Új-Falu, Kossiczka Nowa Wes
- 1808 - Kassa-Újfalu, Neudorf, Nowá Wes
- 1863 - Kassaújfalu
- 1920 - Košická Nová Ves

== Location ==
- Latitude: 48° 43'
- Longitude: 21° 18'
- Altitude: 261 m (859 feet)

== Statistics ==
- Area: 5.77 square kilometres (2.23 sq mi)
- Population: 2,691 (31 December 2017)
- Density of population: 470/km^{2} (31 December 2017)
- District: Košice III
- Mayor: Michal Krcho (as of 2018 elections)

== Geography ==
The municipality lies at an altitude of 313 metres (1,027 ft) and covers an area of 9.47 km^{2} (3.66 sq mi) (2025).

== Population ==
Population statistic (10 years)
Year	1995	2005	2015	2025
Count	0	2447	2663	3142
Difference		–	+8.82%	+17.98%

Population statistic
Year	2024	2025
Count	3178	3142
Difference		−1.13%

It has a population of 3142 people (31 December 2025).

=== Ethnicity ===
Census 2021 (1+ %)
Ethnicity	Number	Fraction
Slovak	2537	87.45%
Not found out	241	8.3%
Romani	90	3.1%
Hungarian	55	1.89%
Rusyn	42	1.44%
Total	2901	

In year 2021 was 2901 people by ethnicity 2537 as Slovak, 241 as Not found out, 90 as Romani, 55 as Hungarian, 42 as Rusyn, 15 as Czech, 8 as Other, 6 as Ukrainian, 4 as German, 3 as Chinese, 3 as Bulgarian, 1 as Jewish, 1 as Irish, 1 as Polish, 1 as Canadian, 1 as Iranian and 1 as Albanian.

Note on population: The difference values of population numbers in the table "Population statistic" and in the sections "Ethnicity" & "Religion" is caused by the use of various statistical methods.

=== Religion ===
Census 2021 (1+ %)
Religion	Number	Fraction
Roman Catholic Church	1605	55.33%
None	681	23.47%
Not found out	239	8.24%
Greek Catholic Church	148	5.1%
Evangelical Church	97	3.34%
Eastern Orthodox Church	30	1.03%
Total	2901	

In year 2021 was 2901 people by religion 1605 from Roman Catholic Church, 681 from None, 239 from Not found out, 148 from Greek Catholic Church, 97 from Evangelical Church, 30 from Eastern Orthodox Church, 28 from Calvinist Church, 18 from Apostolic Church, 11 from Other, 11 from Ad hoc movements, 10 from Other and not ascertained christian church, 7 from Paganism and natural spirituality, 6 from Buddhism, 3 from Jehovah's Witnesses, 2 from Christian Congregations in Slovakia, 2 from Islam, 2 from United Methodist Church and 1 from Seventh-day Adventist Church.

== Gallery ==
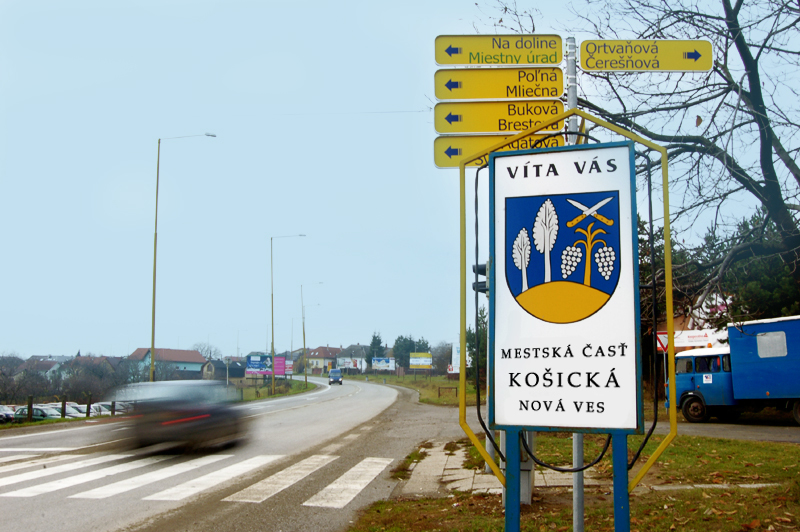
Municipality sign (November 2006)

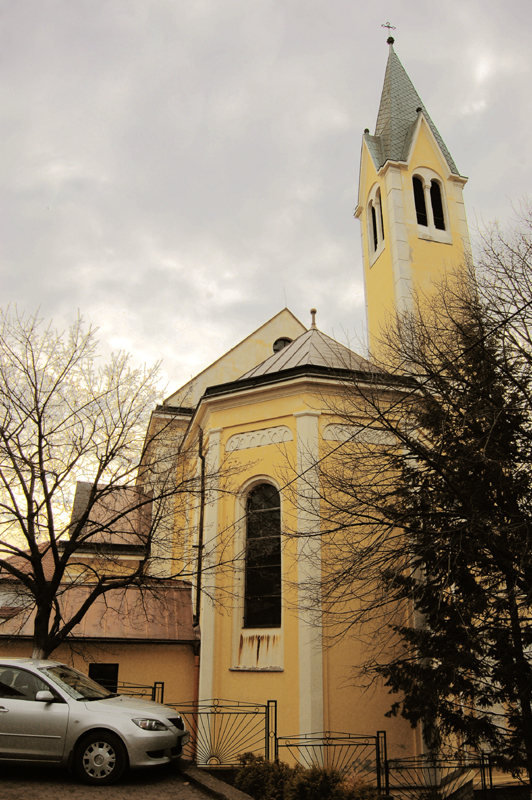
St. Ladislav's Church (November 2006)

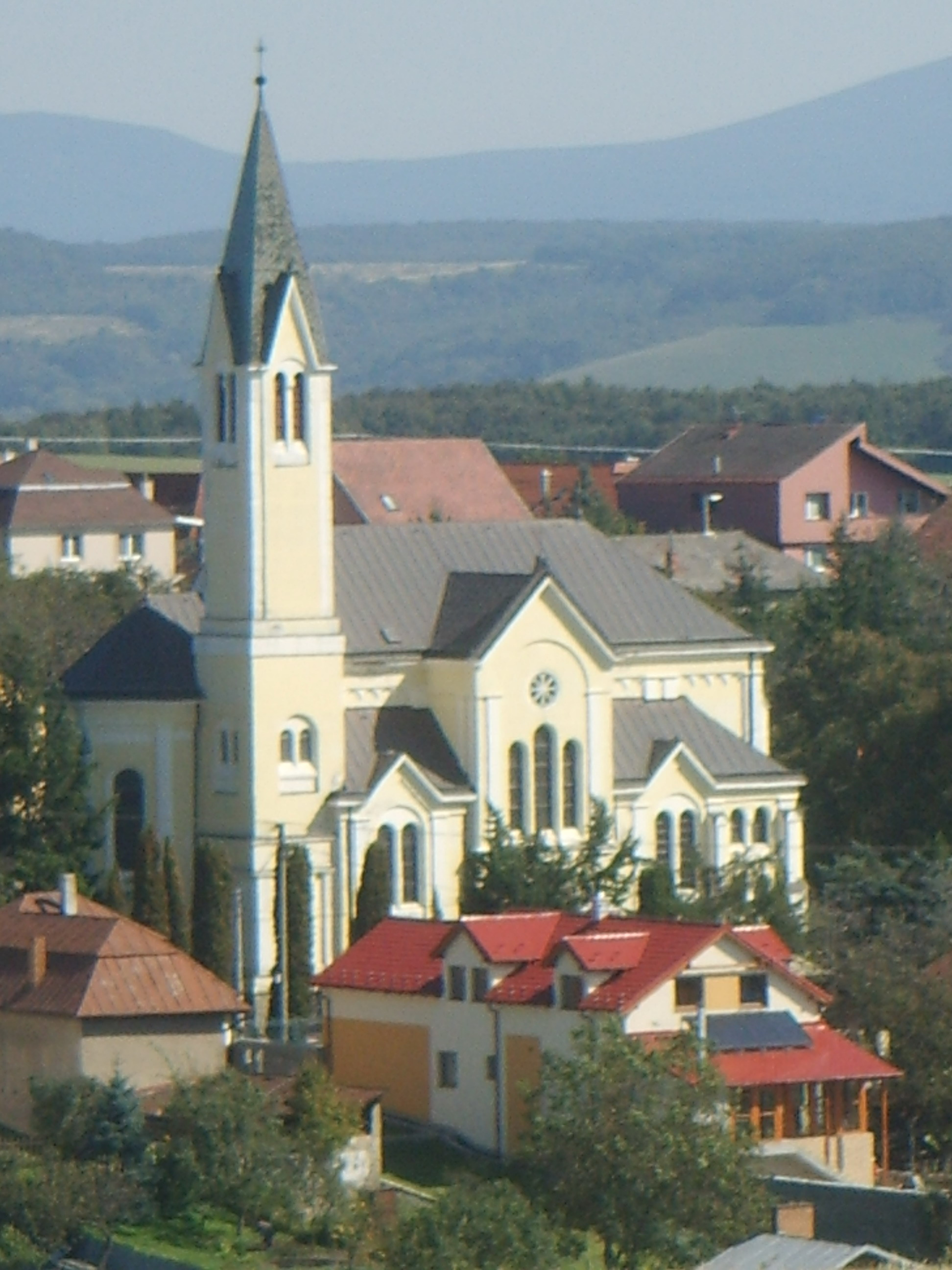
St. Ladislav's Church (September 2010)

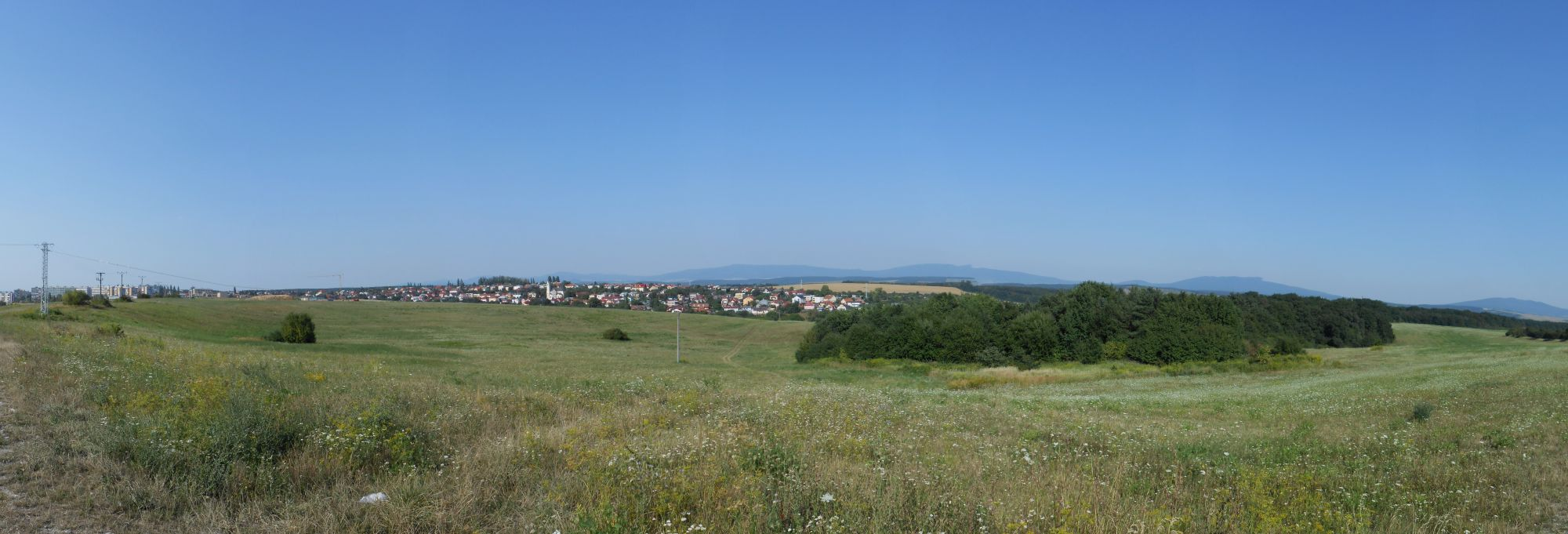
The panorama of the borough from the surrounding countryside (August 2015)

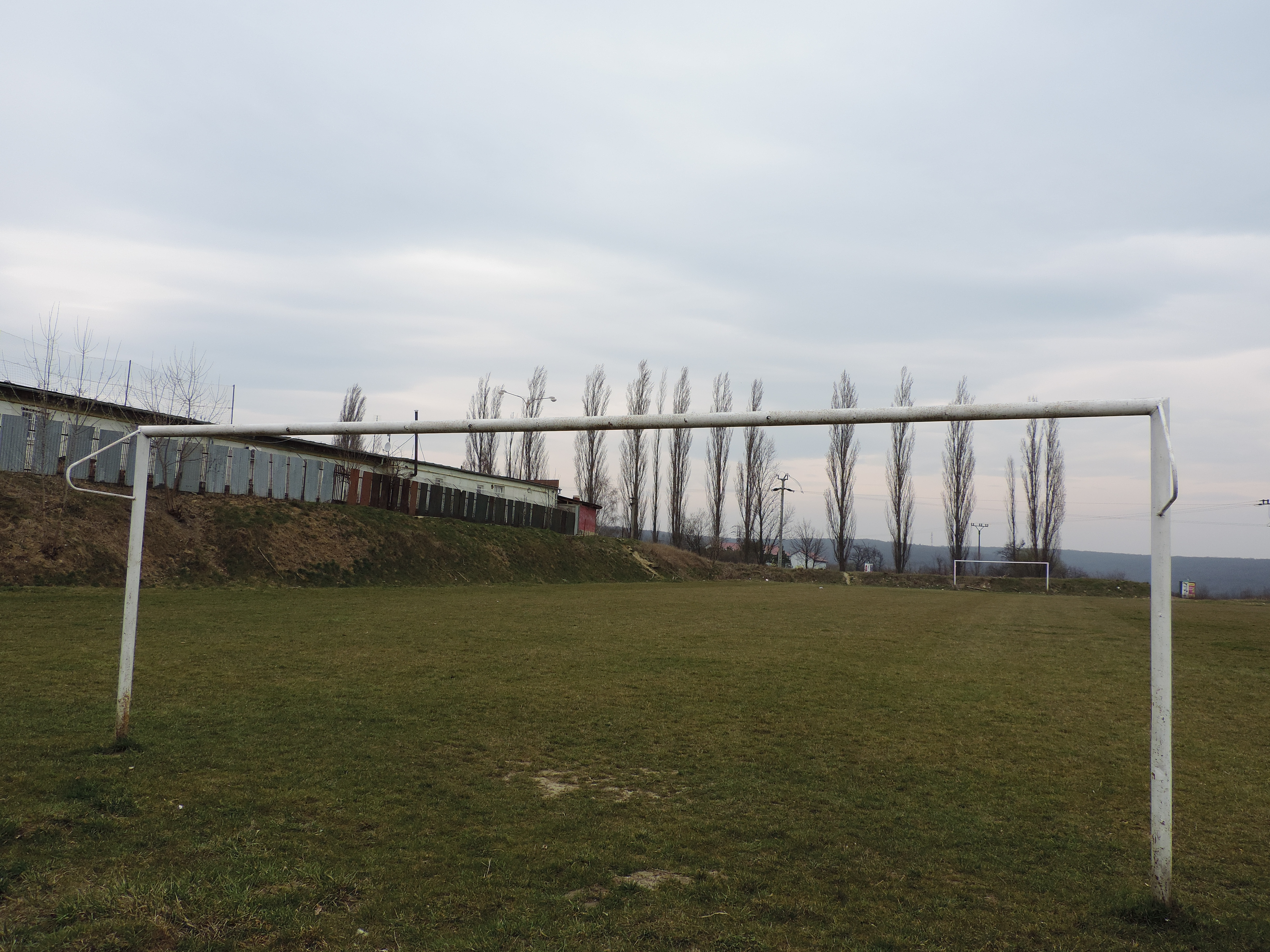
Football pitch in the borough (March 2014)
