= Rouvres-sous-Meilly =

- Commune
- Coat of arms
- Location of Rouvres-sous-Meilly
- Location within France Location within Bourgogne-Franche-Comté
- Coordinates: 47°12′48″N 4°34′45″E
- Country: France
- Region: Bourgogne-Franche-Comté
- Department: Côte-d'Or
- Arrondissement: Beaune
- Canton: Arnay-le-Duc

Government
  - Mayor (2020–2026): Marie-Bernadette Degouve de Nuncques
- Area^{1}: 4.43 km^{2} (1.71 sq mi)
- Elevation: 405 m (1,329 ft)
- Highest elevation: 424 m (1,391 ft)
- Lowest elevation: 358 m (1,175 ft)
- Population (2023): 83
  - Density: 19/km^{2} (49/sq mi)
- Time zone: UTC+01:00 (CET)
  - Summer (DST): UTC+02:00 (CEST)
- INSEE/Postal code: 21533 /21320
- ^{1} French Land Register data, which excludes lakes, ponds, glaciers > 1 km^{2} (0.386 sq mi or 247 acres) and river estuaries.

Rouvres-sous-Meilly (French pronunciation: [ʁuvʁ su mɛji], literally Rouvres under Meilly) is a commune in the Côte-d'Or department in eastern France.

== Population ==
Historical population
Year	Pop.	±% p.a.
1968	119	—
1975	114	−0.61%
1982	104	−1.30%
1990	93	−1.39%
1999	104	+1.25%
2007	102	−0.24%
2012	94	−1.62%
2017	89	−1.09%
2023	83	−1.16%
Source: INSEE

== See also ==
- Communes of the Côte-d'Or department
