= Košice III =

Coordinates: 48°43′59″N 21°17′53″E

Košice III District
- District
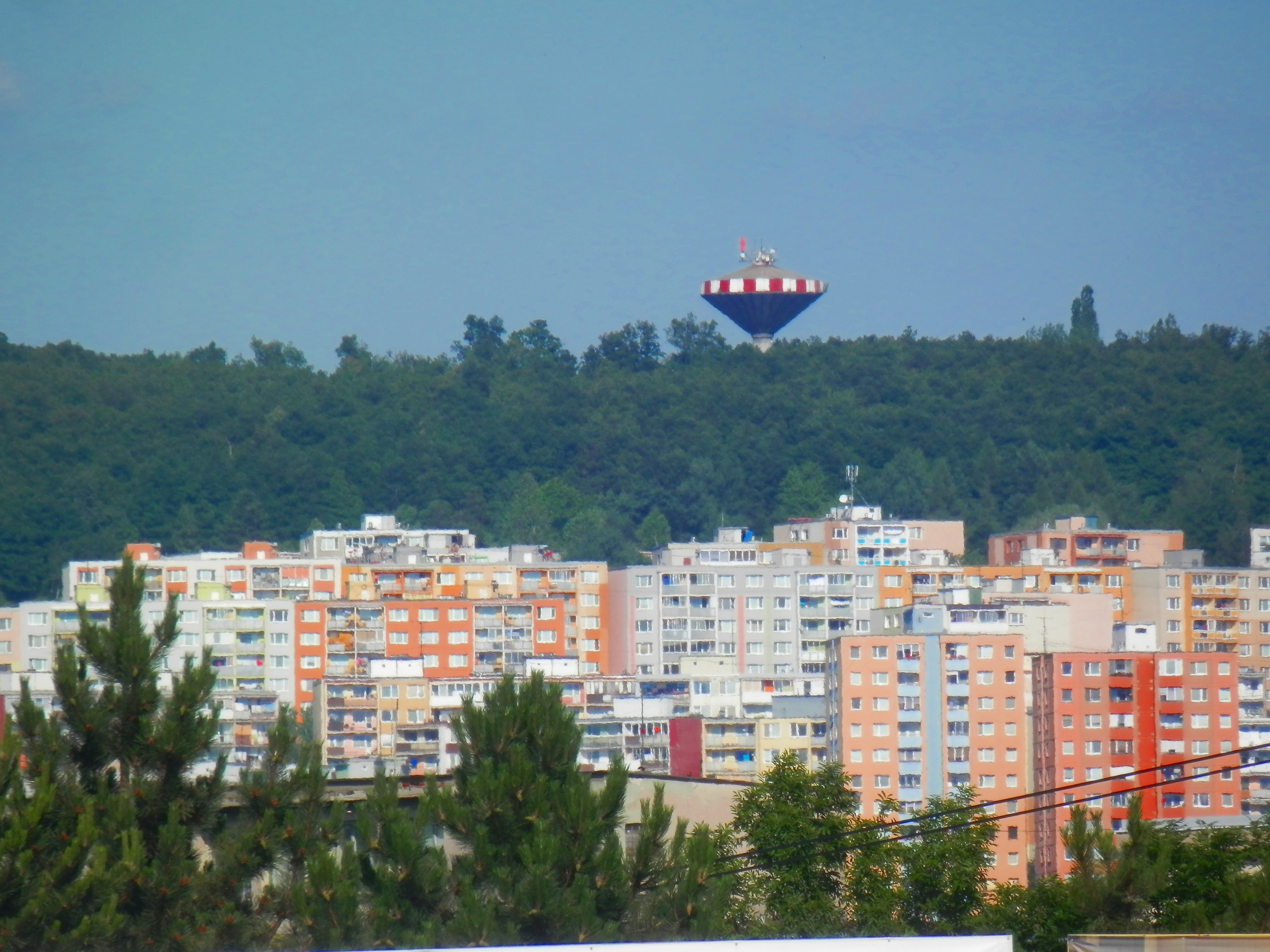
- Country: Slovakia
- Region (kraj): Košice Region
- Seat: Košice

Area
  - Total: 16.83 km^{2} (6.50 sq mi)

Population (2025)
  - Total: 26,964
- Time zone: UTC+1 (CET)
  - Summer (DST): UTC+2 (CEST)
- Telephone prefix: 055
- Vehicle registration plate (until 2022): KE, KC, KI
- Boroughs: 2

Košice III (Hungarian: Kassai III. járás) is a district in the Košice Region of eastern Slovakia, in the city of Košice. It is bordered by the Košice I, Košice IV and Košice-okolie districts. Until 1918, the district was mostly part of the Hungarian county of Abaúj-Torna.

== Population ==
Historical population
Year	Pop.	±%
1970	46,658	—
1980	19,985	−57.2%
1991	31,764	+58.9%
2001	30,745	−3.2%
2011	30,048	−2.3%
2021	28,135	−6.4%
Source: Censuses

Population statistic (10 years)
Year	1995	2005	2015	2025
Count	32,170	30,291	29,226	26,964
Difference		−5.84%	−3.51%	−7.73%

Population statistic
Year	2024	2025
Count	27,336	26,964
Difference		−1.36%

It has a population of 26,964 people (31 December 2025).

=== Ethnicity ===
Census 2021 (1+ %)
Ethnicity	Number	Fraction
Slovak	24,431	82.95%
Not found out	2760	9.37%
Hungarian	810	2.75%
Rusyn	531	1.8%
Total	29,452	

In year 2021 was 29,452 people by ethnicity 24,431 as Slovak, 2760 as Not found out, 810 as Hungarian, 531 as Rusyn, 261 as Romani, 220 as Czech, 125 as Other, 96 as Ukrainian, 60 as German, 44 as Russian, 22 as Polish, 14 as Jewish, 8 as Irish, 8 as English, 7 as Vietnamese, 7 as Bulgarian, 6 as Chinese, 6 as Moravian, 5 as Greek, 5 as Croatian, 4 as Turkish, 3 as Italian, 3 as Serbian, 3 as Silesian, 3 as Austrian, 3 as French, 3 as Albanian, 2 as Canadian, 1 as Romanian and 1 as Iranian.

Note on population: The difference values of population numbers in the table "Population statistic" and in the sections "Ethnicity" & "Religion" is caused by the use of various statistical methods.

=== Religion ===
Census 2021 (1+ %)
Religion	Number	Fraction
Roman Catholic Church	12,801	45.5%
None	7817	27.78%
Not found out	2972	10.56%
Greek Catholic Church	2095	7.45%
Evangelical Church	921	3.27%
Calvinist Church	521	1.85%
Eastern Orthodox Church	341	1.21%
Total	28,135	

In year 2021 was 28,135 people by religion 12,801 from Roman Catholic Church, 7817 from None, 2972 from Not found out, 2095 from Greek Catholic Church, 921 from Evangelical Church, 521 from Calvinist Church, 341 from Eastern Orthodox Church, 103 from Ad hoc movements, 89 from Apostolic Church, 84 from Other, 83 from Jehovah's Witnesses, 56 from Other and not ascertained christian church, 53 from Christian Congregations in Slovakia, 36 from Islam, 30 from Seventh-day Adventist Church, 26 from Buddhism, 25 from Paganism and natural spirituality, 22 from Baptists Church, 17 from United Methodist Church, 10 from Jewish community, 9 from Church of the Brethren, 6 from Old Catholic Church, 5 from Hinduism, 5 from Church of Jesus Christ of Latter-day Saints, 5 from Bahá'i Community, 2 from New Apostolic Church and 1 from Czechoslovak Hussite Church.

== Boroughs ==
Borough	Area [km^{2}]	Population
Dargovských hrdinov	7.35	23,822
Košická Nová Ves	9.47	3,142

Population and area values are current for year 2025.
