= Special Geographic Area =

Special Geographic Area Ligawasan Province (Note: Other name of the SGA used by the Moro Islamic Liberation Front. The SGA is not a legally recognized province.)
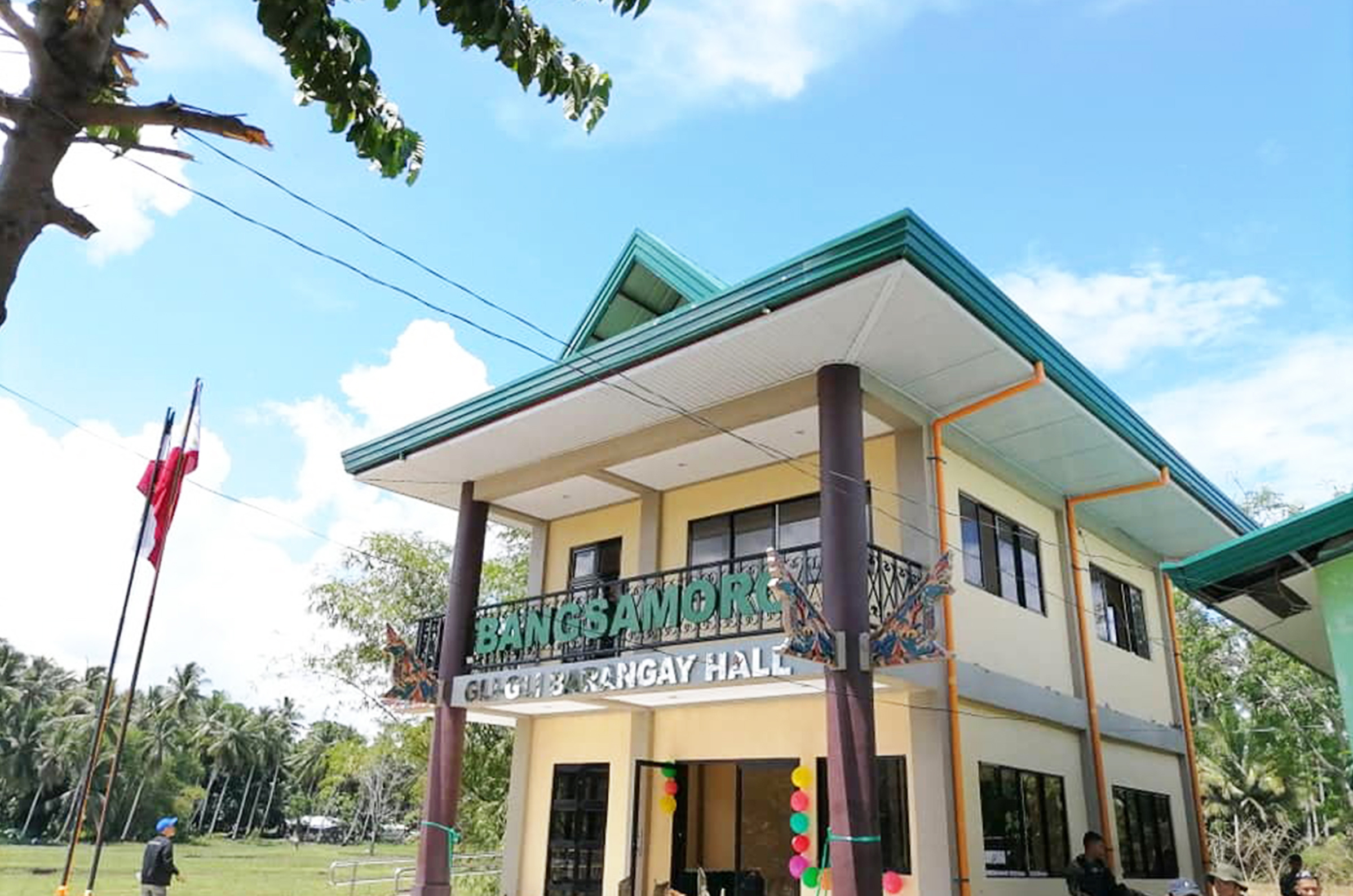
- The barangay hall of Gli-Gli in Ligawasan

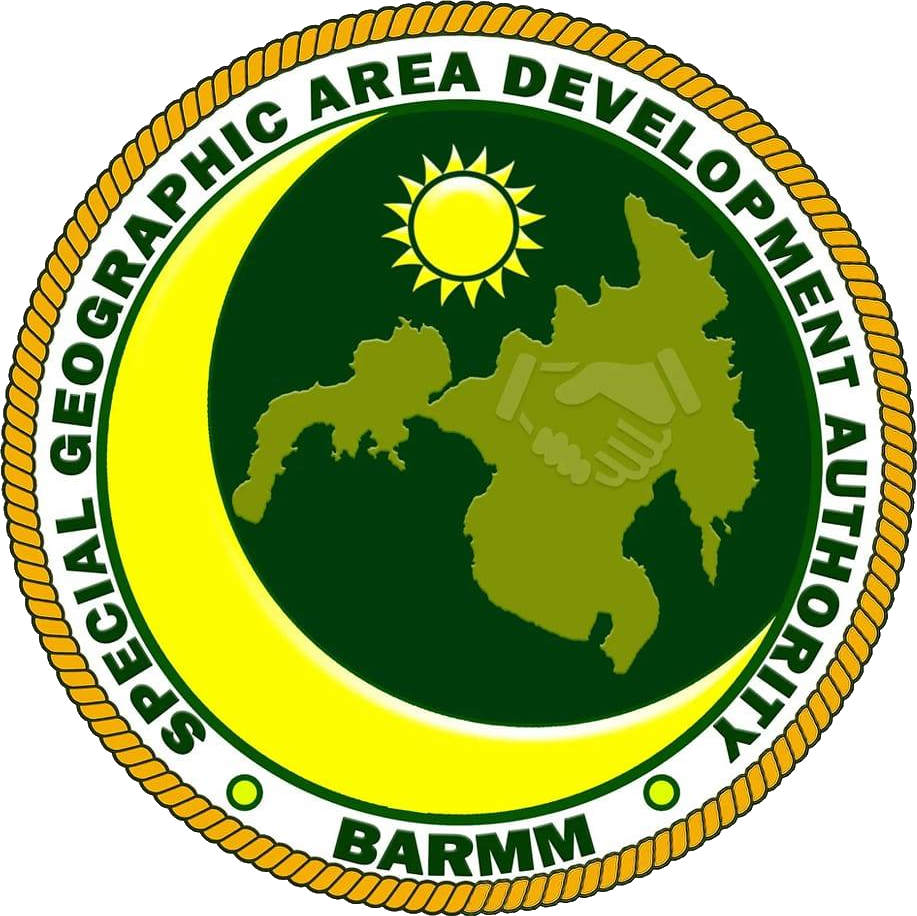
- Seal

- Areas of Cotabato included in the Special Geographic Area
- Country: Philippines
- Region: Bangsamoro
- Province: Cotabato (geographically only)
- Municipalities: Kadayangan; Kapalawan; Ligawasan; Malidegao; Nabalawag; Old Kaabakan; Pahamuddin; Tugunan
- Barangays: 63
- Plebiscite of Cotabato barangays to join Bangsamoro: February 6, 2019
- Foundation of the Special Geographic Area: February 14, 2019
- Turnover to Bangsamoro: November 20, 2019
- Municipality creation plebiscites: April 13, 2024

Government
  - Body: Special Geographic Area Development Authority
  - Administrator: Butch Panigel Malang

Area
  - Total: 824.311 km^{2} (318.268 sq mi)

Population (2024 census)
  - Total: 214,703
  - Density: 260.464/km^{2} (674.598/sq mi)

The Special Geographic Area (SGA) is a loose collection of 63 geographically non-contiguous barangays in eight municipalities in the province of Cotabato, Philippines. It is part of the Bangsamoro Autonomous Region in Muslim Mindanao (BARMM), despite Cotabato itself being part of the neighboring region of Soccsksargen.

These barangays were transferred from Soccsksargen to Bangsamoro following the two-phase plebiscite held in January and February 2019 that ratified the creation of the autonomous region, after residents voted in favor of inclusion in Bangsamoro. In 2024, the barangays were reorganized into eight municipalities following the municipality creation plebiscites. These municipalities may eventually be reorganized into a new province or merged with the adjacent provinces of Maguindanao del Norte or Maguindanao del Sur, both of which are part of Bangsamoro.

The Bangsamoro regional government formally assumed governance over the barangays following their official turnover by the Cotabato provincial government on November 20, 2019. Despite being part of Bangsamoro, the barangays and the municipalities later created from them remain geographically situated within Cotabato province.

Unlike the rest of Bangsamoro, the Special Geographic Area does not form a continuous territory. Instead, it consists of scattered barangays across Cotabato, some of which are exclaves entirely surrounded by territory outside the autonomous region.

== History ==
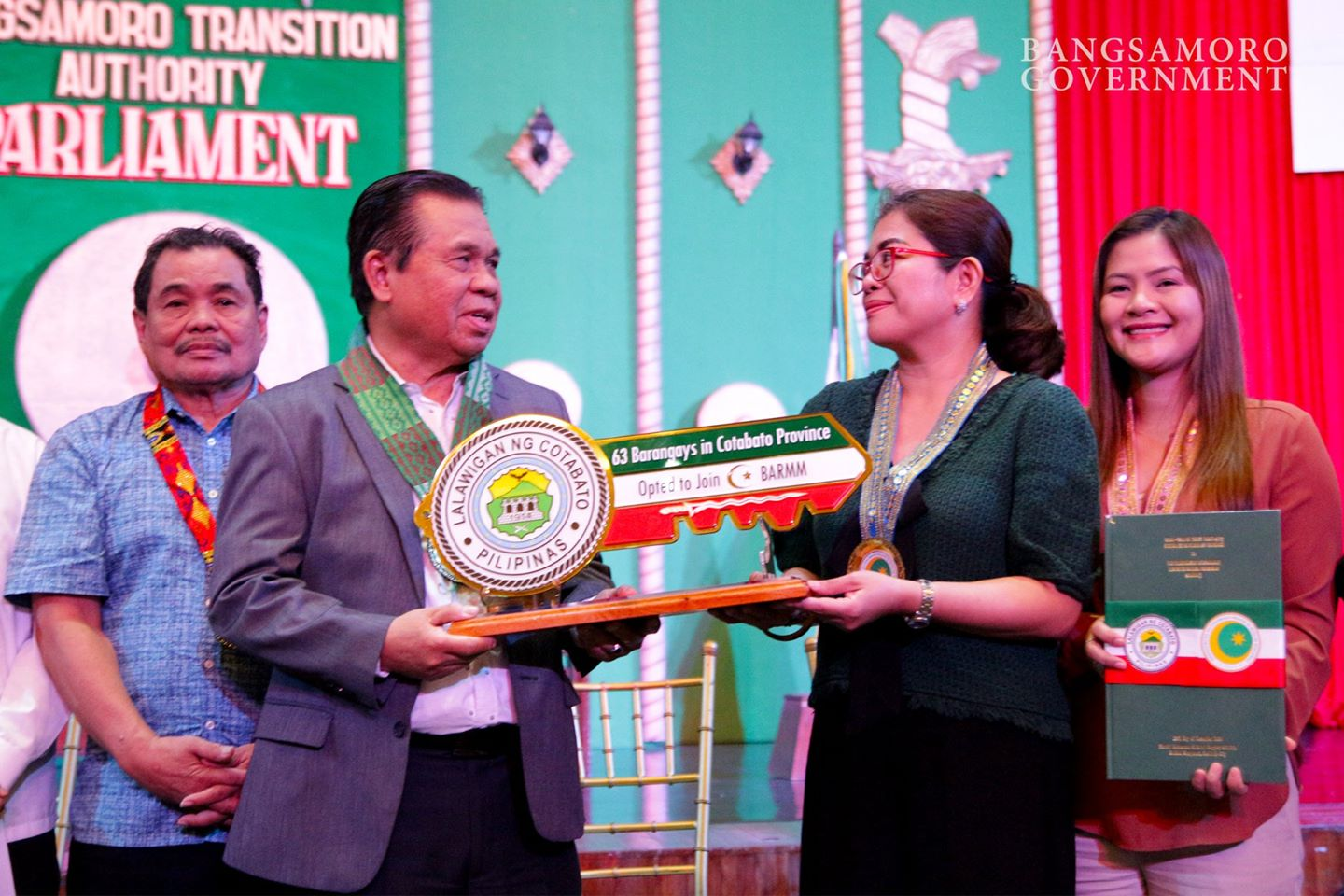
Turnover ceremony of the 63 barangays in Cotabato to the BARMM. November 20, 2019.

=== 2019 Bangsamoro creation plebiscite ===
The Philippine government organized a two-part plebiscite that concerns the ratification of the Bangsamoro Organic Law, the founding basis of the then-to-be established Bangsamoro Autonomous Region in Muslim Mindanao (BARMM), which was intended to replace the Autonomous Region in Muslim Mindanao (ARMM), and the expansion of the then-proposed Bangsamoro autonomous region to potentially include municipalities in Lanao del Norte, the cities of Isabela in Basilan and Cotabato in Maguindanao, and select barangays in Cotabato province. For the prospective barangays in Cotabato to join, voters in all of the parent municipalities also had to consent to their bid to join Bangsamoro.

Out of 67 barangays in Cotabato that were included in the plebiscite, 63 had successful bids for their inclusion in the Bangsamoro autonomous region. The four that rejected the measure are Galidan in Tulunan, Balatican in Pikit, and Pagangan and Lower Mingading in Aleosan; these four were excluded from BARMM and remained part of Soccsksargen. Meanwhile, each municipality consented to its barangays joining the BARMM. In Pikit, the most populous municipality in Cotabato, all but one barangay that voted in the plebiscite to join declined. This led to 20 barangays staying out of the BARMM out of 42. Pikit's town hall, which is located in Fort Pikit, one of the barangays that voted for inclusion, is being petitioned to be annexed by Poblacion, one of the towns that did not petition to be included.

The barangays in Aleosan and Tulunan voted in favor of their inclusion, but the majority of voters in the rest of their parent municipalities voted against the barangays' inclusion. Barangay Baltican in Pikit rejected their inclusion, while the rest of Pikit consented to the barangay's inclusion and would have been part of the new autonomous region if Baltican voters also voted for their inclusion.

Upon the effective foundation of the new Bangsamoro autonomous region, the barangays remained part of their parent municipalities. Their residents voted for municipal officials of their parent municipalities and Cotabato provincial officials in the 2019 Philippine general election. The barangays could be reorganized into one or more municipalities or merged with any of the neighboring municipalities in Maguindanao.

=== Transition period ===
The full transfer of jurisdiction of the Cotabato barangays to the Bangsamoro autonomous government was ordered by Secretary of the Interior and Local Government Eduardo Año following a meeting with Bangsamoro Chief Minister Murad Ebrahim on July 8, 2019.

These barangays were still not under the effective control of Bangsamoro as of July 2019 since they were not yet officially turned over to the Bangsamoro regional government, which was initially set to occur once a local government code was passed by the devolved Bangsamoro Parliament.

With the local government code still pending, the official turnover took place on November 20, 2019. The Sangguniang Panlalawigan of Cotabato has passed a resolution concerning the transfer. Amidst budgetary concerns, the barangays were assured that they will still receive their internal revenue allocation directly from the Department of Budget and Management after the transfer takes place.

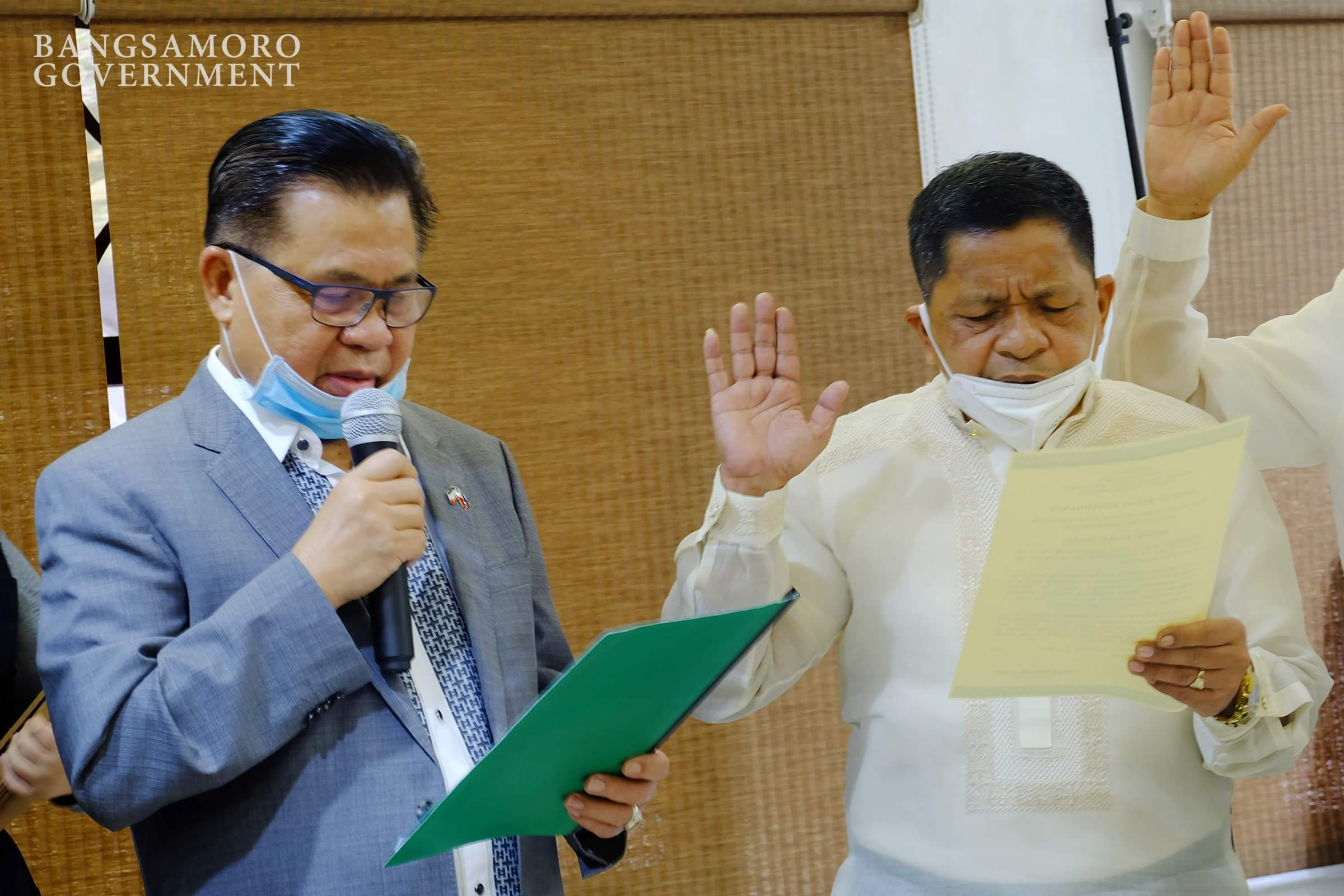
An official appointed to the Development Coordinating Office (DCO) taking their oath of moral governance on June 30, 2020, before Chief Minister Murad Ebrahim (left).

By March 2020, the 63 barangays had already been grouped into a special geographic area of the Bangsamoro region.

Chief Minister Murad Ebrahim issued an executive order establishing a Development Coordinating Office (DCO) led by an administrator and eight area coordinators to manage affairs in the 63 barangays in Cotabato. Mohammad Kelie Antao was appointed administrator on June 30, 2020. Jimmy Adil, Jabib Guiabar, Esmael Maguid, Duma Mascud, Ibrahim Rahman, Abdulatip Tiago, and Nayang Timan were appointed as area coordinators on the same date.

A second ceremony was held on December 15, 2020, to mark the symbolic assumption of the Bangsamoro regional government over the 63 Cotabato barangays along with Cotabato City.

=== 2024 municipality creation plebiscites ===
On August 17, 2023, the bills consolidating the barangays into 8 municipalities were approved by the Bangsamoro Parliament. Chief Minister Ebrahim signed the bills into law (Bangsamoro Act No. 41 to 48) on September 4, 2023.

A majority of residents in the would be eight municipalities ratified the legislations in a plebiscite held on April 13, 2024. Following the plebiscite, the BARMM regional government said that the Special Geographic Area would be retained pending the creation of a new province, while Chief Minister Murad Ebrahim would appoint officers-in-charge to lead the municipalities pending scheduled elections in 2025.

On May 1, 2024, an ad hoc screening and review committee was held to determine the towns' interim officials. On July 9, 2024, Ebrahim named the OIC officials.

=== Provincehood proposals ===
The Bangsamoro Parliament passed a resolution on September 27, 2024 urging the national Congress to pass a bill creating a proposed "Province of Kutawato" from the SGA. Robin Padilla in November 2024 filed Senate Bill No. 2875 in response. However, the Bangsamoro government instead proposed the name "Moro Province" to avoid confusion with Cotabato.

A 2024 report by political think tank Institute for Autonomy and Governance (IAG) asserted that the proposed new province may fail legal tests due to not meeting the provincial status criteria on land area, population, and income as set by the Local Government Code. IAG recommended annexation by neighboring Maguindanao del Norte as the legally feasible option, preferably after the first Bangsamoro elections. However, Antao's Bangsamoro Transition Authority Office noted that the proposed province has a larger population and wider "partly contiguous" land area than those of Biliran and Dinagat Islands, and the combined annual incomes of the eight municipalities is higher than the yearly income of Dinagat Islands.

== Geography ==
The Special Geographic Area consists of non-contiguous barangays of Bangsamoro located within Cotabato, a province of the Soccsksargen region. These barangays are scattered primarily across the Liguasan Marsh and the Nabalawag Mountains.

=== Administrative divisions ===
Political map of the Special Geographic Area Pahamuddin Kadayangan Nabalawag Old Kaabakan Kapalawan Malidegao Tugunan Ligawasan

Municipality	Population (2020)		Area		Density		Barangay
			km^{2}	sq mi	/km^{2}	/sq mi	
Kadayangan	11.9%	25,573	—	—	—	—	7
Kapalawan	13.2%	28,463	—	—	—	—	7
Ligawasan	13.8%	29,784	—	—	—	—	7
Malidegao	16.9%	36,438	—	—	—	—	7
Nabalawag	13.1%	28,239	—	—	—	—	7
Old Kaabakan	7.7%	16,658	—	—	—	—	7
Pahamuddin	9.1%	19,627	—	—	—	—	12
Tugunan	14.2%	30,651	—	—	—	—	9
Total		215,433	824.311	318.27	260	1,800	63

==== Former ====
Prior to the creation of the eight municipalities in 2024, the 63 barangays of the Special Geographic Area of Bangsamoro were grouped into eight area clusters.

== Governance ==
To facilitate the administration of the Special Geographic Area, the area was constituted as a single administrative unit under the direct supervision of the chief minister of Bangsamoro through the region's Ministry of the Interior and Local Government (MILG). The MILG oversees the area through the Special Geographic Area Development Authority (SGDA), which is headed by an administrator appointed by the chief minister.

The SGDA continued to supervise the barangays after the creation of the SGA municipalities in April 2024.

SGDA administrators

- Mohammad Kelie Antao (2020–2022)
- Butch Panigel Malang (2022–present)
