= Old Kaabakan =

Municipality in Cotabato province, Philippines

- Municipality
- Municipality of Old Kaabakan
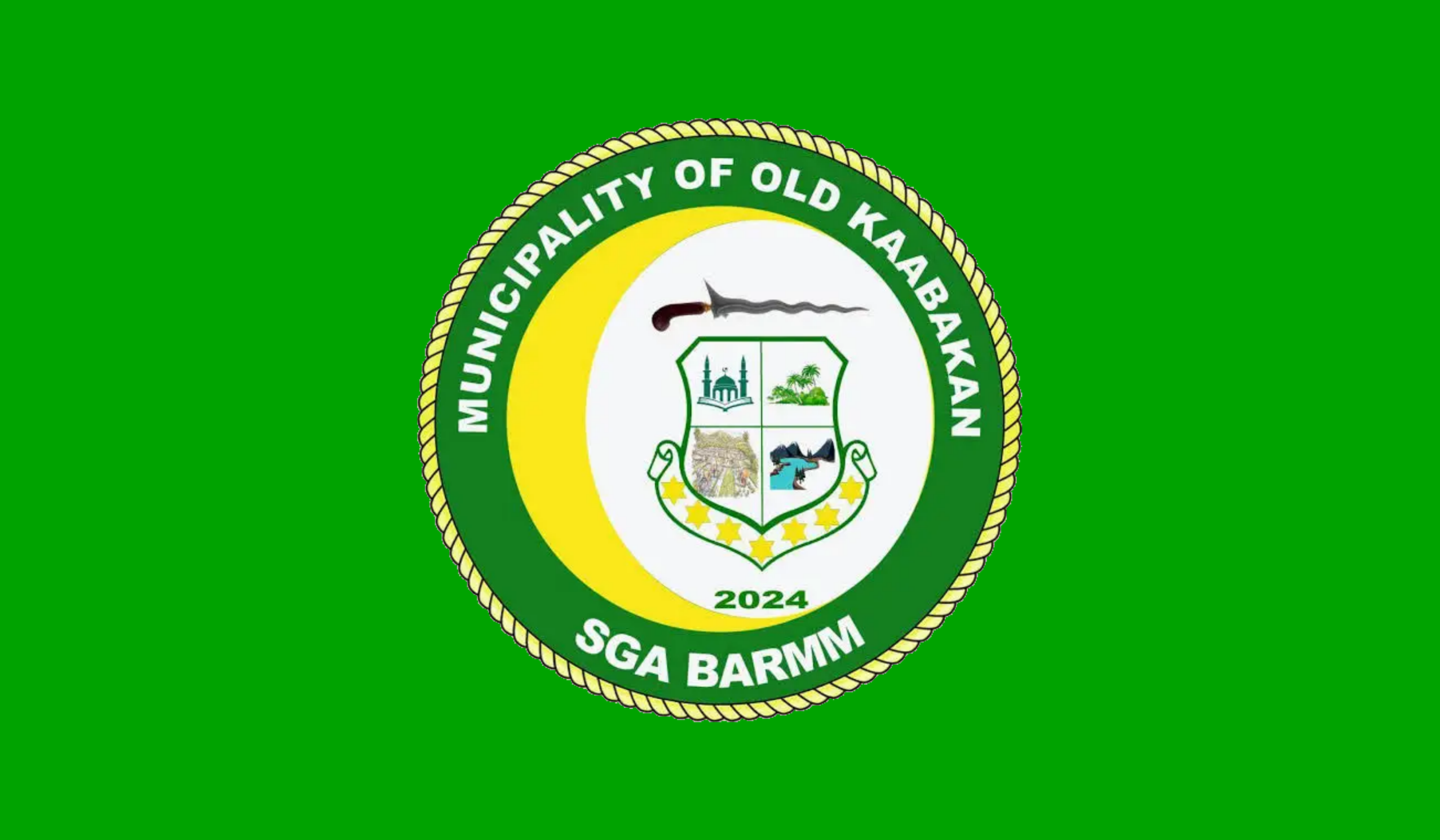
- Flag

- Map of Cotabato with Old Kaabakan highlighted

- Location within Philippines
- Country: Philippines
- Region: Special Geographic Area (Special Geographic Area)
- Province: Cotabato
- Parliamentary district: 2nd district
- Founded: April 13, 2024
- Barangays: 7 (see Barangays)

Government
  - Type: Sangguniang Bayan
  - Mayor: Tonicks Enalang
  - Vice Mayor: Meralyn Saguia
  - Electorate: 10,029 voters (2025)

Population (2024 census)
  - Total: 16,181
- Time zone: UTC+8 (PST)
- ZIP code: 9407
- PSGC: 1999902000

Old Kaabakan, officially the Municipality of Old Kaabakan (Maguindanaon: Inged nu Old Kaabakan, Jawi: ; Hiligaynon: Banwa sang Old Kaabakan; Cebuano: Lungsod sa Old Kaabakan; Tagalog: Bayan ng Lumang Kaabakan), is a municipality in the province of Cotabato, Philippines. The municipality is part of the Bangsamoro Autonomous Region in Muslim Mindanao despite Cotabato being part of Soccsksargen. According to the 2024 census, it had a population of 16,181.

== History ==
When the Bangsamoro was created in 2019 to supplant the Autonomous Region in Muslim Mindanao, 63 barangays in the province of Cotabato were grouped with the newer autonomous region in the second part of the plebiscite held in February 6. The mother municipalities and Cotabato province remained part of Soccsksargen.

By March 2020, these barangays were designated as a Special Geographic Area (SGA) of the Bangsamoro region.

On August 17, 2023, the bills consolidating the SGA barangays into eight municipalities were approved by the Bangsamoro Parliament, The particular bill creating Old Kaabakan was Bangsamoro Autonomy Act No. 44. Other proposals for the town's name included Northern Kabacan or Laya.

A plebiscite was held on April 13, 2024, and voters approved all eight bills reconstituting the SGA barangays to eight municipalities including Old Kaabakan, where 6,611 voted in favor of its creation while four voted against. The Bangsamoro regional government will provide P2.5 million in funding for the municipal government until it gets its share of income from the National Tax Allotment. Old Kaabakan was created from seven barangays of Kabacan.

== Geography ==
=== Barangays ===
Old Kaabakan is politically subdivided into seven barangays. Each barangay consists of puroks while some have sitios.

- Buluan
- Nangaan
- Pedtad
- Sanggadong
- Simbuhay
- Simone
- Tamped

== Demographics ==
Population census of Old Kaabakan
| Year | Pop. | ±% p.a. |
|---|---|---|
| 2024 | 16,181 | — |
Source: Philippine Statistics Authority

== Government ==
Officers-in-charge (OIC) was selected by BARMM Chief Minister Murad Ebrahim to fill positions in the municipal government pending regular elections in 2025. The municipality remains under the jurisdiction of the Special Geographic Area pending the creation of a new province.

Demat Kabembelan Pedtemanan was the OIC mayor of Old Kaabakan from 9 July 2024 to 30 June 2025.
