= Meilly-sur-Rouvres =

- Commune
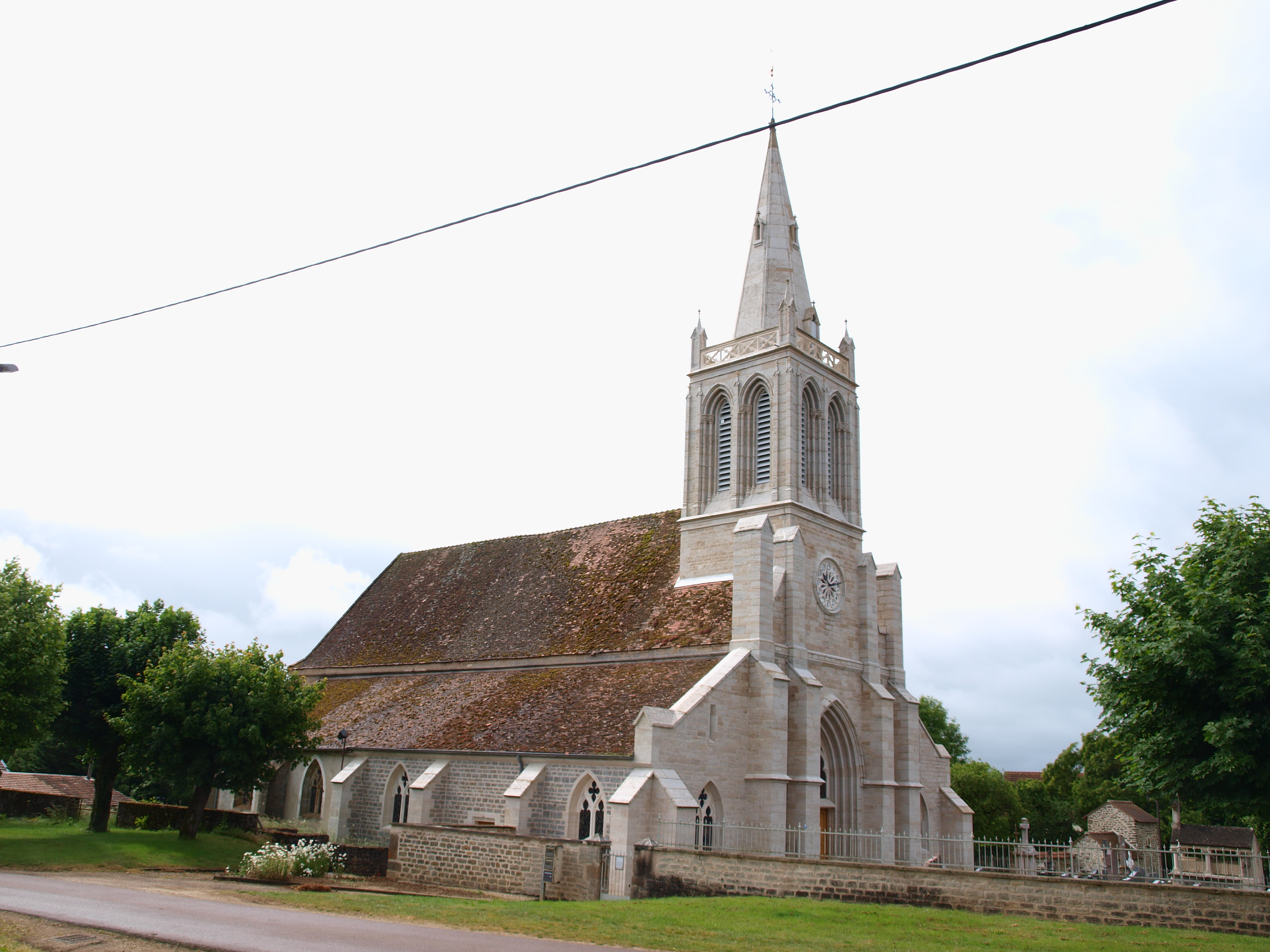
- The church in Meilly-sur-Rouvres
- Location of Meilly-sur-Rouvres
- Location within France Location within Bourgogne-Franche-Comté
- Coordinates: 47°12′27″N 4°33′48″E
- Country: France
- Region: Bourgogne-Franche-Comté
- Department: Côte-d'Or
- Arrondissement: Beaune
- Canton: Arnay-le-Duc

Government
  - Mayor (2020–2026): Joël Thomas
- Area^{1}: 14.91 km^{2} (5.76 sq mi)
- Elevation: 430 m (1,410 ft)
- Highest elevation: 454 m (1,490 ft)
- Lowest elevation: 375 m (1,230 ft)
- Population (2023): 230
  - Density: 15/km^{2} (40/sq mi)
- Time zone: UTC+01:00 (CET)
  - Summer (DST): UTC+02:00 (CEST)
- INSEE/Postal code: 21399 /21320
- ^{1} French Land Register data, which excludes lakes, ponds, glaciers > 1 km^{2} (0.386 sq mi or 247 acres) and river estuaries.

Meilly-sur-Rouvres (French pronunciation: [mɛji syʁ ʁuvʁ], literally Meilly on Rouvres) is a commune in the Côte-d'Or department in eastern France. The triple divide between the Loire, Rhône, and Seine basins lies within the commune.

== Population ==
Historical population
Year	Pop.	±% p.a.
1968	186	—
1975	180	−0.47%
1982	172	−0.65%
1990	163	−0.67%
1999	171	+0.53%
2007	180	+0.64%
2012	185	+0.55%
2017	197	+1.26%
2023	230	+2.61%
Source: INSEE

== See also ==
- Communes of the Côte-d'Or department
