= Kapalawan =

Municipality in Cotabato province, Philippines

- Municipality
- Municipality of Kapalawan
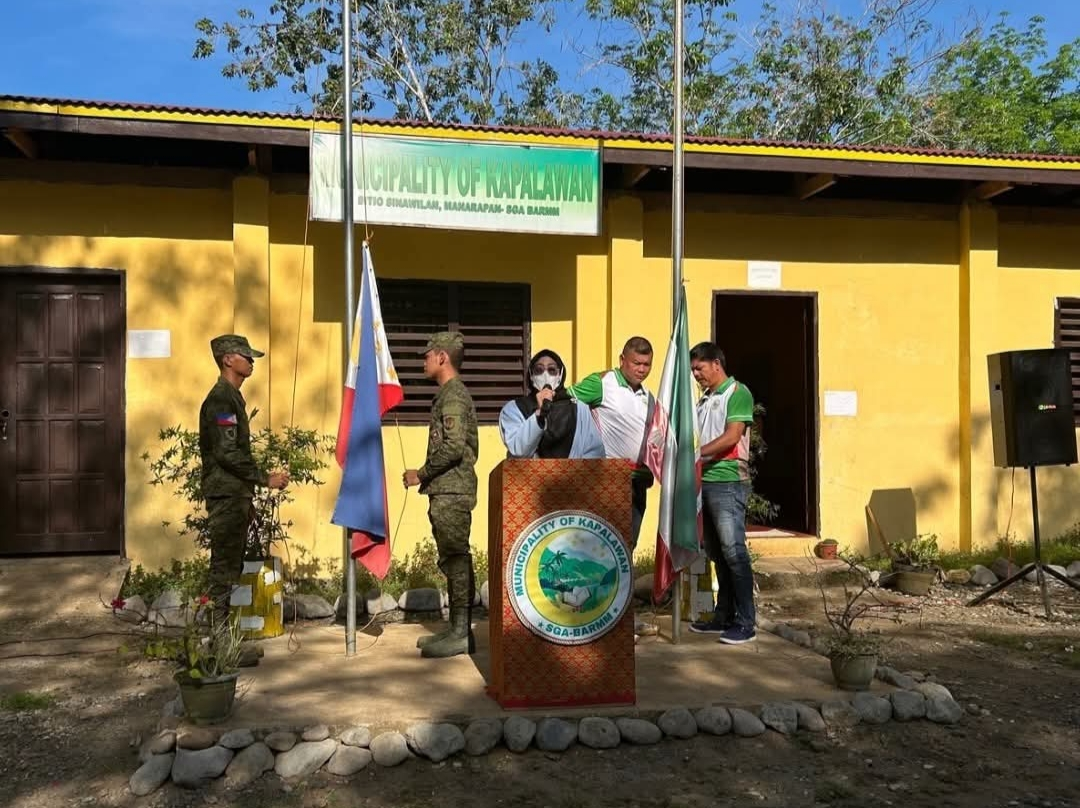
- Sitio Sinawilan in Kapalawan

- Map of Cotabato with Kapalawan highlighted

- Location within Philippines
- Country: Philippines
- Region: Special Geographic Area (Special Geographic Area)
- Province: Cotabato
- Parliamentary district: 2nd district
- Founded: April 13, 2024

Government
  - Type: Sangguniang Bayan
  - Mayor: Norman Cadi Inalang
  - Vice Mayor: Fhen Maguid
  - Electorate: 16,794 voters (2025)

Population (2024 census)
  - Total: 29,191
- Time zone: UTC+8 (PST)
- ZIP code: 9408
- PSGC: 1999901000

Kapalawan, officially the Municipality of Kapalawan (Maguindanaon: Inged nu Kapalawan, Jawi: ; Hiligaynon: Banwa sang Kapalawan; Cebuano: Lungsod sa Kapalawan; Tagalog: Bayan ng Kapalawan), is a municipality in the province of Cotabato, Philippines. The municipality is part of the Bangsamoro Autonomous Region in Muslim Mindanao despite Cotabato being part of Soccsksargen. According to the 2024 census, it had a population of 29,191.

== History ==
When the Bangsamoro was created in 2019 to supplant the Autonomous Region in Muslim Mindanao, 63 barangays in the province of Cotabato were grouped with the newer autonomous region in the second part of the plebiscite held in February 6. The mother municipalities and Cotabato province remained part of Soccsksargen.

By March 2020, these barangays were designated as a Special Geographic Area (SGA) of the Bangsamoro region.

On August 17, 2023, the bills consolidating the SGA barangays into eight municipalities were approved by the Bangsamoro Parliament, The particular bill creating Kapalawan was Bangsamoro Autonomy Act No. 45.

A plebiscite was held on April 13, 2024, and voters approved all eight bills reconstituting the SGA barangays to eight municipalities including Kapalawan, where 10,495 voted in favor of its creation while two voted against. The Bangsamoro regional government will provide P2.5 million in funding for the municipal government until it gets its share of income from the National Tax Allotment. Kapalawan was created from seven barangays of Carmen.

== Geography ==
=== Barangays ===
Kapalawan is politically subdivided into seven barangays. Each barangay consists of puroks while some have sitios.

- Kib-Ayao
- Kitulaan
- Langogan
- Manarapan
- Nasapian
- Pebpoloan
- Tupig

== Demographics ==
Population census of Kapalawan
Year	Pop.	±% p.a.
2024	29,191	—
Source: Philippine Statistics Authority

== Government ==
Officers-in-charge (OIC) was selected by BARMM Chief Minister Murad Ebrahim to fill positions in the municipal government pending regular elections in 2025. The municipality remains under the jurisdiction of the Special Geographic Area pending the creation of a new province.

Norman Cadi Inalang is the OIC mayor of Kapalawan since July 9, 2024,
