= Ligawasan =

Municipality in Cotabato province, Philippines

- Municipality
- Municipality of Ligawasan
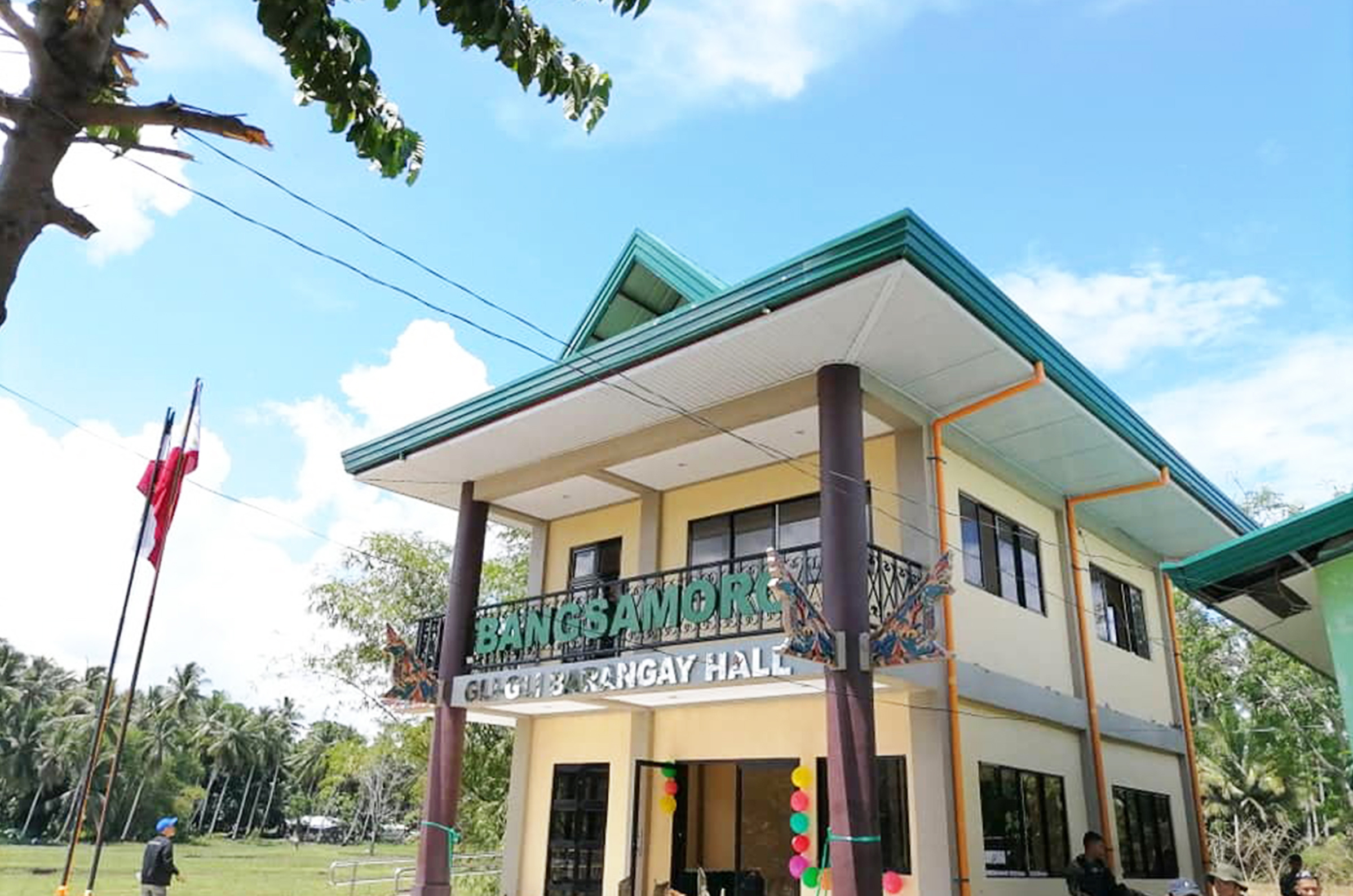

- Map of Cotabato with Ligawasan highlighted

- Location within Philippines
- Country: Philippines
- Region: Special Geographic Area (Special Geographic Area)
- Province: Cotabato
- Parliamentary district: 2nd district
- Founded: April 13, 2024
- Barangays: 7 (see Barangays)

Government
  - Type: Sangguniang Bayan
  - Mayor: Ismael Sultan Mama
  - Vice Mayor: Jenaida L. Abas
  - Municipal Council: Members: Luth A. Salik; Ruduan P. Makatidtang; Sittie M. Kambang; Mama A. Tingli; Abdulgani M. Manibpal; Alfatah D. Hussain; Ting N. Pananggilan; Ahmed O. Salik
  - Electorate: 19,167 voters (2025)

Population (2024 census)
  - Total: 28,322
- Time zone: UTC+8 (PST)
- ZIP code: 9409
- PSGC: 1999907000

Ligawasan, officially the Municipality of Ligawasan (Maguindanaon: Inged nu Ligawasan, Jawi: ; Hiligaynon: Banwa sang Ligawasan; Cebuano: Lungsod sa Ligawasan; Tagalog: Bayan ng Ligawasan), is a municipality in the province of Cotabato, Philippines. The municipality is part of the Bangsamoro Autonomous Region in Muslim Mindanao despite Cotabato being part of Soccsksargen. According to the 2024 census, it had a population of 28,322.

== History ==
When the Bangsamoro was created in 2019 to supplant the Autonomous Region in Muslim Mindanao, 63 barangays in the province of Cotabato were grouped with the newer autonomous region in the second part of the plebiscite held in February 6. The mother municipalities and Cotabato province remained part of Soccsksargen.

By March 2020, these barangays were designated as a Special Geographic Area (SGA) of the Bangsamoro region.

On August 17, 2023, the bills consolidating the SGA barangays into eight municipalities were approved by the Bangsamoro Parliament, The particular bill creating Ligawasan was Bangsamoro Autonomy Act No. 48.

A plebiscite was held on April 13, 2024, and voters approved all eight bills reconstituting the SGA barangays to eight municipalities including Ligawasan, where 11,788 voted in favor of its creation while none voted against. The Bangsamoro regional government will provide ₱2.5 million in funding for the municipal government until it gets its share of income from the National Tax Allotment. Ligawasan was created from seven barangays of Pikit.

== Geography ==
=== Barangays ===
Ligawasan is politically subdivided into seven barangays. Each barangay consists of puroks while some have sitios.

- Bagoaingud (Bagoinged)
- Barungis
- Buliok
- Bulol
- Gli-gli
- Kabasalan
- Rajah Muda

== Demographics ==
Population census of Ligawasan
Year	Pop.	±% p.a.
2024	28,322	—
Source: Philippine Statistics Authority

== Government ==
Officers-in-charge (OIC) were selected by Bangsamoro Chief Minister Murad Ebrahim to fill positions in the municipal government pending regular elections in 2025. The municipality remains under the jurisdiction of the Special Geographic Area pending the creation of a new province.

Ismael Sultan Mama is the mayor of Ligawasan since June 30, 2025. He previously served as OIC at the creation of the municipality.
