= Malidegao =

Municipality in Cotabato province, Philippines

- Municipality
- Municipality of Malidegao
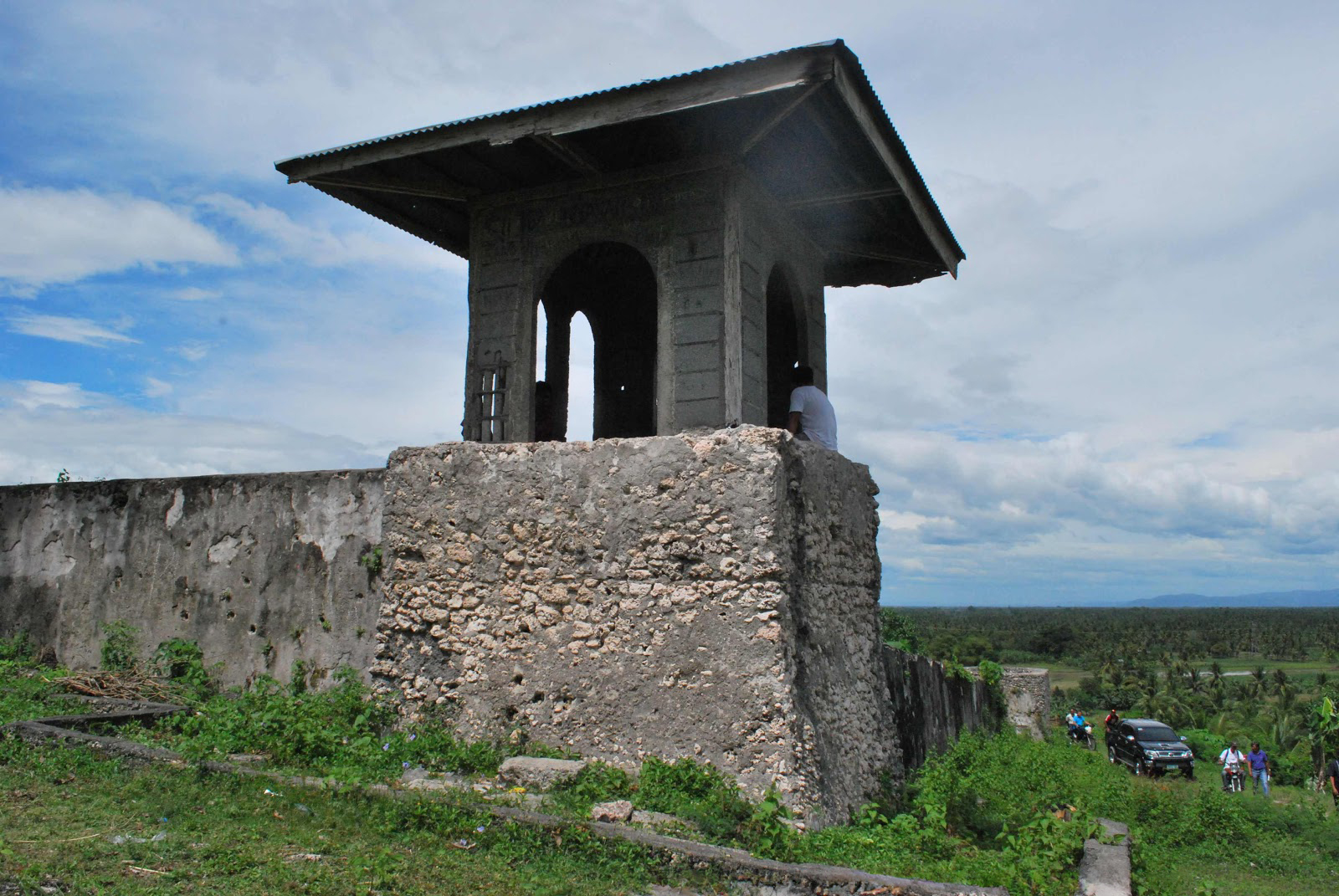
- Fort Pikit

- Map of Cotabato with Malidegao highlighted

- Location within Philippines
- Country: Philippines
- Region: Special Geographic Area (Special Geographic Area)
- Province: Cotabato
- Parliamentary district: 2nd district
- Founded: April 13, 2024

Government
  - Type: Sangguniang Bayan
  - Mayor: Arnal Malaidan Timan
  - Vice Mayor: Omar Mongkal
  - Electorate: 19,242 voters (2025)

Population (2024 census)
  - Total: 36,427
- Time zone: UTC+8 (PST)
- ZIP code: 9409
- PSGC: 1999906000

Malidegao, officially the Municipality of Malidegao (Maguindanaon: Inged nu Malidegao, Jawi: ; Hiligaynon: Banwa sang Malidegao; Cebuano: Lungsod sa Malidegao; Tagalog: Bayan ng Malidegao), is a municipality in the province of Cotabato, Philippines. The municipality is part of the Bangsamoro Autonomous Region in Muslim Mindanao despite Cotabato being part of Soccsksargen. According to the 2024 census, it had a population of 36,427.

== History ==
When the Bangsamoro was created in 2019 to supplant the Autonomous Region in Muslim Mindanao, 63 barangays in the province of Cotabato were grouped with the newer autonomous region in the second part of the plebiscite held in February 6. The mother municipalities and Cotabato province remained part of Soccsksargen.

By March 2020, these barangays were designated as a Special Geographic Area (SGA) of the Bangsamoro region.

On August 17, 2023, the bills consolidating the SGA barangays into eight municipalities were approved by the Bangsamoro Parliament, The particular bill creating Malidegao was Bangsamoro Autonomy Act No. 46. The town was initially proposed to be named as Malmar, but this was changed to Madridagao (and later Malidegao) to better reflect the area's culture and heritage.

A plebiscite was held on April 13, 2024, and voters approved all eight bills reconstituting the SGA barangays to eight municipalities including Malidegao, where 12,255 voted in favor of its creation while 44 voted against. The Bangsamoro regional government will provide P2.5 million in funding for the municipal government until it gets its share of income from the National Tax Allotment. Malidegao was created from seven barangays of Pikit.

== Geography ==
=== Barangays ===
Malidegao is politically subdivided into seven barangays. Each barangay consists of puroks while some have sitios.

- Balungis
- Batulawan
- Fort Pikit
- Gokotan
- Nabundas
- Nalapaan
- Nunguan

== Demographics ==
Population census of Malidegao
Year	Pop.	±% p.a.
2024	36,427	—
Source: Philippine Statistics Authority

== Government ==
Officers-in-charge (OIC) was selected by BARMM Chief Minister Murad Ebrahim to fill positions in the municipal government pending regular elections in 2025. The municipality remains under the jurisdiction of the Special Geographic Area pending the creation of a new province.

Arnal Malaidan Timan is the OIC mayor of Malidegao since July 9, 2024,
