= 2019 Bangsamoro autonomy plebiscite =

2019 plebiscite that ratified the Bangsamoro Organic Law

- February 6, 2019
- Bangsamoro Organic Law (BOL) Plebiscite
- Outcome: Bangsamoro Organic Law ratified, creating the Bangsamoro; Sulu was included as part of the Bangsamoro despite its voters rejecting the BOL; Sulu was later ruled not to be part of the Bangsamoro by the Supreme Court in 2024; Cotabato City approved inclusion in the Bangsamoro; 63 barangays in Cotabato approved and were allowed to join the Bangsamoro; Isabela City rejected inclusion in the Bangsamoro; Six municipalities in Lanao del Norte were not included in the Bangsamoro

Results
Choice	Votes	%
Yes	1,540,017	88.57%
No	198,750	11.43%
Valid votes	1,738,767	100.00%
Invalid or blank votes	0	0.00%
Total votes	1,738,767	100.00%
Registered voters/turnout	1,980,441	87.8%

Cotabato City joining the Bangsamoro
Yes	59.48%
No	40.52%

Isabela City joining the Bangsamoro
Yes	45.89%
No	54.11%
- Results by locality
- Yes: 50–60% 60–70% 70–80% No: 50–60% 60–70% 70–80% Figures above only show votes for the ratification of the Bangsamoro Organic Law (BOL) and exclude votes for joining the Bangsamoro Autonomous Region in Muslim Mindanao (BARMM). The map shows the results of the first round of the plebiscite. The Autonomous Region in Muslim Mindanao voted for the ratification of the BOL, and Cotabato City (inset) voted for inclusion in the BARMM, while Isabela City in Basilan voted against. Note that voters in the rest of Basilan also had to consent to Isabela City being included in the BARMM, in addition to voters in Isabela City itself.

The 2019 Bangsamoro autonomy plebiscite was a two-part plebiscite held in parts of Mindanao, Philippines, that ratified the Bangsamoro Organic Law (BOL), replaced the Autonomous Region in Muslim Mindanao (ARMM) with the Bangsamoro Autonomous Region in Muslim Mindanao (BARMM), and determined the scope of the new autonomous region.

Under the BOL, the plebiscite was required to be held no earlier than 90 days and no later than 150 days after the law was signed on July 26, 2018. The first part of the plebiscite was held on January 21, 2019. Voters in the ARMM voted on the ratification of the BOL, while voters in Cotabato City and Isabela City voted on whether their respective cities would be included in the proposed autonomous region. The second part was held on February 6, 2019, to determine whether the region would be expanded further. Voters in six municipalities in Lanao del Norte and 67 barangays in Cotabato province voted on whether their localities would be included in the BARMM.

On January 25, 2019, the Commission on Elections (COMELEC) announced that the BOL was "deemed ratified" after results from the first part of the plebiscite showed majority support for the law. The election body also announced that a majority of voters in Cotabato City had voted in favor of joining the proposed autonomous region, while voters in Isabela City had rejected inclusion.

In the February 6 plebiscite, voters in 63 of the 67 barangays in Cotabato province voted in favor of joining the proposed region. In Lanao del Norte, voters in 9 of the province's 22 municipalities voted in favor of inclusion, including the six municipalities (Balo-i, Munai, Nunungan, Pantar, Tagoloan, and Tangcal) that had petitioned to join the proposed region. However, unlike the Cotabato barangays, whose inclusion was determined by the vote in the municipalities to which they belonged, the inclusion of the six municipalities in Lanao del Norte also required a majority of voters throughout the province to approve their inclusion. The province-wide vote rejected their inclusion, and consequently none of the six municipalities joined the autonomous region. All 63 Cotabato barangays where voters approved inclusion, meanwhile, became part of the BARMM.

On September 9, 2024, the Supreme Court upheld the validity of the Bangsamoro Organic Law but declared unconstitutional the provision treating the provinces of the former ARMM as a single unit for purposes of determining ratification. Because a majority of voters in Sulu had rejected ratification of the law in the 2019 plebiscite, the court ruled that Sulu was not part of the BARMM.

== Scope ==
=== Bangsamoro 'core' territory ===
Voters in localities referred to as the core territory of the proposed Bangsamoro Autonomous Region were eligible to participate in the plebiscite. The core territory covers:

- Current territory of the Autonomous Region in Muslim Mindanao
- Isabela City in Basilan
- Cotabato City
- 6 municipalities in Lanao del Norte (*) — Nunungan, Tangcal, Munai, Pantar, Balo-i and Tagoloan
- 39 barangays in Cotabato (*)
  - Aleosan (3) — Dunguan, Lower Mingading and Tapodoc
  - Carmen (2) — Manarapan and Nasapian
  - Kabacan (3) — Nanga-an, Simbuhay and Sanggadong
  - Midsayap (12) — Damatulan, Kadigasan, Kadingilan, Kapinpilin, Kudarangan, Central Labas, Malingao, Mudseng, Nabalawag, Olandang, Sambulawan and Tugal
  - Pigcawayan (8) — Lower Baguer, Balacayon, Buricain, Datu Binasing, Kadingilan, Matilac, Patot and Lower Pangangkalan
  - Pikit (11) — Bangoinged, Balatican, S. Balong, S. Balongis, Batulawan, Buliok, Gokotan, Kabasalan, Lagunde, Macabual and Macasendeg

Voters in the whole provinces of Lanao del Norte and Cotabato also had to vote if they consented to a locality's secession from the regions of their parent provinces (Northern Mindanao and Soccsksargen, respectively) to join the proposed Bangsamoro Autonomous Region.

=== Other areas ===
Additionally, adjacent local government units bordering the localities above could opt for inclusion in the plebiscite through their local governments or a petition by its registered voters. The Comelec released guidelines regarding this concern on October 22, 2018 and gave local government units seeking this course of action until October 31, 2018 to comply. Voters or the local government of the petitioning locality had to pay a ₱10,000 filing fee and a ₱100 research fee as imposed by the election body.

A total of 62 localities was initially announced to have made bids to participate in the plebiscite, although not all of them were contiguous to the defined Bangsamoro core territory. Fifty-six of these petitions were initiated by local governments while six were made by registered voters of the petitioning localities. The Comelec planned to decide on all of these petitions initially by mid-November 2018 but later moved their target to December 15, 2018. Due to the large number of petitions, the Comelec decided on December 7, 2018 to schedule the planned plebiscite on two separate dates (January 21 and February 6, 2019) stating that they could not process all petitions by December 15 with localities with successful petitions taking part in the February vote.

A total of 103 petitions were filed, but only 28 were accepted. Petitions not accepted were either due to the petitioning locality not being adjacent to the defined core territory of the proposed Bangsamoro Autonomous Region or failure to submit sufficient requirements for their bid to get included in the plebiscite. Voters from the 28 accepted barangays were permitted to participate in the February polling.

==== Approved additional areas ====
By early January 2019, the Comelec has approved the petition of 20 barangays in Cotabato:

- Aleosan (1) — Pagangan
- Carmen (5) — Pebpoluan, Kibayao, Kitulaan, Tupig, and Langogan
- Pigcawayan (4) — Libungan Torreta, Pangankalan, Datu Mantil, and Simsiman
- Pikit (10) — Rajahmuda, Barungis, Gli-Gli, Nalapaan, Panicupan, Bualan, Nabundas, Nunguan, Manaulanan, and Bulol

On January 11, 2019, the Comelec announced the final list of additional participating localities for the plebiscite. The petitions of eight more barangays, all from Cotabato, were approved by the election body.

- Pikit (2) — Pamalian and Fort Pikit
- Kabacan (4) — Pedtad, Buluan, Simone, and Tamped
- Midsayap (1) — Tumbras
- Tulunan (1) — Galidan

==== Unapproved petitions ====
At least twelve localities in Zamboanga del Sur filed petitions for their participation in the plebiscite. Three island barangays of Zamboanga City also reportedly filed petitions, a supposed move which was condemned by city mayor Maria Isabelle Climaco. The barangay captains of the three Zamboanga City barangays later denied filing petitions.

== Preparations ==
=== Voters' registration ===
The Commission on Elections (Comelec) conducted a three-day satellite voter registration in select venues in the constituent provinces of the Autonomous Region in Muslim Mindanao as well as in the provinces of Lanao del Norte and Cotabato, and in the cities of Cotabato and Isabela, Basilan from September 11 to 13, 2018. Alongside with voter's registration, residents were able to transfer, reactivate, or correct their registration, as well as have their records included or reinstated. Those who had registered for the most recent barangay and Sanggunian Kabataan elections were not required to undergo the registration process. Fifteen satellites centers were set by the Comelec, one of which was in a camp controlled by the rebel group Moro Islamic Liberation Front (MILF), which played a major part in the conception of the BOL. MILF members were also among those who registered for the plebiscite, some of whom lacked government-issued IDs such as birth certificates. Despite this, their own self-issued identification documents were accepted as valid IDs for the purpose of registration.

The Comelec recorded a total of 2,839,659 registered voters from 3,273 in certain areas in Mindanao and expected a 75% turn-out for the vote.

=== Campaign and plebiscite period ===
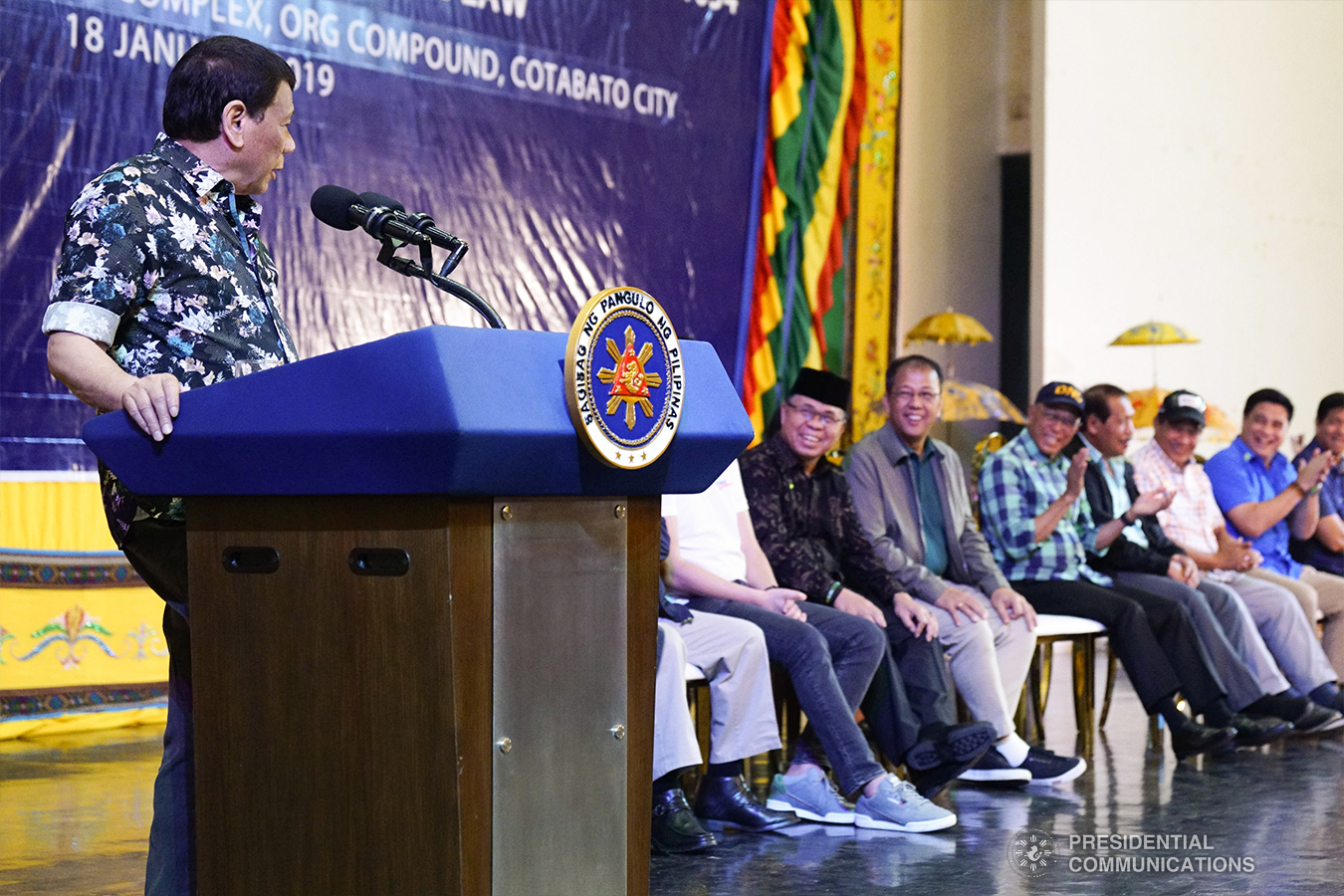
President Rodrigo Duterte speaks at the Peace Assembly for the Ratification of the Bangsamoro Organic Law at the Shariff Kabunsuan Cultural Complex Compound in Cotabato City on January 18, 2019.

The campaign period for the Bangsamoro Autonomous Region creation plebiscite began on December 7, 2018 and ended on January 19, 2019, while the plebiscite period was scheduled to be held between December 7, 2018 to February 5, 2019. The voting for the plebiscite took place on January 21, 2019 as per an en banc decision by the Commission on Elections.

During the campaign period, a gun ban was imposed in localities set to participate in the plebiscite. During the same period, the following acts were also prohibited: the establishment of a new voting precinct or alteration of the territory of an existing one, the transfer or detail of officers and civil service employees, the organization and maintenance of "strike forces" or similar entities, and the suspension of any elective public official from the barangay to the provincial level including elective officials in independent cities.

The Comelec was also tasked to aid in holding information campaigns in every participating local government unit as well as allow the conduct of information dissemination and public advocacy events by other government agencies, non-government organizations and private individuals in relation to the plebiscite. Every barangay was also directed to hold at least one assembly during the campaign period informing constituents on matters regarding the BOL.

On January 6, 2019, a rally was organized in Jolo, Sulu as an expression of support to the ratification of the BOL which was attended by former Sulu governor Benjamin Loong as well as former and incumbent mayors of some of the towns of Sulu. Similar actions were planned in Basilan, Tawi-Tawi, and other parts of Sulu.

There was also reluctance or opposition against the ratification of the BOL. In Basilan, officials of Isabela City actively campaigned against their city's inclusion in the proposed region. ARMM Governor Mujiv Hataman allayed concerns of Christians living in the city regarding potential marginalization should their city become part of the new autonomous region reasoning that the neighboring town of Lamitan has been governed by Christians despite being part of the ARMM. Hataman also said that Christian practices such as fiestas and eating pork would not be made illegal should the BOL be ratified contrary to what people against the legislation is saying in their campaign. Basilan Governor Jim Hataman on his part claimed that the BOL is a "sure win" in his province. Meanwhile, Cotabato City Mayor Cynthia Guiani-Sayad expressed reservations on the potential inclusion of her city in the proposed region.

In Sulu, Governor Abdusakur Tan Sr. was against the ratification of the BOL and questioned the law's constitutionality at the Supreme Court. However, some Sulu leaders voiced support for the law.

The provincial government of Lanao del Norte campaigned for a "No" vote since it opposed the inclusion of six of its municipalities in the proposed Bangsamoro Autonomous Region. Lanao del Norte Governor Imelda Quibranza Dimaporo as well as her husband Abdullah and son Mohammad Khalid, who were both members of the House of Representatives lead the provincial government's campaign. Abdullah Makapaar, the leader of the Moro Islamic Liberation Front's North Western Mindanao Command, campaigned for a "Yes" vote – promising to double the salary of teachers and the establishment of orphanage centers in the province.

=== Question ===
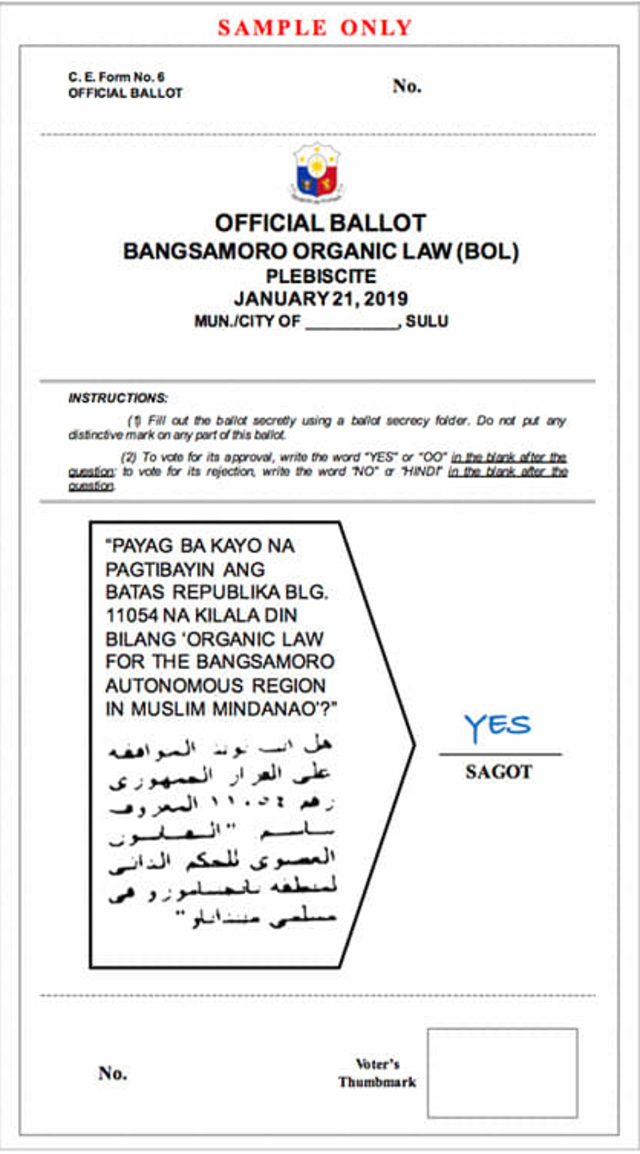
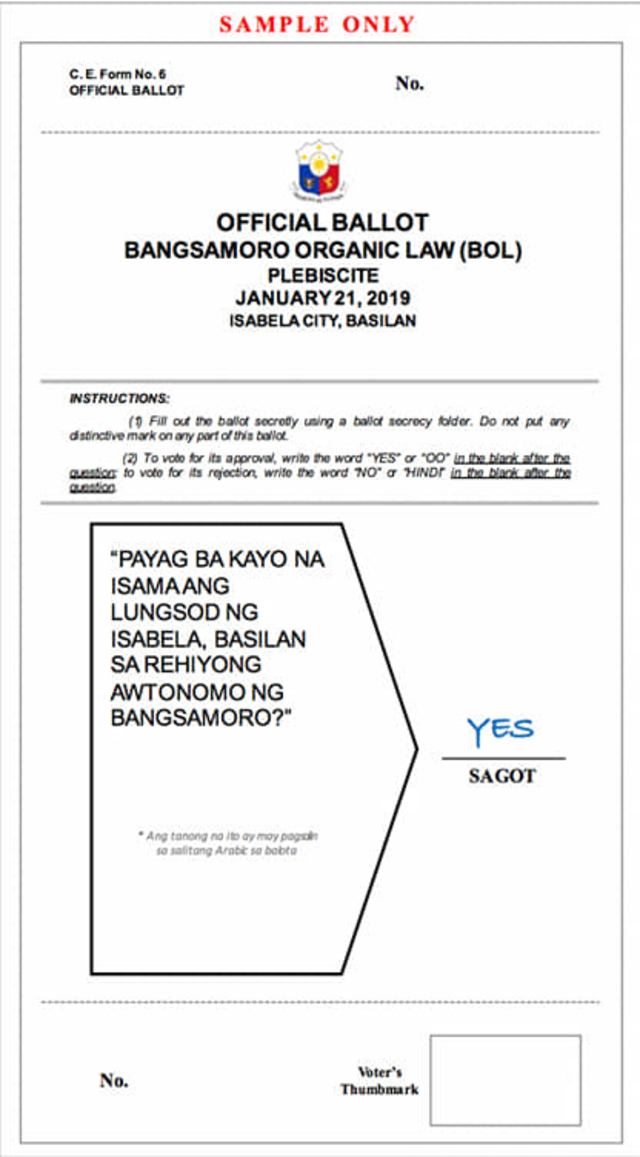
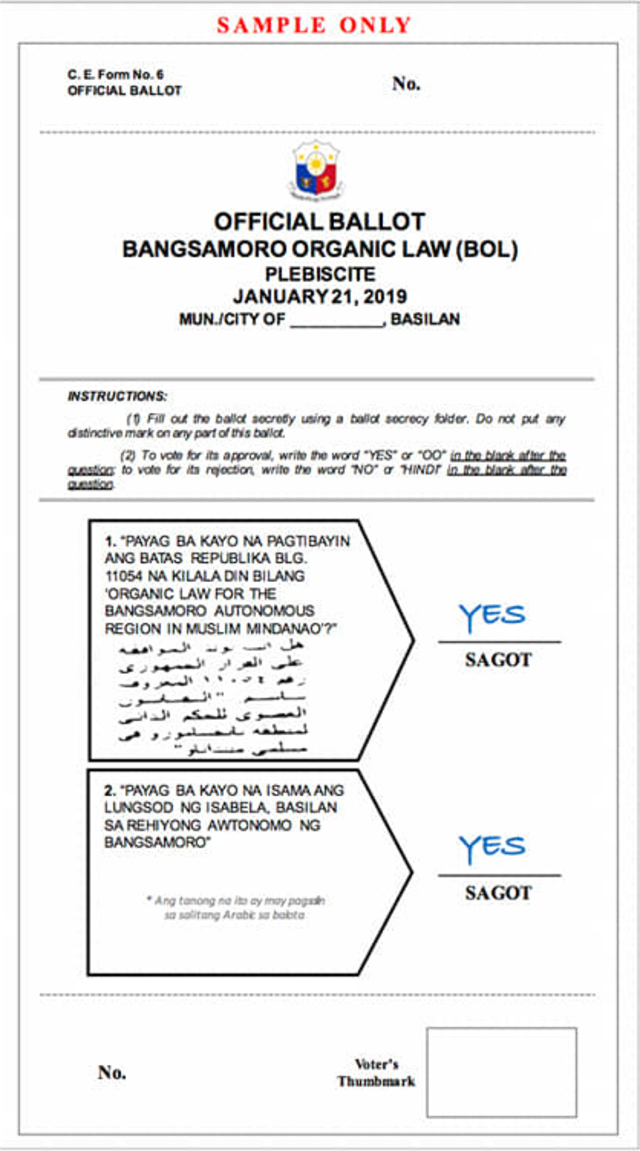
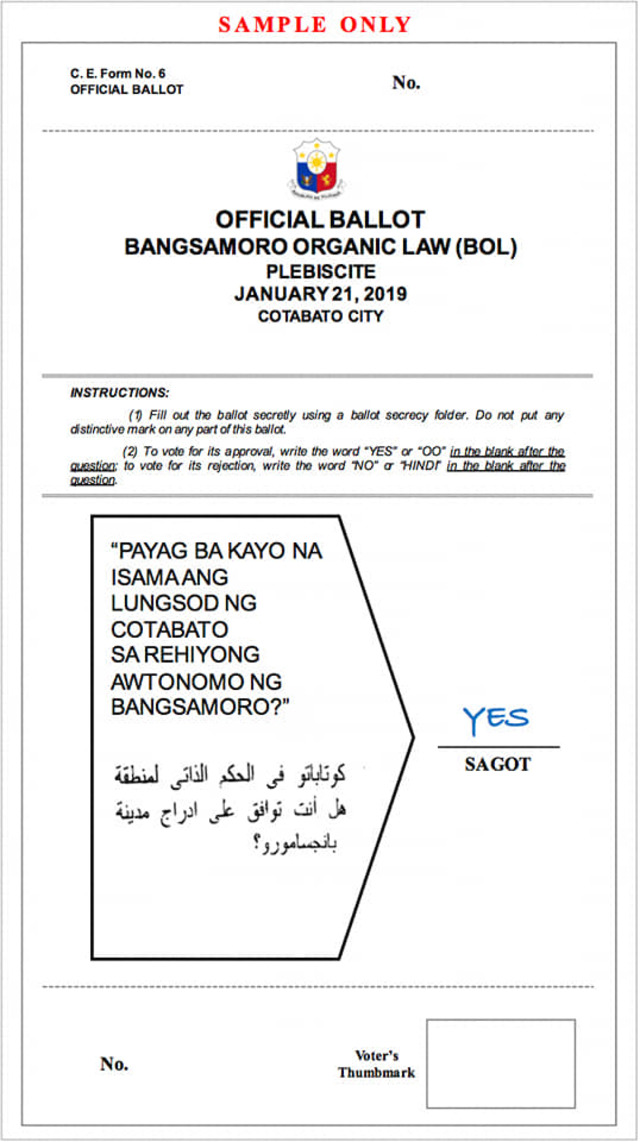
Ballot paper samples for the plebiscite from left to right: For voters in the ARMM except Basilan, Isabela City in Basilan, the rest of Basilan, and Cotabato City

The crafting of the questions to be use in the plebiscite by the Comelec was already being finalized by mid-September 2018.

In October 2018, it was reported that in the defined core territories of the proposed Bangsamoro Autonomous Region, voters will be asked to answer "Yes" or "No" if they approve the Bangsamoro Organic Law or not while in surrounding areas and non-core areas, voters will be presented a "two-folded" question.

The plebiscite questions were in Arabic and Filipino; both languages were used in the existing Autonomous Region in Muslim Mindanao areas while only Filipino was used in the rest of the plebiscite's scope. No ballots with English questions were printed.

Voters in the existing ARMM had to answer one question:

In Filipino:

"Payag ba kayo na pagtibayin ang Batas Republika Blg. 11054 na kilala din bilang "Organic Law for the Bangsamoro Autonomous Region in Muslim Mindanao"?

In Arabic:

ه‍ل أنت توُد الموافقة على القرار الجمه‍ورى رقم ١١٠٥٤ المعروف باسم: "القانون العضوى للحكم الذاتى امنطقة بانجسامورو فى مسلمى مينداناو".

English translation:

Are you willing to adopt the Republic Act No. 11054 also known as "Organic Law for the Bangsamoro Autonomous Region in Muslim Mindanao"?

Voters in Basilan were asked whether they wanted to include the city of Isabela in the proposed Bangsamoro Autonomous Region in addition to the question above regarding their stance on the ratification of the BOL. The question was presented as follows:

In Filipino:

"Payag ba kayo na isama ang Lungsod Isabela, Basilan sa Rehiyong Awtonomo ng Bangsamoro?"

In Arabic:

هل انت توافق على ادراج مدينة ايسابيلا، باسيلان فى الحكم الداتى لمنطقة بانجسامورو؟

English Translation:

"Are you willing to include the city of Isabela, Basilan in the Bangsamoro Autonomous Region?"

Voters in the cities of Isabela and Cotabato were asked one question: whether or not they were in favor of their locality's inclusion in the proposed Bangsamoro Autonomous Region.

=== Organization ===
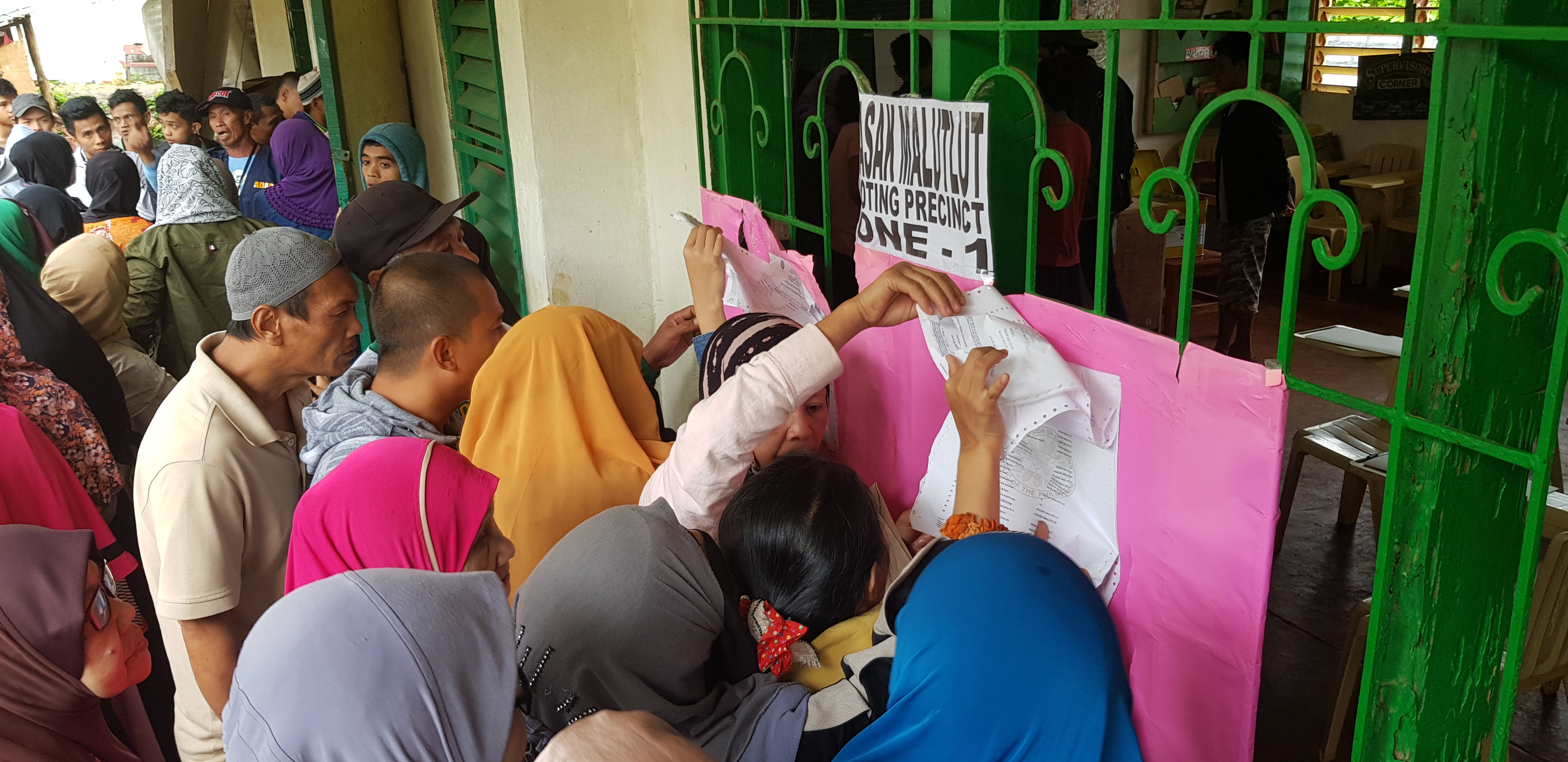
Voters look for their names inside Basak Malutlut Elementary School in Marawi during the January 21 plebiscite.

The Comelec held a simulation of the plebiscite on October 23, 2018 at its main office in Intramuros, Manila. Ballot printing started on December 7, 2018 and lasted for three days. Around 2.8 million ballots were printed.

The plebiscite was originally planned to be held at a single date on January 21, 2019. However the Comelec announced on December 7, 2018 that the plebiscite would be held in two separate days instead; on January 21 and February 6, 2019. The election body reasoned that the move was to allow the resolution of pending petitions for voluntary inclusion of additional local government units in the plebiscite.

Voters in the Autonomous Region in Muslim Mindanao including Cotabato City and Isabela City in Basilan would take part in the January 21 vote while the rest of the named participating localities in the BOL as well as additional localities which successfully petitioned for their inclusion would take part in the February 6 vote.

For both dates, the Comelec had allotted eight hours of voting. Voting was set to start at 8:00 a.m. (UTC+8) and close at 3:00 p.m. Voters within 30 metres (98 ft) of the polling area would still be allowed to vote past 3:00 p.m. Voting was to be done manually with the ballot containing questions answerable by "yes" or "no" in English or its equivalent in Filipino or any other indigenous Philippine languages. Answers made with any other mark such as a check, a cross, or a thumb mark were not accepted as valid.

At least 25 international observers were permitted to oversee the plebiscite in order to establish credibility of the plebiscite. A few restrictions and regulations were to be imposed such as the requirement for the observer to identify themselves to election authorities at the site and for them to provide copies of their report to the government. They would not be allowed to interfere in the process of the plebiscite itself. Their reports would also be used by the Comelec as a reference to improve the process of future elections and plebiscites.

=== Budget ===
It was estimated that the plebiscite would require ₱857 million pesos. By mid-September 2018, the proposed national budget for 2019 still did not include the budget for the January 2019 plebiscite.

In an event that the Congress failed to appropriate part of the 2019 national budget for the holding of the plebiscite, it was proposed that funds acquired by Comelec in the 2018 barangay elections be used to partially satisfy the financial needs of the plebiscite.

By November 2018, budget for the plebiscite had been allocated. The Department of Budget and Management stated that the funds would be drawn from the fund allocation of the Comelec.

== Legal challenges ==
Governor Abdusakur Tan II, the provincial governor of Sulu questioned the constitutionality of the Bangsamoro Organic Law before the Supreme Court of the Philippines through a petition filed in October 2018. He asked the high court to rule the BOL unconstitutional and for the stoppage of the planned plebiscite. According to the petition, the BOL which sought to replace the Autonomous Region in Muslim Mindanao with the Bangsamoro Autonomous Region was illegal, citing a view that the constitution provided for only one organic act for the establishment of an autonomous region in Muslim Mindanao. It also argued that only a constitutional amendment could legally abolish the ARMM and not legislation by the congress. In addition, it questioned the provision that the ARMM would be considered as "one geographical area" for the purpose of the plebiscite as well as the Moro Islamic Liberation Front's lead role in the Bangsamoro Transition Commission to the prejudice of other Muslims who are affiliated with other rebel groups and non-Muslims.

The Philippine Constitutional Association (Philconsa) also filed a similar petition against the BOL while an intervention was filed by the Philippine Association of Islamic Accountants (PAIA) seeking for the dismissal of the two petitions filed by the Philconsa and the Sulu provincial government. The two petitions were ordered to be consolidated by the Supreme Court on January 8, 2019. Associate Justice Mario Victor Leonen would handle the cases.

== Opinion polling ==
The International Alert (IA) conducted a survey in the Autonomous Region in Muslim Mindanao with 614 respondents aged 18–35 regarding their position on the Bangsamoro Autonomous Region creation plebiscite. Of the respondents, 89.4 percent reported that they would vote in favor of the ratification of the Bangsamoro Organic Law, while 2.5 percent said that they would vote against; the rest were unsure. However, in the same survey, respondents in the Sulu archipelago were largely undecided compared to their counterparts in mainland Mindanao.

== Results ==
Map showing the results of the January 21, 2019 plebiscite.

=== Ratification of the BOL ===
On January 25, the Commission on Elections, as the National Plebiscite Board of Canvassers, declared the ratification of the Bangsamoro Organic Law creating the Bangsamoro Autonomous Region in Muslim Mindanao (BARMM), after a majority of votes from the present Autonomous Region in Muslim Mindanao (ARMM) approved its creation.

2019 Bangsamoro autonomy plebiscite
Choice	Votes	%
For	1,540,017	88.57
Against	198,750	11.43
Total	1,738,767	100.00
Registered voters/turnout	1,980,441	87.80
Source: COMELEC

Bangsamoro autonomy plebiscite results (excluding invalid votes)
For; 1,540,017 (88.6%)
▲50%

Summary of results – On ratification of the BOL
Province	For		Against		Turnout		Registered voters	Ratified?
Province	Total	%	Total	%	Total	%	Registered voters	Ratified?
Basilan (excluding Isabela)	147,598	95.79%	6,486	4.21%	154,084	80.73%	190,861	Yes
Lanao del Sur	503,420	98.10%	9,735	1.90%	513,155	92.54%	554,552	Yes
Maguindanao	599,581	98.51%	9,096	1.49%	608,677	93.61%	650,244	Yes
Sulu	137,630	45.70%	163,526	54.30%	301,156	80.29%	375,087	No
Tawi-Tawi	151,788	93.87%	9,907	6.13%	161,695	77.11%	209,697	Yes
Total	1,540,017	88.57%	198,750	11.43%	1,738,767	87.80%	1,980,441	Yes

On the ratification of the BARMM from the then components of the ARMM, the entire ARMM voted as one; therefore, Sulu's rejection of the BARMM originally did not remove them from the BARMM, and they were thus included. The Supreme Court then nullified Sulu's inclusion in the Bangsamoro in a 2024 decision.

=== Inclusion to the Bangsamoro Autonomous Region ===
==== Cotabato City and Isabela, Basilan ====
Residents of Cotabato City and Isabela City, the latter of which is part of Basilan province but not the ARMM, voted on January 21 regarding their inclusion in the proposed Bangsamoro Autonomous Region. Isabela being a part of Basilan province, the residents of the other towns of Basilan had to consent if they were in favor of Isabela's potential inclusion in the Bangsamoro Autonomous Region. Cotabato City, as an independent component city, only needed a majority of its voters to vote in favor or against.

On January 25, the Commission on Elections, as the National Plebiscite Board of Canvassers, announced that a majority of voters in Cotabato City voted in favor of inclusion in the BARMM. In Isabela City, a majority of voters rejected their city's inclusion in the proposed BARMM while a majority of voters in the rest of the province agreed to the potential inclusion. Lacking a double majority, Isabela remains a part of the Zamboanga Peninsula region.

Summary of results – On joining the Bangsamoro Autonomous Region
City	City results							Consent from mother province							Ratified?
City	Yes		No		Turnout		Registered voters	Yes		No		Turnout		Registered voters	Ratified?
City	Total	%	Total	%	Total	%	Registered voters	Total	%	Total	%	Total	%	Registered voters	Ratified?
Isabela City (Basilan)	19,032	45.89%	22,441	54.11%	41,473	58.31%	71,124	144,640	94.46%	8,487	5.54%	153,127	80.23%	190,861	No
Cotabato City	36,682	59.48%	24,994	40.52%	58,806 (Note: Initial tabulation showed that there were 39,027 votes cast, clearly less than the sum of the votes for and against, which was 61,676. The COMELEC ordered for a retabulation of the vote. The COMELEC blamed clerical error for the discrepancy. The COMELEC confirmed the inclusion of Cotabato City in Bangsamoro. The Supreme Court in 2023 then affirmed the city's inclusion.)	51.70%	113,751	—N/a							Yes
Total					100,279	54.24%	184,875	Total				153,127	80.23%	190,861	—N/a

==== Municipalities in Lanao del Norte ====
A majority of voters in the six Lanao del Norte towns voted in favor of their municipality's inclusion in the Bangsamoro, and in the cases of Munai and Tangcal, overwhelmingly, to join the BARMM.

Like in the case of Isabela in Basilan, the six towns' inclusion in the proposed Bangsamoro Autonomous Region also needed consent from the rest of the towns in Lanao del Norte. Each town needed to secure consent individually. The city of Iligan, a highly urbanized city not under the jurisdiction of Lanao del Norte, did not participate in the plebiscite.

The other towns in Lanao del Norte rejected to allow the towns petitioning to be a part of the BARMM from joining. Because of this, the six towns that voted in favor of their inclusion would not join the proposed region. The Dimaporos, holders of the top elective positions in the province, were against their towns joining the Bangsamoro (although supported the creation of it) and campaigned against the measure.

Summary of results – On joining the Bangsamoro Autonomous Region
Municipality	Municipality results					Consent from mother province					Ratified?
Municipality	Yes		No		Total	Yes		No		Total	Ratified?
Municipality	Total	%	Total	%	Total	Total	%	Total	%	Total	Ratified?
Balo-i	8,533	73.74%	3,038	26.26%	11,571	73,164	32.13%	154,553	67.87%	227,717	No
Munai	10,765	99.96%	4	0.04%	10,769	71,148	31.05%	158,025	68.95%	229,173	No
Nunungan	1,802	64.22%	1,004	35.78%	2,806	79,935	33.79%	156,630	66.21%	236,565	No
Pantar	7,840	96.84%	256	3.16%	8,096	73,992	32.93%	150,705	67.07%	224,697	No
Tagoloan	2,760	66.78%	1,373	33.22%	4,133	78,849	33.49%	156,605	66.51%	235,454	No
Tangcal	6,276	100.00%	0	0.00%	6,276	75,364	32.38%	157,417	67.62%	232,781	No
Total	6 municipalities				43,651	Rest of Lanao del Norte				242,667	No

==== Barangays in Cotabato ====
Out of 67 barangays of Cotabato that were included in the plebiscite, all but one voted for inclusion, but three did not get consent from their mother municipality to join Bangsamoro. The barangay that rejected inclusion was allowed by its mother municipality to join. The four that were not included are Galidan in Tulunan, Balatican in Pikit, and Pagangan and Lower Mingading in Aleosan; these four would not be joining the BARMM.

In Pikit, only one barangay that voted in the plebiscite declined to join, which was Balatican. The 22 barangays that voted to join the BARMM included Barangay Fort Pikit, which was the site of the Municipal Hall. The municipal government declared that they would ask that the hall and adjacent plaza be annexed by neighboring Barangay Poblacion, one of the 20 barangays that are remaining in Cotabato.

The two barangays in Aleosan and a sole barangay in Tulunan voted in favor of their inclusion but majority of voters in the rest of their parent municipalities voted against the barangays' inclusion. Barangay Balatican in Pikit rejected their inclusion while the rest of Pikit consented the barangay's inclusion and would have been part of the new autonomous region if Balatican voters also voted for their inclusion. Balatican is the hometown of Nur Misuari, who prefer a federal set-up over the Bangsamoro autonomous region.

The 63 barangays became the Special Geographic Area of the Bangsamoro.

Summary of results – On joining the Bangsamoro Autonomous Region
Barangay	Barangay results					Consent from mother municipality					Ratified?
Barangay	Yes		No		Total	Yes		No		Total	Ratified?
Barangay	Total	%	Total	%	Total	Total	%	Total	%	Total	Ratified?
Dunguan, Aleosan	1,198	99.83%	2	0.17%	1,200	7,222	62.03%	4,420	37.97%	11,642	Yes
Lower Mingading, Aleosan	622	100.00%	0	0.00%	622	6,061	49.66%	6,144	50.34%	12,205	No
Pagangan, Aleosan	951	83.35%	190	16.65%	1,141	5,809	49.76%	5,864	50.24%	11,673	No
Tapodoc, Aleosan	592	100.00%	0	0.00%	592	7,667	62.93%	4,516	37.07%	12,183	Yes
Kibayao, Carmen	1,806	100.00%	0	0.00%	1,806	21,902	95.59%	1,011	4.41%	22,913	Yes
Kitulaan, Carmen	1,230	100.00%	0	0.00%	1,230	22,200	95.10%	1,144	4.90%	23,344	Yes
Langogan, Carmen	603	100.00%	0	0.00%	603	23,026	95.73%	1,027	4.27%	24,053	Yes
Manarapan, Carmen	1,070	100.00%	0	0.00%	1,070	23,325	95.43%	1,118	4.57%	24,443	Yes
Nasapian, Carmen	1,141	100.00%	0	0.00%	1,141	22,429	95.64%	1,022	4.36%	23,451	Yes
Pebpoloan, Carmen	394	100.00%	0	0.00%	394	22,951	95.27%	1,139	4.73%	24,090	Yes
Tupig, Carmen	761	100.00%	0	0.00%	761	21,305	89.48%	2,504	10.52%	23,809	Yes
Buluan, Kabacan	396	100.00%	0	0.00%	396	22,666	75.84%	7,221	24.16%	29,887	Yes
Nanga-an, Kabacan	1,217	100.00%	0	0.00%	1,217	21,751	74.85%	7,310	25.15%	29,061	Yes
Pedtad, Kabacan	630	63.89%	356	36.11%	986	21,856	74.62%	7,432	25.38%	29,288	Yes
Sanggadong, Kabacan	305	86.65%	47	13.35%	352	21,778	72.91%	8,093	27.09%	29,871	Yes
Simbuhay, Kabacan	624	100.00%	0	0.00%	624	22,117	75.53%	7,167	24.47%	29,284	Yes
Simone, Kabacan	1,276	100.00%	0	0.00%	1,276	21,724	75.07%	7,213	24.93%	28,937	Yes
Tamped, Kabacan	541	100.00%	0	0.00%	541	22,193	74.79%	7,480	25.21%	29,673	Yes
Damatulan, Midsayap	1,225	100.00%	0	0.00%	1,225	24,592	56.55%	18,895	43.45%	43,487	Yes
Kadigasan, Midsayap	1,118	100.00%	0	0.00%	1,118	24,651	58.09%	17,787	41.91%	42,438	Yes
Kadingilan, Midsayap	769	99.87%	1	0.13%	770	24,911	58.11%	17,956	41.89%	42,867	Yes
Kapinpilan, Midsayap	1,008	99.12%	9	0.88%	1,017	24,179	56.72%	18,450	43.28%	42,629	Yes
Kudarangan, Midsayap	414	100.00%	0	0.00%	414	25,368	58.74%	17,818	41.26%	43,186	Yes
Central Labas, Midsayap	465	100.00%	0	0.00%	465	29,721	69.81%	12,852	30.19%	42,573	Yes
Malingao, Midsayap	978	99.69%	3	0.31%	981	23,610	55.31%	19,075	44.69%	42,685	Yes
Mudseng, Midsayap	834	100.00%	0	0.00%	834	24,491	57.12%	18,382	42.88%	42,873	Yes
Nabalawag, Midsayap	1,260	99.92%	1	0.08%	1,261	24,171	56.98%	18,252	43.02%	42,423	Yes
Olandang, Midsayap	1,553	99.87%	2	0.13%	1,555	23,977	56.93%	18,142	43.07%	42,119	Yes
Sambulawan, Midsayap	408	60.80%	263	39.20%	671	25,284	58.74%	17,762	41.26%	43,046	Yes
Tugal, Midsayap	1,147	99.57%	5	0.43%	1,152	23,949	56.34%	18,560	43.66%	42,509	Yes
Tumbras, Midsayap	590	74.68%	200	25.32%	790	21,165	54.96%	17,346	45.04%	38,511	Yes
Lower Baguer, Pigkawayan	557	100.00%	0	0.00%	557	10,289	52.72%	9,227	47.28%	19,516	Yes
Balacayon, Pigkawayan	528	100.00%	0	0.00%	528	10,757	55.24%	8,716	44.76%	19,473	Yes
Buricain, Pigkawayan	634	100.00%	0	0.00%	634	11,005	56.83%	8,361	43.17%	19,366	Yes
Datu Binsaing, Pigkawayan	449	100.00%	0	0.00%	449	11,276	57.68%	8,272	42.32%	19,548	Yes
Datu Mantil, Pigkawayan	258	100.00%	0	0.00%	258	11,580	58.73%	8,138	41.27%	19,718	Yes
Kadingilan, Pigkawayan	470	100.00%	0	0.00%	470	11,212	57.60%	8,254	42.40%	19,466	Yes
Libungan Torreta, Pigkawayan	487	100.00%	0	0.00%	487	10,984	56.31%	8,523	43.69%	19,507	Yes
Matilac, Pigkawayan	760	100.00%	0	0.00%	760	10,810	57.08%	8,129	42.92%	18,939	Yes
Lower Pangangkalan, Pigkawayan	407	100.00%	0	0.00%	407	11,128	57.10%	8,362	42.90%	19,490	Yes
Patot, Pigkawayan	617	99.84%	1	0.16%	618	10,579	54.61%	8,794	45.39%	19,373	Yes
Simsiman, Pigkawayan	733	100.00%	0	0.00%	733	10,688	55.50%	8,569	44.50%	19,257	Yes
Upper Pangangkalan, Pigkawayan	408	100.00%	0	0.00%	408	11,191	57.23%	8,363	42.77%	19,554	Yes
Bagoinged, Pikit	1,602	100.00%	0	0.00%	1,602	44,307	95.96%	1,865	4.04%	46,172	Yes
Balatican, Pikit	129	23.08%	430	76.92%	559	44,964	96.76%	1,505	3.24%	46,469	No
S. Balong, Pikit	1,424	100.00%	0	0.00%	1,424	44,357	95.75%	1,971	4.25%	46,328	Yes
S. Balongis, Pikit	1,525	95.37%	74	4.63%	1,599	44,374	96.14%	1,781	3.86%	46,155	Yes
Barungis, Pikit	870	100.00%	0	0.00%	870	44,990	95.97%	1,891	4.03%	46,881	Yes
Batulawan, Pikit	1,977	99.95%	1	0.05%	1,978	43,788	95.55%	2,037	4.45%	45,825	Yes
Bualan, Pikit	756	100.00%	0	0.00%	756	45,079	97.78%	1,025	2.22%	46,104	Yes
Buliok, Pikit	1,200	100.00%	0	0.00%	1,200	44,707	96.16%	1,787	3.84%	46,494	Yes
Bulol, Pikit	1,554	100.00%	0	0.00%	1,554	44,226	96.07%	1,811	3.93%	46,037	Yes
Fort Pikit, Pikit	1,369	90.66%	141	9.34%	1,510	43,773	94.66%	2,471	5.34%	46,244	Yes
Gli-Gli, Pikit	1,156	100.00%	0	0.00%	1,156	44,077	94.68%	2,477	5.32%	46,554	Yes
Gokotan, Pikit	1,704	100.00%	0	0.00%	1,704	44,114	95.93%	1,870	4.07%	45,984	Yes
Kabasalan, Pikit	1,479	100.00%	0	0.00%	1,479	44,383	96.08%	1,812	3.92%	46,195	Yes
Lagunde, Pikit	1,573	100.00%	0	0.00%	1,573	44,159	95.91%	1,882	4.09%	46,041	Yes
Macabual, Pikit	1,165	100.00%	0	0.00%	1,165	44,690	95.91%	1,904	4.09%	46,594	Yes
Macasendeg, Pikit	978	100.00%	0	0.00%	978	44,887	95.98%	1,882	4.02%	46,769	Yes
Manaulanan, Pikit	1,712	100.00%	0	0.00%	1,712	44,118	95.87%	1,902	4.13%	46,020	Yes
Nabundas, Pikit	1,707	100.00%	0	0.00%	1,707	44,136	95.92%	1,876	4.08%	46,012	Yes
Nalapaan, Pikit	970	95.57%	45	4.43%	1,015	44,442	95.04%	2,320	4.96%	46,762	Yes
Nunguan, Pikit	1,727	100.00%	0	0.00%	1,727	43,921	95.79%	1,928	4.21%	45,849	Yes
Pamalian, Pikit	1,084	100.00%	0	0.00%	1,084	44,777	95.94%	1,895	4.06%	46,672	Yes
Panicupan, Pikit	514	87.56%	73	12.44%	587	44,711	94.97%	2,369	5.03%	47,080	Yes
Rajamuda, Pikit	1,582	100.00%	0	0.00%	1,582	44,234	96.08%	1,804	3.92%	46,038	Yes
Galidan, Tulunan	744	100.00%	0	0.00%	744	2,435	18.32%	10,858	81.68%	13,293	No
Total	67 barangays					65,779	Rest of Cotabato			189,121	Yes

== Reactions to the results ==
=== To the January 21 vote ===
Discrepancies were noted regarding the actual number of votes cast in Cotabato City: a total of 39,027 votes were recorded but 6,682 "yes" votes were recorded and 24,994 "no" votes with the combined total of the yes and no votes at 61,676. The National Plebiscite Board of Canvassers ordered a re-tabulation of the votes from Cotabato City to validate the votes.

The mayor of Cotabato City, Guiani Sayaidi, was to file a protest because of the results. She alleged harassment of voters who were not supportive of the BOL and "flying voters" or non-residents voting in another precinct. Sayaidi later alleged a conspiracy between the national government and the MILF for the result of the plebiscite in her city. She said that the military did not respond to her pleas to disperse MILF members which she claimed were harassing voters and also mentioned an alleged detention of a barangay chief at the headquarters of the Philippine Army's 6th Infantry Division after being told to attend a seminar in relation to the plebiscite on the eve of the plebiscite voting date. The claim has been denied by the Armed Forces of the Philippines, and Sayaidi was told to bring the matter to a "proper forum".

Less than a week after the plebiscite, the Our Lady of Mount Carmel Cathedral in Jolo of Sulu Province was bombed on January 27, one inside the church and another outside after the first bombing when the armed forced responded. Around 18 people were killed, while 82 others were injured. The Armed Forces of the Philippines blamed the Ajang-Ajang group of the Abu Sayyaf as the perpetrators. Sulu narrowly rejected inclusion in the BARMM, but since the old ARMM voted for inclusion, Sulu could not opt out of inclusion. The military stated that it had received reports that the Abu Sayyaf, with foreign collaboration, had been planning to attack an urban area for a "long time" and insisted that it had yet to establish a connection between the bombings and the plebiscite itself.

The United Nations and the European Union acknowledged the Bangsamoro Organic Law and the result of the plebiscite as a significant achievement in the Mindanao peace process. The government of Turkey issued a statement with the same message, while Japan has pledged continued support for aiding developments in Mindanao in accordance with the peace process.

=== To the February 6 vote ===
Following unofficial results, that the majority of voters in Lanao del Norte voted against the inclusion of six municipalities of the province in the Bangsamoro Autonomous Region, the Philippine National Police decided to keep officers stationed in various parts of the province for election duties for the plebiscite to remain in anticipation of adverse reaction to the defeat of the "Yes" votes.

== Aftermath ==
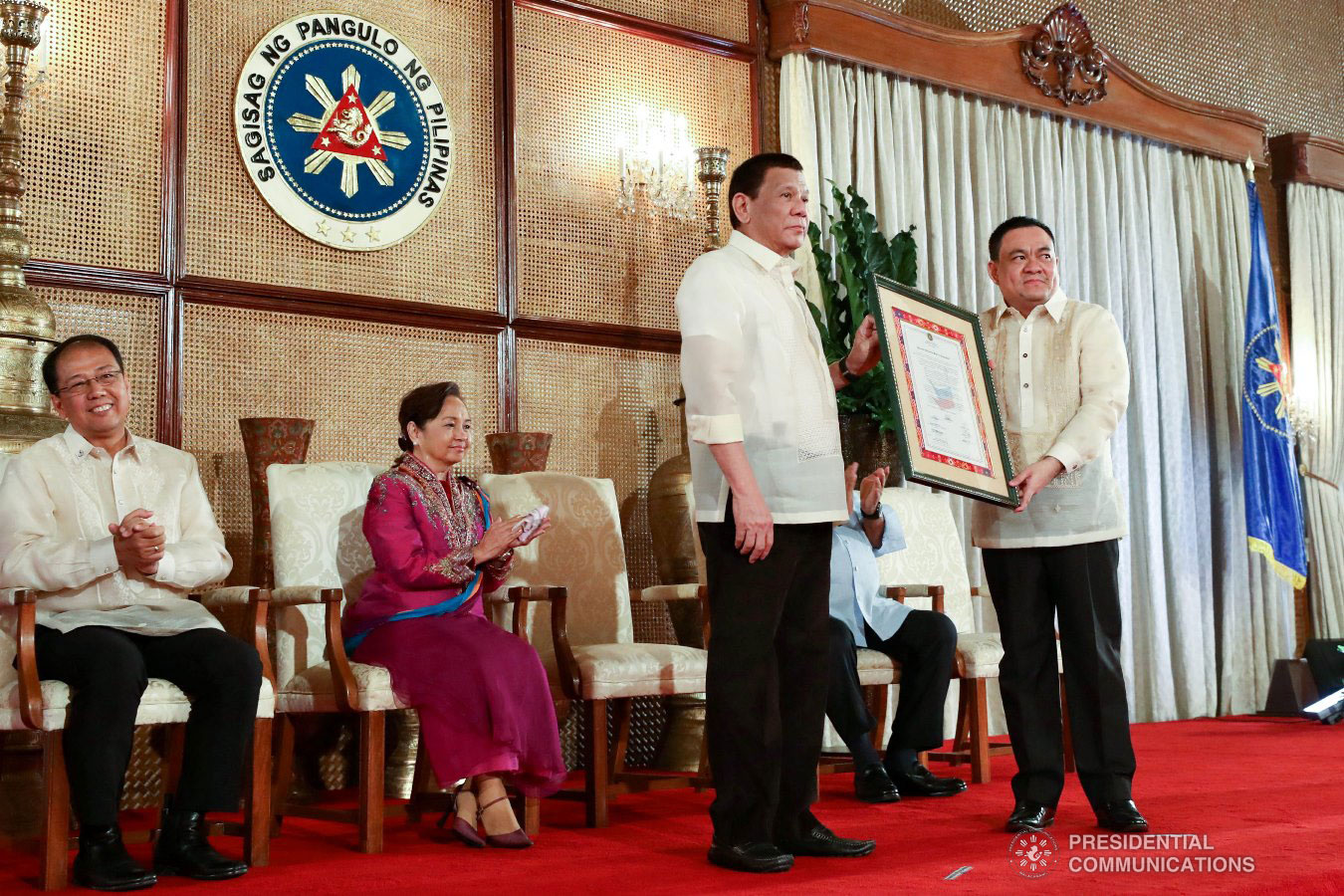
President Rodrigo Duterte being presented the results of the plebiscite by Comelec chairman Sheriff Abas in a ceremony.

The Commission on Elections announced on January 25, 2019 that the BOL was "deemed ratified", which meant that the ARMM would be abolished and that the process of the formal establishment of the Bangsamoro Autonomous Region would begin. The election body also announced that Cotabato City would be part of this new autonomous region while Isabela City in Basilan, which was never part of the ARMM, would remain outside of the new autonomous region. The election body also confirmed on February 14, 2019, that all six Lanao del Norte municipalities which could then-potentially be part of the new region voted in favor of their inclusion but failed to gain approval from voters in other towns in the province. Sixty-three out of 67 barangays were also announced to form part of the proposed autonomous region after they verified that voters in this barangays voted in favor of their inclusion while the rest of the voters from their respective parent municipalities consented their inclusion.

The barangays that would be part of the BARMM did not immediately secede from their parent municipalities and province once the Bangsamoro Autonomous Region was effectively established. They were expected to vote for municipal officials of their parent municipalities and Cotabato provincial officials in the 2019 Philippine general election in May if the barangays were not reorganized into a new municipality or merged with any of the neighboring municipalities of Maguindanao in time before the elections.

The members of an interim regional government of the Bangsamoro Autonomous Region, the Bangsamoro Transition Authority took their oaths on February 20, 2019 along with the ceremonial confirmation of the plebiscite results of both the January 21, and February 6, 2019 votes. The official turnover from the ARMM to the Bangsamoro Autonomous Region took place on February 25, 2019, thereby abolishing the Autonomous Region in Muslim Mindanao after 30 years of existence.

=== Exclusion of the Province of Sulu ===
On September 9, 2024, the Supreme Court announced that, via unanimous vote, it has mostly upheld the constitutionality of the Bangsamoro Organic Law. However, it declared unconstitutional the provision in the law whereby the provinces of the former Autonomous Region in Muslim Mindanao would considered as one unit for the purpose of determining ratification by simple majority. Thus, it ordered the exclusion of Sulu province, where 45.70% of the votes were cast in favor of ratification, from the Bangsamoro Autonomous Region in Muslim Mindanao. The decision, penned by Associate Justice Marvic Leonen, held that the inclusion of Sulu province was in violation of Article X, Section 18 of the 1987 Constitution, which states that "only provinces, cities, and geographic areas voting favorably in such plebiscite shall be included in the autonomous region."

== See also ==
- 1977 Southern Philippines autonomy plebiscite, plebiscite that created two autonomous regions in Mindanao
- 1989 Autonomous Region in Muslim Mindanao creation plebiscite, plebiscite that created the ARMM
- 2001 Autonomous Region in Muslim Mindanao expansion and inclusion plebiscite, plebiscite that expanded the ARMM
