= Referendums in the Philippines =

Referendums in the Philippines are occasionally held at the national, regional, or local level. A referendum may be either national or local in scope. In the Philippines, the terms "referendum" and "plebiscite" have distinct meanings.

== Terminology ==
According to the Initiative and Referendum Act, a referendum is "the power of the electorate to approve or reject a legislation through an election called for the purpose." A plebiscite, on the other hand, is "the electoral process by which an initiative on the Constitution is approved or rejected by the people."

=== Referendums ===
The constitution mandates a referendum for these instances:

- Adoption of a new name for the country, or a new national anthem or a new seal
- Allowing foreign military troops in the Philippines if Congress requires

The Initiative and Referendum Act allows for referendums on these cases:

- A petition of at least 10% of registered voters, with 3% within every legislative district for local initiatives
  - If there is only one legislative district in a province, city or municipality, it has to be 3% within each municipality in a province, or each barangay in a city
  - For barangay initiatives, it has to be at least 10% of registered voters
- A local legislative body can also submit to the electorate approval of any ordinance or resolution

=== Plebiscites ===
The constitution requires a plebiscite for these:

- Creation, division, merger, abolishment or major boundary changes of a province, city, municipality or barangay (village).
- Creation of special metropolitan political subdivisions
- Creation of autonomous regions
- Approval of an amendment or revision to the constitution

The Initiative and Referendum Act allows for plebiscites on these cases:

- A petition of at least 12% of registered voters, with 3% within every legislative district, for amending the constitution

However, the Supreme Court declared the Initiative and Referendum Act procedures for amending the constitution as fatally defective, although it did not affect the operation of the law for other types of initiatives.

=== Other ===
The constitution allows Congress to submit to the electorate the question of calling a constitutional convention; however, it did not specify what kind of balloting this is.

== Administration ==
As with other electoral exercises, referendums and plebiscites in the Philippines are administered by the Commission on Elections (COMELEC). The commission's authority to conduct such exercises is mandated by the 1987 Constitution and further detailed in the Omnibus Election Code. COMELEC is responsible for preparing the ballots, supervising the voting process, and canvassing and proclaiming the results.

== National referendums ==
=== Spanish colonial period ===
In 1599, King Philip II of Spain ordered a referendum in several areas to confirm Spanish sovereignty in the islands. It was approved.

=== American colonial period ===
In 1935, the first national plebiscite was held, for the ratification of the 1935 constitution. This was seen as an independence referendum, and those in favor of adoption the constitution overwhelmingly outnumbered those who were opposed.

Two years later, a plebiscite asked women if they wanted suffrage for themselves. Unlike other referendums, 300,000 votes to the affirmative were needed; Filipino women turned out in droves, with more than 447,000 voting for suffrage.

Two years later, a plebiscite asked the people about economic adjustments. These were amendments to the Tydings–McDuffie Act. The people overwhelmingly approved the amendments.

In 1940, a plebiscite asked three questions to the people. These were amendments to the constitution that restored the bicameral Congress, allowed the re-election of the president, and created the Commission on Elections. The people approved all three, but not as overwhelmingly as the 1935 and 1939 plebiscites.

=== Third Republic ===
The Americans granted independence to the Philippines on July 4, 1946. Prior to that, Congress passed Commonwealth Act No. 733, the local version of the Bell Trade Act passed by the United States Congress, which include parity rights for both Filipino and American citizens to exploit Philippine natural resources. As this meant amending the constitution, a plebiscite was called after it was passed by the Philippine Congress by much difficulty. Turnout was low, but the measure was approved by the people by a 5:1 margin.

By 1967, there were moves to revise the constitution. Congress passed amendments to the constitution where it increased the number of congressmen, and allowed incumbent members of Congress to sit in the incoming constitutional convention. In a plebiscite held together with the 1967 Senate election, the people overwhelmingly rejected both questions. This was the only time the government lost. A constitutional convention was elected in 1970, and new constitution was put to a plebiscite in 1973.

=== Martial law and Fourth Republic ===
President Ferdinand Marcos declared martial law on September 23, 1972. Martial law prevented Congress to convene. The constitutional convention presented to him the draft constitution by December 1972. Meanwhile, some senators have been organizing to convene on the supposed resumption of Congress by January 22, 1973. Marcos then created barangay or citizens' assemblies. These assemblies, instead of via secret ballot, voted via showing of hands on the new constitution, and whether to hold another plebiscite for approving the constitution, from January 10 to 15, 1973. The citizens' assemblies overwhelmingly approved the constitution, and voted not to hold another plebiscite.

Marcos had several more referendums, all being voted by citizens' assemblies, and won on overwhelming margins.

=== Fifth Republic ===
Marcos was overthrown after the People Power Revolution, where he was alleged to have cheated during the 1986 presidential election. Corazon Aquino, Marcos's opponent, became president, and did away with the 1973 constitution. She appointed a constitutional commission that drafted a new constitution. This was then approved by the people in a plebiscite in a margin of more than 3:1.

== Local plebiscites ==
Local plebiscites have mostly been for the creation, inclusion to, or division of new autonomous regions, provinces, cities, municipalities, and barangays.

This is a list of local plebiscites, from the regional down to the municipal level. A law, proclamation, resolution, or ordinance has to be passed for a plebiscite to take place.

Acronym	Meaning	Implementing agency
BA	Bangsamoro Act	Bangsamoro Parliament
BP	Batas Pambansa (National Law)	Batasang Pambansa (National Legislature)
City Ord	City Ordinance	Sangguniang Panlungsod (City Council)
MMAA	Muslim Mindanao Autonomy Act	ARMM Regional Legislative Assembly
PD	Presidential Decree	President of the Philippines
PP	Presidential Proclamation	President of the Philippines
RA	Republic Act	Congress of the Philippines
Prov Res	Sangguniang Panlalawigan Resolution	Sangguniang Panlalawigan (Provincial Board)

=== Regional-level plebiscites ===
These plebiscites asked for the creation of, or the inclusion of a place, in an autonomous region.

The 1987 constitution states that there are two autonomous regions: Muslim Mindanao and the Cordillera. Five successful plebiscites in Mindanao have led to the creation of the present-day Bangsamoro via a 2019 plebiscite. In the Cordillera, two plebiscites have failed, the latest in 1998, and it is still treated as a regular administrative region.

Date	Location	Proposition	Enabling law	Result
April 17, 1977	Central Mindanao, Davao del Sur, Palawan, South Cotabato and Western Mindanao	Creation of autonomous regions in Mindanao	PD 1092; PD 1098; PD 1111	Ratified for two regions
May 17, 1982	Central Mindanao and Western Mindanao	Merger of Lupong Tagapagpaganap of Regions IX and XII as one executive body	PD 1843	Rejected
November 19, 1989	Central Mindanao, Davao del Sur, Palawan, South Cotabato and Western Mindanao	Creation of the Autonomous Region in Muslim Mindanao	RA 6734	Ratified in Lanao del Sur, Maguindanao, Sulu, and Tawi-Tawi, rejected elsewhere
January 30, 1990	Cordillera Administrative Region	Creation of the Cordillera Autonomous Region	RA 6766	Ratified in Ifugao, rejected elsewhere; ratification nullified by the Supreme Court. (Note: The Supreme Court ruled that autonomous regions should consist of more than one province.)
March 8, 1998	Cordillera Administrative Region	Creation of the Cordillera Autonomous Region	RA 8438	Rejected
August 14, 2001	Autonomous Region in Muslim Mindanao	Increased autonomy, expansion of the Autonomous Region in Muslim Mindanao	RA 9054	Ratified in every province
August 14, 2001	Central Mindanao, Palawan, Southern Mindanao, Western Mindanao	Inclusion to the Autonomous Region in Muslim Mindanao	RA 9054	Ratified in Basilan and Marawi, rejected elsewhere
January 21 and February 6, 2019	Autonomous Region in Muslim Mindanao	Creation of the Bangsamoro	RA 11054	Originally ratified in the original ARMM, then nullified in Sulu by the Supreme Court.
January 21 and February 6, 2019	Basilan, Cotabato City, Lanao del Norte, 7 municipalities in Cotabato	Inclusion to the Bangsamoro	RA 11054	Ratified in Cotabato City and 63 barangays in Cotabato, rejected elsewhere

=== Provincial-level plebiscites ===
These plebiscites asked for the creation of a province or involved an entire province. A group of cities and municipalities (most usually a legislative district or, formerly, sub-provinces) that aim to become provinces have provincehood (in the case of legislative districts) or conversion (in the case of sub-provinces) plebiscites. There had also been plebiscites asking for the transfer of the provincial capital from one municipality to another, the selection of a provincial capital, and the renaming of a province. There was also a plebiscite asking a province if they would approve the conversion of a component city within that province to a highly urbanized city. A "highly urbanized city" is politically, administratively, and fiscally independent from a province.

Date	Location	Proposition	Enabling law	Result
November 12, 1965	Samar	Division of Samar to create the provinces of Eastern Samar, Northern Samar and Western Samar (renamed in 1969 as "Samar")	RA 4221	Ratified
November 14, 1967	Agusan	Division of Agusan to create the provinces of Agusan del Norte and Agusan del Sur	RA 4979	Ratified
November 11, 1969	Nueva Vizcaya	Creation of the sub-province of Quirino	RA 5554	Ratified
November 9, 1971	Quirino	Conversion of Quirino to a province	RA 6394	Ratified
November 9, 1971	Siquijor	Conversion of Siquijor to a province	RA 6398	Ratified
November 9, 1971	Siquijor	Selection of provincial capital	RA 6398	Siquijor was chosen
April 17, 1977	Basilan	Confirmation on the conversion of City of Basilan to a province	PD 1111	Ratified
April 17, 1977	North Cotabato, Maguindanao, and Sultan Kudarat	Confirmation of the division of Cotabato to create the provinces of North Cotabato, Maguindanao, and Sultan Kudarat	PD 1111	Ratified
April 17, 1977	Tawi-Tawi	Confirmation of the creation of Tawi-Tawi	PD 1111	Ratified
May 20, 1979	Aurora	Conversion of Aurora to a province	BA 7	Ratified
March 5, 1982	Lanao del Norte	Transfer of the provincial capital from Iligan to Tubod	BP 181	Ratified
December 18, 1982	Maguindanao	Transfer of the provincial capital from Sultan Kudarat to Maganoy	PD 1170	Ratified
January 3, 1986	Part of Negros Occidental	Creation of Negros del Norte	BP 885	Ratified; then nullified by the Supreme Court (Note: The Supreme Court ruled that the province does not meet the requirements of the 1983 Local Government Code, and by not including the rest of Negros Occidental in the plebiscite.)
May 11, 1992	Biliran	Conversion of Biliran to a province	RA 7160	Ratified
May 11, 1992	Guimaras	Conversion of Guimaras to a province	RA 7160	Ratified
May 8, 1995	Kalinga-Apayao	Conversion of Apayao and Kalinga to separate provinces	RA 7878	Ratified
June 20, 1995	Isabela	Division of Isabela to create the provinces of Isabela del Norte and Isabela del Sur	RA 7891	Rejected
March 8, 1998	Davao del Norte	Creation of Compostela Valley	RA 8470	Ratified
February 22, 2001	Zamboanga del Sur	Creation of Zamboanga Sibugay	RA 8973	Ratified
October 28, 2006	Maguindanao	Creation of Shariff Kabunsuan	MMAA 201	Ratified; then nullified by the Supreme Court (Note: The Supreme Court ruled that the creation of legislative districts, and provinces by extension, by a body other than Congress as unconstitutional)
December 5, 2006	Surigao del Norte	Creation of Dinagat Islands	RA 9355	Ratified; (Note: Originally nullified by the Supreme Court as the province did not pass the minimum requirements for becoming a province, but the court reversed its original ruling)
March 29, 2008	Basilan	Creation of Tabuan-Lasa	MMAA 187	Ratified
December 13, 2008	Quezon	Creation of the Quezon del Sur, and renaming the rest of Quezon as "Quezon del Norte"	RA 9495	Rejected
October 28, 2013	Davao del Sur	Creation of Davao Occidental	RA 10360	Ratified
December 7, 2019	Compostela Valley	Renaming of Compostela Valley to "Davao de Oro"	RA 11297	Ratified
March 13, 2021	Palawan	Division of Palawan to create the provinces of Palawan del Norte, Palawan del Sur, and Palawan Oriental	RA 11259	Rejected
September 17, 2022	Maguindanao	Division of Maguindanao to create the provinces of Maguindanao del Norte and Maguindanao del Sur	RA 11150	Ratified
October 30, 2023	Bulacan	Conversion of San Jose del Monte to a highly urbanized city	PP 1057 s. 2020	Rejected

=== Municipal- and city-level plebiscites ===
These plebiscites involved entire municipalities or cities, asked for the incorporation of a new municipality, or asked for cityhood. Most plebiscites involving entire municipalities ask for its cityhood, conversion from being a component city to a highly urbanized city (see provincial-level plebiscites section above), creation of a new municipality from a group of barangays within it, its renaming, the creation of new barangays, transfer of one barangay from one municipality to another, or merger with other municipalities in order to become a city.

Date	Location	Proposition	Enabling law	Result
November 14, 1961	Caloocan, Rizal	Cityhood of Caloocan	RA 3278	Ratified
November 12, 1963	Angeles, Pampanga	Cityhood of Angeles	RA 3700	Ratified
November 12, 1963	Ligao, Albay	Creation of Pioduran	RA 3187	Ratified
November 9, 1965	Bago, Negros Occidental	Cityhood of Bago	RA 4382	Ratified
November 9, 1965	General Santos, Cotabato	Cityhood of General Santos, and renaming it to "Rajah Buayan"	RA 4413	Rejected (Note: The Supreme Court ruled that the votes for cityhood must be more than a majority of registered voters, not just of those who voted.)
November 9, 1965	San Carlos, Pangasinan	Cityhood of San Carlos	RA 4487	Ratified
November 9, 1965	Laoag, Ilocos Norte	Cityhood of Laoag	RA 4584	Ratified
November 9, 1965	La Carlota, Negros Occidental	Cityhood of La Carlota	RA 4585	Ratified
November 9, 1965	Batangas, Batangas	Cityhood of Batangas, and renaming it to "Laurel City"	RA 4586	Rejected
November 11, 1969	Puerto Princesa, Palawan	Cityhood of Puerto Princesa	RA 5906	Ratified
November 11, 1969	Tarlac, Tarlac	Cityhood of Tarlac	RA 5907	Rejected
November 11, 1969	Almagro, Samar	Creation of Tagapul-an	RA 5970	Failed to be held
November 8, 1971	Oroquieta, Misamis Occidental	Creation of Pines	RA 6022	Rejected
November 8, 1971	Lanuza, Surigao del Sur	Creation of Carmen	RA 6367	Ratified
November 8, 1971	Dupax, Nueva Vizcaya	Creation of Dupax del Sur, and renaming the rest of Dupax as "Dupax del Norte"	RA 6372	Ratified
November 8, 1971	Olongapo	Renaming of Olongapo to "Pres. Magsaysay"	RA 6340	Rejected
December 8, 1978	Dao, Antique	Renaming of Dao to "Tobias Fornier"	BP 10	Ratified
February 4, 1979	Gandara, Samar	Creation of San Jorge	BP 11	Ratified
February 4, 1979	Liloy, Zamboanga del Norte	Creation of Tampilisan	BP 14	Ratified
February 4, 1979	Manukan, Zamboanga del Norte	Creation of Ponot	BP 15	Ratified
April 3, 1979	Tarangnan, Samar	Creation of Pagsanghan	BP 16	Ratified
April 17, 1979	Labason, Zamboanga del Norte	Creation of Gutalac	BP 19	Ratified
May 20, 1979	Asuncion, Davao del Norte	Creation of San Vicente	BP 23	Ratified
July 10, 1979	Dupax del Norte and Dupax del Sur, Nueva Vizcaya	Creation of Alfonso Castaňeda	BP 27	Ratified
February 21, 1980	Malita, Davao del Sur	Creation of Don Marcelino	BP 47	Ratified
February 23, 1980	Malangas and Silay, Zamboanga del Sur	Creation of Diplahan	BP 48	Ratified
September 22, 1980	Bayugan, Agusan del Sur	Creation of Sibagat	BP 56	Ratified
September 22, 1980	Midsalip, Ramon Magsaysay, Mahayag, Dumingag and Tukuran, Zamboanga del Sur	Creation of Don Mariano Marcos	BP 60	Ratified
December 2, 1980	Catarman, Samar	Creation of Lope de Vega	BP 69	Ratified
December 6, 1980	Mayoyao, Ifugao	Creation of Aguinaldo	BP 86	Ratified
December 6, 1980	Matalam, North Cotabato	Creation of Antipas	BP 88	Ratified
January 10, 1981	Carmona, Cavite	Creation of General Mariano Alvarez	BP 75	Ratified
April 7, 1981	Banga and Norala, South Cotabato	Creation of Santo Niño	BP 90	Ratified
April 7, 1981	Talibon and Trinidad, Bohol	Creation of Bien Unido	BP 93	Ratified
April 7, 1981	Siocon, Zamboanga del Norte	Creation of Baliguian	BP 101	Ratified
May 17, 1982	Carmen, North Cotabato	Creation of Banisilan	BP 141	Ratified
May 17, 1982	Salug, Zamboanga del Nortre	Creation of Godod	BP 146	Ratified
May 17, 1982	Balabagan, Lanao del Norte	Creation of Kapatagan	BP 168	Ratified
May 17, 1982	Clarin, Tudela and Sinacaban, Misamis Occidental	Creation of Don Mariano Marcos	BP 171	Ratified
May 17, 1982	Margosatubig, Zamboanga del Sur	Creation of Vincenzo A. Sagun	BP 173	Ratified
May 17, 1982	Ipil, Zamboanga del Sur	Creation of Roseller Lim	BP 183	Ratified
May 17, 1982	Sindangan, Zamboanga del Norte	Creation of Bacungan	BP 204	Ratified
May 17, 1982	Pikit, North Cotabato	Creation of Aleosan	BP 206	Ratified
January 28, 1983	Hungduan and Banaue, Ifugao	Creation of Tinoc	BP 184	Ratified
January 28, 1983	Lagawe and Banaue, Ifugao	Creation of Hingyon	BP 239	Ratified
September 7, 1983	Cabadbaran, Agusan del Norte	Creation of Remedios T. Romualdez	BP 236	Ratified
September 24, 1983	Maddela, Quirino	Creation of Nagtipunan	BP 345	Ratified
October 7, 1983	San Agustin, Romblon	Creation of Imelda	BP 234	Ratified
October 8, 1983	Quezon, Palawan	Creation of Marcos	BP 386	Ratified
October 15, 1983	Siasi, Sulu	Creation of Pandami	BP 324	Ratified
October 15, 1983	Tiboli and Surallah, South Cotabato	Creation of Lake Sebu	BP 249	Ratified
March 10, 1989	Caloocan	Reorganization of barangays	RA 6714	Rejected
May 21, 1989	Padre Burgos, Southern Leyte	Creation of Limasawa	PP 392 s. 1989	Ratified
July 9, 1989	Kalamansig and Bagumbayan, Sultan Kudarat	Creation of Senator Ninoy Aquino	RA 6712	Ratified
December 31, 1989	Dinagat, Surigao del Norte	Creation of San Jose	RA 6769	Ratified
April 21, 1990	Tarlac, Tarlac	Creation of San Jose	RA 6842	Ratified
May 26, 1990	Labason, Zamboanga del Norte	Creation of Kalawit	RA 6851	Ratified
April 7, 1991	Buluan, Maguindanao	Creation of General Salipada K. Pendatun	MMAA 3	Ratified
November 24, 1991	Kapalong, Davao del Norte	Creation of Talaingod	RA 7081	Ratified
December 27, 1991	Magpet, North Cotabato	Creation of Arakan	RA 7152	Ratified
January 5, 1992	Dinas, San Miguel, Dumalinao and San Pablo, Zamboanga del Sur	Creation of Guipos	RA 7159	Ratified
January 19, 1992	Dumalinao, Zamboanga del Sur	Creation of Tigbao	RA 7162	Ratified
July 5, 1992	Kiangan, Ifugao	Creation of Asipulo	RA 7173	Ratified
September 12, 1992	Culion leper colony, Palawan	Creation of Culion	RA 7193	Ratified
April 10, 1994	Mandaluyong	Cityhood of Mandaluyong	RA 7675	Ratified
May 5, 1994	Linapacan, Palawan	Renaming of Linapacan to "Gaudencio E. Abordo"	RA 6860	Rejected
May 5, 1994	Brooke's Point, Palawan	Creation of Sofronio Española	RA 7679	Ratified
May 28, 1994	San Vicente, Davao del Norte	Renaming of San Vicente to "Laak"		Ratified
July 6, 1994	Santiago, Isabela	Cityhood of Santiago	RA 7720	Ratified
January 21, 1995	Pasig	Cityhood of Pasig	RA 7829	Ratified
February 4, 1995	Makati	Cityhood of Makati	RA 7854	Ratified
May 8, 1995	Jordan and Nueva Valencia, Guimaras	Creation of Sibunag	RA 7896	Ratified
May 8, 1995	Jordan and Buenavista, Guimaras	Creation of San Lorenzo	RA 7897	Ratified
May 8, 1995	Muntinlupa	Cityhood of Muntinlupa	RA 7926	Ratified
October 1, 1995	Bongabon and Palayan, Nueva Ecija	Transfer of Barangay Popolan from Bongabon to Palayan	RA 8030	Ratified
March 10, 1996	Espiritu, Ilocos Norte	Renaming of Espiritu to "Banna"	Prov Res 120-95	Ratified
August 10, 1996	Sagay, Negros Occidental	Cityhood of Sagay	RA 8192	Ratified
February 15, 1997	Butig, Lumbatan, and Lumbayanagui, Lanao del Sur	Creation of Sultan Dumalondong	MMAA 36	Ratified
March 26, 1997	Las Piñas	Cityhood of Las Piñas	RA 8251	Ratified
May 12, 1997	Cabanatuan, Nueva Ecija	Conversion of Cabanatuan to a highly urbanized city	PP 969. s. 1997	Rejected
August 2, 1997	Kabankalan, Negros Occidental	Cityhood of Kabankalan	RA 8297	Ratified
March 7, 1998	Babak, Samal and Kaputian, Davao del Norte	Merger of Babak, Samal and Kaputian as the city of Samal	RA 8471	Ratified
March 7, 1998	Tagum, Davao del Norte	Cityhood of Tagum	RA 8472	Ratified
March 7, 1998	Panabo and Carmen, Davao del Norte	Creation of Braulio E. Dujali	RA 8473	Ratified
March 14, 1998	Passi, Iloilo	Cityhood of Passi	RA 8469	Ratified
March 20, 1998	San Fernando, La Union	Cityhood of San Fernando	RA 8509	Ratified
March 21, 1998	Calapan, Oriental Mindoro	Cityhood of Calapan	RA 8475	Ratified
March 21, 1998	Talisay, Negros Occidental	Cityhood of Talisay	RA 8979	Ratified
March 21, 1998	Urdaneta, Pangasinan	Cityhood of Urdaneta	RA 8480	Ratified
March 21, 1998	Victorias, Negros Occidental	Cityhood of Victorias	RA 8488	Ratified
March 22, 1998	Malaybalay, Bukidnon	Cityhood of Malaybalay	RA 8490	Ratified
March 22, 1998	Kidapawan, North Cotabato	Cityhood of Kidapawan	RA 8500	Ratified
March 22, 1998	Parañaque	Cityhood of Parañaque	RA 8507	Ratified
April 4, 1998	Taguig	Cityhood of Taguig	RA 8487	Ratified (Note: Originally rejected, but a recount saw more votes for cityhood.)
April 4, 1998	Antipolo, Rizal	Cityhood of Antipolo	RA 8508	Ratified
April 18, 1998	Tarlac, Tarlac	Cityhood of Tarlac	RA 8593	Ratified
October 31, 1998	Shariff Aguak, Maguindanao	Creation of Mamasapano	MMAA 54	Ratified
December 30, 1998	Valenzuela	Cityhood of Valenzuela	RA 8526	Ratified
March 14, 1999	Ilagan, Isabela	Cityhood of Ilagan	RA 8474	Rejected
June 26, 1999	Talayan, Maguindanao	Creation of Talitay	MMAA 52	Ratified
October 23, 1999	Quezon City	Creation of Novaliches City	RA 8535	Rejected
December 18, 1999	Malolos, Bulacan	Cityhood of Malolos	RA 8754	Ratified
December 18, 1999	Tuguegarao, Cagayan	Cityhood of Tuguegarao	RA 8755	Ratified
March 18, 2000	Pagalungan, Maguindanao	Creation of Pagagawan	MMAA 95	Ratified
August 10, 2000	Maasin, Southern Leyte	Cityhood of Maasin	RA 8796	Ratified
September 8, 2000	Digos, Davao del Sur	Cityhood of Digos	RA 8798	Ratified
September 10, 2000	San Jose del Monte, Bulacan	Cityhood of San Jose del Monte	RA 8797	Ratified
September 18, 2000	Bislig, Surigao del Sur	Cityhood of Bislig	RA 8804	Ratified
September 18, 2000	Tacurong, Sultan Kudarat	Cityhood of Tacurong	RA 8805	Ratified
September 30, 2000	Masbate, Masbate	Cityhood of Masbate	RA 8807	Ratified
October 8, 2000	Koronadal, South Cotabato	Cityhood of Koronadal	RA 8803	Ratified
December 9, 2000	Muñoz, Nueva Ecija	Cityhood of Muñoz	RA 8977	Ratified
December 16, 2000	Bacon and Sorsogon, Sorsogon	Merger of Bacon and Sorsogon as the city of Sorsogon	RA 8806	Ratified
December 23, 2000	Bayawan, Negros Oriental	Cityhood of Bayawan	RA 8963	Ratified
December 30, 2000	Talisay, Cebu	Cityhood of Talisay	RA 8979	Ratified
December 30, 2000	Balanga, Bataan	Cityhood of Balanga	RA 8984	Ratified
December 30, 2000	Valencia, Bukidnon	Cityhood of Valencia	RA 8985	Ratified
January 22, 2001	Vigan, Ilocos Sur	Cityhood of Vigan	RA 8988	Ratified
February 3, 2001	San Fernando, Pampanga	Cityhood of San Fernando	RA 8990	Ratified
March 10, 2001	Tanauan, Batangas	Cityhood of Tanauan	RA 9005	Ratified
March 24, 2001	Ligao, Albay	Cityhood of Ligao	RA 9008	Ratified
March 24, 2001	Tabaco, Albay	Cityhood of Tabaco	RA 9020	Ratified
March 28, 2001	Candon, Ilocos Sur	Cityhood of Candon	RA 9018	Ratified
March 28, 2001	Alaminos, Pangasinan	Cityhood of Alaminos	RA 9025	Ratified
March 30, 2001	Cauayan, Isabela	Cityhood of Cauayan	RA 9017	Ratified
March 30, 2001	Meycauayan, Bulacan	Cityhood of Meycauayan	RA 9021	Rejected
March 31, 2001	Escalante, Negros Occidental	Cityhood of Escalante	RA 9014	Ratified
March 31, 2001	Panabo, Davao del Norte	Cityhood of Panabo	RA 9015	Ratified
March 31, 2001	Tanjay, Negros Oriental	Cityhood of Tanjay	RA 9026	Ratified
March 31, 2001	Sipalay, Negros Occidental	Cityhood of Sipalay	RA 9027	Ratified
March 31, 2001	Himamaylan, Negros Occidental	Cityhood of Himamaylan	RA 9028	Ratified
July 15, 2002	Busuanga and Culion, Palawan	Transfer of Barangays Burabod and Halsey from Busuanga to Culion	RA 9032	Ratified
July 15, 2002	Culion, Palawan	Creation of Barangay De Carabao	RA 9032	Ratified
June 6, 2004	Asuncion and Kapalong, Davao del Norte	Creation of San Isidro	RA 9265	Ratified
July 10, 2004	Santa Rosa, Laguna	Cityhood of Santa Rosa	RA 9264	Ratified
September 16, 2004	Sultan sa Barongis, Maguindanao	Creation of Rajah Buayan	MMAA 126	Ratified
November 27, 2004	Bayang and Lumbatan, Lanao del Sur	Creation of Lumbaca-Unayan	MMAA 106	Ratified
February 18, 2006	Tarlac City, Tarlac	Conversion of Tarlac City to a highly urbanized city	PP 940, s. 2005	Rejected
May 22, 2006	Tipo-Tipo, Basilan	Creation of Ungkaya Pukan	MMAA 190	Ratified
May 22, 2006	Tipo-Tipo, Basilan	Creation of Al-Barka	MMAA 191	Ratified
May 22, 2006	Tuburan, Basilan	Creation of Hadji Mohammad Ajul	MMAA 192	Ratified
May 22, 2006	Tuburan, Basilan	Creation of Akbar	MMAA 193	Ratified
September 16, 2006	Sitangkai, Tawi-Tawi	Creation of Sibutu	MMAA 197	Ratified
September 16, 2006	Upi, Maguindanao	Creation of Datu Blah T. Sinsuat	MMAA 198	Ratified
December 10, 2006	Meycauayan, Bulacan	Cityhood of Meycauayan	RA 9356	Ratified
December 30, 2006	Buluan, Maguindanao	Creation of Pandag	MMAA 203	Ratified
December 30, 2006	Kabuntalan, Shariff Kabunsuan	Creation of Northern Kabuntalan	MMAA 206	Ratified
December 30, 2006	Talayan and Talitay, Maguindanao	Creation of Datu Anggal Midtimbang	MMAA 207	Ratified
June 16, 2007	San Juan	Cityhood of San Juan	RA 9388	Ratified
June 24, 2007	Navotas	Cityhood of Navotas	RA 9387	Ratified
July 9, 2007	Puerto Princesa, Palawan	Conversion of Puerto Princesa to a highly urbanized city	PP 1264, s. 2007	Ratified
July 21, 2007	Lapu-Lapu City, Cebu	Conversion of Lapu-Lapu City to a highly urbanized city	PP 1222, s. 2007	Ratified
August 25, 2007	Luuk, Sulu	Creation of Omar	MMAA 194	Ratified
August 25, 2007	Lantawan, Basilan	Creation of Hadji Muhtamad	MMAA 200	Ratified
December 18, 2008	Tacloban, Leyte	Conversion of Tacloban to a highly urbanized city	PP 1638, s. 2008	Ratified
July 30, 2009	Shariff Aguak and Datu Unsay, Maguindanao	Creation of Datu Hoffer Ampatuan	MMAA 220	Ratified
July 30, 2009	Datu Saudi Ampatuan and Datu Piang, Maguindanao	Creation of Datu Salibo	MMAA 222	Ratified
July 30, 2009	Shariff Aguak, Mamasapano, Datu Unsay, Datu Saudi Ampatuan and Datu Piang, Maguindanao	Creation of Shariff Saydona Mustapha	MMAA 225	Ratified
November 25, 2009	Dasmariñas, Cavite	Cityhood of Dasmariñas	RA 9723	Ratified
June 23, 2012	Bacoor, Cavite	Cityhood of Bacoor	RA 10160	Ratified
June 30, 2013	Imus, Cavite	Cityhood of Imus	RA 10161	Ratified
July 21, 2012	Mabalacat, Pampanga	Cityhood of Mabalacat	RA 10164	Ratified
August 4, 2012	Cabuyao, Laguna	Cityhood of Cabuyao	RA 10163	Ratified
August 11, 2012	Ilagan, Isabela	Cityhood of Ilagan	RA 10169	Ratified
December 28, 2013	San Pedro, Laguna	Cityhood of San Pedro	RA 10420	Ratified
December 12, 2015	General Trias, Cavite	Cityhood of General Trias	RA 10675	Ratified
March 24, 2018	Dumalneg, Ilocos Norte	Creation of three barangays	RA 10955	Ratified
April 7, 2018	Bumbaran, Lanao del Sur	Renaming of Bumbaran to "Amai Manabilang"	MMAA 316	Ratified
September 7, 2019	Santo Tomas, Batangas	Cityhood of Santo Tomas	RA 11086	Ratified
September 3, 2022	Calaca, Batangas	Cityhood of Calaca	RA 11544	Ratified
December 17, 2022	Baliwag, Bulacan	Cityhood of Baliwag	RA 11929	Ratified
July 8, 2023	Carmona, Cavite	Cityhood of Carmona	RA 11938	Ratified
April 13, 2024	Aleosan, Carmen, Kabacan, Midsayap, Pigcawayan, Pikit, Cotabato	Creation of Kadayangan, Kapalawan, Ligawasan, Malidegao, Nabalawag, Old Kaabakan, Pahamuddin, Tugunan	BA 41–48	Ratified
June 29, 2024	Las Piñas	Redrawing of barangay boundaries	City Ord 941-23 s. 2023	Ratified
April 11, 2026	San Isidro, Davao del Norte	Renaming of San Isidro to "Sawata"	RA 11814	Ratified
November 21, 2026	Naga (Bicol)	Conversion of Naga to a highly urbanized city	PP 1267 s. 2026	Ratified

=== Barangay-level plebiscites ===
There have also been plebiscites in barangays for renaming them or creating new ones, either from certain sitios or by dividing and merging existing barangays. There have been hundreds of such plebiscites since the 1980s.

== People's initiative ==
People's initiative refers to either a mode for constitutional amendment provided by the 1987 Philippine Constitution or to a process of initiating a national or local measure under the Initiative and Referendum Act of 1987.

While there have been no successful national people's initiatives, there have been several attempts. In 2014, the People's Initiative against pork barrel gathered 10,000 signatures submitted to the Commission on Elections, but a referendum did not push through. In 2020, it was proposed that a people's initiative could be used to grant ABS-CBN a new franchise, but lawyer Emil Marañon described it as "legally problematic and practically impossible to hold."

Local initiatives are possible. The first recorded initiative under the Initiative and Referendum Act was in Barangay Milagrosa, Quezon City, aimed at addressing the influx of informal settlers and illegal drugs in 2011. The initiative passed, with 465 in favor and 384 against, out of 3,665 registered voters eligible to participate.

=== Local initiatives ===
Date	Location	Proposition	Result
May 14, 2011	Barangay Milagrosa, Quezon City	Banning illegal settlers, mendicants, abusive barangay officials, and drug trafficking	Ratified

== See also ==
- Recall elections in the Philippines
- Special elections in the Philippines
