= 1992 Philippine provincial creation plebiscites =

- May 11, 1992
- Creation of the provinces of Biliran and Guimaras

Creation of the province of Biliran
For	77.49%
Against	22.51%

Creation of the province of Guimaras
For	86.95%
Against	13.05%

Plebiscites were held in the Philippine provinces of Leyte and Iloilo on May 11, 1992, to decide on the creation of the provinces of Biliran and Guimaras, respectively. These were conducted concurrently with the 1992 Philippine general election.

== Biliran creation plebiscite ==
Biliran is already a sub-province of Leyte province. On May 11, 1992, a plebiscite was held in Leyte to determine if Biliran was to become a fully fledged province. The results are as follows:

1992 Biliran provincial creation plebiscite
Choice	Votes	%
For	157,808	77.49
Against	45,851	22.51
Total	203,659	100.00
Source: Philippine Daily Inquirer via Geocities

== Guimaras creation plebiscite ==
Guimaras is already a sub-province of Iloilo province. On May 11, 1992, a plebiscite was held in Iloilo to determine if Guimaras was to become a fully fledged province. The results are as follows:

1992 Guimaras provincial creation plebiscite
Choice	Votes	%
For	283,224	86.95
Against	42,524	13.05
Total	325,748	100.00
Source: Caram and Laban ng Demokratikong Pilipino vs. Commission on Elections and Iloilo Provincial Board of Canvassers

A Supreme Court case argued for the holding of a special election in the Iloilo's 2nd congressional district as there were several abstentions in Guimaras for the said position. The petitioners argued that the Guimaras voters expected that they won't have to vote for congressman as they shall elect their own congressman once the plebiscite passes. The Supreme Court dismissed the case, saying "those who did not vote for the position of congressman, merely abstained from voting for the said position".
