= 1969 Quirino sub-provincial creation plebiscite =

November 11, 1969

Results
Choice	Votes	%
Yes	4,519	73.22%
No	1,653	26.78%
Total votes	6,172	100.00%

The 1969 Quirino sub-provincial creation plebiscite was a plebiscite on separating the sub-province of Quirino from the province of Nueva Vizcaya in terms of provincial administration in accordance with Republic Act No. 5554 that was enacted on June 21, 1969. The law provided a separate provincial board for the sub-province of Quirino while retaining it within Nueva Vizcaya's congressional district.

The plebiscite was held on November 11, 1969, and the results were announced on December 23, 1969.

== Results ==
=== Summary ===
Choice	Votes	%
For	4,519	73.22
Against	1,653	26.78
Total	6,172	100.00
Source: Bureau of Printing

=== By municipality ===
Municipality	Yes	No
Aglipay	961	560
Diffun	1,619	467
Maddela	1,323	412
Saguday	616	214
Total	4,519	1,653
Source: Bureau of Printing
