= 1989 Autonomous Region in Muslim Mindanao creation plebiscite =

← 1977	November 17, 1989	2001 →
- Outcome: Approved in six provinces; Rejected in 12 other provinces and 8 cities; Creation of the Autonomous Region in Muslim Mindanao (ARMM)
- Results by locality

The 1989 Autonomous Region in Muslim Mindanao creation plebiscite was a creation plebiscite held on November 17, 1989, in parts of Mindanao and Palawan in the Philippines.

== Background ==
Upon the installation of President Corazon Aquino following the 1986 People Power Revolution which deposed Ferdinand Marcos, the Moro National Liberation Front (MNLF) held negotiations in with the Aquino administration in Jeddah. The MNLF pushed for the government for the outright establishment of an autonomous region in Mindanao as per the 1976 Tripoli Agreement through an executive order; a demand which the government did not accept.

The 1987 Constitution of the Philippines adopted during Aquino's presidency allows for the creation of an autonomous region in "Muslim Mindanao". Republic Act No. 6734 or the Organic Act which proposed for the creation of such region called the Autonomous Region in Muslim Mindanao (ARMM) was signed into law on August 1, 1989, by President Corazon Aquino but had to be ratified through a plebiscite which was held on November 17, 1989.

Both the MNLF, and its splinter group the Moro Islamic Liberation Front, boycotted the vote.

== Results ==
=== Rules ===
The plebiscite is conducted on a per-province and per-city basis.

- If there are more votes for autonomy in a province, that province becomes a part of the autonomous region.
- If there are more votes for autonomy in a city, that city becomes a part of the autonomous region, regardless if how its mother province votes.
- If there are more votes against autonomy in a municipality, but its mother province votes in favor, that municipality still becomes a part of the autonomous region
- If there are more votes for autonomy in a municipality, but its mother province votes against, that municipality does not become a part of the autonomous region

=== Summary ===
Only four provinces namely Lanao del Sur, Maguindanao, Sulu and Tawi-Tawi opted to be included in the newly formed ARMM. The Muslim-majority province of Basilan and the city of Marawi in Lanao del Sur notably voted against its inclusion to the ARMM. Elections for the first set of regional officials were held in February 1990.

The following are the results for the province and city.

Summary of results
Locality	Yes		No		Valid votes		Registered voters	Ratified?
Locality	Total	%	Total	%	Total	%	Registered voters	Ratified?
Basilan	20,924	36.57%	36,286	63.43%	57,210	55.40%	103,272	No
Cotabato	26,734	18.92%	114,568	81.08%	141,302	50.35%	280,624	No
Cotabato City	12,986	9.56%	122,851	90.44%	135,837	55.00%	246,979	No
Davao del Sur	46,892	37.95%	76,682	62.05%	123,574	70.31%	175,751	No
Dapitan	462	2.34%	19,307	97.66%	19,769	69.63%	28,392	No
Dipolog	845	3.40%	24,009	96.60%	24,854	62.87%	39,532	No
General Santos	8,223	19.67%	33,577	80.33%	41,800	40.37%	103,549	No
Iligan	2,044	3.19%	61,983	96.81%	64,027	59.05%	108,432	No
Lanao del Norte	46,892	37.95%	76,682	62.05%	123,574	70.31%	175,751	No
Lanao del Sur	125,338	74.08%	43,855	25.92%	169,193	71.37%	237,076	Yes
Maguindanao	76,717	62.68%	45,670	37.32%	122,387	45.70%	267,824	Yes
Marawi	10,399	46.01%	12,204	53.99%	22,603	56.13%	40,269	No
Pagadian	4,774	19.15%	20,149	80.85%	24,923	50.67%	49,188	No
Palawan	8,162	9.09%	81,617	90.91%	89,779	54.48%	164,789	No
Puerto Princesa	3,283	14.23%	19,796	85.77%	23,079	51.11%	45,155	No
South Cotabato	26,198	15.87%	138,841	84.13%	165,039	52.22%	316,043	No
Sultan Kudarat	5,601	7.33%	70,827	92.67%	76,428	49.76%	153,589	No
Sulu	99,911	73.92%	35,245	26.08%	135,156	57.96%	233,181	Yes
Tawi-Tawi	40,596	72.86%	15,125	27.14%	55,721	56.26%	99,039	Yes
Zamboanga del Norte	5,872	4.12%	136,766	95.88%	142,638	53.58%	266,191	No
Zamboanga del Sur	14,543	6.43%	211,782	93.57%	226,325	55.83%	405,392	No
Zamboanga City	5,299	5.55%	90,152	94.45%	95,451	53.77%	177,533	No
Total					1,968,900	54.69%	3,599,984	—

Of the 3.5 million registered voters, 55.31% turned out and voted. 72% of those who voted rejected autonomy. In Christian areas, autonomy was rejected in 40-to-1 margins.

The new autonomous region was inaugurated on November 6, 1990. The region would be expanded following a second plebiscite in 2001.
