= 2001 Autonomous Region in Muslim Mindanao expansion and inclusion plebiscite =

- August 14, 2001
- Plebiscite for the approval of Republic Act No. 9054
- Outcome: Ratification of Republic Act No. 9054 by the original components of the ARMM; Approved inclusion to the ARMM by Basilan and Marawi; Rejected inclusion to the ARMM by other areas
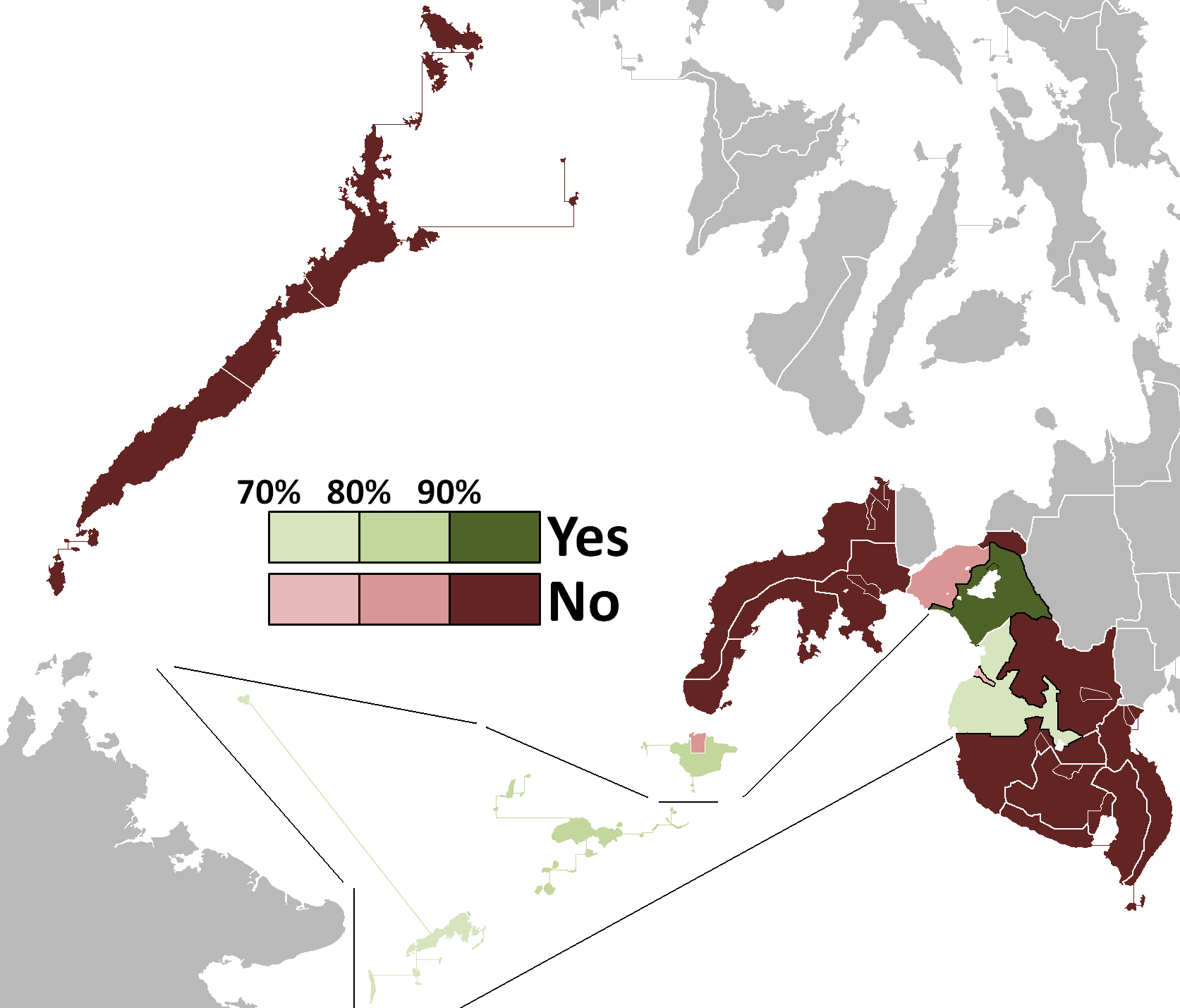
- Results by locality
- Result of the plebiscite. The votes for each province and city (whether highly urbanized, independent component, or component) are treated separately and are not combined into a single result.

The 2001 Autonomous Region in Muslim Mindanao expansion and inclusion plebiscite was a plebiscite held in parts of Mindanao and Palawan, Philippines, that ratified Republic Act No. 9054, expanded the Autonomous Region in Muslim Mindanao (ARMM), and determined which additional provinces and cities would be included in the autonomous region.

Republic Act No. 9054, also known as the "Organic Act for the Autonomous Region in Muslim Mindanao," was enacted on March 31, 2001, to amend and expand the ARMM's original organic act, Republic Act No. 6734. A special plebiscite was set for August 14, 2001. Voters in the four existing ARMM provinces voted on whether to ratify the amendments to the region's organic act, while voters in provinces and cities designated for inclusion voted on whether their respective localities would be included in the expanded autonomous region.

The four existing ARMM provinces voted in favor of the amendments to the organic act. Among the provinces and cities voting on inclusion, only Basilan and the city of Marawi voted in favor of joining the ARMM. Basilan approved inclusion, while Isabela City voted against inclusion. As a result, Basilan, except for Isabela City, and Marawi were included in the expanded ARMM.

== Results ==
=== Rules ===
Each province, and their component cities, has their own separate plebiscite. In order for the plebiscite to be approved, a majority of the people who voted is needed, if it fails to surpass the majority of valid votes, the plebiscite is defeated in that province or city.

- For provinces voted for expansion and amendments to the original organic act:
  - If a majority did not vote in favor, all amendments to the organic act, save for provinces and cities that voted for inclusion, are rejected.
- For provinces and cities voting for inclusion:
  - If a majority in each city or province votes in favor, it becomes a part of the autonomous region; in case of component cities, they do not cease to be a part of their province but regional services will be under the ARMM.
  - If a majority in a municipality does not vote in favor of inclusion but the totals for the rest of the province are in favor it will be a part of the ARMM nevertheless.

Provinces and cities that approved expansion (for already members) and inclusion (for non-members) are highlighted:

=== Summary ===
Support from within the ARMM was overwhelmingly in favor, with all four provinces having at least 70% of those who voted in favor of expanding the region. Those which were asked for inclusion, on the other hand, were overwhelmingly opposed, with most provinces and cities having more than 90% of those who voted opposing inclusion, with the exception of Basilan (91%), which voted overwhelmingly for inclusion (its capital Isabela City voted not to be included) and Marawi (which is part of Lanao del Sur which already within the ARMM).

=== Expansion ===
- Question: Do you vote in favor of the amendments to Republic Act No. 6734, the Organic Act for the Autonomous Region in Muslim Mindanao, as proposed under this Organic Act, which includes, among other things, the expansion of the area of the autonomous region?

Province	Yes		No		Total	Ratified?
Province	Total	%	Total	%	Total	Ratified?
Lanao del Sur	185,212	91.27%	17,718	8.73%	202,930	Yes
Maguindanao	175,893	71.95%	68,561	28.05%	244,454	Yes
Sulu	75,320	86.54%	11,711	13.46%	87,031	Yes
Tawi-Tawi	44,159	76.77%	13,363	23.23%	57,522	Yes
Total					591,937	—N/a

=== Inclusion ===
- Question: Do you vote in favor of the inclusion of your province or city in the Autonomous Region in Muslim Mindanao?

Locality	Yes		No		Total	Ratified?
Locality	Total	%	Total	%	Total	Ratified?
Basilan	185,212	89.33%	22,121	10.67%	207,333	Yes
Cotabato City	9,361	36.80%	16,075	63.20%	25,436	No
Dapitan	413	1.84%	22,073	98.16%	22,486	No
Davao del Sur	3,074	2.32%	129,695	97.68%	132,769	No
Digos	523	1.70%	30,176	98.30%	30,699	No
Dipolog	777	2.68%	28,171	97.32%	28,948	No
General Santos	1,277	1.53%	82,251	98.47%	83,528	No
Iligan	1,604	2.54%	61,472	97.46%	63,076	No
Isabela City	3,656	20.04%	14,588	79.96%	18,244	No
Kidapawan	468	2.09%	21,887	97.91%	22,355	No
Koronadal	170	0.51%	33,288	99.49%	33,458	No
Lanao del Norte	27,235	16.62%	136,600	83.38%	163,835	No
Marawi	26,362	91.56%	2,429	8.44%	28,791	Yes
Cotabato	16,603	9.02%	167,531	90.98%	184,134	No
Pagadian	636	1.96%	31,846	98.04%	32,482	No
Palawan	1,717	1.49%	113,839	98.51%	115,556	No
Puerto Princesa	402	1.11%	35,763	98.89%	36,165	No
Sarangani	2,359	3.23%	70,727	96.77%	73,086	No
South Cotabato	2,497	1.89%	129,483	98.11%	131,980	No
Sultan Kudarat	4,782	3.97%	115,571	96.03%	120,353	No
Tacurong	187	0.97%	19,076	99.03%	19,263	No
Zamboanga City	5,849	4.93%	112,735	95.07%	118,584	No
Zamboanga del Norte	6,540	3.97%	158,125	96.03%	164,665	No
Zamboanga del Sur	4,759	2.83%	163,628	97.17%	168,387	No
Zamboanga Sibugay	6,843	6.60%	96,830	93.40%	103,673	No
Total					2,129,286	—N/a

== See also ==
- 2001 Autonomous Region in Muslim Mindanao general election
