= Sub-provinces of the Philippines =

Former administrative division of the Philippines

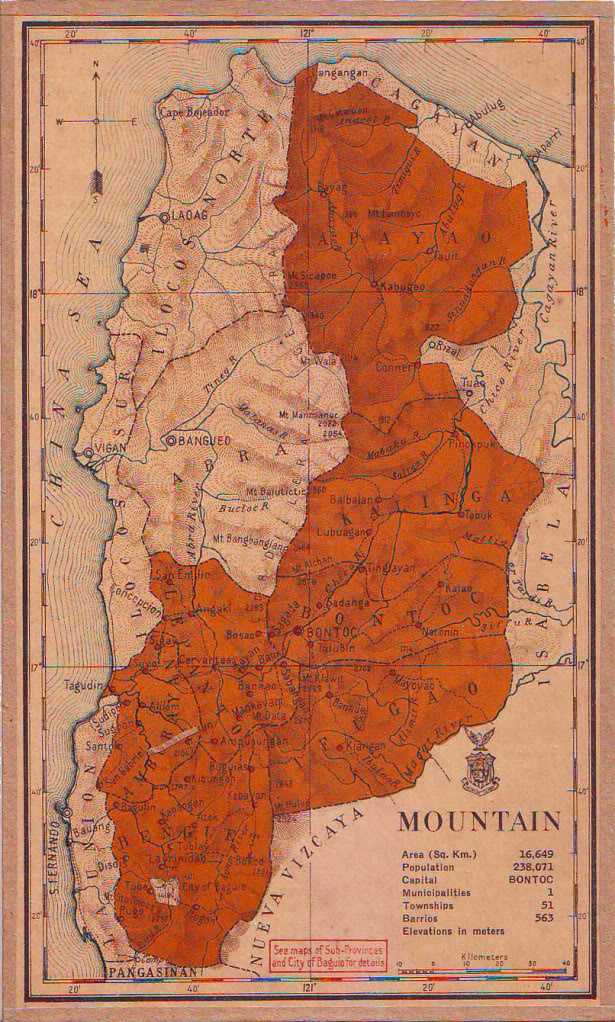
- Map of the Mountain Province showing its extent in 1918. The map shows borders of its sub-provinces.
- Category: Province sub-unit
- Location: Philippines
- Found in: Provinces
- Subdivisions: Municipalities and component cities

The sub-provinces of the Philippines were a political and administrative division of the Philippines. The sub-provinces were a part of a larger "regular" province and residents of a sub-province participated in provincial elections of the parent province.

== List of historical sub-provinces ==
Sub-province	Parent province	Established	Disestablished	Fate
Abra	Ilocos Sur	April 1, 1905	March 9, 1917	Already recognized as a regular province in 1901 (Act No. 206). Annexed to Ilocos Sur as a sub-province in 1905 (Act No. 1306). Became a regular province again in 1917 (Act No. 2683).
Amburayan	Lepanto-Bontoc (1902–1908); Mountain Province (1908–1920)	May 28, 1902	February 4, 1920	Territory organized as a sub-province of Lepanto-Bontoc in 1902 (Act No. 410). Transferred to newly created Mountain Province upon abolition of Lepanto-Bontoc in 1908 (Act No. 1876). Most of territory annexed to Ilocos Sur and La Union in 1917 (Act No. 2711). Abolished in 1920 when its remaining territory was annexed to the sub-province of Benguet in the Mountain Province (Act No. 2877).
Apayao	Cagayan (1907–1908); Mountain Province (1908–1966); Kalinga-Apayao (1966–1995)	May 9, 1907	May 8, 1995	Territory organized as a sub-province of Cagayan in 1907 (Act No. 1642). Transferred to newly created Mountain Province in 1908 (Act No. 1876). Transferred to newly created Kalinga-Apayao province in 1966 (Republic Act No. 4695). Became a regular province in 1995 (Republic Act No. 7878).
Aurora	Quezon	June 14, 1951	August 13, 1979	Established as a sub-province of Quezon in 1951 (Republic Act No. 648). Became a regular province in 1979 upon proclamation of result of plebiscite ratifying Batas Pambansa Blg. 7.
Batanes	Cagayan	August 20, 1907	May 20, 1909	Spanish-era province abolished and territory annexed to Cagayan in 1901 (Act No. 209). Organized as a sub-province of Cagayan in 1907 (Act No. 1693). Became a province again in 1909 (Act No. 1952).
Benguet	Mountain Province	August 18, 1908	June 18, 1966	Already recognized as a regular province in 1900 (Act No. 49). Annexed to newly created Mountain Province in 1908 (Act No. 1876). Became a regular province again in 1966 (Republic Act No. 4695).
Biliran	Leyte	April 8, 1959	May 11, 1992	Established as a sub-province of Leyte in 1959 (Republic Act No. 2141). Became a regular province in 1992 upon ratification of Section 462 of Republic Act No. 7160.
Bontoc	Lepanto-Bontoc (1902–1908); Mountain Province (1908–1966)	May 28, 1902	June 18, 1966	Territory organized as a sub-province of Lepanto-Bontoc in 1902 (Act No. 410). Transferred to newly created Mountain Province upon abolition of Lepanto-Bontoc in 1908 (Act No. 1876). Became a regular province and assumed the name Mountain Province upon separation of other component sub-provinces in 1966 (Republic Act No. 4695).
Bukidnon	Agusan	August 20, 1907	September 1, 1914	Territory organized as a sub-province of Agusan in 1907 (Act No. 1693). Agusan Province (composed of Bukidnon and Butuan sub-provinces) placed under the Department of Mindanao and Sulu in 1913 (Act No. 2309). Separated from Butuan sub-province and became a province within the Department of Mindanao and Sulu in 1914 (Act No. 2408).
Butuan	Agusan	August 20, 1907	September 1, 1914	Territory organized as a sub-province of Agusan in 1907 (Act No. 1693). Agusan Province (composed of Bukidnon and Butuan sub-provinces) placed under the Department of Mindanao and Sulu in 1913 (Act No. 2309). Separated from Bukidnon and became a province within the Department of Mindanao and Sulu under the name Agusan in 1914 (Act No. 2408).
Camiguin	Misamis Oriental	June 22, 1956	June 18, 1966	Established as a sub-province of Misamis Oriental in 1956 (Republic Act No. 2021). Became a regular province in 1966 (Republic Act No. 4669).
Catanduanes	Albay	April 19, 1905	October 26, 1945	Established as a sub-province of Albay in 1905 (Act No. 1331). Became a regular province in 1945 (Commonwealth Act No. 687).
Guimaras	Iloilo	June 18, 1966	May 11, 1992	Established as a sub-province of Iloilo in 1966 (Republic Act No. 4667). Became a regular province in 1992 upon ratification of Section 462 of Republic Act No. 7160.
Ifugao	Mountain Province	August 18, 1908	June 18, 1966	Territory annexed from northwestern area of Nueva Vizcaya organized as a sub-province of the newly created Mountain Province in 1908 (Act No. 1876). Became a regular province in 1966 (Republic Act No. 4695).
Kalinga	Lepanto-Bontoc (1907–1908); Mountain Province (1908–1966); Kalinga-Apayao (1966–1995)	May 9, 1907	May 8, 1995	Territory organized as a sub-province of Lepanto-Bontoc in 1907 (Act No. 1642). Transferred to newly created Mountain Province upon abolition of Lepanto-Bontoc in 1908 (Act No. 1876). Transferred to newly created Kalinga-Apayao province in 1966 (Republic Act No. 4695). Became a regular province in 1995 (Republic Act No. 7878).
Lepanto	Lepanto-Bontoc (1907–1908); Mountain Province (1908–1920)	May 28, 1902	February 4, 1920	Territory organized as a sub-province of Lepanto-Bontoc in 1902 (Act No. 410). Transferred to newly created Mountain Province upon abolition of Lepanto-Bontoc in 1908 (Act No. 1876). Abolished in 1920 when its territory was annexed to Ilocos Sur and the sub-province of Bontoc in the Mountain Province (Act No. 2877).
Marinduque	Tayabas	August 10, 1907	November 21, 1920	Already recognized as a province in 1901 (Act No. 125). Province abolished and territory annexed to Tayabas in 1902 (Act No. 499). Established as a sub-province in 1907 (Act No. 1649). Became a regular province again in 1920 (Act No. 2880).
Masbate	Sorsogon	January 1, 1906	December 15, 1920	Already recognized as a province in 1901 (Act No. 105). Annexed to Sorsogon as a sub-province in 1906 (Act No. 1413). Became a regular province again in 1920 (Act No. 2934).
Quirino	Nueva Vizcaya	June 18, 1966	November 11, 1971	Established as a sub-province of Nueva Vizcaya in 1966 (Republic Act No. 4734). Became a regular province upon ratification of Republic Act No. 6394 in 1971.
Romblon	Capiz	July 15, 1907	December 7, 1917	Already recognized as a province in 1901 (Act No. 104). Annexed to Capiz as a sub-province in 1907 (Act No. 1665). Became a regular province again in 1917 (Act No. 2724).
Siquijor	Negros Oriental	October 8, 1907	November 11, 1971	Established as a sub-province of Negros Oriental in 1907 (Act No. 1753). Became a regular province upon ratification of Republic Act No. 6398 in 1971.
