= Mindanao =

Island in the Philippines

Native name: Pulu nu Mindanaw (Maguindanaon); Polo o Mindanao (Maranao); Pu sin Mindanaw (Tausug); Pu'yù to Mindanao (Manobo languages); Pulu' ni Mindanaw (Central Subanen)
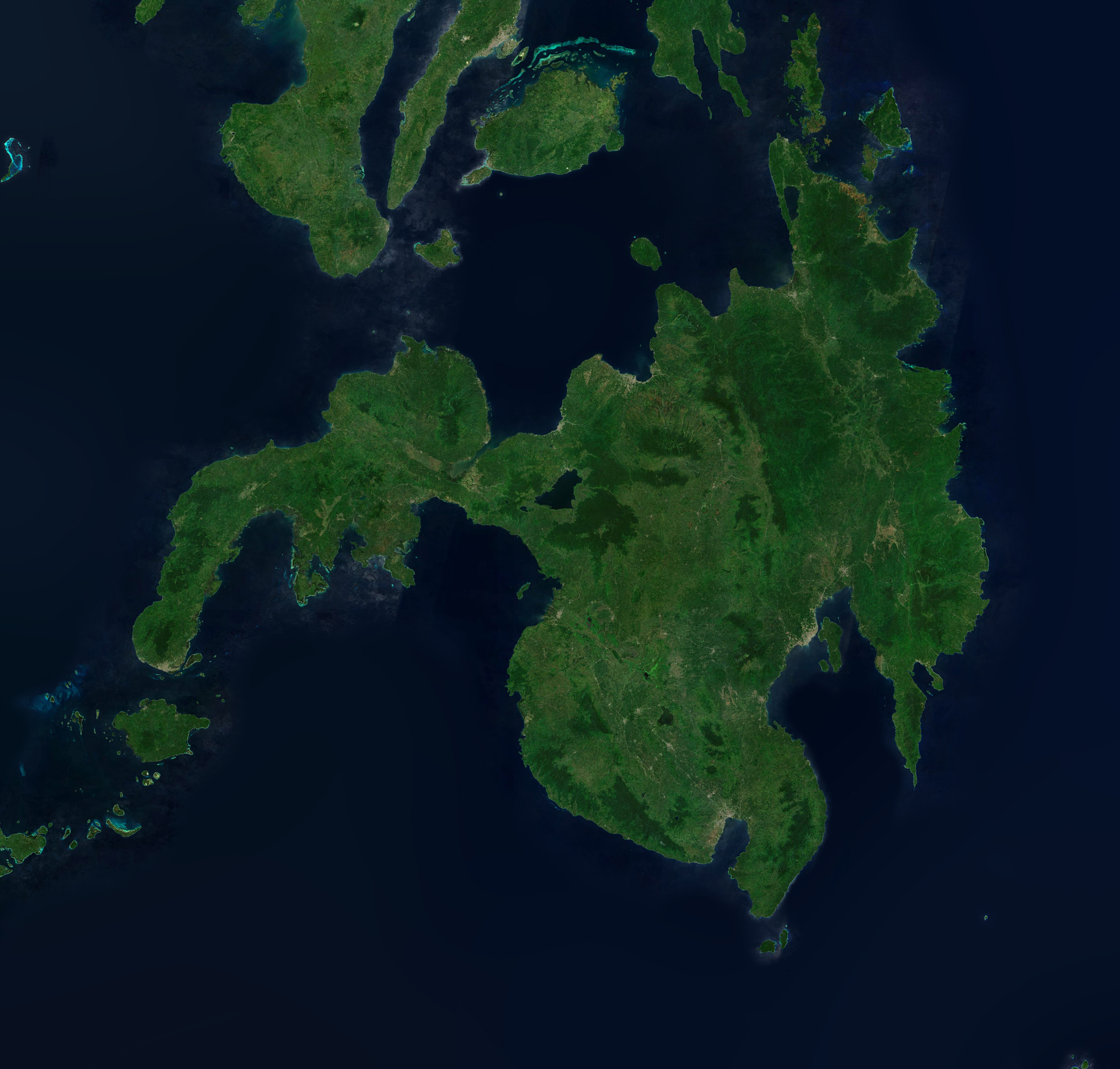
- Composite satellite image of Mindanao captured by Sentinel-2 in 2019

- Location within Philippines
- Etymology: Land of the Lakes

Geography
- Location: Philippines
- Coordinates: 8°00′N 125°00′E
- Archipelago: Philippine
- Adjacent to: Bohol Sea; Celebes Sea; Philippine Sea; Sulu Sea; Surigao Strait
- Major islands: Mindanao; Basilan; Jolo; Tawi-Tawi; Bucas Grande; Dinagat; Siargao; Samal; Camiguin
- Area: 97,530 km^{2} (37,660 sq mi)
- Area rank: 19th (Global)
- Highest elevation: 2,954 m (9692 ft)
- Highest point: Mount Apo

Administration
- Philippines
- Regions: Region 9 – Zamboanga Peninsula; Region 10 – Northern Mindanao; Region 11 – Davao Region; Region 12 – Soccsksargen; Region 13 – Caraga Region; Bangsamoro Autonomous Region in Muslim Mindanao
- Provinces: List: Agusan del Norte; Agusan del Sur; Bukidnon; Cotabato; Davao del Norte; Davao de Oro; Davao del Sur; Davao Occidental; Davao Oriental; Lanao del Norte; Lanao del Sur; Maguindanao del Norte; Maguindanao del Sur; Misamis Occidental; Misamis Oriental; Sarangani; South Cotabato; Sultan Kudarat; Surigao del Norte; Surigao del Sur; Zamboanga del Norte; Zamboanga del Sur; Zamboanga Sibugay; Outlying island provinces; Basilan; Camiguin; Dinagat Islands; Sulu; Tawi-Tawi
- Largest settlement: Davao City (pop. 1,848,947)

Demographics
- Demonym: Mindanaoan; Mindanawon; Mindanese (colloquial)
- Population: 27,384,138 (2024) (Mindanao island group)
- Pop. density: 243/km^{2} (629/sq mi)
- Ethnic groups: List: Visayan; (Cebuano; Hiligaynon; Boholano; Surigaonon; Butuanon; Davaoeño; Waray; Karay-a); Moro; (Banguingui; Iranun; Maguindanao; Maranao; Tausug; Sama-Bajau; Sangirese; Yakan); Lumad; (Blaan; Bukidnon; Subanon; Kamayo; Manobo/Bagobo; Mandaya; Mansaka; Tasaday; Tboli ); Negrito (Mamanwa); Ilocano; Zamboangueño / Zamboangueño Chavacano

Mindanao (/ˌmɪndəˈnaʊ/, MIN-də-NOW) is the second-largest island in the Philippines, after Luzon, and seventh-most populous island in the world. Located in the southern region of the archipelago, the island is part of an island group of the same name that also includes its adjacent islands, notably the Sulu Archipelago. According to the 2020 census, Mindanao had a population of 26,252,442, while the entire island group had an estimated population of 27,384,138 as of 2024.

Mindanao is divided into six administrative regions: the Zamboanga Peninsula, Northern Mindanao, the Caraga region, the Davao region, Soccsksargen, and the autonomous region of Bangsamoro. According to the 2024 census, Davao City is the most populous city on the island, with 1,848,947 people, followed by Zamboanga City (pop. 1,018,849), Cagayan De Oro (pop. 741,617), General Santos (pop. 722,059), Butuan (pop. 385,530), and Cotabato City (pop. 383,383).

The vast majority of Mindanao's residents declare affiliation to various Christian groups, tantamounting roughly to two thirds of the population, while the Islamic religion sums up the island's (and the country's) largest minority, which has been reported or estimated to represent from 15 to 25%. Ethnic minority groups in Mindanao whose members are predominantly Islamic account for most of Muslims in Philippines. The Bangsamoro Autonomous Region in Muslim Mindanao (BARMM) stands out as the most predominantly Islamic region, where, according to the 2020 census, above 89% of the population identified as Muslims. Reports on religious demographics are often considered unreliable or inaccurate, though, as Mindanao is a deeply-divided society. Humanists, atheists, Muslims, and other religious minorities are concerned about discrimination, and human rights abuses have been denounced. Therefore, the appropriate methodology to access its ethno-religious diversity is disputed. The Philippine government's inherent failure to measure religious demographics is also argued by the National Commission on Muslim Filipinos (NCMF).

Mindanao is considered the major breadbasket of the Philippines.

== Etymology ==
The name Mindanao is derived from a compound word in the Maguindanao language: min, a past tense verb prefix, and danao, meaning 'lake'. Together, they translate to 'land of where the lakes are found'. This name is also associated to the Maguindanaon people, where the Sultanate of Maguindanao once held significant influence, and where lakes with varying depths are also common among the provinces of Mindanao.

== History ==
=== Prehistory ===
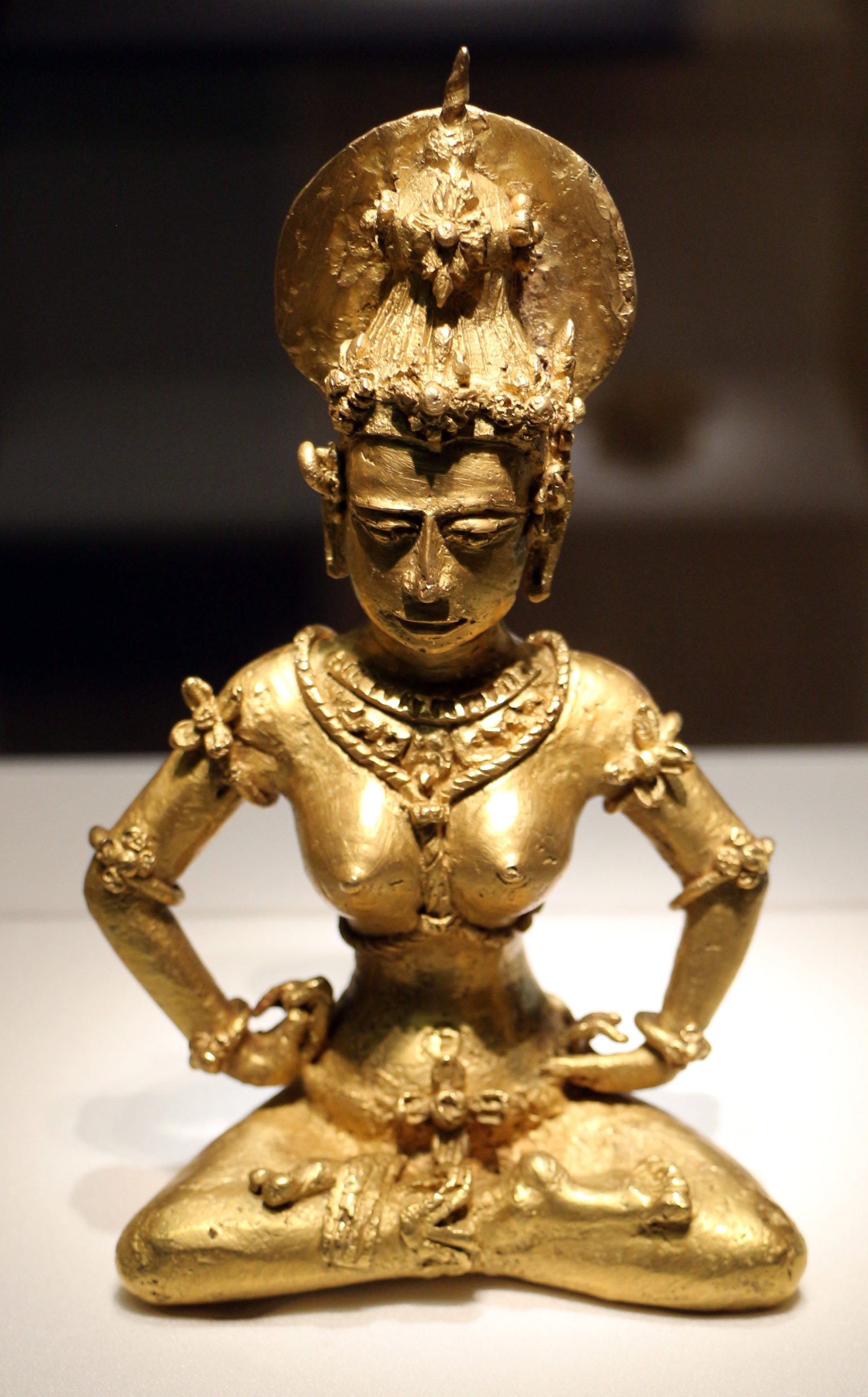
The 21-karat gold Agusan image statue (900–950 CE) discovered in 1917 on the banks of the Wawa River near Esperanza, Agusan del Sur

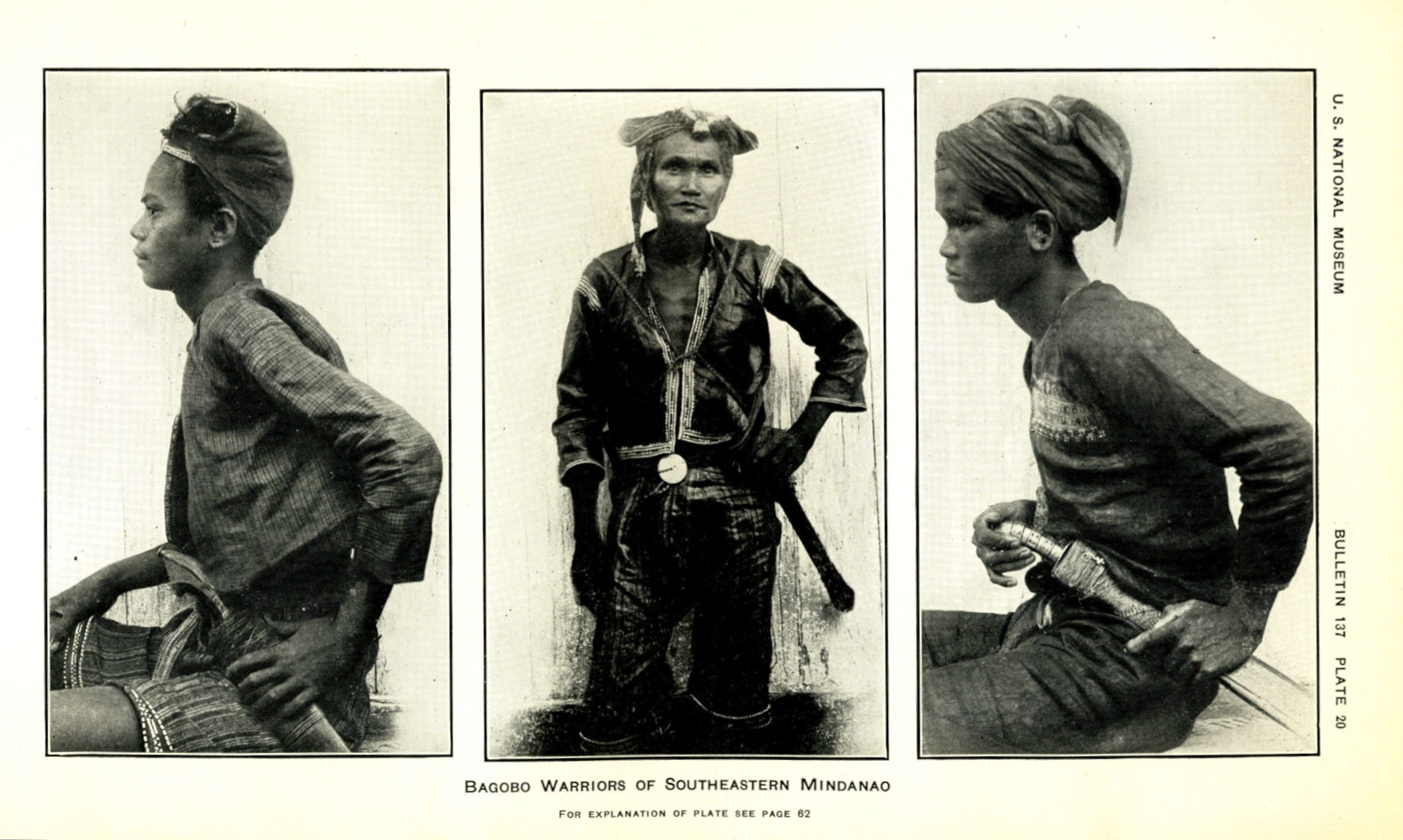
A 1926 photograph of Bagobo (Manobo) warriors

Archaeological findings on the island point to evidence of human activity dating back about ten thousand years. Around 1500 BC, Austronesian people spread throughout the Philippines.

The Subanon are believed to have settled in the Zamboanga Peninsula during the Neolithic era c. 4500–2000 BC. Evidence of stone tools in Zamboanga del Norte may indicate a late Neolithic presence. Ceramic burial jars, both unglazed and glazed, Chinese celadons, gold ornaments, beads, and bracelets have been found in caves. Many of the ceramic objects are from the Yuan and Ming periods. Evidently, there was a long history of trade between the Subanon and the Chinese.

=== Rajahnates and Hindu-Buddhism ===
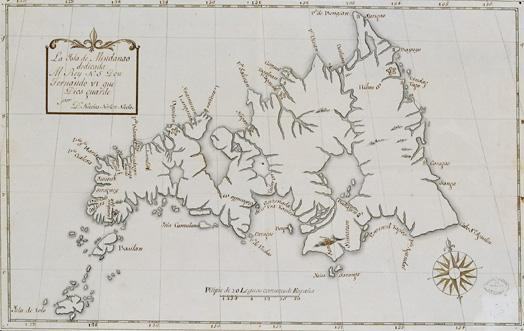
An old Spanish map of Mindanao island.

In the classic epoch of Philippine history (900 AD onwards), the people of Mindanao were heavily exposed to Hindu and Buddhist influence and beliefs from Indonesia and Malaysia. Indianized abugida scripts such as Kawi and baybayin were introduced from Java and an extinct intermediate from Sulawesi or Borneo respectively. Cultural icons of the sarong (known as malong or patadyong), the pudong turban, silk, and batik and ikat weaving and dyeing methods were introduced. Artifacts found from this era include a golden kinnara, a golden image believed by some to be a Tara, and a Ganesha pendant. These cultural traits passed from Mindanao into the Visayas and Luzon, but were subsequently lost or heavily modified after the Spanish arrival in the 16th century.

Hindu-Buddhist cultural influence took root in coastal settlements, syncretizing with indigenous animist beliefs and customs among the tribes of the interior. The Butuan Rajahnate, a Hinduized kingdom mentioned in Chinese records as a tributary state in the 10th century, was concentrated along the northeastern coast of Butuan Bay. The Rajahnate of Sanmalan in Zamboanga, was also in Mindanao. The Darangen epic of the Maranao people harkens back to this era as the most complete local version of the Ramayana. The Maguindanao at this time also had strong Hindu beliefs, evidenced by the Ladya Lawana (Rajah Ravana) epic saga that survives to the present, albeit highly Islamized from the 17th century onward.

=== Sultanates and Islam ===
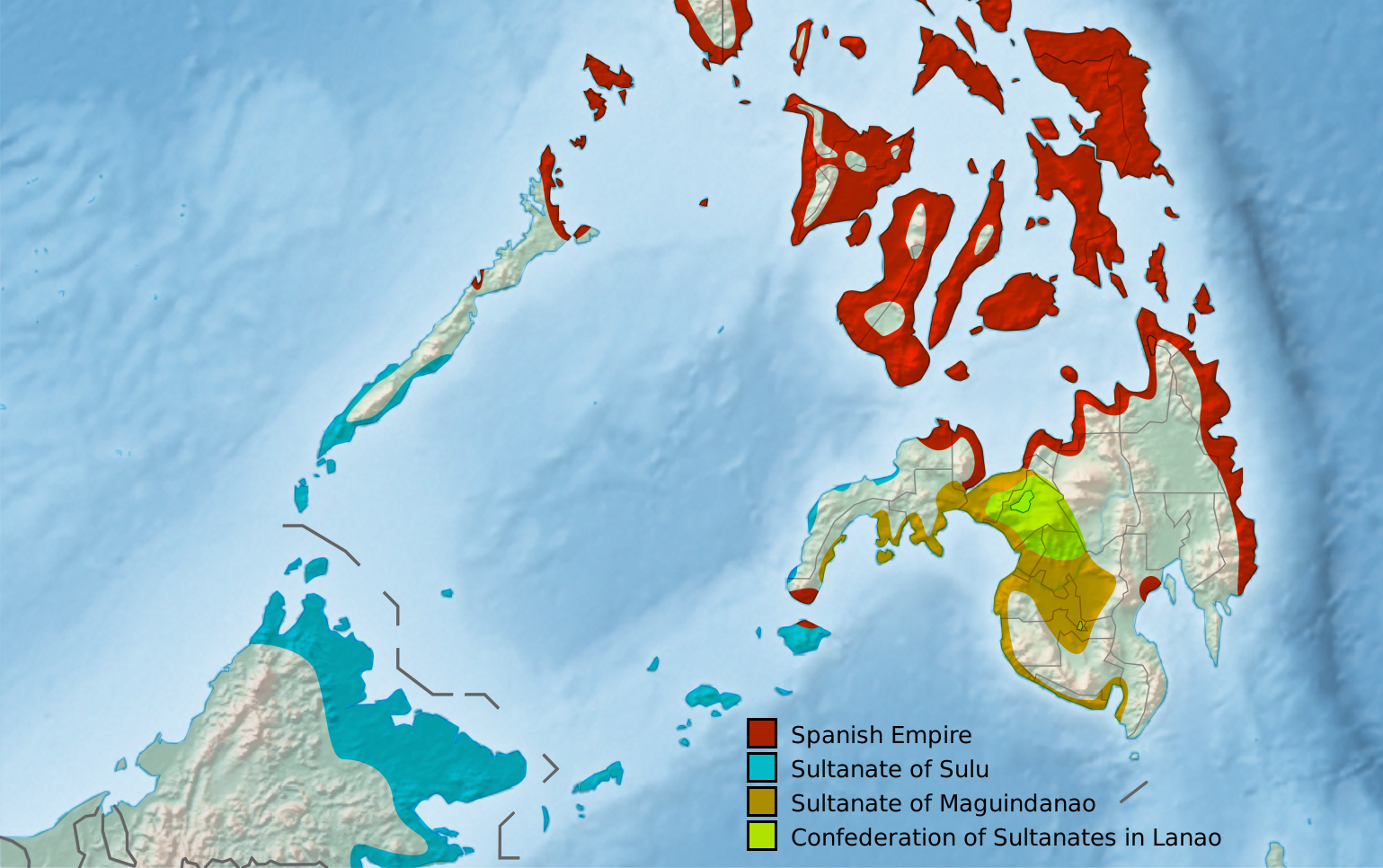
Approximate historical extent of the Muslim sultanates of Sulu, Maguindanao and Lanao in the 19th century

The spread of Islam in the Philippines began in the 14th century, mostly through the influence of Muslim merchants from the western Malay Archipelago. The first mosque in the Philippines was built in the mid-14th century in the town of Simunul, Tawi-Tawi. Around the 16th century, the Muslim sultanates of Sulu, Lanao and Maguindanao were established from formerly Hindu-Buddhist rajahnates.

As Islam colonised Mindanao, the natives of the sultanates had to either convert to Islam or pay tribute to their new Muslim rulers. The largest of the Muslim polities in mainland Mindanao was the Sultanate of Maguindanao, which controlled the southern floodplains of the Rio Grande de Mindanao and most of the coastal area of Illana Bay, Moro Gulf, Sarangani Bay and Davao Gulf. The name Mindanao was derived from this sultanate. But most of Mindanao remained animist, especially the Lumad people in the interior. Most of the northern, eastern, and southern coastal regions inhabited by Visayans (Surigaonon and Butuanon) and other groups were later converted to Christianity by the Spanish. Mindanao was then embroiled between a conflict with the Boholano (Visayan) Dapitan Kingdom and the Moluccan Sultanate of Ternate. Dapitan which was originally at Bohol was destroyed by an expeditionary force from the Ternate Sultanate and Dapitenyos were forced to relocate to Northern Mindanao where they waged war against the Sultanate of Lanao and established a new Dapitan there. Mindanaoans then spread out of Mindanao across Southeast Asia, Historian William Henry Scott, quoting the Portuguese manuscript Summa Orientalis, noted that Mottama in Burma (Myanmar) had a large presence of merchants from Mindanao.

=== Spanish colonization and Christianity ===
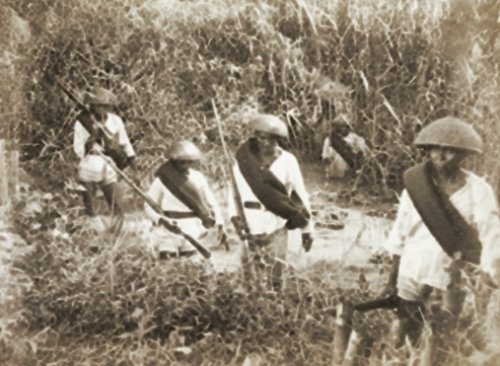
Christian Filipinos, who served under the Spanish Army, searching for Moro rebels during the Spanish–Moro conflict, c. 1887. The insurgency in Mindanao can be traced to the early 16th century.

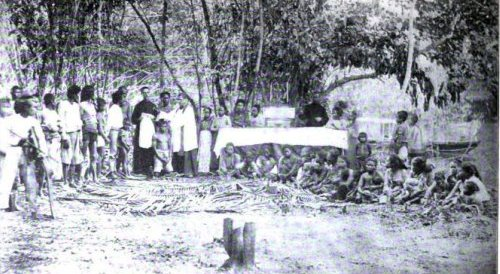
Two Spanish missionaries baptizing a Moro convert to Catholicism, circa 1890.

In 1521 Antonio Pigafetta wrote an account of reaching 'Maingdano.' He was with Magellan on the first circumnavigation of the globe and sailing for the king of Spain.

On February 2, 1543, Ruy López de Villalobos was the first Spaniard to reach Mindanao. He called the island "Caesarea Caroli" after Charles V of the Holy Roman Empire (and I of Spain). Shortly after Spain's colonization of Cebu, it moved on to colonize the Caraga region in northeast Mindanao and discovered a significant Muslim presence on the island. Over time a number of tribes in Mindanao converted to Catholicism and built settlements and forts throughout the coastal regions. These settlements endured despite attacks from neighboring Muslim sultanates. The most heavily fortified of them, apart from a short period in 1662 when Spain sent soldiers from the city to Manila after a threat of invasion from the Chinese general Koxinga, was Zamboanga City which was settled by soldiers from Peru and Mexico. The sultanates resisted Spanish pressure and attempts to convert them to Christianity during this period. The Sultanate of Ternate of the Maluku Islands formed a close alliance with the sultanates of Mindanao, especially Maguindanao. Ternate regularly sent military reinforcements to Mindanao to assist the local sultanates in their war against Spanish-controlled Manila.

By the late 18th century Spain had geographic dominance over the island, having established settlements and forts in most of Mindanao, including Zamboanga City and Misamis Occidental to the northwest, Iligan City, Misamis Oriental, Bukidnon, and Camiguin Island to the north, Surigao and Agusan in the Caraga region to the east, and Davao in the island's gulf coast. Spain continued to engage in battles with Muslim sultanates until the end of the 19th century.

At the same time as the Philippine revolution against Spain, the Republic of Zamboanga rose as a revolutionary state in Mindanao before it was absorbed by the oncoming Americans.

=== American occupation and Philippine Commonwealth ===
In the Treaty of Paris in 1898 Spain sold the entire Philippine archipelago to the United States for $20 million. The 1900 Treaty of Washington and the 1930 Convention Between the United States and Great Britain clarified the borders between Mindanao and Borneo.

In the early 1900s the Commonwealth government (led by Americans) encouraged citizens from Luzon and Visayas to migrate to Mindanao. Consisting mostly of Ilocanos, Cebuanos, and Ilonggos. Settlers streaming into Soccsksargen led to the displacement of the Blaan and Tboli tribes.

Together with Palawan, Mindanao was part of an acquisition proposal in 1910 between then-United States ambassador to Denmark Maurice Francis Egan and several of his Danish friends. Under the proposal, the United States was to trade Mindanao and Palawan to Denmark for Greenland and the Danish West Indies, and Denmark could then trade Mindanao and Palawan to German Empire for Northern Schleswig, which was then under German rule. Egan's suggestion faded away when World War I erupted, and Denmark eventually regained Northern Schleswig after the German defeat in World War I following the 1920 Schleswig plebiscites.

=== World War II ===
In April 1942 Mindanao, along with the rest of the Philippines, officially entered World War II after Japanese soldiers invaded key cities in the islands. Many towns and cities were burned to the ground in Mindanao, most notably Davao City, Zamboanga City, Lanao, Cagayan de Oro, Iligan City, and Butuan. In the months of April and May 1942, Japanese forces defeated US troops commanded by William F. Sharp and Guy Fort, in a battle that started at Malabang (a town close to Gandamatu Macadar, Lanao) and ended close to the town of Ganassi, Lanao. Davao City was among the earliest to be occupied by the invading Japanese forces. They immediately fortified the city as a bastion of the Japanese defense system.

Davao City was subjected by the returning forces of Gen. Douglas MacArthur to constant bombing before the American Liberation Forces landed in Leyte in October 1944. Filipino soldiers and local guerrilla fighters were actively fighting Japanese forces until liberation at the conclusion of the Battle of Mindanao.

=== Postwar era and Philippine independence ===
Mindanao was peaceful and increasingly progressive in the postwar period, including the 1950s and the mid-1960s. Ethnic tensions were minimal, and there was essentially no presence of secessionists groups in Mindanao.

=== Marcos era (1965–1986) ===
Under Ferdinand Marcos's administration, Christian groups began to settle in Mindanao, displacing many locals. The population boom resulted in conflicts as the original owners sought their ancestral land domains.

The Marcos administration encouraged new settlers who had emigrated to Mindanao to form a militia, which was eventually called the Ilaga. Anecdotal evidence states that the Ilaga often committed human rights abuses by targeting the Moro and Lumad people, as well as attempting to seize additional territory. It resulted in a lingering animosity between Moro and Christian communities. Mistrust and a cycle of violence are still felt today due to the creation of the Ilaga.

The Jabidah massacre in 1968 is commonly cited as the major flashpoint that ignited the Moro insurgency, and the ensuing ethnic tensions led to the formation of secessionist movements, such as the Muslim Independence Movement and the Bangsamoro Liberation Organization. These movements were largely political in nature, but the prohibition of political parties after Marcos' 1972 declaration of Martial Law led to the founding and dominance of armed groups such as the Moro National Liberation Front (MNLF), and the Moro Islamic Liberation Front (MILF). Ethnic conflicts continued to escalate, leading to incidents like the 1971 Manili massacre, the Pata Island massacre, and the Palimbang massacre.

Additionally, an economic crisis in late 1969 led to social unrest throughout the country, and violent crackdowns on protests led to the radicalization of many students, with some joining the New People's Army, bringing the New People's Army rebellion to Mindanao for the first time.

Marcos' declaration led to the shuttering of press outlets – television stations, national newspapers, weekly magazines, community newspapers, and radio stations – throughout the country, including in Mindanao. The remaining years of the Marcos dictatorship led to the killings of many Mindanao journalists, with prominent examples being Alex Orcullo of Mindanao Currents and Mindaweek, and Jacobo Amatong of the Mindanao Observer.

=== Fifth Republic (1986–present) ===
In 1989, the Autonomous Region in Muslim Mindanao (ARMM) was established, constituted by several provinces in Western Mindanao.

In March 2000, President Joseph Estrada declared an "All Out War" against the MILF after it committed a series of terrorist attacks on government buildings, civilians, and foreigners. A number of livelihood intervention projects, from organisations such as USAID and the Emergency Livelihood Assistance Program (ELAP), aided in the reconstruction of areas affected by constant battles on the island.

In December 2009, President Gloria Macapagal Arroyo officially placed Maguindanao under a state of martial law following the Maguindanao massacre.

On September 9, 2013, an MNLF faction attempted to raise the flag of a self-proclaimed Bangsamoro Republik at Zamboanga City Hall in an armed incursion into parts of the city.

On January 25, 2015, a shootout took place during a police operation by the Special Action Force (SAF) of the Philippine National Police (PNP) in Tukanalipao, Mamasapano, Maguindanao. The operation, codenamed Oplan Exodus, was intended to capture or kill wanted Malaysian terrorist and bomb-maker Zulkifli Abdhir and other Malaysian terrorists or high-ranking members of the Bangsamoro Islamic Freedom Fighters (BIFF).

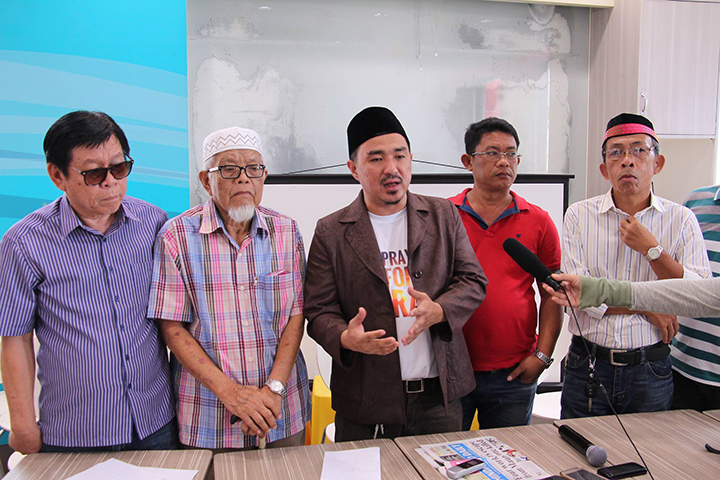
Lanao sultans making an open letter to Duterte urging for the quick resolution of the Marawi crisis

In May 2017, President Rodrigo Duterte declared martial law on the entire island group of Mindanao following the Marawi siege by the Maute terrorist group. More than 180,000 people were forced to evacuate Marawi City. Around 165 security forces and 47 residents were confirmed killed in the battle, although Marawi residents believe the number of civilians killed was far higher. The official death toll in the five-month conflict is 1,109, most of which were members of a militant alliance which drew fighters from radical factions of domestic Islamist groups.

In 2019, the Bangsamoro Autonomous Region in Muslim Mindanao was established, replacing the former ARMM.

In 2024, former President Rodrigo Duterte called for Mindanao to secede from the Philippines, reviving the movement started by congressman Pantaleon Alvarez. Secession calls resurfaced just before 2026, as proposed by some personalities in Cagayan de Oro; the inclusion of Palawan in the map planned by these individuals for submission to the United Nations Special Committee on Decolonization was denounced by Palawan officials the next month.

== Economy ==
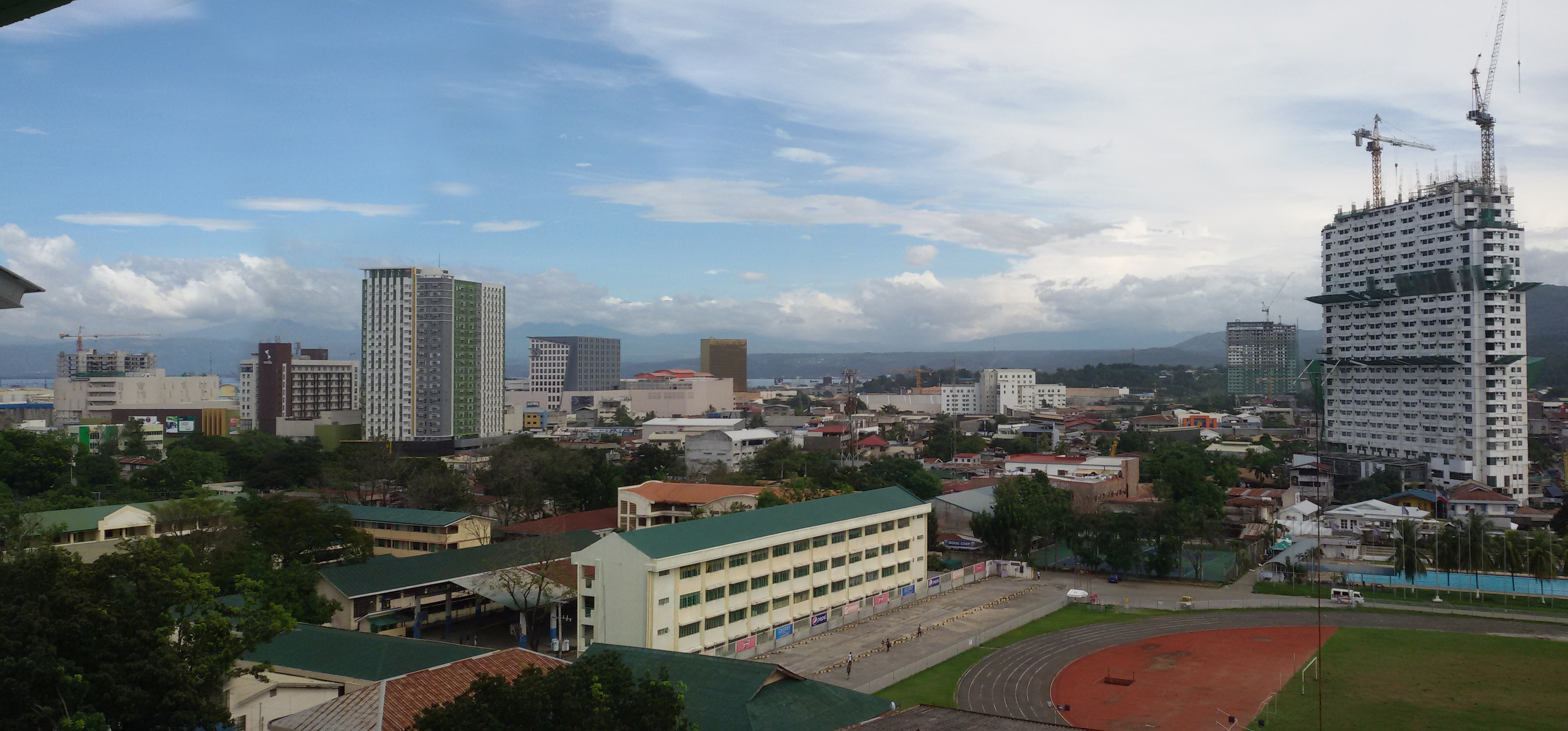
Cagayan de Oro skyline in 2018

Mindanao's economy accounts for 14% of the country's gross domestic product. The region grew 4.9% in 2016 against Luzon's 5.5% and Visayas' 9.1%.

Agriculture, forestry and fishing make up more than 40% of Mindanao's market, being the country's largest supplier of major crops such as pineapples and bananas.

There is one defined growth corridor in the island, namely Metro Davao. Other growth centers are: Cagayan de Oro, General Santos, Zamboanga City, Cotabato City, and Pagadian City.

Being the top-performing economy in Mindanao, Davao Region has the 5th-biggest economy in the country and the second-fastest-growing economy next to Cordillera Autonomous Region. While the region's economy is predominantly agri-based, it is now developing into a center for agro-industrial business, trade and tourism. Its competitive advantage is in agri-industry as its products, papayas, mangoes, bananas, pineapples, fresh asparagus, flowers, and fish products are exported internationally. The region can be a vital link to markets in other parts of Mindanao, Brunei Darussalam and parts of Malaysia and Indonesia.

There is also a growing call center sector in the region, mostly centered in Davao City.

=== Upcoming developments ===
Some 2,130 government-led infrastructure projects worth P547.9 billion have also been lined up for Mindanao until 2022.

NEDA officials said that 68% of that budget will be allotted to the transportation sector, while 16% will go to water resources, and 6% to social infrastructure.

Of this amount, 18 infrastructure projects have been identified as "flagship projects", five of them having already been approved by President Rodrigo Duterte.

The projects include the ₱35.26 billion Tagum-Davao-Digos Segment of the Mindanao Railway, the ₱40.57 billion Davao airport, the ₱14.62 billion Laguindingan airport, the ₱4.86 billion Panguil Bay Bridge Project, and the ₱5.44 billion Malitubog-Maridagao Irrigation Project, Phase II.

Projects in the pipeline are the second and third phases of the Mindanao Railway; the Agus-Pulangi plant rehabilitation; the Davao expressway; the Zamboanga Fish Port Complex rehabilitation; the Balo-i Plains Flood Control Project; Asbang Small Reservoir Irrigation Project; the Ambal Simuay Sub-Basin of the Mindanao River Basin Flood Control and River Protection Project; as well as the Road Network Development Project in Conflict-Affected Areas in Mindanao project.

=== Air transport ===
Francisco Bangoy International Airport serves as the main gateway to Mindanao, it is the busiest airport on the island and the third busiest in the Philippines in 2022.

Laguindingan Airport is the second-busiest airport along with Zamboanga International Airport as third-busiest in the island.

There are also smaller airports across Mindanao such as Bancasi Airport, General Santos International Airport, Labo Airport, Sayak Airport and Surigao Airport.

== Administrative divisions ==
The island consists of six administrative regions, 23 provinces, and 30 cities (28 provinces and 33 cities if associated islands are included).

Sulu was a part of the Bangsamoro Autonomous Region in Muslim Mindanao, but was excluded after the Supreme Court declared its inclusion in Bangsamoro unconstitutional as the majority of its residents voted against it during the 2019 plebiscite. Sulu was officially reverted to Zamboanga Peninsula, its original region before the establishment of the now-defunct Autonoumous Region of Muslim Mindanao, by the virtue of Executive Order No. 91, signed by President Bongbong Marcos on July 30, 2025.

Location	Region (designation)	Population (2024)	Area (Note: Land area figures are the sum of each region's component provinces (and/or independent cities), derived from the National Statistical Coordination Board (Philippine Statistics Authority) official website.)	Density	Regional center (capital region)	Component LGUs: Province; Independent city; ∗ Associated island (Note: The provinces of Basilan, Camiguin, Dinagat Islands, Sulu, and Tawi-Tawi are separate islands and/or island groups themselves, but are included under the island group of Mindanao.)
Map of the Philippines highlighting the Zamboanga Peninsula	Zamboanga; Peninsula (Region IX)	3,943,837 (3.1%)	17,056.73 km^{2} (6,585.64 sq mi)	200/km^{2} (520/sq mi)	Pagadian City	6: Isabela City* (Note: A component city, part of the province of Basilan, but whose regional services are provided by the offices of Region IX.); Sulu; Zamboanga City (Note: A highly urbanized city, independent from any province); Zamboanga del Norte; Zamboanga del Sur; Zamboanga Sibugay
Map of the Philippines highlighting Northern Mindanao	Northern; Mindanao (Region X)	5,178,326 (4.6%)	20,496.02 km^{2} (7,913.56 sq mi)	250/km^{2} (650/sq mi)	Cagayan de Oro	7: Bukidnon; Cagayan de Oro; Camiguin*; Iligan; Lanao del Norte; Misamis Occidental; Misamis Oriental
Map of the Philippines highlighting Davao Region	Davao Region (Region XI)	5,389,422 (4.8%)	20,357.42 km^{2} (7,860.04 sq mi)	260/km^{2} (670/sq mi)	Davao City	6: Davao de Oro; Davao City; Davao del Norte; Davao del Sur; Davao Oriental; Davao Occidental
Map of the Philippines highlighting Soccsksargen	Soccsksargen (Region XII)	4,462,776 (4.0%)	22,513.30 km^{2} (8,692.43 sq mi)	190/km^{2} (490/sq mi)	Koronadal	6: Cotabato (North); General Santos; Sarangani; South Cotabato; Sultan Kudarat
Map of the Philippines highlighting the Caraga Region	Caraga Region (Region XIII)	2,865,196 (2.6%)	21,478.35 km^{2} (8,292.84 sq mi)	130/km^{2} (340/sq mi)	Butuan	6: Agusan del Norte; Agusan del Sur; Butuan; Dinagat Islands*; Surigao del Norte; Surigao del Sur
Map of the Philippines highlighting the Autonomous Region in Muslim Mindanao	Bangsamoro Autonomous Region in Muslim; Mindanao (BARMM)	5,691,583 (4.5%)	12,535.79 km^{2} (4,840.10 sq mi)	390/km^{2} (1,000/sq mi)	Cotabato City	6: Basilan* (excluding Isabela City); Cotabato City (Note: An independent component city, not under the jurisdiction of any provincial government.); Lanao del Sur; Maguindanao del Norte; Maguindanao del Sur; Tawi-Tawi*
Table notes

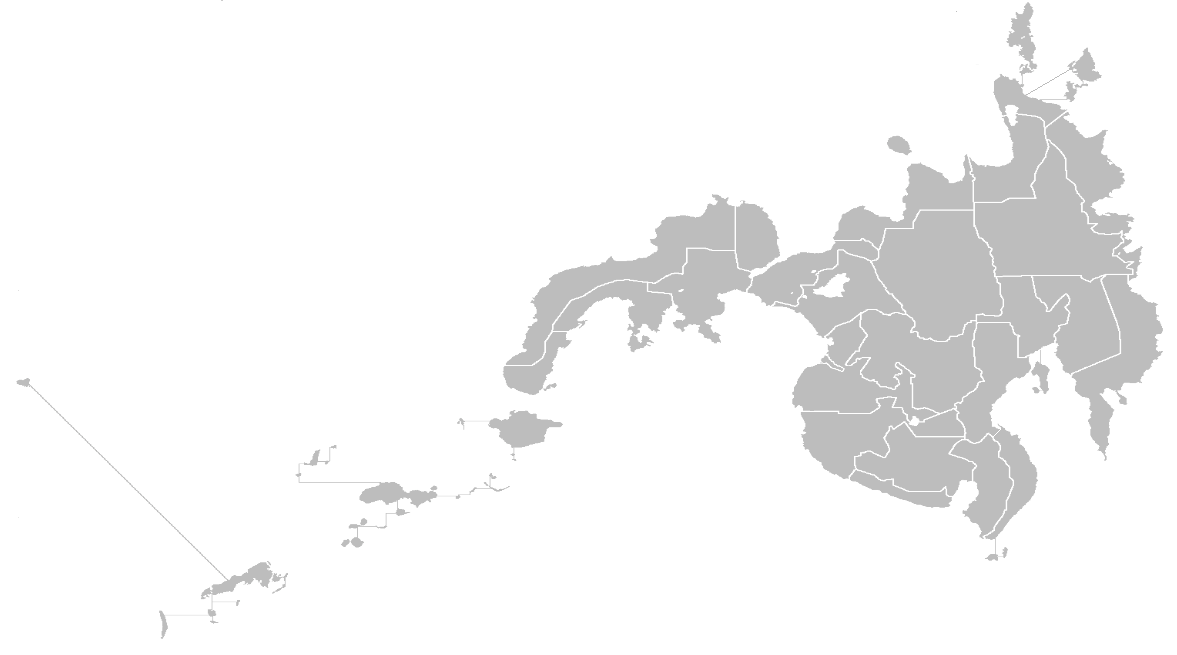

=== Largest cities and municipalities in Mindanao ===
The list of largest cities and municipalities in Mindanao in terms of population is shown in the table below.

Largest cities and municipalities in Mindanao PSA Census July 2024
Rank	Name	Region	Pop.	Rank	Name	Region	Pop.
1	Davao City	Davao Region	1,848,947	11	Panabo	Davao Region	211,242
2	Zamboanga City	Zamboanga Peninsula	1,018,849	12	Pagadian	Zamboanga Peninsula	206,483
3	Cagayan de Oro	Northern Mindanao	741,617	13	Koronadal	Soccsksargen	201,844
4	General Santos	Soccsksargen	722,059	14	Malaybalay	Northern Mindanao	195,046
5	Butuan	Caraga Region	385,530	15	Digos	Davao Region	192,063
6	Cotabato City	Bangsamoro	383,383	16	Surigao City	Caraga Region	177,333
7	Iligan	Northern Mindanao	368,132	17	Polomolok	Soccsksargen	176,671
8	Tagum	Davao Region	300,042	18	Kidapawan	Soccsksargen	160,864
9	Marawi	Bangsamoro	259,993	19	Mati	Davao Region	148,672
10	Valencia	Northern Mindanao	223,620	20	Ozamiz	Northern Mindanao	143,620

== Geography ==
Geofeatures map of Mindanao

Mindanao is the second-largest island in the Philippines at 97,530 square kilometres (37,660 sq mi), and is the seventh-most populous island in the world. The island is mountainous, and is home to Mount Apo, the highest mountain in the country. Mindanao is surrounded by four seas: the Sulu Sea to the west, the Philippine Sea to the east, the Celebes Sea to the south, and the Mindanao Sea to the north.

The island itself is part of an island group of the same name, which consists of the mainland, the Sulu Archipelago and the outlying islands of Camiguin, Dinagat, Siargao, and Samal.

=== Mountains ===
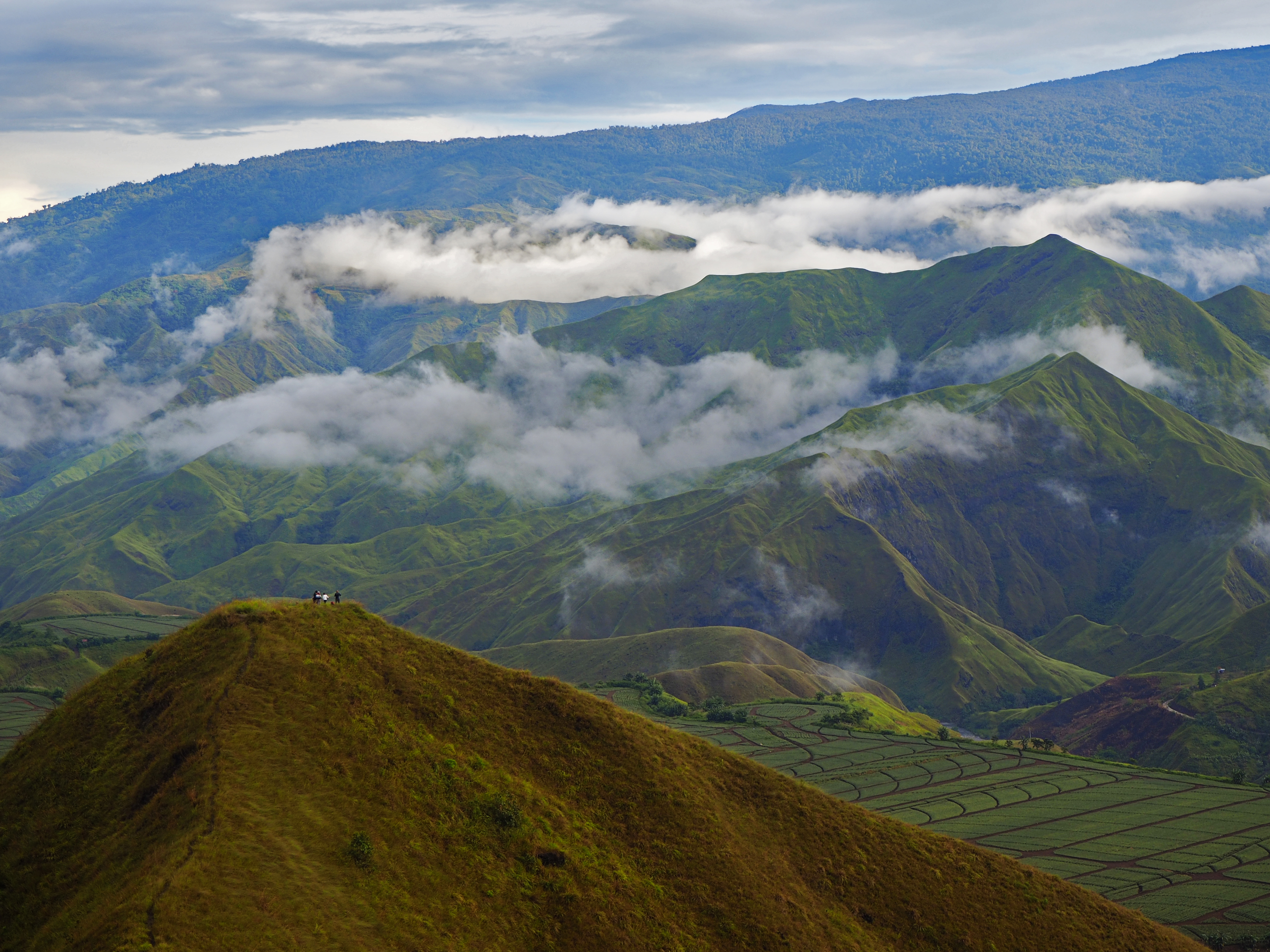
Mountains in the province of Bukidnon

The mountains of Mindanao can be grouped into ten ranges, including both complex structural mountains and volcanoes. The structural mountains on the extreme eastern and western portions of the island show broad exposures of Mesozoic rock, and Ultrabasic rocks at the surface in many places along the east coast. Other parts of the island consist mainly of Cenozoic and Quaternary volcanic or sedimentary rocks.

In the eastern portion of the island, from Bilas Point in Surigao del Norte to Cape San Agustin in Davao Oriental, is a range of complex mountains, called the Eastern Pacific Cordillera, known in their northern portion as the Diwata Mountains. This range is low and rolling in its central portion. A proposed road connecting Bislig on the east coast with the Agusan River would pass through 16 kilometers (9.9 mi) of broad saddle across the mountains at a maximum elevation of less than 250 meters (820 ft); while the existing east–west road from Lianga, 48 km (30 mi) north of Bislig, reaches a maximum elevation of only 450 m (1,480 ft). The Diwata Mountains, north of these low points, are considerably higher and more rugged, reaching an elevation of 2,012 m (6,601 ft) in Mount Hilong-Hilong, 17 miles (27 km) along the eastern portion of Cabadbaran. The southern portion of this range is broader and even more rugged than the northern section. In Davao Oriental, the highest peak is Mount Pandadagsaan (2,670 m (8,760 ft)).

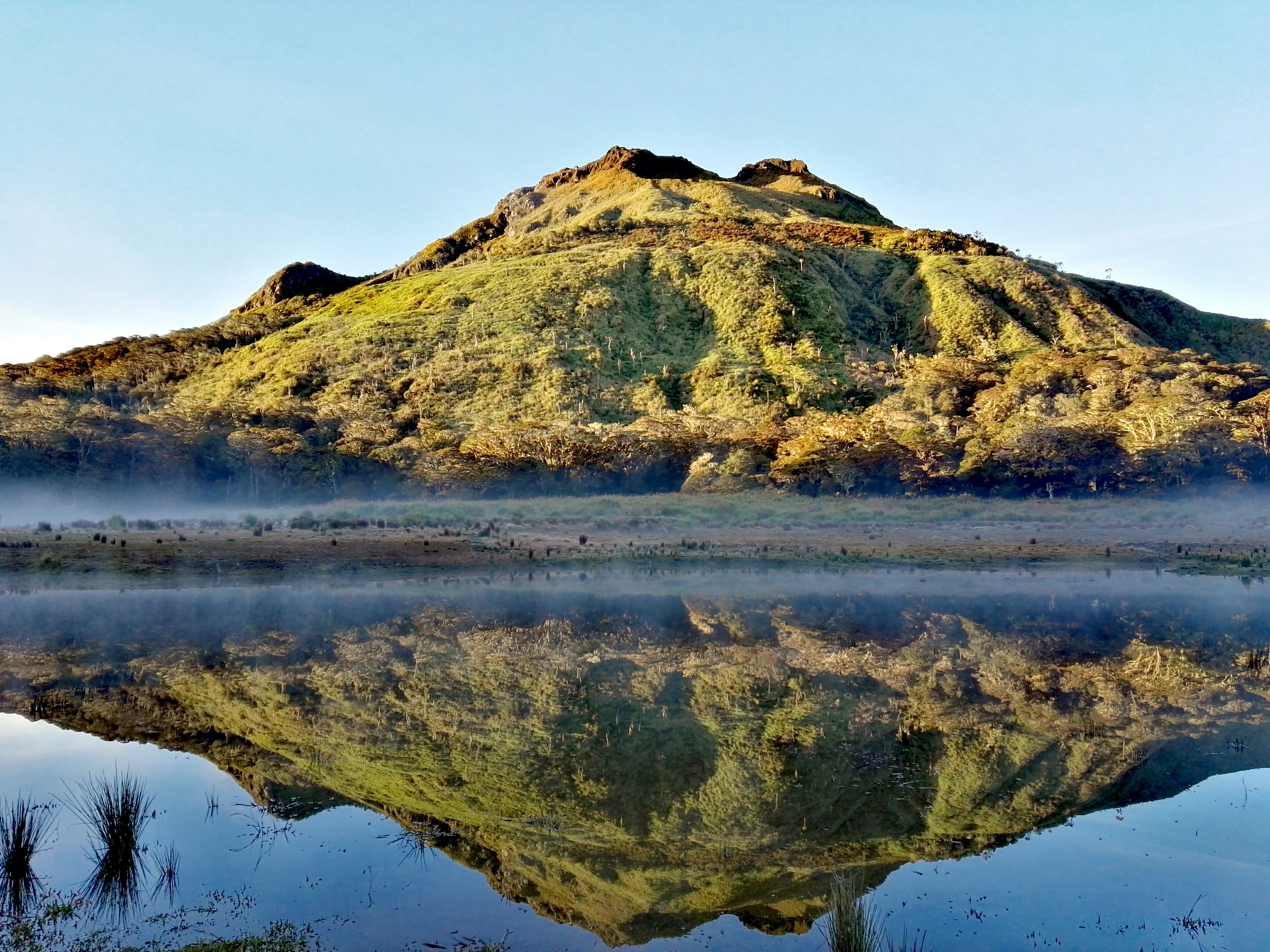
Mt. Apo, the highest peak in the Philippines

The east-facing coastal regions of Davao and Surigao del Sur are marked by a series of small coastal lowlands separated from each other by rugged forelands which extend to the water's edge. Offshore are numerous coral reefs and tiny islets. This remote and forbidding coast is made doubly difficult to access during the months from October to March by heavy surf driven before the northeast trade winds. A few miles offshore is found the Philippine Deep. This ocean trench, reaching measured depths of 34,696 feet (10,575 m), is the third-deepest trench, (after the Mariana Trench and Tonga Trench) on the earth's surface.

A second north–south mountain range extends from Talisayan in the north, to Tinaca Point in the southernmost point of Mindanao. This mountain range runs along the western borders of the Agusan del Norte, Agusan del Sur, and Davao provinces. This range is mainly structural in origin, but it also contains at least three active volcano peaks. The central and northern portions of this range contain several peaks between 2,000 and 2,600 m (6,600 and 8,500 ft), and here the belt of mountains is about 30 miles (48 km) across.

West of Davao City stand two inactive volcanoes: Mount Talomo at 2,674 meters (8,773 ft), and Mount Apo at 2,964 m (9,724 ft). Mount Apo is the highest point in the Philippines. South of Mount Apo, this central mountain belt is somewhat lower than it is to the north, with peaks averaging only 1,100 to 1,800 m (3,600 to 5,900 ft).

In Western Mindanao, a range of complex structural mountains form the long, hand-like Zamboanga Peninsula. These mountains, reaching heights of only 1,200 meters (3,900 feet), are not as high as the other structural belts in Mindanao. There are several places in the Zamboanga Mountains where small inter-mountain basins have been created, with some potential for future agricultural development. The northeastern end of this range is marked by the twin peaks of the highest mountain in the Zamboanga Peninsula, the now-extinct volcano Mount Malindang, that towers over Ozamiz at a height of 2,425 m (7,956 ft). Batorampon Point is the highest mountain at the southernmost end of the peninsula, reaching a height of only 1,335 m (4,380 ft); it is located in the boundary of Zamboanga City.

A series of volcanic mountains is located within the vicinity of Lake Lanao forming a broad arc through the Lanao del Sur, Cotabato and Bukidnon provinces. At least six of the twenty odd peaks in this area are active and several stand in semi-isolation. The Butig Peaks, with their four crater lakes, are easily seen from Cotabato. Mount Ragang, an active volcano cone reaching 2,815 m (9,236 ft), is the most isolated, while the greatest height is reached by Mount Kitanglad at 2,889 m (9,478 ft).

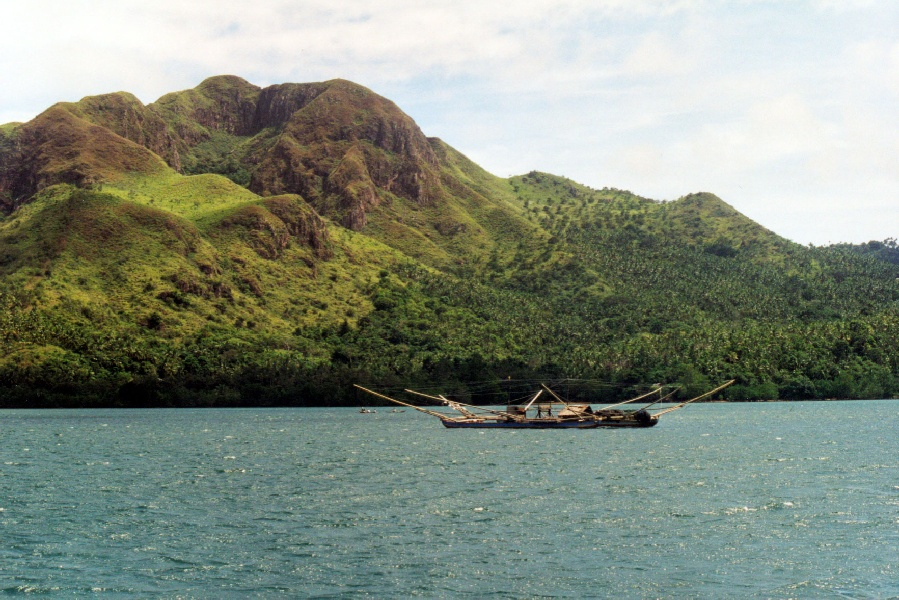
Mindanao coast

In South Cotabato, is another range of volcanic mountains, this time paralleling the coast. These mountains have a maximum extent of 110 miles (180 km) from northwest to southeast and measure some 30 miles (48 km) across. One of the well-known mountains here is Mount Parker, whose almost circular crater lake measures a mile-and-a-quarter in diameter and lies 300 m (980 ft) below its 2,040 m (6,690 ft) summit. Mount Matutum is a protected area and is considered one of the major landmarks in the South Cotabato province.

=== Plateaus ===
Another important physiographic division of Mindanao is the series of upland plateaus in the Bukidnon and Lanao del Sur provinces. These plateaus are rather extensive and almost surround several volcanoes in this area. The plateaus are made up of basaltic lava flows inter-bedded with volcanic ash and tuff. Near their edges, the plateaus are cut by deep canyons, and at several points waterfalls drop down to the narrow coastal plain. These falls hold considerable promise for the development of hydroelectric energy. Indeed, one such site at Maria Cristina Falls has already become a major producer. The rolling plateaus lie at an elevation averaging 700 meters above sea level, and offer relief from the often oppressive heat of the coastal lowlands.

=== Lakes and waterfalls ===
Lake Lanao occupies a large portion of one such plateau in Lanao del Sur. The lake is the largest in Mindanao and the second largest in the Philippines. Roughly triangular in shape, it lies at an elevation of about 780 metres (2,560 ft) above sea level and is surrounded by mountains that rise to more than 2,300 metres (7,500 ft).

Another of Mindanao's waterfall sites is located in Malabang, 15 miles (24 km) south of Lake Lanao. Here the Jose Abad Santos Falls are present at the gateway to a 200-hectare national park development.

The Limunsudan Falls, with an approximate height of 800 ft (240 m), is the highest waterfall in the Philippines; it is located in Iligan City.

=== Valleys, rivers, and plains ===
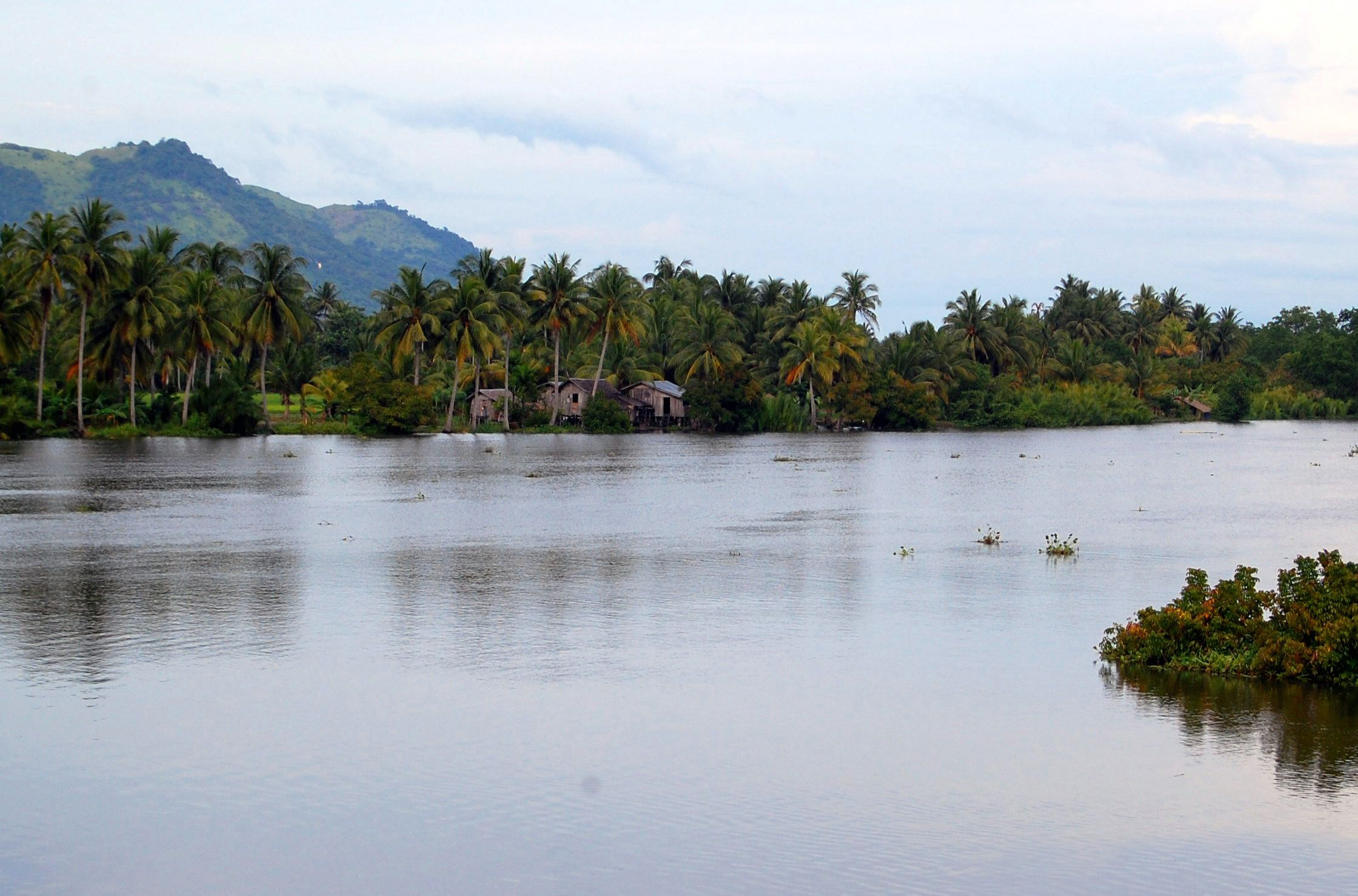
Rio Grande de Mindanao

Mindanao contains two large lowland areas in the valleys of the Agusan River in Agusan, and the Rio Grande de Mindanao in Cotabato City.

There is some indication that the Agusan Valley occupies a broad syncline between the central mountains and the east-coast mountains. This valley measures 110 miles (180 km) from south to north and varies from 20 to 30 miles (32 to 48 km) in width. 35 miles (56 km) north of the head of Davao Gulf lies the watershed between the Agusan and the tributaries of the Libuganon River, which flows to the gulf. The elevation of this divide is well under 200 m (660 ft), indicating the almost continuous nature of the lowland from the Mindanao Sea on the north to Davao Gulf.

The Rio Grande de Mindanao and its main tributaries, the Catisan and the Pulangi, form a valley with a maximum length of 120 miles (190 km) and a width which varies from 12 miles (19 km) at the river mouth to about 60 miles (97 km) in central Cotabato. The southern extensions of this Cotabato Valley extend uninterrupted across a 350-meter (1,150 ft) watershed from Illana Bay on the northwest to Sarangani Bay on the southeast.

Other lowlands of a coastal nature are to be found in various parts of Mindanao. Many of these are tiny isolated pockets, along the northwest coast of Zamboanga. In other areas such as the Davao Plain, these coastal lowlands are 16 km (9.9 mi) wide and several times in length.

From Dipolog, eastward along the northern coast of Mindanao approaching Butuan, extends a rolling coastal plain of varying width. In Misamis Occidental, the now dormant Mount Malindang has created a lowland averaging 13 km (8.1 mi) in width. Shallow Panguil Bay divides this province from Lanao del Norte, and is bordered by low-lying, poorly drained lowlands and extensive mangroves. In Misamis Oriental, the plain is narrower and in places whittles into rugged capes that reach the sea. East of Cagayan de Oro, a rugged peninsula extends into the Mindanao Sea.

=== Climate change ===
Climate change is expected to have adverse effects on Mindanao's population, environment, and agriculture. Mindanao is already experiencing severe climate events attributed to changes in the Earth's temperature. These climate events include typhoons such as Typhoon Washi, Typhoon Bopha and Typhoon Rai as of December 2021. Those storms had a severe impact on the island of Mindanao.

== Demographics ==
In 2017, Mindanao had a population of over 25 million. This represented 22 percent of the entire population of the country.

=== Ethnicity and culture ===
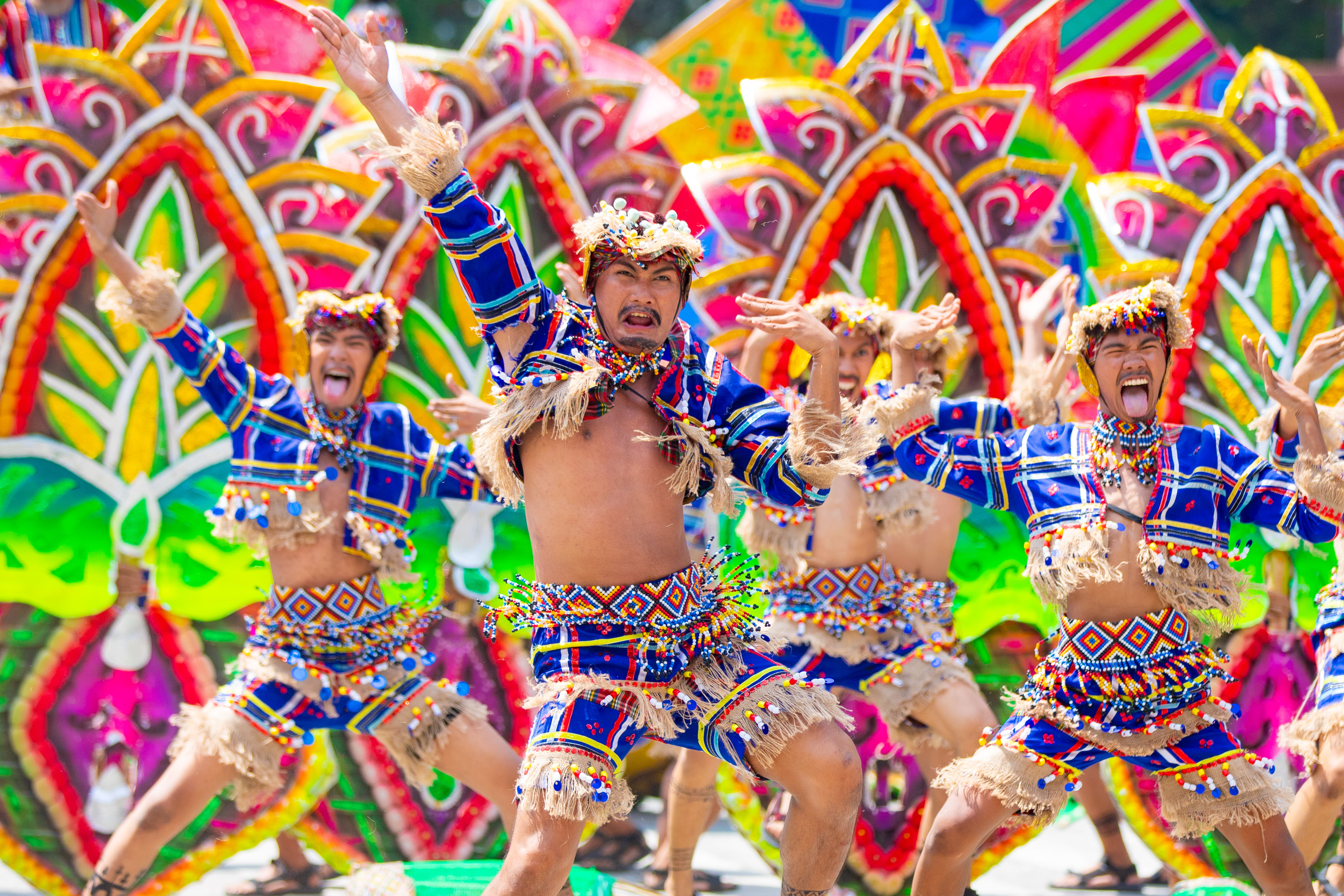
I-indak sa kadalanan or the street dancing competition, part of Kadayawan Festival celebration in Davao City

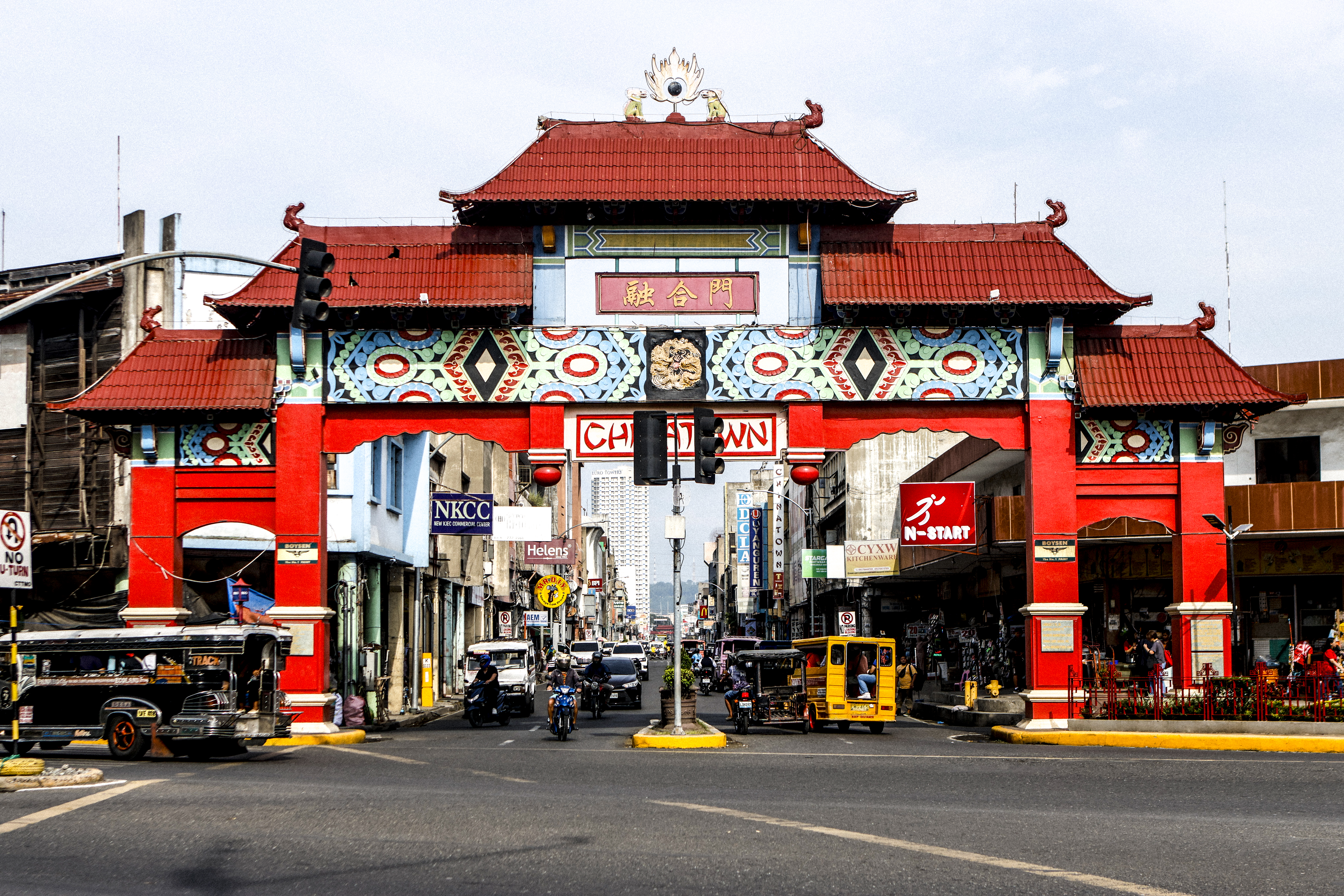
Davao City's Chinatown

Region	Province	Major ethnic groups	
Region	Province	Indigenous	Non-indigenous
Zamboanga Peninsula	Sulu	Sama-Bajaw, Tausug	Cebuano, Chavacano
Zamboanga Peninsula	Zamboanga del Sur	Iranun, Maguindanaon, Maranao, Sama-Bajaw, Subanen, Tausug, Yakan	Bicolano, Cebuano, Chavacano, Chinese, Hiligaynon, Ilocano, Kapampangan, Tagalog
Zamboanga Peninsula	Zamboanga Sibugay	Maguindanaon, Subanen, Tausug	Chavacano, Cebuano, Ilocano
Zamboanga Peninsula	Zamboanga del Norte	Maguindanaon, Sama-Bajaw, Subanen, Tausug	Chavacano, Cebuano
Northern Mindanao	Misamis Occidental	Subanen	Cebuano
Northern Mindanao	Lanao del Norte	Higaonon, Maranao, Subanen	
Northern Mindanao	Misamis Oriental	Higaonon, Maranao	Bicolano, Cebuano, Chinese, Hiligaynon, Ilocano, Indian, Kapampangan, Tagalog
Northern Mindanao	Camiguin	Kamigin Manobo	
Northern Mindanao	Bukidnon	Higaonon, Iranun, Maguindanaon, Maranao, Matigsalug, Talaandig	
Davao Region	Davao del Sur	Ata Manobo, Bagobo Klata, Bagobo Tagabawa, Iranun, Kagan, Maguindanaon, Maranao, Matigsalug, Obu Manuvu, Sama-Bajaw, Tausug	Cebuano, Chinese, Hiligaynon, Ilocano, Indian, Kapampangan, Tagalog
Davao Region	Davao del Norte	Ata, Dibabawon, Kagan, Maguindanaon, Mandaya, Mangguangan, Mansaka, Sama-Bajaw	Bicolano, Cebuano, Hiligaynon, Ilocano, Tagalog
Davao Region	Davao de Oro	Ata Manobo, Dibabawon, Kagan, Mandaya, Mangguangan, Mansaka	Bicolano, Cebuano, Hiligaynon, Ilocano, Tagalog
Davao Region	Davao Oriental	Manobo, Kagan, Mandaya, Mansaka	Cebuano, Hiligaynon, Ilocano, Tagalog
Davao Region	Davao Occidental	Blaan, Tagakaulo, Manobo, Sangil	Cebuano, Hiligaynon, Ilocano, Tagalog
Soccsksargen	Cotabato	Bagobo Tagabawa, Iranun, Maguindanaon, Manobo, Tagakaulo	Bicolano, Cebuano, Hiligaynon, Ilocano, Karay-a, Tagalog, Waray
Soccsksargen	Sarangani	Blaan, Maguindanaon, Tagakaulo, Tboli	Cebuano, Hiligaynon, Ilocano, Tagalog, Waray
Soccsksargen	South Cotabato	Blaan, Maguindanaon, Tboli	Bicolano, Cebuano, Hiligaynon, Ilocano, Karay-a, Kapampangan, Tagalog, Waray
Soccsksargen	Sultan Kudarat	Blaan, Maguindanaon, Manobo, Teduray	Cebuano, Hiligaynon, Ilocano, Karay-a, Kapampangan, Tagalog
BARMM	Maguindanao del Norte	Iranun, Maguindanaon, Teduray	Cebuano, Hiligaynon, Ilocano, Tagalog
BARMM	Maguindanao del Sur	Ilianen Manobo, Maguindanaon, Teduray	Hiligaynon, Ilocano, Karay-a, Tagalog
BARMM	Lanao del Sur	Iranun, Maranao	Bicolano, Cebuano, Hiligaynon, Ilocano, Tagalog
BARMM	Basilan	Sama-Bajaw, Tausug, Yakan	Chavacano, Cebuano, Hiligaynon, Ilocano
BARMM	Tawi-tawi	Sama-Bajaw, Tausug	Cebuano
Caraga	Agusan del Norte	Agusan Manobo, Higaonon, Mamanwa	Butuanon, Cebuano, Hiligaynon, Ilocano, Surigaonon, Tagalog
Caraga	Agusan del Sur	Bagobo, Agusan Manobo, Higaonon, Mamanwa	Bicolano, Butuanon, Cebuano, Hiligaynon, Ilocano, Surigaonon, Tagalog
Caraga	Surigao del Norte	Mandaya, Agusan Manobo, Mamanwa, Mansaka	Bicolano, Cebuano, Hiligaynon, Ilocano, Surigaonon, Tagalog, Waray
Caraga	Surigao del Sur	Mandaya, Agusan Manobo	Bicolano, Cebuano, Hiligaynon, Ilocano, Surigaonon, Tagalog, Waray
Caraga	Dinagat Islands		Cebuano, Hiligaynon, Ilocano, Surigaonon, Tagalog, Waray

An American census conducted in the early 1900s noted that the island was inhabited by people "greatly divided in origin, temperament and religion". Evidence of the island's cultural diversity can be seen in the buildings and ruins of old Spanish settlements in the northwestern peninsula that span eastwards to the southern gulf coast, the site of the ancient Rajahnate of Butuan in the northeast region (Caraga), the sultanates in the southwest (Sultanate of Sulu, Sultanate of Lanao, Sultanate of Maguindanao), a number of Buddhist and Taoist temples, and the numerous indigenous tribes.

Today around 25.8 percent of the household population in Mindanao classified themselves as Cebuanos. Other ethnic groups included Bisaya/Binisaya (18.4%), Hiligaynon/Ilonggo (8.2%), Maguindanaon (5.5%), and Maranao (5.4%). The remaining 36.6 percent belonged to other ethnic groups, including individuals from Luzon and the Lumad people (indigenous peoples of Mindanao). Cebuano registered the highest proportion of ethnic groups in Northern Mindanao and Davao Region with 35.59 percent and 37.76 percent, respectively. In Soccsksargen, it was Hiligaynon/Ilonggo (31.58%), Binisaya/Bisaya (33.10%) in Zamboanga Peninsula, Maranao (26.40%) in BARMM, and Surigaonon (25.67%) in Caraga.

Like elsewhere, assimilation from one ethnic group into another is not uncommon in Mindanao. Over the last decades, many Christian migrants from Luzon and Lumad tribes on the island integrated and assimilated into the majority Cebuano-speaking society in Mindanao (Hiligaynon-speaking in the case of Soccsksargen). They identified themselves as Visayans as a result of learning to speak Cebuano or Hiligaynon fluently from their Cebuano or Hiligaynon neighbors. Despite this, many of them still know and retain their non-Visayan roots and some speak their ancestors' language fluently as their second or third language since Mindanao is a melting pot of cultures as a result of southward migration from Luzon and Visayas since the 20th century. Descendants of these migrant Luzon ethnic groups and Lumads, especially newer generations (as Mindanao-born natives), now speak Cebuano or Hiligaynon fluently as their main language with little or no knowledge of their ancestors' native tongues at the time of their southward journey to Mindanao and Lumads developed contact with Cebuano and Hiligaynon speakers. Because the island's inhabitants converted to Christianity and assimilated into the Christian communities, it cannot be always determined whether or not the residents were of indigenous Mindanaoan heritage.

=== Languages ===
Dozens of languages are spoken in Mindanao; among them, Cebuano, Hiligaynon, Maguindanaon, Maranao, Surigaonon, Tausug, and Chavacano are most widely spoken. Of the seven aforementioned regional languages, Cebuano (often referred to as Bisaya) has the largest number of speakers, being spoken throughout Northern Mindanao (except the southern parts of Lanao del Norte), the Davao region, the western half of the Caraga region (as well as the city of Bislig and the municipalities surrounding it in Surigao del Sur), the entirety of the Zamboanga Peninsula (with the exception of Zamboanga City), and southern Soccsksargen.

Hiligaynon is the main language of Soccsksargen, where majority of the inhabitants are of ethnic Hiligaynon stock. Maguindanaon, Manobo, Tboli and Blaan are the indigenous languages spoken in Soccsksargen. Ilocano, a native language of the Luzon ethnic group of the same name, is also spoken in some areas in Soccsksargen, where they also share residency with Hiligaynons. Surigaonon is spoken in the eastern half of the Caraga region, mainly by the eponymous Surigaonons. Tausug is widely spoken specifically in the Sulu Archipelago, which comprises the provinces of Basilan, Sulu, and Tawi-Tawi, with a community of speakers residing in Zamboanga City.

Maranao and Maguindanaon are the dominant languages of the eastern territories of the Bangsamoro, respectively, with the former being spoken in Lanao del Sur as well as the southern areas of Lanao del Norte, and the latter in the eponymous provinces of Maguindanao del Norte and Maguindanao del Sur and also in adjacent areas which are part of Soccsksargen. The Maguindanaoan language of the subsumed Sultanate of Maguindanao has absorbed a large quantity of vocabulary from the Arabic language. It is the same case with the Maranao language of the Confederate States of Lanao

Chavacano, which is a Creole language of Mexican-Spanish, is the native language of Zamboanga City, former capital of the Republic of Zamboanga and is also the lingua franca of Basilan; it is also spoken in the southernmost fringes of Zamboanga Sibugay. It is also spoken, albeit as a minority language, in Cotabato City and Davao City, where dialects of it, respectively, exist, namely Cotabateño and Castellano Abakay, both of which evolved from the variant of the language spoken in Zamboanga City.

English and Filipino are also widely understood and spoken, with the former being highly utilized in business and academia, and the latter being used to communicate with visitors from Luzon and other parts of Visayas. Filipino is also the main lingua franca of Cotabato City and in BARMM as a whole.

=== Religion ===
Religion in Mindanao (2020)
1. Catholicism (41.0%)
2. Islam (23.4%)
3. Pentecostal (5.34%)
4. Iglesia ni Cristo (5.40%)
5. Aglipayan (2.16%)
6. Other/Unknown Christians (11.3%)
7. Other/None (4.60%)

Christianity is the dominant religious affiliation in Mindanao with 43% of the household population, the majority of which are adherents of Catholicism; Islam comprised 23.39%, and other religions were Pentecostal (5.34%), Aglipayan (2.16%), and Iglesia ni Cristo (5.2%).

== Tourism ==
Major tourist spots are scattered throughout Mindanao, consisting mostly of beach resorts, scuba diving resorts, surfing, museums, nature parks, mountain climbing, and river rafting. Siargao, best known for its surfing tower in Cloud 9, also has caves, pools, waterfalls, and lagoons. There are archaeological sites, historical ruins, and museums in Butuan. White Island is a popular tourist spot in Camiguin. The Duka Bay and the Matangale dive resorts in Misamis Oriental offer glass bottomed boat rides and scuba diving lessons. Cagayan de Oro has beach resorts, the Mapawa Nature Park, white water rafting and kayaking, museums, and historical landmarks. Ziplining is the main attraction at the Dahilayan Adventure Park and rock wall climbing at Kiokong in Bukidnon. Iligan City has the Maria Cristina Falls, Tinago Falls, nature parks, beaches, and historical landmarks. There are parks, historical buildings, the Vinta Ride at Paseo del Mar, boat villages, 11 Islands (commonly called as Onçe Islas), 17th-century Fort Pilar Shrine and Museum and the world-renowned Pink Sand Beach of Sta. Cruz in Zamboanga City. There are festivals, fireworks, and the Beras Bird Sanctuary in Takurong City. Davao has Mt Apo, parks, museums, beaches, historical landmarks, and scuba diving resorts.

== Energy ==
Many areas in Mindanao suffer rotating 12-hour blackouts due to the island's woefully inadequate power supply. The island is forecast to continue suffering from a 200-megawatt power deficit until 2015, when the private sector begins to operate new capacity. Aboitiz Equity Ventures, a publicly listed holding company, has committed to supplying 1,200 megawatts through a coal-fired plant on the border of Davao City and Davao del Sur that is slated for operation by 2018. The Agus-Pulangui hydropower complex, which supplies more than half of Mindanao's power supply, is currently producing only 635 megawatts of its 982 megawatt capacity due to the heavy siltation of the rivers that power the complex. Zamboanga City, an urbanized center in southwest Mindanao, is expected to begin experiencing daily three-hour brownouts due to the National Power Corporation's decision to reduce power supply in the city by 10 megawatts.

The Manila Electric Company (Meralco), the largest power distributor in the Philippines, and Global Business Power Corp (GBPC), also a major provider, have announced plans to enter Mindanao for the first time to establish solutions for the power problems within the island.

== Major annual events ==
- Mindanao Film Festival (Established in 2003)
- Kadayawan Festival
- Kaamulan Festival
- Higalaay Festival (formerly known as Kagay-an Festival and Higalaay Kagay-an Festival)
- Christmas Symbols Festival
- Bangsamoro Short Film Festival
- Shariff Kabunsuan Festival (Cotabato City, Maguindanao del Norte)
- Timpuyog Festival (Kiamba, Sarangani)
- Timpuyog Festival (Lambayong, Sultan Kudarat)
- Halad Festival
- P'gsalabuk Festival
- Kinabayo Festival

== See also ==
- Geography of the Philippines
- Island groups of the Philippines
- List of islands in the Philippines
- Mindanao montane rain forests
- Luzon
- Visayas
