= Regional development council =

Philippine regional government agency

Regional development councils (RDCs) are the highest policy-making bodies in the administrative regions of the Philippines. They serve as the subnational counterparts of the Economy and Development Council. Regional development councils exist in all but two of the Philippines' 18 regions: Metro Manila and Bangsamoro. Metro Manila has a metropolitan body that performs the same functions as an RDC, while Bangsamoro, an autonomous region, has its own equivalent institution.

Metro Manila is recognized by law as a "special development and administrative region" and was therefore assigned a metropolitan authority. The Metro Manila Council within the MMDA serves as the National Capital Region's RDC. The defunct Autonomous Region in Muslim Mindanao (ARMM) had the Regional Economic and Development Planning Board as its counterpart to an RDC.

Under the Bangsamoro Organic Law, Bangsamoro is mandated to maintain the Bangsamoro Economic and Development Council (BEDC), which serves as the autonomous region's counterpart to an RDC.

== List ==
=== Regional development councils ===
Location	Region (regional designation)	Regional development council	Official site
Map of the Philippines highlighting Cordillera Region	Cordillera Administrative Region (CAR)	Regional Development Council – Cordillera Administrative Region	Official website
Map of the Philippines highlighting the Ilocos Region	Ilocos Region (Region I)	Regional Development Council – Region 1	Official website
Map of the Philippines highlighting Cagayan Valley	Cagayan Valley (Region II)	Regional Development Council – Region 2	Official website
Map of the Philippines highlighting Central Luzon	Central Luzon (Region III)	Regional Development Council – Region 3	Official website
Map of the Philippines highlighting Calabarzon	Calabarzon (Region IV-A)	Regional Development Council – Calabarzon	Official website
Map of the Philippines highlighting Mimaropa	Mimaropa (Southwestern Tagalog Region) (Note: Formerly designated as Region IV-B until 2016.)	Regional Development Council – Mimaropa	Official website
Map of the Philippines highlighting the Bicol Region	Bicol Region (Region V)	Regional Development Council – Region 5	Official website
Map of the Philippines highlighting Western Visayas	Western Visayas (Region VI)	Regional Development Council – Region 6	Official website
Map of the Philippines highlighting the Negros Island Region	Negros Island Region (NIR)	Regional Development Council – NIR	Official website
Map of the Philippines highlighting Central Visayas	Central Visayas (Region VII)	Regional Development Council – Region 7	Official website
Map of the Philippines highlighting Eastern Visayas	Eastern Visayas (Region VIII)	Regional Development Council – Region 8	Official website
Map of the Philippines highlighting Zamboanga Peninsula	Zamboanga Peninsula (Region IX)	Regional Development Council – Region 9	Official website
Map of the Philippines highlighting Northern Mindanao	Northern Mindanao (Region X)	Regional Development Council – Region 10	Official website
Map of the Philippines highlighting the Davao Region	Davao Region (Region XI)	Regional Development Council – Region 11	Official website
Map of the Philippines highlighting Soccsksargen	Soccsksargen (Region XII)	Regional Development Council – Region 12	Official website
Map of the Philippines highlighting Caraga	Caraga (Region XIII)	Regional Development Council – Region 13	Official website

=== RDC-equivalent body in other regions ===
Location	Region (regional designation)	RDC-equivalent body	Official site
Map of the Philippines highlighting the National Capital Region	National Capital Region (NCR)	Metro Manila Council (MMC)	Official website
Map of the Philippines highlighting the Bangsamoro Autonomous Region in Muslim Mindanao	Bangsamoro (BARMM)	Bangsamoro Economic and Development Council (BEDC)	Official website
