= Batorampon Point =

Batorampon Point Batalampon Point
- Headland
- Interactive map of Batorampon Point
- Coordinates: 7°6′32.5″N 121°53′51.8″E
- Location: Labuan, IX, Philippines

Batorampon Point

Highest point
- Elevation: 1,335 m (4,380 ft)
- Coordinates: 7°4′25″N 122°1′23.3″E

Geography
- Location: Zamboanga City, Philippines
- Parent range: Zamboanga Cordillera, Mindanao Island

Batorampon Point is the westernmost point of the island of Mindanao (7°6′32.5″N 121°53′51.8″E) in the Philippines and has been named so since the mid-19th century. The rocky cliff, located within the limits of the City of Zamboanga, was previously known as Batalampon Point, becoming Batorampon Point in the 1940s. The point is located just north of Labuan, about 35 kilometres (22 mi) from downtown Zamboanga City.

Batorampon Point is also the alleged name of the highest elevation in Zamboanga City located in 7°4′25″N 122°1′23.3″E. The peak was not named in the 1940s topography map of the region by the U.S. Army's topographic engineering agency, the Army Map Service. When it was named Batorampon Point is not known.
