= List of primary local government units of the Philippines =

Below is a full list of primary-level subdivisions of local government in the Philippines. As of June 11, 2024, there are 82 provinces ( province ), 34 highly urbanized cities ( HUC ), 4 independent component cities ( ICC ), and one independent municipality ( NCR municipality ). All 121 primary-level LGUs (local government units) are under general administrative supervision of the President of the Philippines.

Map showing the primary local government units of the Philippines and the regions they are grouped into.

Primary-level LGU	Type	Region	Population (2020)	Population (2015)	Area (km^{2})	Density (/km^{2}, 2015)
Abra	province	CAR	250,985	241,160	4,165.25	58
Agusan del Norte	province	XIII	387,503	354,503	2,730.24	130
Agusan del Sur	province	XIII	739,367	700,653	9,989.52	70
Aklan	province	VI	615,475	574,823	1,821.42	316
Albay	province	V	1,374,768	1,314,826	2,575.77	510
Angeles City	HUC	III	462,928	411,634	60.27	6,830
Antique	province	VI	612,974	582,012	2,729.17	213
Apayao	province	CAR	124,366	119,184	4,413.35	27
Aurora	province	III	235,750	214,336	3,147.32	68
Bacolod	HUC	NIR	600,783	561,875	162.67	3,454
Baguio	HUC	CAR	366,358	345,366	57.51	6,005
Basilan	province	BARMM	556,586	459,367	1,327.23	346
Bataan	province	III	853,373	760,650	1,372.98	554
Batanes	province	II	18,831	17,246	219.01	79
Batangas	province	IV-A	2,908,494	2,694,335	3,119.75	864
Benguet	province	CAR	460,683	446,224	2,769.08	161
Biliran	province	VIII	179,312	171,612	536.01	320
Bohol	province	VII	1,394,329	1,313,560	4,820.95	272
Bukidnon	province	X	1,541,308	1,415,226	10,498.59	135
Bulacan	province	III	3,708,890	3,292,071	2,796.10	1,177
Butuan	HUC	XIII	372,910	337,063	816.62	413
Cagayan	province	II	1,268,603	1,199,320	9,295.75	129
Cagayan de Oro	HUC	X	728,402	675,950	412.80	1,637
Caloocan	HUC	NCR	1,661,584	1,583,978	53.33	29,701
Camarines Norte	province	V	629,699	583,313	2,320.07	251
Camarines Sur	province	V	1,859,074	1,756,541	5,412.55	325
Camiguin	province	X	92,808	88,478	237.95	372
Capiz	province	VI	804,952	761,384	2,594.64	293
Catanduanes	province	V	271,879	260,964	1,492.16	175
Cavite	province	IV-A	4,344,829	3,678,301	1,574.17	2,337
Cebu	province	VII	3,325,385	2,938,982	4,943.72	594
Cebu City	HUC	VII	964,169	922,611	315.00	2,929
Cotabato	province	XII	1,490,618	1,379,747	9,008.90	153
Cotabato City	ICC	BARMM	325,079	299,438	176.00	1,701
Dagupan	ICC	I	174,302	171,271	37.23	4,600
Davao City	HUC	XI	1,776,949	1,632,991	2,443.61	668
Davao de Oro	province	XI	767,547	736,107	4,479.77	164
Davao del Norte	province	XI	1,125,057	1,016,332	3,426.97	297
Davao del Sur	province	XI	680,481	632,588	2,163.98	292
Davao Occidental	province	XI	317,159	316,342	2,163.45	146
Davao Oriental	province	XI	576,343	558,958	5,679.64	98
Dinagat Islands	province	XIII	128,117	127,152	1,036.34	123
Eastern Samar	province	VIII	477,168	467,160	4,660.47	100
General Santos	HUC	XII	697,315	594,446	492.86	1,206
Guimaras	province	VI	187,842	174,613	604.57	289
Ifugao	province	CAR	207,498	202,802	2,628.21	77
Iligan	HUC	X	363,115	342,618	813.37	421
Ilocos Norte	province	I	609,588	593,081	3,467.89	171
Ilocos Sur	province	I	706,009	689,668	2,596.00	266
Iloilo	province	VI	2,051,899	1,936,423	5,000.83	387
Iloilo City	HUC	VI	457,626	447,992	78.34	5,719
Isabela	province	II	1,548,470	1,458,736	12,159.43	120
Kalinga	province	CAR	229,570	212,680	3,231.25	66
La Union	province	I	822,352	786,653	1,497.70	525
Laguna	province	IV-A	3,382,193	3,035,081	1,917.85	1,583
Lanao del Norte	province	X	722,902	676,395	3,346.57	202
Lanao del Sur	province	BARMM	1,195,518	1,045,429	3,872.89	270
Lapu-Lapu	HUC	VII	497,604	408,112	58.10	7,024
Las Piñas	HUC	NCR	606,293	588,894	32.69	18,014
Leyte	province	VIII	1,545,849	1,509,648	5,699.73	265
Lucena	HUC	IV-A	278,924	266,248	80.21	3,319
Maguindanao del Norte	province	BARMM	926,037	-	3,988.82	232
Maguindanao del Sur	province	BARMM	741,221	-	4,973.48	149
Makati	HUC	NCR	629,616	582,602	21.57	27,010
Malabon	HUC	NCR	380,522	365,525	15.71	23,267
Mandaluyong	HUC	NCR	425,758	386,276	9.29	41,580
Mandaue	HUC	VII	364,116	362,654	25.18	14,402
Manila	HUC	NCR	1,846,513	1,780,148	42.88	41,515
Marikina	HUC	NCR	456,059	450,741	21.52	20,945
Marinduque	province	Mimaropa	239,207	234,521	952.58	246
Masbate	province	V	908,920	892,393	4,151.78	215
Misamis Occidental	province	X	617,333	602,126	2,055.22	293
Misamis Oriental	province	X	956,900	888,509	3,131.52	284
Mountain Province	province	CAR	158,200	154,590	2,157.38	72
Muntinlupa	HUC	NCR	543,445	504,509	39.75	12,692
Naga	HUC	V	209,170	196,003	84.48	2,320
Navotas	HUC	NCR	247,543	249,463	8.94	27,904
Negros Occidental	province	NIR	2,623,172	2,497,261	7,802.54	320
Negros Oriental	province	NIR	1,432,990	1,354,995	5,385.53	252
Northern Samar	province	VIII	639,186	632,379	3,692.93	171
Nueva Ecija	province	III	2,310,134	2,151,461	5,751.33	374
Nueva Vizcaya	province	II	497,432	452,287	3,975.67	114
Occidental Mindoro	province	Mimaropa	525,354	487,414	5,865.71	83
Olongapo	HUC	III	260,317	233,040	185.00	1,260
Oriental Mindoro	province	Mimaropa	908,339	844,059	4,238.38	199
Ormoc	ICC	VIII	230,998	215,031	613.60	350
Palawan	province	Mimaropa	939,594	849,469	14,649.73	58
Pampanga	province	III	2,437,709	2,198,110	2,002.20	1,098
Pangasinan	province	I	2,988,888	2,785,455	5,413.78	515
Parañaque	HUC	NCR	689,992	665,822	46.57	14,297
Pasay	HUC	NCR	440,656	416,522	13.97	29,815
Pasig	HUC	NCR	803,159	755,300	48.46	15,586
Pateros	NCR municipality	NCR	65,227	63,840	2.25	28,373
Puerto Princesa	HUC	Mimaropa	307,079	255,116	2,381.02	107
Quezon	province	IV-A	1,950,459	1,856,582	8,989.39	207
Quezon City	HUC	NCR	2,960,048	2,936,116	171.71	17,099
Quirino	province	II	203,828	188,991	2,323.47	81
Rizal	province	IV-A	3,330,143	2,884,227	1,191.94	2,420
Romblon	province	Mimaropa	308,985	292,781	1,533.45	191
Samar	province	VIII	793,183	780,481	6,048.03	129
San Juan	HUC	NCR	126,347	122,180	5.95	20,569
Santiago	ICC	II	148,580	134,830	255.50	528
Sarangani	province	XII	558,946	544,261	3,601.25	151
Siquijor	province	NIR	103,395	95,984	337.49	284
Sorsogon	province	V	828,655	792,949	2,119.01	374
South Cotabato	province	XII	975,476	915,289	3,935.95	233
Southern Leyte	province	VIII	429,573	421,750	1,798.61	234
Sultan Kudarat	province	XII	854,052	812,095	5,298.34	153
Sulu	province	BARMM	1,000,108	824,731	1,600.40	515
Surigao del Norte	province	XIII	534,636	485,088	1,972.93	246
Surigao del Sur	province	XIII	642,255	592,250	4,932.70	120
Tacloban	HUC	VIII	251,881	242,089	201.72	1,200
Taguig	HUC	NCR	886,722	804,915	45.21	17,804
Tarlac	province	III	1,503,456	1,366,027	3,053.60	447
Tawi-Tawi	province	BARMM	440,276	390,715	1,087.40	359
Valenzuela	HUC	NCR	714,978	620,422	47.02	13,195
Zambales	province	III	649,615	590,848	3,645.83	162
Zamboanga City	HUC	IX	977,234	861,799	1,414.70	609
Zamboanga del Norte	province	IX	1,047,455	1,011,393	7,301.00	139
Zamboanga del Sur	province	IX	1,050,668	1,010,674	4,499.46	225
Zamboanga Sibugay	province	IX	669,840	633,129	3,607.75	175

== See also ==
- List of cities in the Philippines
- List of cities and municipalities in the Philippines
- List of provinces of the Philippines
