= Kadayawan Festival =

Annual festival in Davao City, Philippines

Kadayawan
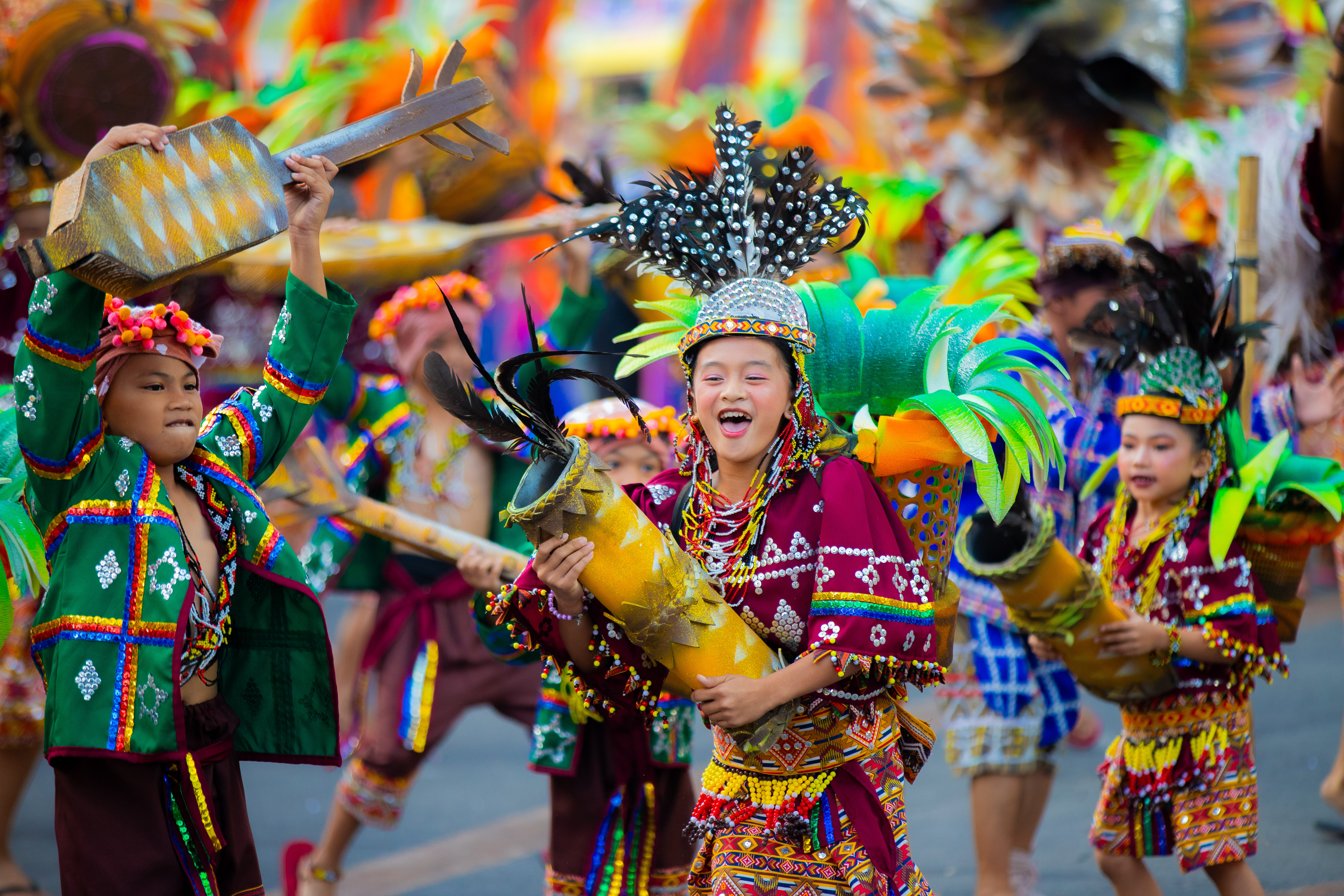
- "Indak-Indak sa Kadayawan", or street dancing competition, part of Kadayawan Festival celebration
- Observed by: Davao City
- Type: Thanksgiving / cultural
- Date: Third week of August
- 2026 date: August 7-16, 2026

The Kadayawan Festival is an annual festival in the city of Davao in the Philippines. The festival is a celebration of life, a thanksgiving for the gifts of nature, the wealth of culture, the bounties of harvest and serenity of living.

The festival was previously known as Apo Duwaling Festival, named after three icons of Davao; Mount Apo, durian, and the waling-waling orchid.

Previously, this festival was held in the third week of August every year which was highlighting the 11 tribes of Davao City. In 2019, the celebration was extended and held from 2 to 31 August. The 2026 edition was celebrated from 7 to 16 August, but the festivities began as early as July and all throughout August.

One of the highlights of the Kadayawan Festival is the Indak-Indak sa Kadayawan, which translates to street dancing. This is a showcase of the diverse indigenous cultures of the region. The festivities feature different communities in Mindanao dancing in vibrant costumes that highlight their indigenous heritage.

== History ==
In 1970, Mayor Elias B. Lopez encouraged all the Davao tribes to showcase their thanksgiving rituals. In 1986, the Davao City government focused on uniting the people in the turbulent times of martial law. At this time the festival was called "Apo Duwaling". This name was created as a combination of three natural wonders: Mount Apo, durian, and waling-waling. Also an important event in Davao that brings together friends and families.

In 1988, the festival was officially named "Kadayawan Festival" by Mayor (now former Philippine President) Rodrigo Duterte.

In 2017, the Kadayawan Village was established in Magsaysay Park. It supposed to serve as a temporary location dedicated to the festival, but it became a popular and regular feature to showcase the culture of Davao's 11 ethnolinguistic tribes. As of 2025, it is currently working to institutionalize the village as a permanent, year-round cultural and tourism destination.

Due to the COVID-19 pandemic, the festival was held digitally in 2020 and 2021. There were plans to celebrate the festival in a hybrid format in 2021, but such plans did not push through due to the rising cases caused by the Delta variant. The festival returned normally the next year, albeit with safety measures. In 2023, the festival made a big change, aiming to promote the festival globally, with a new theme song titled "Kada Kadayawan" performed by Maan Chua and Neil Llanes, and a theme "Colors of Abundance, Vibrance of Diversity, Festival of Festivals". The theme song was remastered the next year.

However, in 2025, the festival is branded as "Kadayawan 2025" instead of "40th Kadayawan" as Kadayawan executive committee Carmelita Bangayan said in the festival's media conference, "They have to go back and check the narratives when Kadayawan actually started." She also added that it will be branded as "Kadayawan 2025" until they found out when the festival actually started. They would then proceed into branding the festival with the current year instead of the numerical order.

The 2026 edition would be one of the most notable editions of the festival, as the Grand Showdown of Indak-Indak sa Kadayawan took place for the first time in Davao City Coastal Road to cater more locals and tourists alike. The city's Public Safety and Security Office recorded a record-breaking 120,000 people watched the Grand Showdown in person—the largest crowd in Kadayawan history. Additionally, the grand prize pot was added from ₱1,000,000 in each category to ₱2,000,000 in Open Category and ₱1,700,000 in the Davao City School-Based Category. The Kadayawan Festival would also be celebrated in Nagoya and Tokyo in Japan, and in Melbourne, Australia organized by various Filipino and Mindanaoan communities.

== Gallery ==
Kadayawan Festival 2026

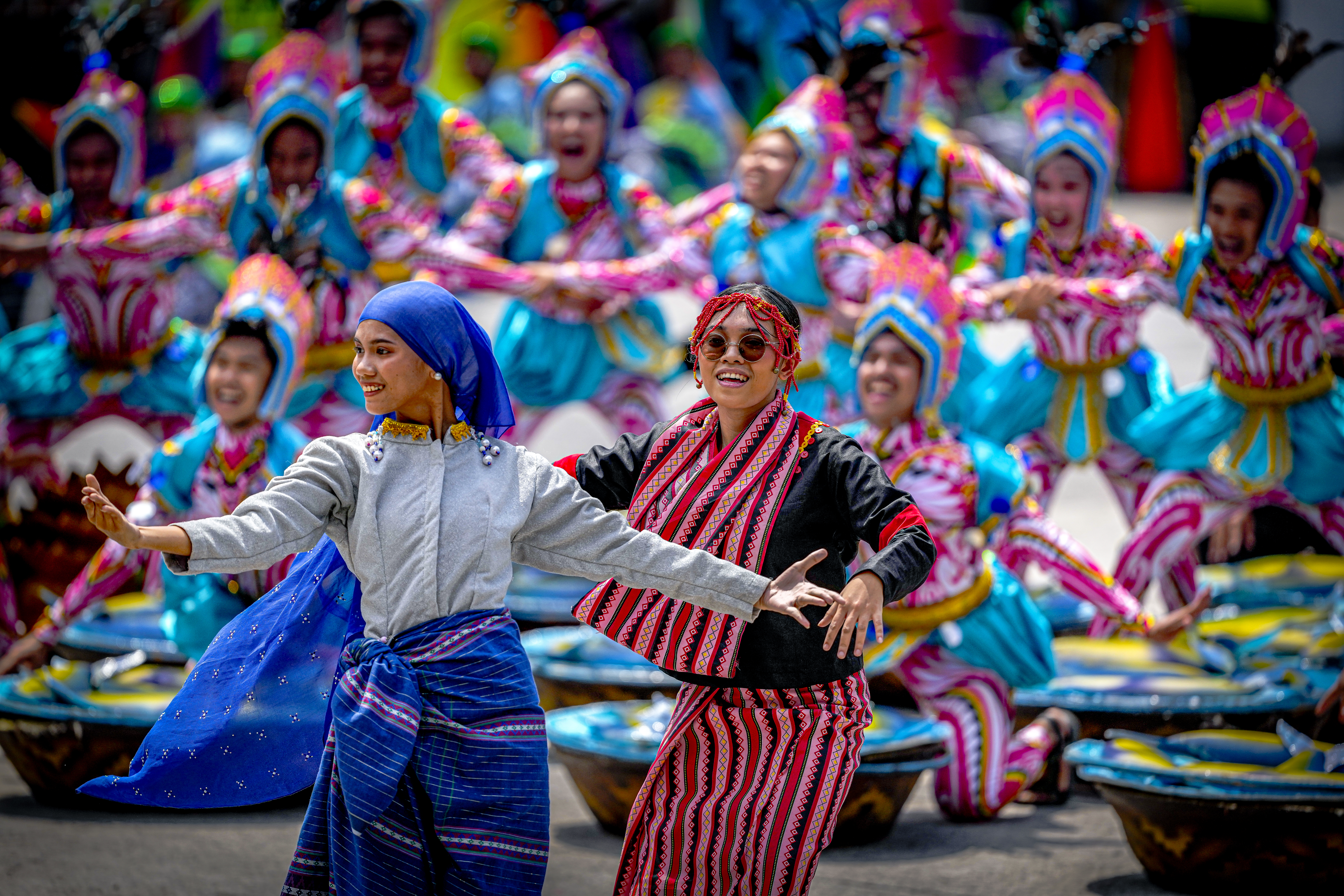

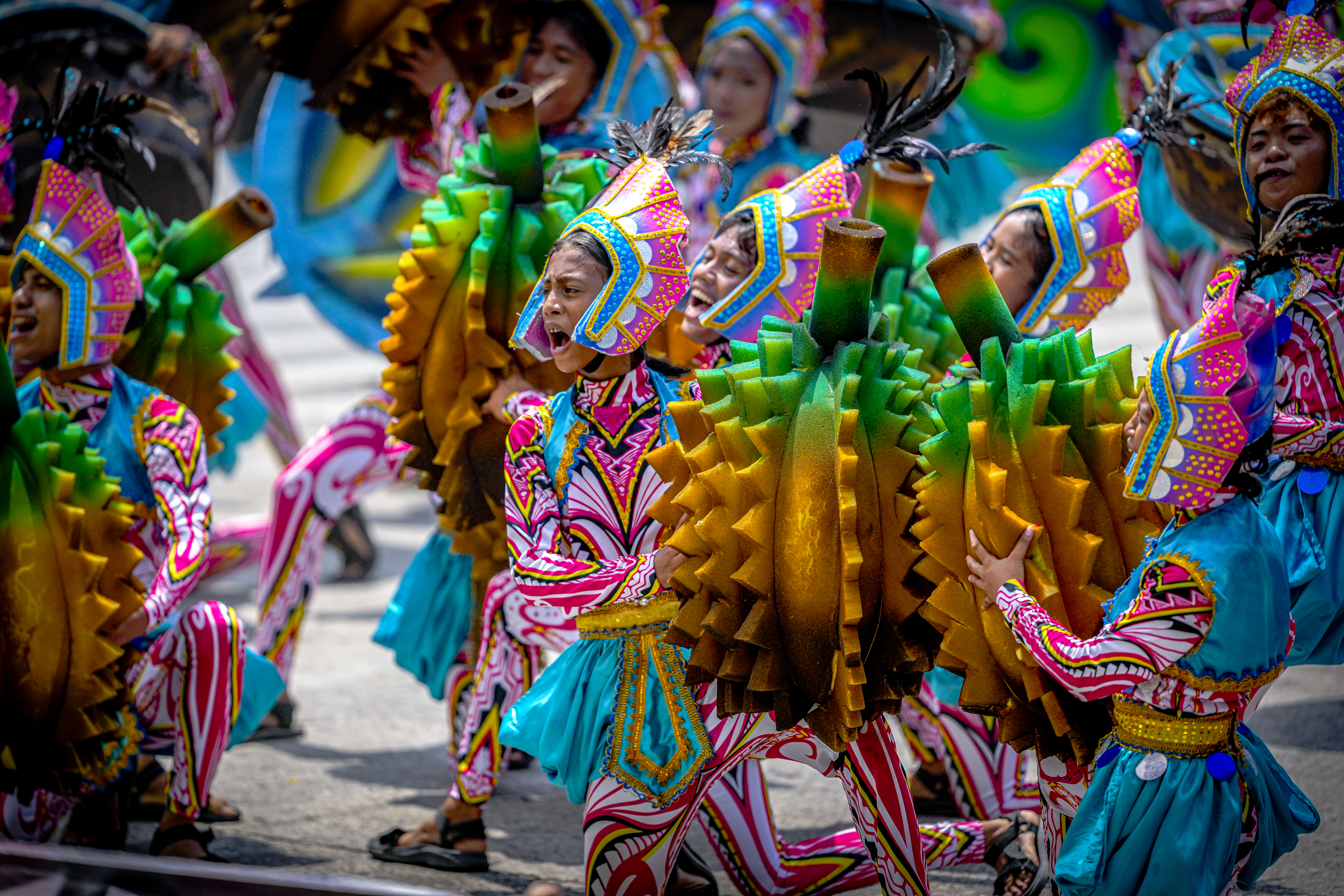

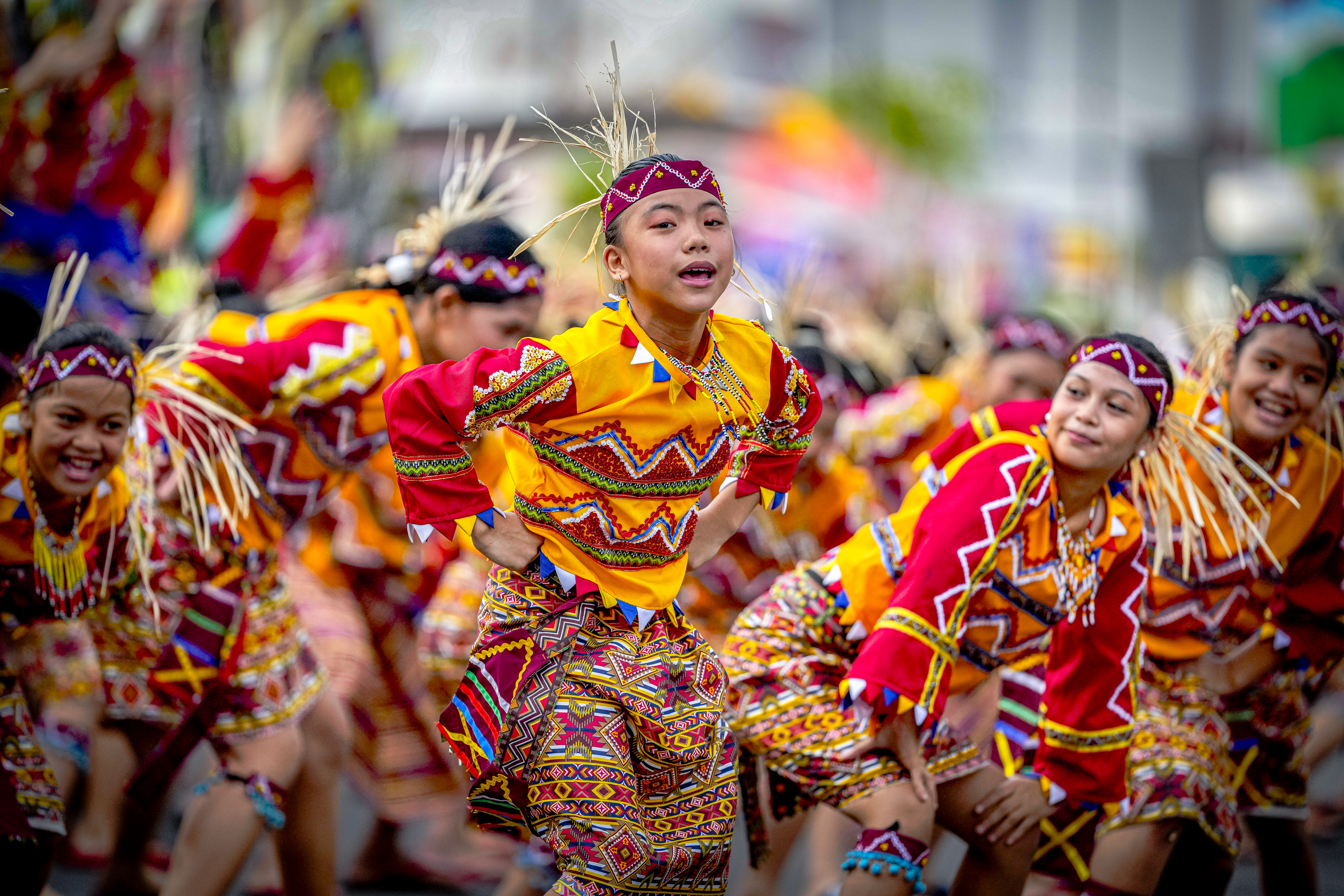

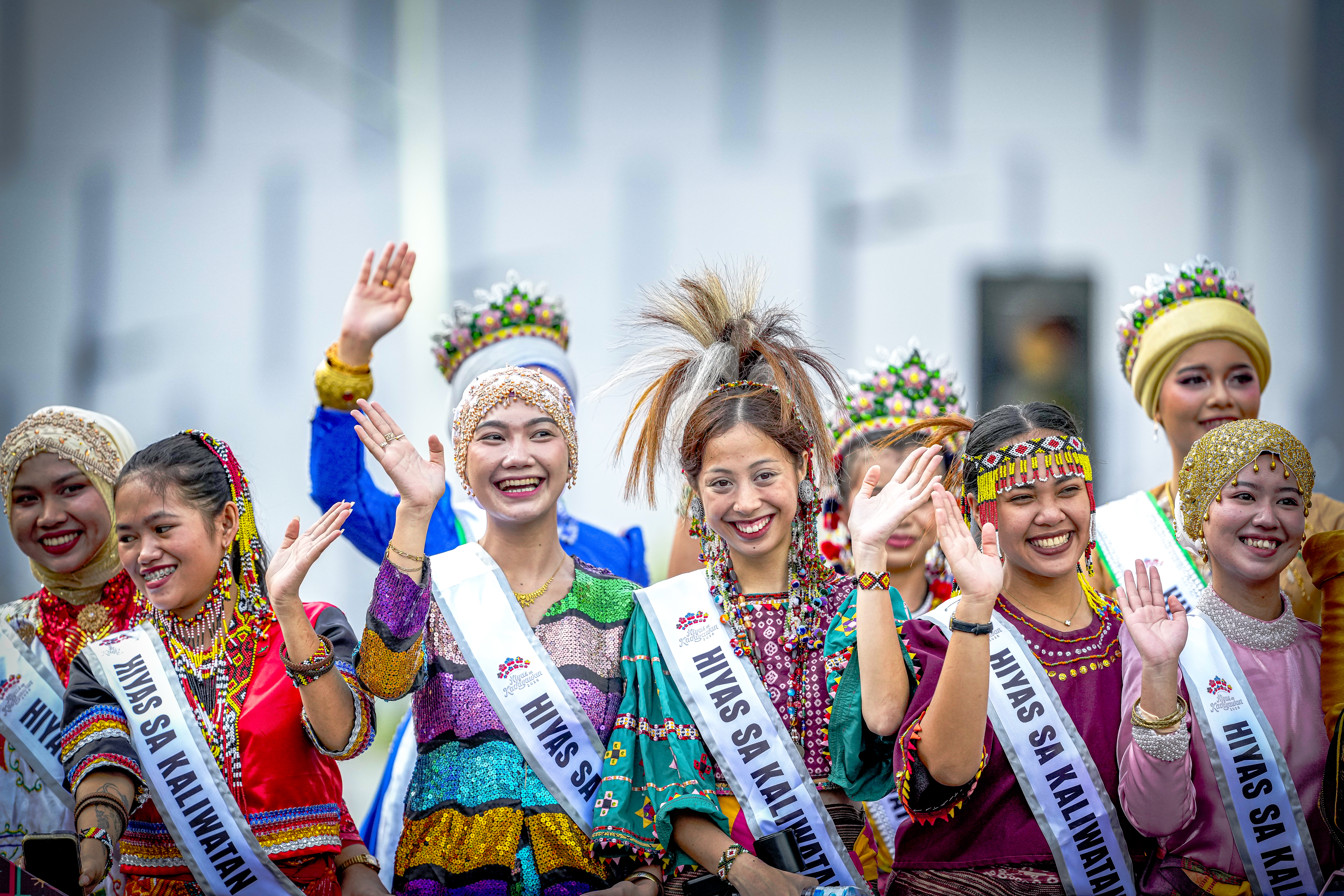

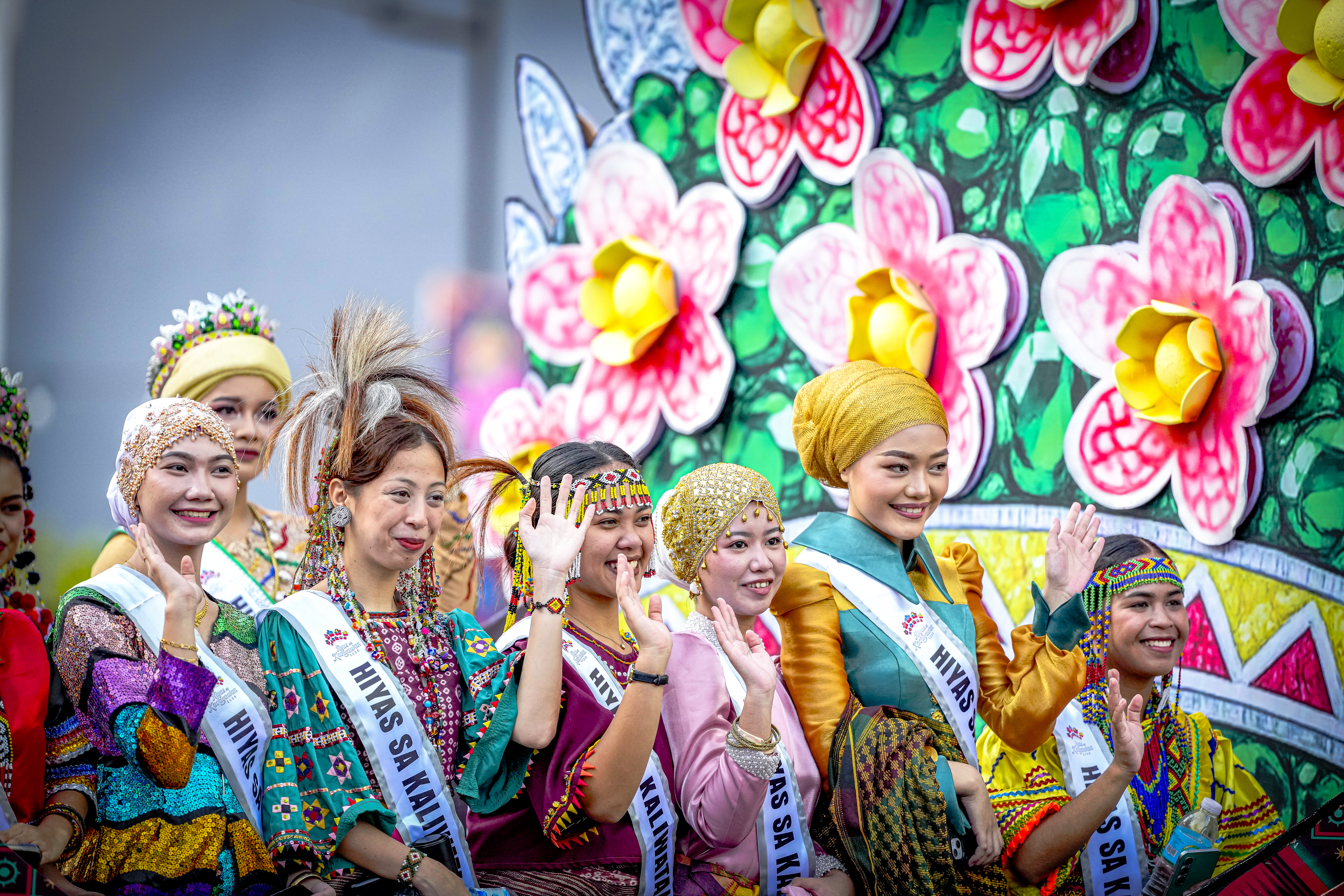

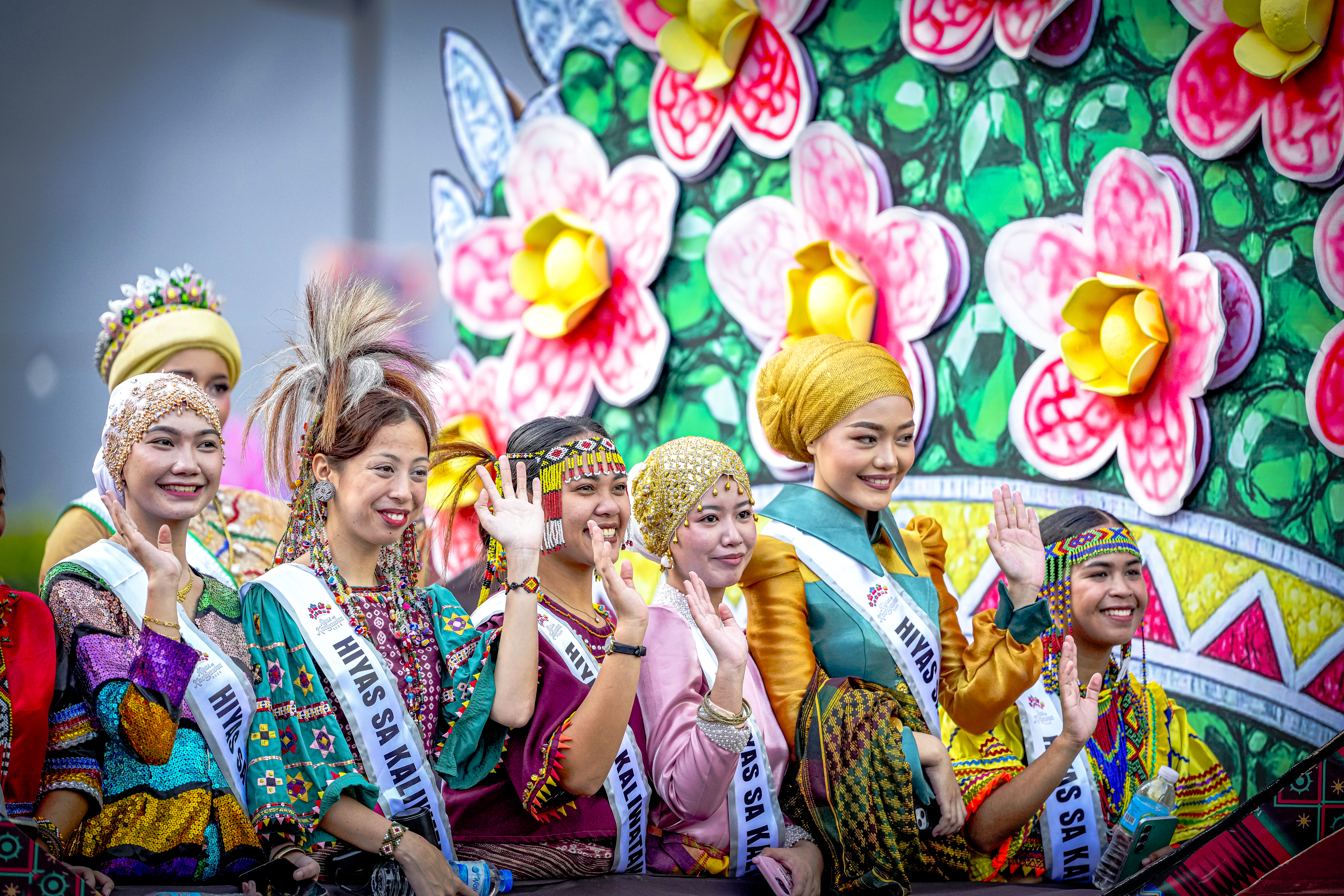

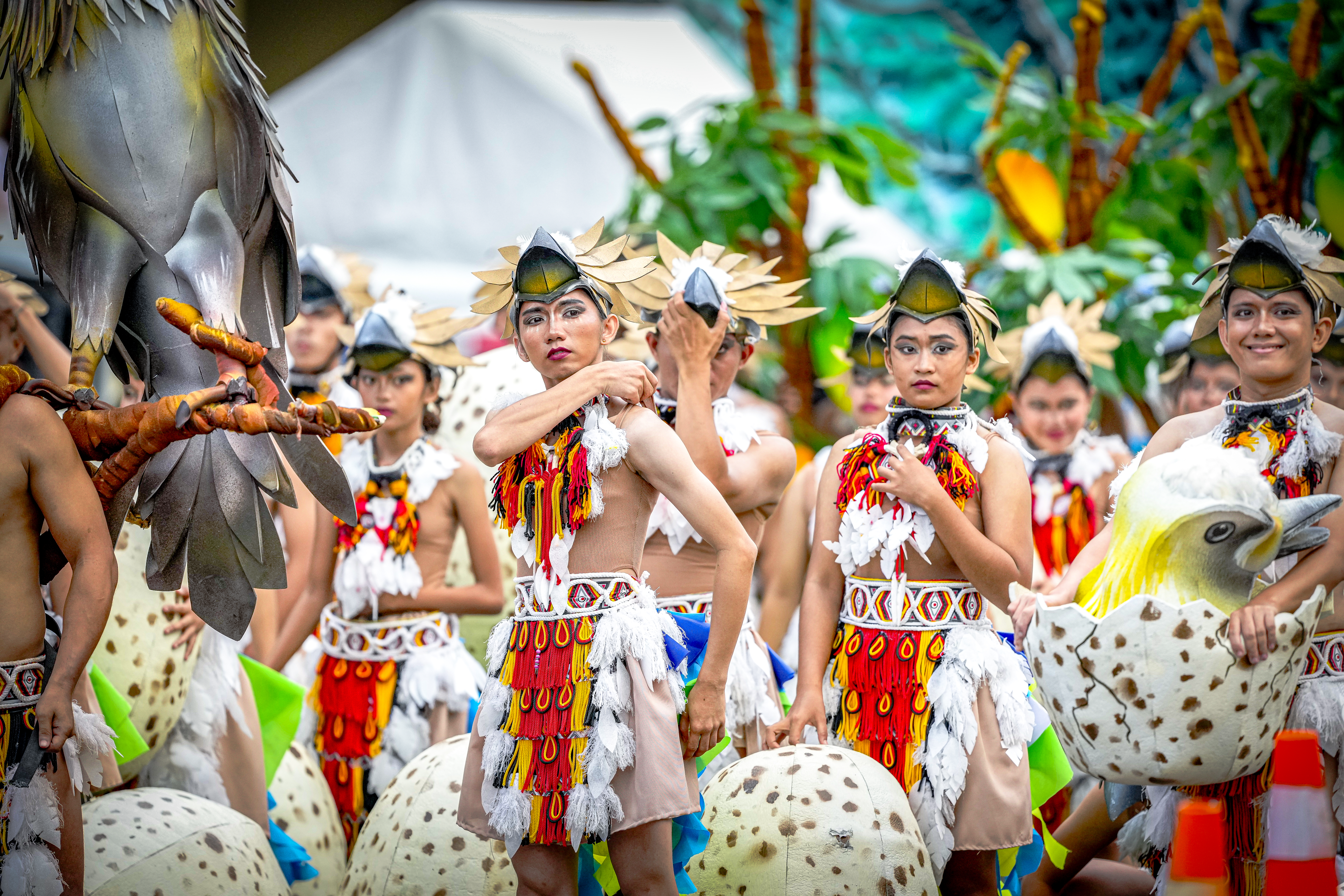

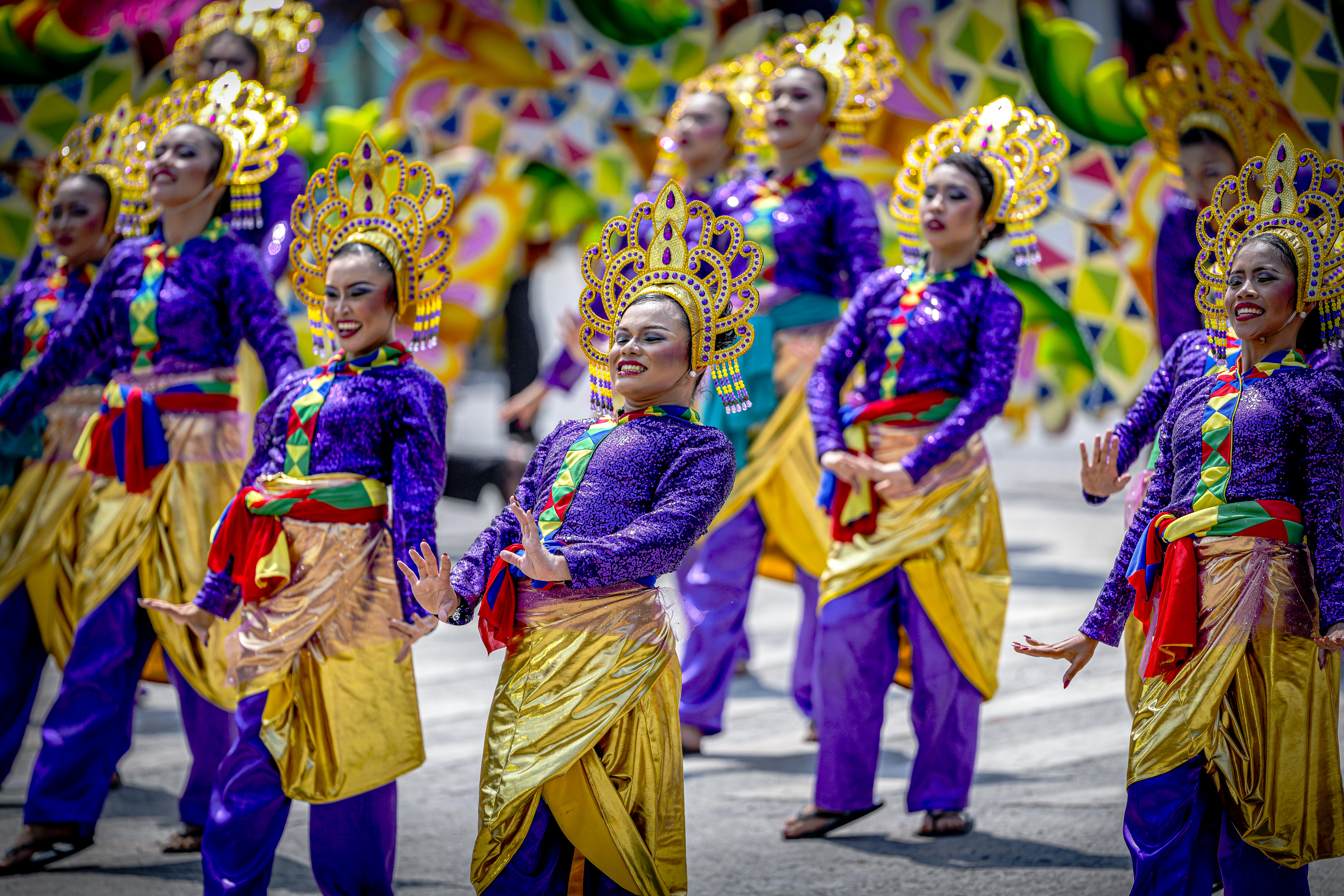

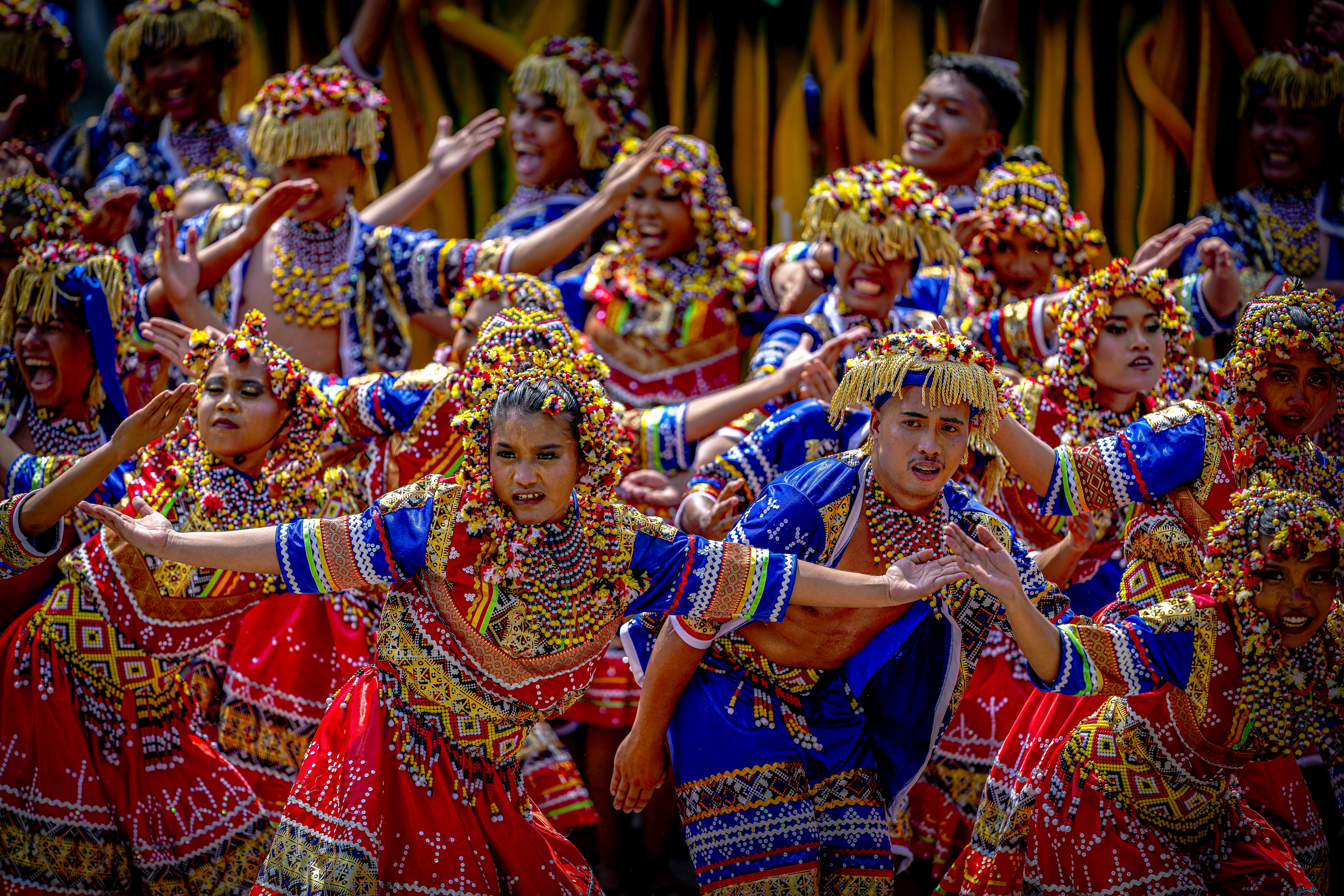

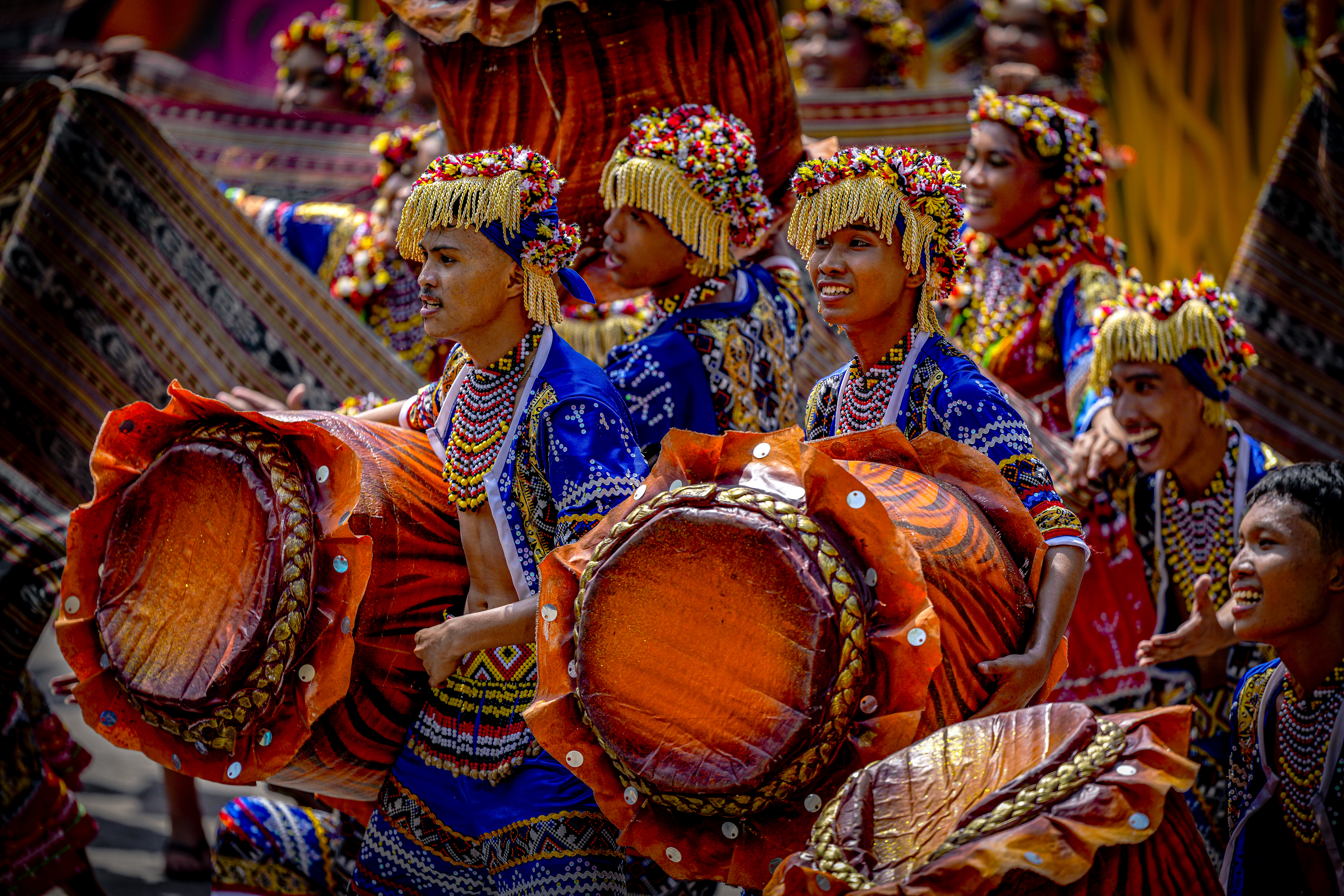
