= Regions of the Philippines =

Administrative divisions of the Philippines

- Administrative map of the Philippines
- Category: Region
- Location: Philippines
- Number: 18 (as of 2024)
- Possible status: Administrative region Autonomous region
- Populations: 1,791,121 (Cordillera) – 16,139,770 (Calabarzon)
- Areas: 636.00 km^{2} (245.56 sq mi) for Metro Manila – 29,620.90 km^{2} (11,436.69 sq mi) for Mimaropa
- Government: Regional development council Metropolitan development authority Autonomous regional government
- Subdivisions: Provinces Independent cities Municipalities Component cities Barangays

In the Philippines, regions (Filipino: rehiyon; ISO 3166-2:PH) are administrative divisions that primarily serve to coordinate planning and organize national government services across multiple local government units (LGUs). Most national government agencies provide services through their regional offices instead of maintaining direct provincial or city offices. Regional offices are usually, but not necessarily, located in the city designated as the regional center.

As of 2024, the Philippines is divided into 18 regions. Seventeen are administrative groupings, each with a regional development council (RDC) designated by the President. In the case of the National Capital Region (Metro Manila), a metropolitan development authority serves as the coordinating and policy-making body. Only one, the Bangsamoro Autonomous Region in Muslim Mindanao, has an elected government and parliament, to which the Congress of the Philippines has delegated certain powers and responsibilities.

== History ==
Regions first came to existence on September 24, 1972, when the provinces of the Philippines were organized into eleven regions under Presidential Decree No. 1 as part of the Integrated Reorganization Plan of President Ferdinand Marcos. Since that time, other regions have been created and some provinces have been transferred from one region to another.

=== Timeline ===
- First set of 11 regions created:
  - Region I – Ilocos Norte, Ilocos Sur, Abra, La Union, Benguet, Mountain Province
  - Region II – Batanes, Cagayan, Kalinga-Apayao, Isabela, Ifugao, Quirino, Nueva Vizcaya
  - Region III – Pangasinan, Zambales, Bataan, Tarlac, Nueva Ecija, Pampanga, Bulacan
  - Region IV – Quezon (incl. Aurora sub-province), Rizal, Laguna, Cavite, Batangas, Marinduque, Romblon, Oriental Mindoro, Occidental Mindoro, Palawan
  - Region V – Camarines Norte, Camarines Sur, Albay, Sorsogon, Catanduanes, Masbate
  - Region VI – Aklan, Capiz, Antique, Iloilo (incl. Guimaras sub-province), Negros Occidental
  - Region VII – Negros Oriental, Siquijor, Cebu, Bohol
  - Region VIII – Leyte (incl. Biliran sub-province), Southern Leyte, Northern Samar, (Western) Samar, Eastern Samar
  - Region IX – Zamboanga del Norte, Zamboanga del Sur, Basilan, Sulu
  - Region X – Bukidnon, Camiguin, Misamis Occidental, Misamis Oriental, Lanao del Norte, Lanao del Sur, Agusan del Norte, Agusan del Sur, Surigao del Norte, Surigao del Sur
  - Region XI – Empire Province of Cotabato, South Cotabato, Davao del Norte, Davao del Sur, Davao Oriental
- June 22, 1973 – Pangasinan is transferred from Region III (Central Luzon) to Region I (Ilocos Region).
- July 7, 1975 – Region XII is created, and some regions of Mindanao are reorganized.
  - Region XII – Lanao del Norte, Lanao del Sur, Maguindanao, North Cotabato, Sultan Kudarat
- July 25, 1975 – Regions IX and XII are declared as Autonomous Regions in Western and Central Mindanao, respectively.
- August 21, 1975 – Region IX is divided into Sub-Region IX-A and Sub-Region IX-B. Some regions in Mindanao are reorganized.
  - Sub-Region IX-A – Basilan, Sulu, Tawi-Tawi
  - Sub-Region IX-B – Zamboanga del Norte, Zamboanga del Sur
- November 7, 1975 – Metro Manila is created.
- January 23, 1976 – Metro Manila is separated from Southern Tagalog to become Region IV; Southern Tagalog becomes Region IV-A.
- June 2, 1978 – Metro Manila is declared the National Capital Region.
- June 11, 1978 – The regional center of Region IX is transferred from Jolo, Sulu to Zamboanga City.
- July 15, 1987 – The Cordillera Administrative Region is created.
  - CAR – Abra, Benguet (incl. Baguio), Ifugao, Kalinga-Apayao, Mountain Province.
- August 1, 1989 – The Autonomous Region in Muslim Mindanao (ARMM) is created. Region XII reverts to an administrative region.
  - ARMM – Lanao del Sur (excl. Marawi), Maguindanao (excl. Cotabato City), Sulu, Tawi-Tawi
  - Region IX – Zamboanga del Norte, Zamboanga del Sur, Basilan
  - Region XII – Lanao del Norte (incl. Iligan), City of Marawi, Cotabato City, (North) Cotabato, Sultan Kudarat
- January 30, 1990 – Residents reject in a plebiscite the ratification to create the Cordillera Autonomous Region.
- October 12, 1990 – Reorganization and/or renaming of the Mindanao regions.
  - Region IX (Western Mindanao) – Zamboanga del Norte, Zamboanga del Sur, Basilan, Misamis Occidental, Lanao del Norte, City of Marawi
    - The regional center of Region IX is transferred to Pagadian, with Zamboanga City remaining as the region's commercial and industrial center.
  - Region X (Northern Mindanao) – Misamis Oriental (incl. regional center of Cagayan de Oro), Bukidnon, Camiguin, Agusan del Norte, Agusan del Sur, Surigao del Norte
  - Region XI (Southern Mindanao) – Surigao del Sur, Davao del Norte, Davao del Sur, Davao Oriental
  - Region XII (Central Mindanao) – (North) Cotabato, Sultan Kudarat, South Cotabato
  - ARMM – Lanao del Sur (excl. Marawi), Maguindanao (excl. Cotabato City)
- February 23, 1995 – Region XIII (Caraga) is created and minor reorganization of some Mindanao regions occurs; Sultan Kudarat is transferred to Region XII.
  - Region XIII – Agusan del Norte, Agusan del Sur, Surigao del Norte, Surigao del Sur
- March 7, 1998 – Residents reject in a plebiscite for the second time the ratification to create the Cordillera Autonomous Region.
- December 18, 1998 – Sultan Kudarat is reverted to Region XII.
- March 31, 2001 – The ARMM is expanded.
  - ARMM – Lanao del Sur (now incl. Marawi), Maguindanao, Basilan (excl. Isabela), Sulu, Tawi-Tawi
- September 19, 2001 – Most Mindanao regions are reorganized and some are renamed, such as Region IX (Zamboanga Peninsula), Region XI (Davao Region), and Region XII (Soccsksargen).
  - Region IX – Zamboanga del Norte, Zamboanga del Sur, Zamboanga Sibugay, Zamboanga City, Isabela City
  - Region X – Bukidnon, Camiguin, Lanao del Norte, Misamis Occidental, Misamis Oriental
  - Region XI – Compostela Valley, Davao del Norte, Davao del Sur, Davao Oriental
  - Region XII – Cotabato, Sultan Kudarat, South Cotabato, Sarangani.
- May 17, 2002 – Region IV-A (Calabarzon) and Region IV-B (Mimaropa) are created from the former Region IV (Southern Tagalog); Aurora is transferred to Region III.
- October 28, 2003 – Calamba, Laguna is designated as the regional center of Region IV-A.
- March 30, 2004 – Koronadal is designated as the regional center of Region XII.
- May 23, 2005 – Palawan is transferred from Region IV-B to Region VI (Western Visayas).
- August 19, 2005 – The transfer of Palawan to Region VI is held in abeyance.
- November 22, 2007 – Calapan is designated as the regional center of Region IV-B.
- May 29, 2015 – The Negros Island Region (NIR) is created. Negros Occidental and Bacolod are transferred from Region VI, and Negros Oriental is removed from Region VII (Central Visayas).
- July 17, 2016 – The Southwestern Tagalog Region (Mimaropa Region) is established, comprising the former Region IV-B (in effect merely a renaming and discontinuation of the "Region IV-B" designation since no boundary changes are involved).
- August 7, 2017 – The NIR is abolished. Negros Occidental (including Bacolod) and Negros Oriental are reverted to Regions VI and VII, respectively.
- January 25, 2019 – The Bangsamoro Autonomous Region in Muslim Mindanao (BARMM) is created, replacing the ARMM after the ratification of the Bangsamoro Organic Law.
- June 11, 2024 – The NIR is re-established, with Siquijor transferred from Region VII.
- September 9, 2024 – Sulu is declared not part of the BARMM.
- July 30, 2025 – Sulu is reverted to Region IX.

== List of regions ==
As of June 30, 2024, the Philippines is divided into 18 regions. The traditional island groups of Luzon, the Visayas, and Mindanao are composed of eight (Regions I, II, III, IV-A, and V, and CAR, NCR, and Mimaropa), four (VI, VII, VIII, and NIR), and six (IX, X, XI, XII, XIII, and BARMM) regions, respectively. The names of Calabarzon, Mimaropa, and Soccsksargen are acronyms signifying their component provinces and cities; and are usually capitalized in official government documents.

=== Types of regions ===
==== Administrative region ====
An administrative region is a grouping of geographically adjacent LGUs that may be established, disestablished, and modified by the president of the Philippines based on the need to formulate coherent economic development policies, more efficiently provide national government services, and coordinate activities beneficial to the development of larger area beyond the province level. No plebiscites have been conducted so far to democratically confirm the creation, abolition or alteration of the boundaries of regular administrative regions, as the Constitution does not mandate it.

An administrative region is not a local government unit (LGU), but rather a group of LGUs to which the president has provided an unelected policy-making and coordinating structure, called the Regional Development Council (RDC). Metro Manila is recognized in law as a "special development and administrative region", and was thus given the Metropolitan Manila Development Authority (MMDA); the Metro Manila Council within the MMDA serves as the National Capital Region's RDC.

==== Autonomous region ====
The 1987 Constitution allows for the creation of autonomous regions in the Cordillera Central of Luzon and the Muslim-majority areas of Mindanao. However, only the Bangsamoro Autonomous Region in Muslim Mindanao and its predecessor, the Autonomous Region in Muslim Mindanao, have been approved by voters in plebiscites held in 1989, 2001, and 2019. Voters in the Cordilleras rejected autonomy in 1990 and 1998; hence the Cordillera Administrative Region remains as a regular administrative region with no delegated powers or responsibilities.

The Supreme Court has ruled that an autonomous region established by statute must be composed of more than one province, thereby invalidating the proposed establishment of the Autonomous Region of Ifugao following the results of the original 1990 Cordillera autonomy plebiscite, which saw only Ifugao's voters casting a majority 'yes' vote towards autonomy.

=== Table of regions ===
- Component local government units: the data column is limited to primary LGUs, which pertains to component provinces, highly urbanized cities, and independent component cities, as well as the independent municipality of Pateros. All city names, except those under the National Capital Region, are italicized.
- Location: the location map column can be sorted from north-to-south, west-to-east.

Location	Region (regional designation)	PSGC	Island group	Regional center	Component local government units	Area (Note: Land area figures are the sum of each region's component provinces and independent cities, derived from the National Statistical Coordination Board (Philippine Statistics Authority) official website. For the BARMM, land area is derived from the Bangsamoro Development Plan Integrative Report.)	Population (2024)	Density
Map of the Philippines highlighting the National Capital Region	National Capital Region (NCR)	13	Luzon	Manila	17: Caloocan; Las Piñas; Makati; Malabon; Mandaluyong; Manila; Marikina; Muntinlupa; Navotas; Parañaque; Pasay; Pasig; Pateros; Quezon City; San Juan; Taguig; Valenzuela	636.00 km^{2} (245.56 sq mi)	14,001,751 (12.42%)	20,247/km^{2} (52,440/sq mi)
Map of the Philippines highlighting the Cordillera Region	Cordillera Administrative Region (CAR)	14	Luzon	Baguio	7: Abra; Apayao; Baguio (Note: A highly urbanized city, independent from any province.); Benguet; Ifugao; Kalinga; Mountain Province	19,422.03 km^{2} (7,498.89 sq mi)	1,808,985 (1.60%)	89/km^{2} (230/sq mi)
Map of the Philippines highlighting the Ilocos Region	Ilocos Region (Region I)	01	Luzon	San Fernando	5: Dagupan (Note: An independent component city, not under the jurisdiction of any provincial government.); Ilocos Norte; Ilocos Sur; La Union; Pangasinan	13,012.60 km^{2} (5,024.19 sq mi)	5,342,453 (4.74%)	386/km^{2} (1,000/sq mi)
Map of the Philippines highlighting Cagayan Valley	Cagayan Valley (Region II)	02	Luzon	Tuguegarao	6: Batanes; Cagayan; Isabela; Nueva Vizcaya; Quirino; Santiago	28,228.83 km^{2} (10,899.21 sq mi)	3,777,608 (3.35%)	122/km^{2} (317/sq mi)
Map of the Philippines highlighting Central Luzon	Central Luzon (Region III)	03	Luzon	San Fernando	9: Angeles City; Aurora; Bataan; Bulacan; Nueva Ecija; Olongapo; Pampanga; Tarlac; Zambales	22,014.63 km^{2} (8,499.90 sq mi)	12,989,074 (11.52%)	510/km^{2} (1,320/sq mi)
Map of the Philippines highlighting Calabarzon	Calabarzon (Region IV-A)	04	Luzon	Calamba	6: Batangas; Cavite; Laguna; Lucena; Quezon; Rizal	16,873.31 km^{2} (6,514.82 sq mi)	16,933,234 (15.02%)	854/km^{2} (2,213/sq mi)
Map of the Philippines highlighting Mimaropa	Southwestern Tagalog Region (Mimaropa) (Note: Formerly designated as Region IV-B until 2016.)	17	Luzon	Calapan	6: Marinduque; Occidental Mindoro; Oriental Mindoro; Palawan; Puerto Princesa; Romblon	29,620.90 km^{2} (11,436.69 sq mi)	3,245,446 (2.88%)	100/km^{2} (259/sq mi)
Map of the Philippines highlighting the Bicol Region	Bicol Region (Region V)	05	Luzon	Legazpi	7: Albay; Camarines Norte; Camarines Sur; Catanduanes; Masbate; Naga; Sorsogon	18,155.82 km^{2} (7,010.00 sq mi)	6,064,426 (5.38%)	319/km^{2} (827/sq mi)
Map of the Philippines highlighting Western Visayas	Western Visayas (Region VI)	06	Visayas	Iloilo City	6: Aklan; Antique; Capiz; Guimaras; Iloilo; Iloilo City	12,750.63 km^{2} (4,923.05 sq mi)	4,861,911 (4.31%)	371/km^{2} (961/sq mi)
Map of the Philippines highlighting the Negros Island Region	Negros Island Region (NIR)	18	Visayas	Bacolod and Dumaguete (interim/de facto)	4: Bacolod; Negros Occidental; Negros Oriental; Siquijor	13,525.56 km^{2} (5,222.25 sq mi)	4,904,944 (4.35%)	352/km^{2} (912/sq mi)
Map of the Philippines highlighting Central Visayas	Central Visayas (Region VII)	07	Visayas	Cebu City	5: Bohol; Cebu; Cebu City; Lapu-Lapu; Mandaue	10,114.52 km^{2} (3,905.24 sq mi)	6,640,875 (5.89%)	647/km^{2} (1,676/sq mi)
Map of the Philippines highlighting Eastern Visayas	Eastern Visayas (Region VIII)	08	Visayas	Tacloban	8: Biliran; Eastern Samar; Leyte; Northern Samar; Ormoc; Samar; Southern Leyte; Tacloban	23,251.10 km^{2} (8,977.30 sq mi)	4,625,929 (4.10%)	191/km^{2} (495/sq mi)
Map of the Philippines highlighting Zamboanga Peninsula	Zamboanga Peninsula (Region IX)	09	Mindanao	Pagadian	6: Isabela (Note: A component city, part of the province of Basilan, but whose regional services are provided by the offices of Region IX.); Sulu; Zamboanga City; Zamboanga del Norte; Zamboanga del Sur; Zamboanga Sibugay	17,056.73 km^{2} (6,585.64 sq mi)	5,089,934 (4.52%)	213/km^{2} (551/sq mi)
Map of the Philippines highlighting Northern Mindanao	Northern Mindanao (Region X)	10	Mindanao	Cagayan de Oro	7: Bukidnon; Cagayan de Oro; Camiguin; Iligan; Lanao del Norte; Misamis Occidental; Misamis Oriental	20,496.02 km^{2} (7,913.56 sq mi)	5,178,326 (4.59%)	229/km^{2} (593/sq mi)
Map of the Philippines highlighting the Davao Region	Davao Region (Region XI)	11	Mindanao	Davao City	6: Davao City; Davao de Oro; Davao del Norte; Davao del Sur; Davao Occidental; Davao Oriental	20,357.42 km^{2} (7,860.04 sq mi)	5,389,422 (4.78%)	245/km^{2} (634/sq mi)
Map of the Philippines highlighting Soccsksargen	Soccsksargen (Region XII)	12	Mindanao	Koronadal	5: Cotabato (Note: The province of Cotabato, which is part of the Soccsksargen region, has 63 of its barangays included in the BARMM.); General Santos; Sarangani; South Cotabato; Sultan Kudarat	22,513.30 km^{2} (8,692.43 sq mi)	4,462,776 (4.0%)	202/km^{2} (523/sq mi)
Map of the Philippines highlighting Caraga	Caraga (Region XIII)	16	Mindanao	Butuan	6: Agusan del Norte; Agusan del Sur; Butuan; Dinagat Islands; Surigao del Norte; Surigao del Sur	21,478.35 km^{2} (8,292.84 sq mi)	2,865,196 (2.54%)	121/km^{2} (313/sq mi)
Map of the Philippines highlighting the Bangsamoro Autonomous Region in Muslim Mindanao	Bangsamoro (BARMM) (Note: Following the Bangsamoro autonomy plebiscite and the ratification of the Bangsamoro Organic Law, the Autonomous Region in Muslim Mindanao (ARMM) was superseded by the Bangsamoro Autonomous Region in Muslim Mindanao (BARMM) in February 2019, which transferred the provinces and cities already in the ARMM, as well as surrounding communities that voted for inclusion.)	19	Mindanao	Cotabato City	7: Basilan (excluding Isabela); Cotabato City; Lanao del Sur; Maguindanao del Norte; Maguindanao del Sur; Tawi-Tawi; Special Geographic Area	11,935.7 km^{2} (4,608.4 sq mi)	4,545,486 (4.03%)	330/km^{2} (856/sq mi)

=== Judicial regions ===
As far as the judiciary is concerned, specifically the first and second level courts, the country is divided into judicial regions as provided by Batas Pambansa Bilang 129. The coverage of these judicial regions generally coincides with that of the administrative regions in 1980, with some exceptions.

=== Legislative districts ===
Representation for the Interim Batasang Pambansa was mostly through parliamentary districts based on how regions were organized in 1978. Metro Manila was "Region IV", while Southern Tagalog was "Region IV-A". This was the only time the national legislature was represented via regions; in a 1984 plebiscite, voters approved a constitutional amendment that reverted to representation per province and city.

== Proposed regions ==
- Cordillera Autonomous Region (proposal to convert the Cordillera Administrative Region into an autonomous region; see Cordillera autonomy movement)
- Samar Administrative Region
- Bangsa Sug or Basulta Autonomous Region (proposed to separate the Sulu Archipelago from the mainland portion of Bangsamoro)

== Defunct regions ==
The following are regions that no longer exist, listed along with their current status:

- Southern Tagalog (Region IV, now divided into Calabarzon, Central Luzon (Aurora), Metro Manila (several cities that were part of Rizal), and Mimaropa; the name remains as a cultural-geographic region only)
- Western Mindanao (renamed as Zamboanga Peninsula, still designated as Region IX)
- Central Mindanao (now mostly Soccsksargen, still designated as Region XII)
- Southern Mindanao (now mostly Davao Region, still designated as Region XI)
- Autonomous Region in Muslim Mindanao (replaced by Bangsamoro)

== See also ==
- List of regions of the Philippines by GDP
- Super regions of the Philippines
- Federalism in the Philippines
- ISO 3166-2:PH
