= Local government in the Philippines =

In the Philippines, local government is divided into three levels: provinces and independent cities, component cities and municipalities, and barangays, all of which are collectively known as local government units (LGUs). In some areas, above provinces and independent chartered cities are autonomous regions, such as the Bangsamoro Autonomous Region in Muslim Mindanao. Some towns and cities remit their revenue to national government and is returned through the national government through a process called internal revenue allotment. Below barangays in some cities and municipalities are sitios and puroks. All of these, with the exception of sitios and puroks, elect their own executives and legislatures. Sitios and puroks are often but not necessarily led by an elected barangay councilor.

Provinces and independent cities are organized into national government regions but those are administrative regions and not separately governed areas with their own elected governments.

According to the Constitution of the Philippines, the local governments "shall enjoy local autonomy", and in which the Philippine president exercises "general supervision". Congress enacted the Local Government Code of the Philippines in 1991 to "provide for a more responsive and accountable local government structure instituted through a system of decentralization with effective mechanisms of recall, initiative, and referendum, allocate among the different local government units their powers, responsibilities, and resources, and provide for the qualifications, election, appointment and removal, term, salaries, powers and functions and duties of local officials, and all other matters relating to the organization and operation of local units." Local government units are under the oversight of the Department of the Interior and Local Government, which is an executive department tasked with assisting the president in exercising the power of general supervision.

== Levels of local government ==
Local government hierarchy

President of the Philippines
Autonomous regions
Provinces	Independent cities	Provinces	Independent cities
Component cities	Municipalities	Component cities	Municipalities
Barangays	Barangays	Barangays	Barangays	Barangays	Barangays

The dashed lines emanating from the president means that the President only exercises general supervision on local government.

=== Autonomous regions ===
Autonomous regions have more powers than other local governments. The constitution limits the creation of autonomous regions to Muslim Mindanao and the Cordilleras but only one autonomous region exists: the Bangsamoro, which replaced the Autonomous Region in Muslim Mindanao (ARMM). In 1989, a plebiscite established the ARMM. In 2001, a plebiscite in the ARMM confirmed the previous composition of the autonomous region and added Basilan (except for the city of Isabela) and Marawi in Lanao del Sur. Isabela City remains a part of the province of Basilan despite rejecting inclusion in the ARMM. In 2019, another plebiscite confirmed the replacement of the ARMM with the Bangsamoro, and added Cotabato City and 63 barangays in Cotabato.

A Cordillera Autonomous Region has never been formed because two plebiscites, in 1990 and 1998, both resulted in just one province supporting autonomy; this led the Supreme Court ruling that autonomous regions should not be composed of just one province.

Each autonomous region has a unique form of government. The ARMM had a regional governor and a regional legislative assembly, mimicking the presidential system of the national government. The Bangsamoro will have a chief minister responsible to parliament, with parliament appointing a wa'lī, or a ceremonial governor, in a parliamentary system.

=== Provinces ===
Outside the lone autonomous region, the provinces are the highest-level local government. The provinces are organized into component cities and municipalities. A province is governed by the governor and a legislature known as the Sangguniang Panlalawigan.

=== Cities and municipalities ===
Municipal government in the Philippines is divided into three – independent cities, component cities, and municipalities (sometimes referred to as towns). Several cities across the country are "independent cities" which means that they are not governed by a province, even though like Iloilo City the provincial capitol might be in the city. Independent city residents do not vote for nor hold provincial offices. Far more cities are component cities and are a part of a province. Municipalities are always a part of a province except for Pateros which was separated from Rizal to form Metro Manila.

Cities and municipalities are governed by mayors and legislatures, which are called the Sangguniang Panlungsod in cities and the Sangguniang Bayan in municipalities.

=== Barangays ===
Every city and municipality in the Philippines is divided into barangays, the smallest of the local government units. Barangays can be further divided into sitios and puroks but those divisions do not have leaders elected in formal elections supervised by the national government.

A barangay's executive is the Punong Barangay or barangay captain (colloquially Kapitan, adapted from Spanish) and its legislature is the Sangguniang Barangay, composed of the Kapitan, the Barangay Kagawads (barangay councilors, (colloquially Tanod) and the Sangguniang Kabataan (SK) Chairperson, colloquially called/referred to by the organization itself SK (i.e. without 'Chairman', 'Head', 'Leader') . The SK is composed of the Chairperson and 7 SK Kagawads who also lead the assembly of/for youth, the Katipunan ng Kabataan or KK.

== Offices ==
Local governments have two branches: executive and legislative. All courts in the Philippines are under the Supreme Court of the Philippines and therefore there are no local-government controlled judicial branches. Nor do local governments have any prosecutors or public defenders, as those are under the jurisdiction of the national government.

The executive branch is composed of the Wali as the head of region and Chief Minister as the head of government for the Bangsamoro, governor for the provinces, mayor for the cities and municipalities, and the barangay captain for the barangays.

=== Legislatures ===
The legislatures review the ordinances and resolutions enacted by the legislatures below. Aside from regular and ex-officio members, the legislatures above the barangay level also have three sectoral representatives, one each from women, agricultural or industrial workers, and other sectors.

Level of government	Legislature	Composition	Head
Autonomous region	Parliament	total of 80 members: 40 seats in a party-list system of allocation; 32 seats, 1 elected from each district; 8 reserved seats: 2 from non-Moro indigenous peoples; 2 from settler communities; 1 for women; 1 for youth; 1 for traditional leaders; 1 for the Ulama	Speaker
Province	Sangguniang Panlalawigan (Note: Provinces that comprise a single congressional district are divided into two SP districts. For provinces comprising multiple congressional districts, boundaries of SP and congressional districts are coterminous, with the exception of the following: • Independent cities which are not allowed by law to participate in electing provincial officials are excluded from SP districts. • The 1st and 2nd Congressional districts of Antipolo also serve de facto as SP districts of Rizal, with each being allocated one regular SP member.)	varies, as of 2025: Cavite, Cebu (Note: The lone district of Mandaue also serves de facto as an SP district of Cebu, and is allocated two regular SP members.): 16 SP members, 2 elected from each district; Bulacan (Note: The lone district of San Jose del Monte also serves de facto as an SP district of Bulacan, and is allocated two regular SP members.), Laguna (Note: The lone district of Biñan also serves de facto as an SP district of Laguna, and is allocated two regular SP members.) (Note: The lone district of Calamba also serves de facto as an SP district of Laguna, and is allocated two regular SP members.) (Note: The lone district of Santa Rosa also serves de facto as an SP district of Laguna, and is allocated two regular SP members.): 14 SP members, 2 elected from each district; Batangas, Isabela, (Note: Santiago City is excluded from the 4th SP district of Isabela.) Negros Occidental and Pangasinan: (Note: Dagupan is excluded from the 4th SP district of Pangasinan.) 12 SP members, 2 elected from each district; All other provinces of the first and second income classes: (Note: Independent cities excluded from provincial elections: • Naga from Camarines Sur—3rd • Tacloban from Leyte—1st • Ormoc from Leyte—4th • Cotabato City from Maguindanao del Norte—1st • Puerto Princesa from Palawan—3rd • Angeles City from Pampanga—1st • Olongapo from Zambales—1st.) 10 SP members, with seat distribution among districts varying. (Note: The manner of seat distribution varies, per Republic Act No. 7166: • For provinces comprising multiple congressional districts and need no boundary adjustments due to independent cities being excluded: each district receives the same number of members first, then any remainder will get assigned to the districts with higher population counts. • For provinces comprising multiple congressional districts but have district boundary adjustments: seats are distributed according to the population size of each SP district after factoring out the independent cities. • For provinces comprising a single congressional district: seats are usually distributed equally between the two SP districts drawn by COMELEC, although proportional allocation exists in cases where geography and circumstance have resulted in grossly uneven SP district population distributions (e.g. Benguet's and Sarangani's SP districts).); Provinces of the third and fourth income classes: 8 SP members, with seat distribution among districts varying.; Provinces of the fifth and sixth income classes: 6 SP members, 3 per district; President of the provincial chapter of the Liga ng mga Barangay; President of the provincial chapter of the League of Councilors; President of the provincial federation of the Sangguniang Kabataan; Sectoral representatives	Provincial Vice Governor
City	Sangguniang Panlungsod (Note: The number of city council members and districts varies per city, as determined by different statutes. For cities comprising multiple congressional districts, boundaries of city council districts are coterminous with congressional districts, with the exception of the Legislative district of Taguig-Pateros which encompasses the 2nd SP district of Taguig and the 1st and 2nd SB districts of Pateros. By law, some cities that are not divided into multiple congressional districts are specifically divided into two (Bacoor, Calbayog, Las Piñas, Malabon, Mandaluyong, Muntinlupa, Navotas, Pasay, Pasig, San Jose del Monte, San Juan) or three (Samal, Sorsogon City) city council districts.)	varies, as of 2025: Manila and Quezon City: 36 councilors, 6 elected from each district; Davao City: 24 councilors, 8 elected from each district; Taguig: 24 councilors, 12 elected from each district; Antipolo, Cagayan de Oro, Cebu City, Makati, Marikina, Muntinlupa, Parañaque, Zamboanga City: 16 councilors, 8 elected from each district; Bacoor, Calbayog, Las Piñas, Malabon, Mandaluyong, Navotas, Pasay, Pasig, San Jose del Monte, San Juan, Valenzuela: 12 councilors, 6 elected from each district; Samal, Sorsogon City: 12 councilors, 4 elected from each district; Bacolod, Baguio, Batangas City, Biñan, Butuan, Calamba, Dasmariñas, General Santos, General Trias, Iligan, Iloilo City, Imus, Lapu-Lapu, Lipa, Mandaue, San Fernando (La Union), San Pedro, Santa Rosa, Tuguegarao: 12 councilors, elected at-large; All other cities: 10 councilors, elected at-large; President of the city chapter of the Liga ng mga Barangay; President of the city federation of the Sangguniang Kabataan; Sectoral representatives	City Vice Mayor
Municipality	Sangguniang Bayan	varies, as of 2025: Pateros: 12 councilors, 6 elected from each district; All other municipalities: 8 councilors, elected at-large; President of the municipal chapter of the Liga ng mga Barangay; President of the municipal federation of the Sangguniang Kabataan; Sectoral representatives	Municipal Vice Mayor
Barangay	Sangguniang Barangay	7 members elected at-large; Sangguniang Kabataan chairperson	Barangay Captain/Barangay Chairman
Barangay	Sangguniang Kabataan	7 members elected at-large	Sangguniang Kabataan Chairperson

=== Elected officials ===
All elected officials have 3-year terms, save for the wa'lī which is six years, and can only serve a maximum of three consecutive terms before being ineligible for reelection.

LGU	Official	Minimum age (18 is the voting age)
Autonomous region	Wa'lī (Regional Chief Executive)	40 years old on election day (Same as the President and Vice President of the Philippines)
Autonomous region	Chief minister	25 years old on election day
Autonomous region	Member of parliament	Same as chief minister
Provinces	Provincial Governor (Local Chief Executive)	23 years old on election day
Provinces	Provincial Vice Governor	Same as governor
Provinces	Sangguniang Panlalawigan member (board member)	Same as governor
Highly urbanized cities	City Mayor (Local Chief Executive)	Same as governor
Highly urbanized cities	City Vice mayor	Same as governor
Highly urbanized cities	Sangguniang Panlungsod member (City Councilor)	Same as governor
Independent component and component cities	City Mayor (Local Chief Executive)	21 years old on election day
Independent component and component cities	City Vice mayor	Same as independent component and component city mayor
Independent component and component cities	Sangguniang Panlungsod member (City Councilor)	Same as independent component and component city mayor
Municipalities	Municipal Mayor (Local Chief Executive)	Same as independent component and component city mayor
Municipalities	Municipal Vice mayor	Same as independent component and component city mayor
Municipalities	Sangguniang Bayan member (Municipal Councilor)	Same as independent component and component city mayor
Barangay	Punong Barangay (Barangay Captain/Chairperson; Barangay Chief Executive)	18 years old on election day
Barangay	Barangay Kagawad (Barangay Councilor)	Same as Punong Barangay
Barangay	Sangguniang Kabataan Chairperson/President (SK Chief Executive)	18 to 24 years old on election day
Barangay	Sangguniang Kabataan member (SK Councilor)	Same as Sangguniang Kabataan chairperson*

*a Sangguniang Kabataan official who has surpassed 21 years of age while in office is allowed to serve for the rest of the term.

=== Offices that are common to municipalities, cities and provinces ===
There are 44 offices in a government, whether it is municipal, city or provincial. There are some mandatory and optional offices to the government.

Office	Head	Municipality	City	Province
Office of the Secretary to the Sanggunian	Secretary to the Sanggunian	Yes	Yes	Yes
Treasury Office	Treasurer	Yes	Yes	Yes
Assessment Office	Assessor	Yes	Yes	Yes
Accounting Office	Accountant	Yes	Yes	Yes
Budget Office	Budget Officer	Yes	Yes	Yes
Planning and Development Office	Planning and Development Coordinator	Yes	Yes	Yes
Engineering Office	Engineer	Yes	Yes	Yes
Health Office	Health Officer	Yes	Yes	Yes
Office of the Local Civil Registry	Local Civil Registrar	Yes	Yes	No
Office of the Administrator	Administrator	Yes	Yes	Yes
Office of the Legal Services	Legal Officer	Optional	Yes	Yes
Agriculture Office	Agriculturist	Yes	Yes	Yes
Social Welfare and Development Office	Social Welfare and Development Officer	Yes	Yes	Yes
Environment and Natural Resources Office	Environment and Natural Resources Officer	Yes	Yes	Yes
Office of Architectural Planning and Design	Architect	Optional	Optional	Optional
Public Information Office	Public Information Officer	Optional	Optional	Optional
Office for the Development of Cooperatives/Cooperatives Development Office	Cooperative Development Specialist	No	Optional	Optional
Population Office	Population Officer	Optional	Optional	Optional
Veterinary Office	Veterinarian	Yes	Yes	Yes
Public Order and Safety Office (POSO)	Public Order and Safety Officer	Optional	Optional	Optional
General Services Office	General Services Officer	Yes	Yes	Yes
Tourism Office	Tourism Officer	Yes	Yes	Yes
Public Employment Services Office (PESO)	PESO Manager	Yes	Yes	Yes
Human Resources Management and Development	HRMD Officer	Yes	Yes	Yes
Disaster Risk Reduction and Management Office	DRRM Officer	Yes	Yes	Yes
Economic Enterprise and Development Office	EED Officer	Yes	Yes	No
Office of the Mayor	Mayor	Yes	Yes	No
Office of the Vice Mayor	Vice Mayor	Yes	Yes	No
Office of the Provincial Governor	Provincial Governor	No	No	Yes
Office of the Provincial Vice Governor	Provincial Vice Governor	No	No	Yes
Office of the Sangguniang Panlalawigan	Presiding Officer (Provincial Vice Governor)	No	No	Yes
Office of the Sangguniang Panlungsod	Presiding Officer (City Vice Mayor)	No	Yes	No
Office of the Sangguniang Bayan	Presiding Officer (Municipal Vice Mayor)	Yes	No	No
Office of the Senior Citizens' Affairs (OSCA)	OSCA Head	Yes	Yes	No
Persons With Disability Affairs Office (PWDAO)	PWDAO Head	Yes	Yes	Yes
Nutrition Action Office	Nutrition Action Officer	Yes	Yes	Yes
Prosecution Office	Prosecutor	Yes	Yes	Yes
Solid Waste and Environment Management Office (SWEMO)	SWEMO Head	Yes	Yes	No
Gender And Development (GAD) Office	GAD Officer	Yes	Yes	Yes
Information Technology (IT) Office	IT Officer	Yes	Yes	Yes
Local Government Operations Office	Local Government Operations Officer	Yes	Yes	Yes

Source: Local Government Code of 1991

== Responsibilities ==
Among the social services and facilities that local government should provide, as stipulated in Section 17 of the Local Government Code, are the following:

- facilities and research services for agriculture and fishery activities, which include seedling nurseries, demonstration farms, and irrigation systems;
- health services, which include access to primary health care, maternal and child care, and medicines, medical supplies and equipment;
- social welfare services, which include programs and projects for women, children, elderly, and persons with disabilities, as well as vagrants, beggars, street children, juvenile delinquents, and victims of drug abuse;
- information services, which include job placement information systems and a public library;
- a solid waste disposal system or environmental management system;
- municipal/city/provincial buildings, cultural centers, public parks, playgrounds, and sports facilities and equipment;
- infrastructure facilities such as roads, bridges, school buildings, health clinics, fish ports, water supply systems, seawalls, dikes, drainage and sewerage, and traffic signals and road signs;
- state/local colleges and universities;
- public markets, slaughterhouses, and other local enterprises;
- public cemeteries, memorial parks/gardens, and columbariums;
- tourism facilities and other tourist attractions; and
- sites for police and fire stations and substations and municipal jail.
- water districts

== Creation and modification ==
As a matter of principle, higher legislative entities have the power to create, divide, merge, abolish, or substantially alter boundaries of any lower-level local government through a law or ordinance, all subject to approval by a majority of the votes cast in a plebiscite to be conducted by the Commission on Elections (COMELEC) in the local government unit or units directly affected. The Local Government Code has also set requisites for creating local government units. A summary can be found in the table below:

Local government	Area	Population	Income	Legislative bodies that can create, merge, abolish or substantially alter the boundaries of the LGU
Province	2,000 square kilometers (770 sq mi) (Note: Either area or population; meeting only one of these requirements is sufficient)	250,000	₱20 million for the last two consecutive years based on 1991 constant prices	Congress (Note: The Bangsamoro Parliament's predecessor, the ARMM Regional Legislative Assembly, was conferred by Congress (through Article VI, Section 19 of Republic Act No. 9054) the power to create or modify lower-level LGUs under its jurisdiction, including provinces and cities. However, the Supreme Court's decision on the unconstitutionality of the now-defunct province of Shariff Kabunsuan has effectively confined the regional assembly's powers to creating or modifying only municipalities and barangays.)
City	100 square kilometers (39 sq mi)	150,000	₱100 million for the last two consecutive years based on 2000 constant prices	Congress; Bangsamoro Parliament
Municipality	50 square kilometers (19 sq mi)	25,000	₱2.5 million for the last two consecutive years based on 1991 constant prices	Congress; Bangsamoro Parliament
Barangay	None	5,000 (Note: In Metro Manila and highly urbanized cities.); 2,000 (Note: Rest of the country.)	None	Congress; Bangsamoro Parliament; Sangguniang Panlalawigan, with recommendation from the concerned Sangguniang Bayan(s) required; Sangguniang Panlungsod

== See also ==
- List of primary local government units of the Philippines
