= Cordillera autonomy movement =

1980s–present northern Philippine autonomy movement

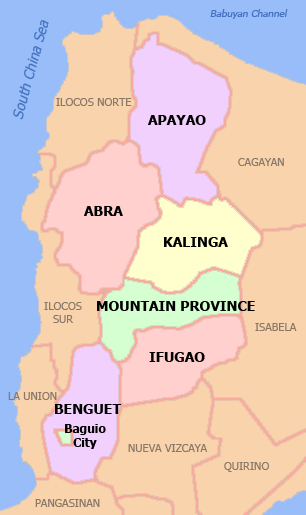
Political map of the Cordillera Administrative Region

The Cordillera autonomy movement in the Philippines refers to the campaign for greater autonomy for the Cordilleras, a mountain range in northern Luzon.

The 1986 Constitution allows for the establishment of two autonomous regions in the country: one in Muslim Mindanao (where Bangsamoro is located) and one in the Cordilleras. In pursuit of this autonomy, two plebiscites (1990 and 1998) were conducted in the Cordillera, but a majority of voters rejected autonomy. The area is currently under the jurisdiction of the Cordillera Administrative Region.

There are still efforts from some local sectors to establish an autonomous region in the Cordillera.

== Background ==
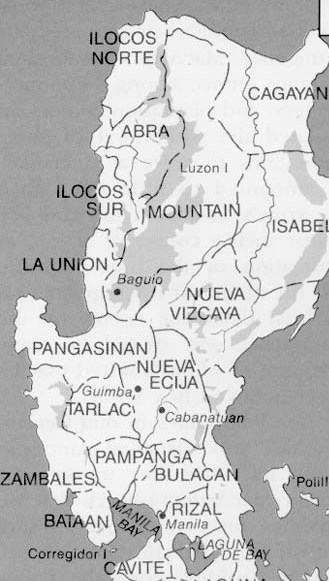
An old U.S. Army map showing Mountain province covering the present areas of Benguet, Ifugao, Kalinga and Apayao

During the Spanish colonial era, the Spaniards referred to the inhabitants of the Cordilleras as the Ygorrotes or the Igorots, while the Americans, starting in 1908, governed the area as part of a single locality called the Mountain Province. People from outside the region, or the lowlanders as they are known in the Cordillera, often referred to all ethnic people in the area under the single label, Igorot. Unlike the people in the southern Philippines, the Moro, who organized themselves in large polities such as sultanates, the Cordilleran people had independent tribes governed by tribal councils. These are among the facts used to argue for a pan-Cordillera identity.

== Cordillera conflict ==
There is a movement for self-determination among the people of the Cordilleras in Luzon, however, there were no secessionists in the region calling for the independence of the Cordilleras from the Philippines. The armed Cordillera struggle was derived from the communist rebellion in the Philippines during the regime of President Ferdinand Marcos. The Communist Party of the Philippines and the New People's Army's goal was to overthrow Marcos, fight what they perceived as imperialism by the United States, after which they planned to establish a people's democratic republic. The affiliate of the National Democratic Front, the Cordillera People's Democratic Front, aimed for the "liberation" of the country along with the Cordilleras from these twin challenges according to its 1981 eight-point general program.

The Cordillera People's Liberation Army, a group which separated from the NPA in 1986, along with the Montanosa National Solidarity and the Cordillera Bodong Administration, fought for greater autonomy in the Cordillera and against what it perceived as internal colonialism by the Philippine central government. The CPLA advocated use and stewardship of lands by communes as opposed to private proprietorship and direct democracy through village assemblies and council of elders. It also promoted the bodong system as a "supra-tribal expression" of the "spirit of social cooperation". They also proposed the conversion of the country into a federal republic as an alternative, with each state having co-equal status.

On September 13, 1986, the CPLA and the Government of the Philippines made a "sipat" or cessation of hostilities in Mt. Data Hotel, in Bauko, Mountain Province. The agreement between the two entities was dubbed the 1986 Mount Data Peace Accord. Furthermore, the Manabo pagta or covenant was signed on December 1, 1986, in Manabo, Abra, by local tribal elders. The 1987 Philippine Constitution included the prospect of autonomy for the Cordillera region.

== Establishment of the Cordillera Administrative Region ==
The Mount Data Peace Accord and the Manabo Pagta led to the establishment of the Cordillera Administrative Region through the issuance of Executive Order 220 on July 15, 1987, by then President Corazon C. Aquino, with the intention of converting the region to an autonomous one. The provinces of Abra, Benguet and Mountain Province (of the Ilocos Region), and Ifugao and Kalinga-Apayao (of Cagayan Valley) were annexed as part of the newly created region.

Several attempts at legalizing autonomy in the Cordillera region have failed in two separate plebiscites. An affirmative vote for the law on regional autonomy is a precondition under the 1987 Philippine Constitution to give the region autonomy in self-governance, much like the Autonomous Region in Muslim Mindanao in southern Philippines. The first law, Republic Act No. 6766, took effect on October 23, 1989, but failed to muster a majority vote in the plebiscite on January 30, 1990. The second law, Republic Act No. 8438, passed by Congress of the Philippines on December 22, 1997, also failed to pass the approval of the Cordillera peoples in a region-wide referendum on March 7, 1998. Political analysts have stated that "people's lack of understanding of the autonomy issue, compounded by misinformation drives by some sectors", was the primary factor against Cordillera autonomy.

== Continued campaign for Cordillera autonomy ==
A closure agreement between the CPLA and the Government of the Philippines was signed on July 4, 2011, at the Rizal Hall in Malacañan Palace. The agreement calls for the disarmament of the group, the reintegration of the militants into mainstream society and the conversion of the militant group into a socio-economic organization. While the group has stopped armed confrontation, the CPLA remains extant as of 2013, still campaigning for greater autonomy in the Cordilleras with about 1,000 members.

There are efforts to make a third bid to legalize autonomy in the Cordillera. Bills to establish an Organic Act for an autonomous region in Cordillera include House Bill No. 5595 filed during the 15th Congress and House Bill No. 4649 filed during the 16th Congress, both of which failed to pass. In the 17th Congress, House Bill No. 5343, "An Act Establishing the Autonomous Region of the Cordillera (ARC)" was filed on March 20, 2017, during its first regular session and was supported by all House representatives from the Cordilleras. It was also the first time in history that all provincial and city governments throughout the Cordilleras supported Cordilleran autonomy. Currently, there are three pending Cordillera autonomy bills in the 18th Congress, House Bill No. 5687 filed by all Cordillera Congressmen, Senate Bill No. 1232 filed by Senator Migz Zubiri and House Bill No. 7778 filed by Benguet legislative caretaker Eric Yap of ACT-CIS Partylist.

A declaration to express support for the establishment of the Autonomous Region of the Cordillera (ARC) as part of the President Rodrigo Duterte-led process of shifting the form of governance of the Philippines from the presidential setup to federalism was signed on April 24, 2017, by about 200 local officials, tribal leaders, and civil society organizations at Mount Datu. There has also been a campaign to include Nueva Vizcaya into the Cordilleras, as the province is culturally and geographically part of the Cordilleras and not the Cagayan Valley.

== See also ==
- Autonomous regions of the Philippines
- Autonomous Region in Muslim Mindanao
- Bangsamoro
- Cordillera People's Liberation Army
- Federalism in the Philippines
