= Communist armed conflicts in the Philippines =

1942–present insurgencies in the Philippines

The history of communist armed conflicts in the Philippines is closely related to the history of Communism in the Philippines, with various armed conflict linked to the armed wings of the various communist organizations that have evolved since 1930. The two largest conflicts have been the Hukbalahap Rebellion of 1942–1954, and the ongoing rebellion of the New People's Army, which began in 1969 under the auspices of the Communist Party of the Philippines (CPP). But various splinter groups have since separated from the CPP and have had a history of armed conflict with the Philippine government since then.

The Hukbalahap Rebellion was initiated by the Partido Komunista ng Pilipinas of 1930 (PKP-1930) and its armed group the Hukbalahap (HMB) (Hukbong Mapagpalaya ng Bayan, or "People's Liberation Army"). They went into decline in the early 1950s and was finally put down through a series of reforms and military victories which led to the 1954 surrender of its leader Luis Taruc.

The armed conflict of the New People's Army against the Philippine government can be traced back to March 29, 1969, when Jose Maria Sison's newly formed CPP entered an alliance with a small armed group led by Bernabe Buscayno. But the conflict was still in its infancy in 1972 when Ferdinand Marcos proclaimed Martial law. The declaration and the resulting human rights abuses led to the radicalization of even the moderate opposition against Marcos, significantly swelling the ranks of the New People's Army.

Major splits away from the Communist Party of the Philippines occurred in 1992 and 1996. A month after Marcos was ousted through the broad-based nonviolent People Power Revolution of February 1986, the unit led by Conrado Balweg formed a splinter group known as the Cordillera People's Liberation Army, whose conflict with the Philippine government formally ended with the closure of peace talks in 2011. 1992 saw what the CPP refers to as the Second Great Rectification Movement, an effort whose stated intent was to "identify, repudiate and rectify the errors of urban insurrectionism, premature big formations of the New People's Army and anti-infiltration hysteria". This resulted in the once monolithic Filipino communist party fragmenting into at least 13 factions during the 1990s, the most notable being: the alliance that was the Revolutionary Workers' Party (RPM-P), the Revolutionary Proletarian Army (RPA), and the Alex Boncayao Brigade (ABB); the Revolutionary People's Army – Mindanao (RPA-M), and the Rebolusyonaryong Hukbong Bayan (RHB, Revolutionary People's Army) of the Marxist-Leninist Party of the Philippines (MLPP).

== Graphical timeline ==
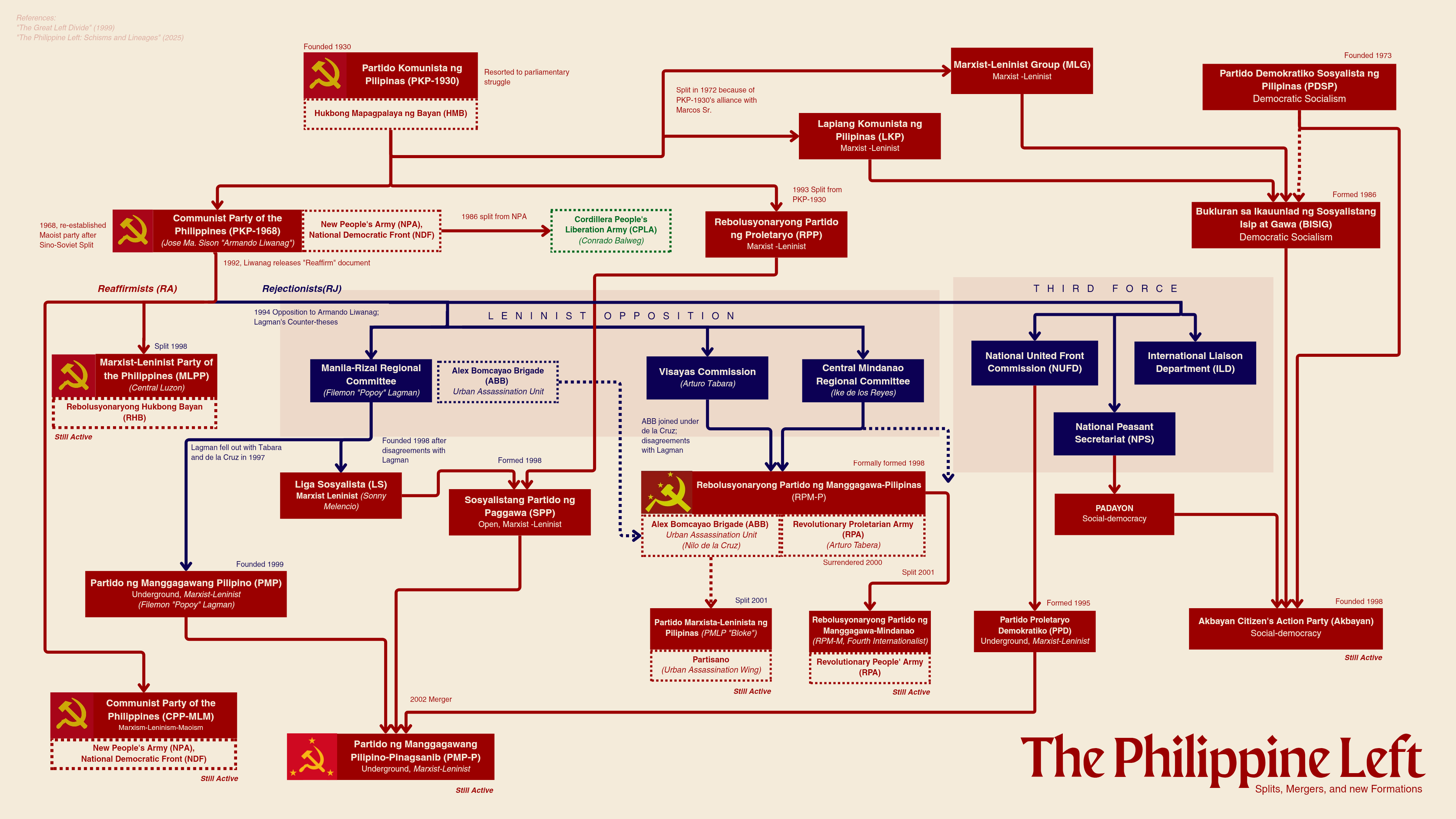
A flowchart illustrating the historical evolution, ideological splits, and organizational lineages of the communist movement in the Philippines.

== Hukbalahap rebellion (1942–1954) ==
The Hukbalahap rebellion began in 1942 when the Partido Komunista ng Pilipinas of 1930 (PKP-1930) formed an armed group called the Hukbo ng Bayan Laban sa Hapon (People's Army against the Japanese) to fight against the Japanese occupation of the Philippines during World War II. At the end of the war in 1946, the PKP-1930 reconstituted the Hukbalahap as the Hukbong Mapagpalaya ng Bayan ("Peoples' Liberation Army"), transforming it into the party's armed wing. This conflict ended in 1954 under the presidency of Ramon Magsaysay.

== New People's Army rebellion (1969–present) ==
The ongoing rebellion of the New People's Army began in 1969 under the auspices of the Communist Party of the Philippines (CPP), which had been formed the previous year.

This conflict was still in its infancy in 1972 when Ferdinand Marcos proclaimed Martial law, but expanded significantly as even the moderate opposition against Marcos was radicalized. The Partido Komunista ng Pilipinas (PKP), then allied with Ferdinand Marcos, was responsible for killing more communists than the Marcos government itself due to a growing youth faction within the party called the Marxist-Leninist Group (MLG) opposing Marcos' imposition of martial law nationwide and attempting to splinter from the PKP.

The CPP went through a series of setbacks and internal conflicts after the ouster of Ferdinand Marcos in 1986, including the breaking away of the Cordillera People's Liberation Army of former priest Conrado Balweg. CPP co-founder Jose Maria Sison went into exile in the Netherlands in 1987 while Benito Tiamzon reportedly became the leader of the party upon successively acquiring the positions of chairman and secretary general in 1986 and 1987 respectively.

In 1992 the CPP went through what it calls the Second Great Rectification Movement, whose stated intent was to "identify, repudiate and rectify the errors of urban insurrectionism, premature big formations of the New People's Army and anti-infiltration hysteria". This resulted in the split of the party into "Re-affirmist" and "Rejectionist" groups, resulting in the formation of at least 13 factions during the 1990s.

== Cordillera People's Liberation Army conflict (February–September 1986) ==
A month after Marcos was ousted through the broad-based nonviolent People Power Revolution of February 1986, the unit led by former priest Conrado Balweg broke away from the New People's Army, accusing the latter of incompetence in pursuing its goals. Balweg's splinter group became known as the Cordillera People's Liberation Army (CPLA). The formation of the CPLA also saw the merger of the Tingguian Liberation Force, a splinter group from NPA Abra to form the Cordillera organization. Their stated goal was to fight for the self-determination of the people of Cordillera.

The group began peace talks with the Philippine government later that year, and on September 13, 1986, the CPLA and the Government of the Philippines made a "sipat" (ceasefire) at Mt. Data Hotel, in Bauko, Mountain Province. The agreement between the two entities was called the 1986 Mount Data Peace Accord. The conflict formally ended with the closure of peace talks in 2011.

== 1992 Re-Affirmist/Rejectionist split ==
In 1992, main body of the CPP split into two factions: the reaffirmist faction led by Sison and the rejectionist faction which advocated the formation of larger military units and urban insurgencies. Several smaller factions emerged from the group, the most notable being the RPM/P-RPA-ABB; the MLPP-RHB, and the Rebolusyonaryong Partido ng Manggagawa Mindanao (Revolutionary Worker's Party - Mindanao - Revolutionary Peoples' Army, RWP-M/RPA, sometimes also RPA-M).

The split resulted in a weakening of the CPP-NPA, but it gradually grew again after the breakdown of peace talks in 1999, the unpopularity of the Estrada administration, and because of social pressures arising from the Asian Financial Crisis that year.

== Revolutionary Proletarian Army – Alex Boncayao Brigade conflict (1996–2000) ==
Due to the ideological split known as the Second Great Rectification Movement, the Negros Regional Party Committee of the New People's Army broke away from the Communist Party of the Philippines in 1996 and formed the Rebolusyonaryong Partido ng Manggagawà ng Pilipinas ("Revolutionary Workers' Party of the Philippines"). It organized its military arm two months after the split, calling it the Revolutionary Proletarian Army.

The Metro Manila-based urban assassination unit of the New People's Army, known as the Alex Boncayao Brigade (ABB; also known as the Sparrow Unit), also broke away from the New People's Army, and allied itself with the RPM-P and RPA in 1997.

In 1999, the group began peace negotiations with the government, leading to a peace deal which was signed in 2000.

== Marxist–Leninist Party of the Philippines armed conflict (1998–present) ==
In 1998, a group which operates mainly in Central Luzon broke away from the Communist Party of the Philippines, taking up a Marxist-Leninist ideology instead of the CPP's Marxism-Leninism-Maoism. This became the Marxist–Leninist Party of the Philippines which soon initiated conflict with the Philippine government through its armed wing, the Rebolusyonaryong Hukbong Bayan (RHB).

The conflict is still ongoing, although incidents covered in the media focus more on incidents arising from the rivalry between RHB and NPA.

== Revolutionary Workers' Party in Mindanao (2000–ongoing peace talks) ==
Breaking away from the Communist Party of the Philippines during the 1992 split, the group which called itself the CMR (Central Mindanao Region) Rejectionist Group initially joined other rejectionist factions from elsewhere in the country. During peace negotiations with the Estrada administration, however, they split from the other groups and formed the Rebolusyonaryong Partido ng Manggagawa sa Mindanao (RPM-M, lit. Revolutionary Workers’ Party in Mindanao). The group quietly began peace negotiations with the Philippine Government in 2003.
