= Conrado Balweg =

Filipino priest and rebel

- Born: December 29, 1942; Commonwealth of the Philippines
- Died: December 31, 1999 (aged 57); Malibcong, Abra, Philippines
- Spouse: Corazon Cortel
- Children: 5

Ecclesiastical career
- Religion: Catholicism
- Ordained: November 27, 1970; Pope Paul VI
- Congregations: Society of the Divine Word
- Military career
- Allegiance: New People's Army (1979–1986); Cordillera People’s Liberation Army (1986–1999)
- Nickname: Ka Ambo
- Unit: Lumbaya Company (NPA)

Conrado M. Balweg (December 29, 1942 – December 31, 1999) was a former Filipino Catholic priest and rebel who was the founder of the Cordillera People's Liberation Army, a militant group which advocated autonomy for the Cordillera region in the Philippines. He was also known by the nom-de-guerre Ka Ambo.

== Life ==
=== Early and personal life ===
Balweg was born on December 29, 1942, in Buanao, (present-day) Malibcong. He was a member of the Tingguian tribe; and came from a wealthy family in northern Abra. He had four brothers and three sisters.

His younger brother Jovencio (Note: Jovencio was also known variously as "Ka Rudy", "Ka Bencio", "Ka Adel", and "Ka Dawa".) was the municipal secretary of Malibcong by 1970s until joining him in the communist Cordillera People's Democratic Front (CPDF) of the New People's Army (NPA) in 1979. By early 1998, he was a top cadre of the CPDF in Abra. He held several key positions in the Communist Party of the Philippines–New People's Army (CPP–NPA) hierarchy in the Ilocos and Cordillera regions, notably being a ranking member of the executive committee of the area's Regional Party Committee. (Note: Jovencio was also an alternate secretary of the provincial education committee; commanding officer of the Provincial Army committee (at the time of Conrado's death); and political officer of the NPA's Provincial Operational Command (at the time he was arrested, 2009).) He left the NPA upon his arrest in 2009. In 2016 elections, he won a seat at the Malibcong municipal council.

Balweg was married to Corazon Cortel; with whom he had six children. Upon Balweg's death, Cortel became the chief of staff of the Cordillera People's Liberation Army (CPLA). She died of cardiac arrest at Camp Upi in Gamu, Isabela, on March 10, 2008.

In 2012, one of his children, a CPLA member, was integrated into the Philippine Army.

=== Life as a priest ===
Three Balweg brothers entered the Society of the Divine Word (SVD) congregation, but only Conrado was ordained a priest by Pope Paul VI during the latter's pastoral visit to Manila in 1970. He became the parish priest of Luba, Tubo and Sallapadan. In the early years, he combined Catholic mass with Tingguian rituals.

==== CRC issue ====
Later, Balweg, along with fellow tingguian priests, brothers Cirilo and Bruno Ortega (SVD), led the Tingguians in their opposition to a project by the Cellophil Resources Corporation (CRC), which was planning to establish a rayon plant in Tayum, to retain their ancestral lands. CRC was granted the largest logging concession by the national government under president Ferdinand Marcos in 1973–74 for its paper project; and threatened to affect over 200,000 hectares of forest land in Abra, the present-day Kalinga, and Mountain Province, as well as much of ancestral land. CRC began a massive logging operation in Abra in 1972, displacing Tingguians from their ancestral lands in the forest.

Meanwhile, CRC, being "the primary issue" involving Tingguians, among other development projects in the 1970s including the Chico River Dam Project, contributed to the increase of strength of the communist NPA in Cordillera mountains in northern Luzon, as well as its support from the displaced Igorot people. The leftist group first appeared in the area in 1976.

As a result of their activities, Balweg was accused of being an NPA sympathizer. The struggle involving CRC later drove Tingguians to join the NPA. After receiving death threats, and to protest what he believed was repression and land-grabbing under the Marcos presidency, as well as to defend his tribe against loggers and further denudation of the forest, in 1979, he left the rectory, fled to the hills, and joined the said communist group. (Note: A 1985 news report by Associated Press stated that Balweg joined the rebels in January 1980.) Such involvement resulted to his expulsion from the SVD where at the time, there was reportedly a split among Filipino and foreign priests. However, in 1984, Balweg claimed being on leave from SVD, as his colleagues in Manila still consider him a priest.

=== Revolutionary career ===
==== With the NPA ====
In the first interview with NPA members, aired on a government television station on April 18, 1986, Balweg said he would not join the NPA if the Church in the province had responded to human rights abuses against the tribals.

Balweg was later inspired by the heroism of tribal leader Macli-ing Dulag, one of the leaders of the Igorots opposing the government's Chico River Dam Project, a planned hydroelectric dam in the Cordilleras—a predominantly tribal region. Dulag was assassinated in 1980.

Balweg, the Ortegas, and Nilo Valerio, from being Roman Catholic priests, eventually became members of NPA, particularly the CPDF, hence they were called "rebel priests." Balweg, belonged to the Lumbaya Company, adopted the nom de guerre "Ka Ambo". (Note: Other source stated that Conrado had also aliases "Ka Dado" and "Ka Primo".) He was the CPP spokesperson in the Cordillera in the early 1980s. He fought in the Cordillera mountain range until the 1986 People Power Revolution.

Balweg, upon joining the Cordillera guerrillas, had 32 fighters, which were believed to have grown to up to 700 by mid-1984. He claimed 99% of the recruits were from mountain villages. In 1984, a military operation composed of a 1,000-member team was launched against them.

Balweg had strongholds in the present-day Kalinga. Efforts to negotiate his surrender became difficult. By mid-1983, the Armed Forces of the Philippines offered ₱200,000 (Note: Equivalent to US$11,111 by 1984; US$10,260 by mid-1986; and probably $6,350 by late 1986.) for his neutralization as he had been tagged as its most wanted. The bounty was lifted by defense minister Juan Ponce Enrile on June 19, 1986.

==== CPLA ====
President Corazon Aquino, since the beginning of her tenure in 1986, offered reconciliation with the communists. Meanwhile, Balweg led the advocacy for the autonomy for the Cordillera people.

In April 1986, Balweg, along with Bruno Ortega, and his CPDF's Lumbaya Company, broke away from the CPP–NPA and formed the CPLA, which would be headed by him. They were joined later by some cadres, particularly in present-day Kalinga and Abra. Balweg, citing disagreement with other commanders, alleged that the NPA had ignored the plight of the Cordilleras, and that their ideology was inappropriate. The split weakened the CPP-NPA in the region.

Balweg revealed in an exclusive media interview that he was opting for a legal or open struggle rather than armed struggle while the latter was effective. Since as early as June, there were meetings and peace talks between Balweg's group and the government panel, including president Aquino and negotiator Butz Aquino (her brother-in-law), in the Cordillera mountains, in an attempt to resolve problems regarding insurgency. Discussed were plans for a ceasefire and proposed autonomy for the tribal Cordillera region.

In September, president Aquino recognized Balweg as chief spokesperson for the Cordillera area. On September 13, in a hotel atop Mount Data in Bauko, Mountain Province, the Aquino government, the CPLA, and the Cordillera People's Administration, forged the Mount Data Peace Accord, the first peace agreement granting autonomy for Igorot tribesmen, covering the five provinces that would make up the tribal Cordillera mountain region—the first step in reaching a lasting peace with the government. In a traditional ceremony known as a sipat that ended hostilities, Balweg and Aquino, with defense secretary Enrile, exchanged tokens. This paved the way for Executive Order No. 220 in 1987, creating the Cordillera Administrative Region (CAR), integrating Cordillera rebels with the police and the military in anti-communist operations, and calling for the creation of a regional security force.

President Aquino later decided against his appointment as the executive director of the CAR due to opposition from various groups. During the presidency of Joseph Estrada, Balweg, with then Executive Secretary Ronaldo Zamora, chaired a committee created to discuss the autonomy for the Cordilleras.

Balweg later envisioned the establishment of the Cordillera Universal Peace Center in Banaue, Ifugao, "as a contribution of all indigenous peoples of the world to the pursuit of universal peace and harmony."

===== Status of Balweg's campaigns =====
For the 1987 plebiscite, Balweg supported the ratification of the constitution which included a provision calling for the creation of autonomous regions for both minority tribes in Luzon and the Muslims in the country's south. Such provision on the regional autonomy was likewise promoted by highlander organizations including CPLA. However, it was rejected by a majority of voters in two separate plebiscites. Balweg was among those supported the autonomy in 1990; but decided to campaign against it in 1998, causing his ouster as CPLA head.

Meanwhile, Balweg and other CPLA leaders were in favor of the proposed regional security force, which was never materialized as CPLA members became part of the Civilian Armed Forces Geographical Unit (CAFGU), the countrywide auxiliary force. They opposed the integration into the military, creating internal rifts within the CPLA. On August 3, 2001, president Gloria Arroyo signed Administrative Order 18 providing for the integration of 1,200 CPLA members as officers, enlisted personnel, and CAFGU Active Auxiliaries. Since then, a number of CPLA members, mostly new recruits, joined either of these.

Balweg's wife, in her later years, supervised livelihood projects for cooperatives of former CPLA members, and the integration of others to the Philippine Army.

Since the 1986 sipat, isolated indigenous communities in the Cordillera had become more peaceful (while political violence is extreme in Abra). CPLA, despite setbacks, never again involved in conflict against the state; while their political exposure declined. Moreover, an effort to unify the factions eventually failed.

Since the effectivity of EO No. 220, the CAR's annual appropriation has been reduced. At the time of presidency of Rodrigo Duterte, Balweg's brother Jovencio was leading those still seeking the implementation of the 1986 agreement. Balweg's remaining brothers and former CPLA members still wanted the autonomy for the Cordillerans over Duterte's proposed federalism if it would be acceptable to them.

==== Rivalry between NPA and CPLA ====
In June 1986, an eight-day meeting between Balweg and the NPA resolved some of their differences and they "agreed to be military allies and forge tighter unity."

Nevertheless, Balweg, since leaving the NPA, was publicly renounced by the group for his abandonment of the latter's cause. NPA claimed expelling Balweg for misusing funds and womanizing; and later accused him of stealing firearms, abduction, killing, and treason after forming the CPLA. An execution order for him was issued in 1987.

The CPLA had been regarded by some groups as an anti-communist vigilante due to their cooperation with the military's anti-NPA operations. It had also been accused by groups in the region of "misrepresenting the Cordillera people" and of powergrabbing, and had been racked by defections by two ranking leaders protesting "Balweg's dictatorial ways."

On the other hand, the split among the rebels later restrained relationship among the Balweg brothers. In a media interview in 1998, Jovencio, who had not met Conrado since 1986, said the latter has long betrayed the Tingguians, and criticized a radio interview by the latter who said that political leaders should be educated.

=== 1987 ambush on Balweg and death of Ngaya-an ===
On June 21, 1987, Balweg managed to escape an ambush on his two-jeep convoy on a mountainous dirt road in Licuan-Baay where eight of his followers were killed and another is injured as the leading vehicle was shot.

The military had since blamed the attack on the NPA, while Balweg accused his brother Jovencio of leading a CPDF force in the incident.

On October 5, Daniel Ngaya-an, chairman of tribal organization Cordillera Bodong Association (CBA), was abducted by CPLA members at the latter's checkpoint at Pasil, Kalinga-Apayao, and later detained at the nearby CPLA headquarters. He was reportedly killed; his body was later found. (Note: Records from the Supreme Court suggest that Daniel Ngaya-an has been missing; and that Balweg, in a radio interview, hinted that he might be killed by the CPLA.) Ngaya-an, Kalinga tribal leader, was supposed to help negotiate peace pacts among tribes in Lubuagan.

Balweg admitted in a radio interview that the CPLA is responsible for Ngaya-an's disappearance. He later confessed to a retaliatory killing—"a moral and logical answer to Ngayaan's open crime" against CPLA—in his statement, while saying that the June attack was a declaration of war against the CPLA. In response, Jovencio, then with the NPA's Abra province command, said the CPLA were mistaken for the military and became a target of the attack.

In 1989, the Supreme Court issued an arrest order for Balweg and his aide for their refusal to answer charges in the killing; the order was lifted after two months. The petition for habeas corpus, filed in behalf of Ngaya-an against Balweg, was dismissed in 1991.

=== Attempt in politics ===
In 1998, Balweg lost to Abra provincial governor Atty. Vicente Valera in a bid for a legislative seat to represent the province's lone district. During the election campaign, the two accused each other of harassing the voters. It was believed that Balweg's loss was due to perceptions that he might rule the province through his militia.

At the time of his death, Balweg was reportedly preparing to resume his attempt to enter politics through the 2001 elections. At that time, he belonged to Lapian ng Masang Pilipino of president Joseph Estrada.

== Death ==
=== Events leading to his assassination ===
Balweg reportedly prepared a letter addressed to president Estrada regarding peace efforts in Abra, which would be delivered in case something happened to him in Malibcong.

On Balweg's birthday in 1999, his family visited their ancestral house in Malibcong. The following day, he and Jovencio met the whole day to discuss their ideological differences.

Meanwhile, a death sentence for Balweg was read by the hastily-formed kangaroo court inside the residence where Balwegs gathered for a family reunion. Balweg was shot to death at 4 a.m. of December 31, 1999, by a lone NPA assassin at his residence. Four shots were heard; he sustained two gunshot wounds.

The NPA Chadli Molintas Command in the Cordillera, present in the time of the incident, admitted responsibility for the murder. The NPA said in a statement that they executed Balweg for his "crimes against the [Cordillera] people and the revolutionary movement." NPA also alleged that he collected money from the government and private companies. CPP founder Jose Maria Sison said that the killing was long overdue. The leaders of CBA and CPLA condemned the killing.

His wish to be cremated was not granted by Tingguian elders, and he was buried instead in the public cemetery in Bangued on January 8, 2000, which was attended by 2,000 members and supporters of the CPLA. Though some local politicians expressed their condolences, none of the key political figures appeared on his interment.

=== Suspects ===
The police initially reported that Jovencio was the suspect. However, Jovencio, who had been leading the command involved in the killing, (Note: At the time of Conrado's death, Jovencio was reported the leader of the NPA's Chadli Molintas Command. Another source stated that he led the Agustin Begnalen Command.) later denied firing the bullets that killed his brother.

Police later found Procopio Tauro (Note: Procopio Tauro was also known variously as "Ka Pyro" and "Ka Lito".) to be directly responsible for killing Balweg. Tauro, NPA Sandatahang Yunit Pampropaganda team leader, was the one who reportedly convened the kangaroo court. It was reported that Tauro shot Balweg, allegedly on orders of Jovencio; and the two were with other NPA rebels present at that time.

On January 4, 2000, Jovencio, Tauro, and four other companions (Note: Florece Baluga, Maco Guinnay, Marcelo Dao-ayan, & Lito Laguicao. Dao-ayan was killed in an encounter with the police in Buguias, Benguet, in 2005. The fate of other co-accused are uncertain.) (along with several John Does), were charged in court with murder. Likewise, at least 13 non-government organization and church workers, and activist leaders in the Ilocos Region were implicated. More than eight were arrested, including three pastors of the United Church of Christ in the Philippines. Five cases were filed before the Bangued Regional Trial Court (RTC); by September 2007, all of these were dismissed for lack of evidence.

On May 18, 2009, Jovencio, along with his wife, was captured in Baguio. All criminal cases against him, including his involvement in his brother's death, were dismissed, and he was freed from detention after being ordered by the Bangued RTC on July 19, 2011.

In October 2010, Tauro was killed in a gun battle with the military while leading an attack in Licuan-Baay.

== In popular culture ==
Balweg's life as a priest-turned-rebel was the subject of the 1987 biopic Balweg: Rebel Priest, directed by Butch Perez, with Phillip Salvador playing the lead role.
