= Mt. Data Hotel =

Hotel in Mountain Province, Philippines

- Interactive map of the Mt. Data Hotel area
- Alternative names: Mount Data Hotel

General information
- Status: Completed
- Location: Bauko, Mountain Province, Philippines
- Coordinates: 16°51′09″N 120°51′48″E
- Operator: Tourism Infrastructure and Enterprise Zone Authority

Other information
- Number of rooms: 22

The Mount Data Hotel is a hotel in Bauko, Mountain Province, Philippines, noted in Philippine History as the venue of the signing of the Mount Data peace accord which ended hostilities between the Philippine Government and the Cordillera People's Liberation Army - an event that was a major contributor to the establishment of the Cordillera Administrative Region.

The hotel was closed in 2005 and reopened in 2022, under the administration of the Philippines' Tourism Infrastructure and Enterprise Zone Authority.

== History ==
Mt. Data Hotel was built by the Philippine Tourism Authority (PTA) during the administration of then President Diosdado Macapagal in order to encourage tourism in the Mountain Province, as well as the central Cordillera region.

The hotel became known as the venue of the signing of the Mount Data Peace Accord or sipat on September 13, 1986, which ended hostilities between the Philippine national government represented by then President Corazon Aquino and the Cordillera People's Liberation Army led by Conrado Balweg. The peace deal led to the establishment of the Cordillera Administrative Region.

The PTA closed the hotel in February 2005, but later transferred the management of the hotel to the Mountain Province government in 2006 and tasked the provincial government to renovate the hotel's facilities and find a suitable entity to manage the hotel in ten years. The Mountain Province operated the hotel for ten years but failed to fulfill provisions of its deal to renovate the hotel.

Administration reverted to the Tourism Infrastructure and Enterprise Zone Authority (TIEZA, which was formerly the PTA) in February 2016. A renovation was planned but the hotel was temporarily closed due to delays on the implementation of the renovation. TIEZA began renovation on the hotel in early 2020, with plans to reopen the hotel within the latter part of the same year.

== Facilities ==
In 2017, Mt. Data Hotel had 22 rooms.
