= PSGC =

PSGC may refer to:

- Philippine Standard Geographic Code, a system of dividing geographical area of the Philippines
- PSGC Ciamis, an Indonesian football club
- Puget Sound Governmental Conference, the former name of the Puget Sound Regional Council in the US
