= Autonomous regions of the Philippines =

First-level administrative divisions

- Bangsamoro, the only extant autonomous region in the Philippines
- Category: Autonomous region
- Location: Philippines
- Number: 1 (as of 2019)
- Government: Parliament
- Subdivisions: Provinces and cities

An autonomous region of the Philippines (Filipino: rehiyong awtonomo ng Pilipinas) is a first-level administrative division with the authority to control a region's culture and economy. The Constitution of the Philippines allows for two autonomous regions: in the Cordilleras and in Muslim Mindanao.

Currently, Bangsamoro, which largely consists of Muslim-majority areas in Mindanao, is the only autonomous region in the country.

== Current autonomous region ==
=== Bangsamoro ===
On October 15, 2012, a preliminary peace agreement was signed between the Government of the Philippines and the Moro Islamic Liberation Front (MILF), represented by chief negotiator Marvic Leonen and MILF Peace Panel Chair Mohagher Iqbal, with the participation of Malaysian facilitator Tengku Dato' Ab Ghafar Tengku Mohamed. The signing was witnessed by President Benigno Aquino III, Malaysian Prime Minister Najib Razak, MILF chairman Murad Ebrahim, and Organisation of Islamic Cooperation Secretary-General Ekmeleddin İhsanoğlu, among others.

It replaced the Autonomous Region in Muslim Mindanao (ARMM) after voters ratified Republic Act No. 11054, or the Bangsamoro Organic Law, in a 2019 plebiscite held on January 21 and February 6 in selected areas. The ratification was announced on January 25, 2019, by the Commission on Elections.

On September 9, 2024, the Supreme Court of the Philippines upheld the Bangsamoro Organic Law but ruled unconstitutional the provision treating all provinces of the former ARMM as a single unit for ratification purposes. Because the majority of voters in Sulu rejected the law in the 2019 plebiscite, the province was declared not part of the BARMM.

== Former autonomous regions ==
=== Autonomous Region in Muslim Mindanao ===

The Autonomous Region in Muslim Mindanao (ARMM) was created on August 1, 1989, through Republic Act No. 6734 pursuant to a constitutional mandate. In 2012, President Benigno Aquino III described ARMM as a "failed experiment" and supported its replacement with a new autonomous political entity under a peace agreement with the MILF.

A plebiscite was held in several provinces and cities across Mindanao and Palawan to determine inclusion in the ARMM. Of these areas, only four provinces (Lanao del Sur, Maguindanao, Sulu, and Tawi-Tawi) voted in favor of inclusion. The ARMM was formally inaugurated on November 6, 1990, in Cotabato City.

The ARMM ceased to exist after the 2019 plebiscite that ratified the Bangsamoro Organic Law, and was replaced by the Bangsamoro Autonomous Region in Muslim Mindanao (BARMM) under the Bangsamoro Transition Authority.

=== Western Mindanao and Central Mindanao ===
Prior to the ARMM, two autonomous regions existed in Mindanao: Western Mindanao (Region IX) and Central Mindanao (Region XII), each governed by a Lupong Tagapagpaganap ng Pook (LTP) led by a chairman.

== Proposed autonomous regions ==
=== Cordilleras ===
The Cordillera Administrative Region administers the area designated for a proposed autonomous region. Two plebiscites have been held in the Cordilleras to create an autonomous region, the most recent in 1998, but both failed. Several bills have been filed in Congress to establish an autonomous region in the Cordilleras, but none have been enacted.

In 1990, a plebiscite was held to create an autonomous region under Republic Act No. 6766, but only Ifugao voted in favor of ratification. The provinces comprising the Cordillera Administrative Region at the time, as well as the city of Baguio, participated in the plebiscite, with only those localities voting in favor of ratification to form part of the proposed autonomous region. As a result, the attempt to establish an autonomous region consisting of a single province failed.

=== In Southern Philippines ===
In the 1977 Southern Philippines autonomy plebiscite, voters in Palawan and selected areas in Mindanao, were asked whether the two regions should be merged into a single autonomous region. The proposal was rejected.

=== In the Sulu Archipelago ===
A separate autonomous region for the Sulu Archipelago has been proposed under the names Bangsa Sug, and the Basulta Autonomous Region.

In November 2024, Senator Robin Padilla filed Senate Bill No. 2879, which sought to create the Basulta Autonomous Region comprising the provinces of Basilan, Sulu, and Tawi-Tawi. The proposal followed a Supreme Court decision excluding Sulu from the Bangsamoro Autonomous Region in Muslim Mindanao.

The proposal was opposed by the League of Bangsamoro Organizations (LBO), which described the measure as "divisive and disruptive".

=== Metro Manila ===
Former Quezon City Mayor Herbert Bautista proposed converting the National Capital Region (Metro Manila) into an autonomous region as an alternative to President Rodrigo Duterte's federalism campaign, under which Metro Manila would become a federal state within the Philippines.

Metro Manila is composed of 16 highly urbanized cities and the independent municipality of Pateros, with the Metropolitan Manila Development Authority serving as a coordinating body for the region's local government units.

== See also ==
- Bangsamoro Juridical Entity
- Administrative regions of the Philippines
- Provinces of the Philippines
