= Kalinga-Apayao =

Filipino province (1966–1995)

Coordinates: 18°04′N 121°12′E

- Province of the Philippines
- 1966-1995
- Flag Seal

- Location of the historical province of Kalinga-Apayao.
- Capital: Tabuk
- Area
- 7,048.1 km^{2} (2,721.3 sq mi)
- History
  - Established: June 18, 1966
  - Disestablished: May 8, 1995
- Political subdivisions: 15 (before May 8, 1995)
Preceded by	Succeeded by
Mountain Province	Apayao; Kalinga
- Today part of: · Apayao · Kalinga

Kalinga-Apayao (IPA: [kaliŋɡa apajaw]) was a province of the Philippines in the Cordillera Administrative Region. It was formed, along with Benguet, Ifugao, and the new Mountain Province, from the earlier Mountain Province, with the passage of Republic Act No. 4695 in 1966. The said law was amended by Republic Act No. 7878 in 1995, which partitioned the province into modern Kalinga and Apayao.

A popular myth stated that Former President Ferdinand Marcos made gradual changes to the borders of Kalinga-Apayao over the course of his dictatorship, with the aim of making the outline of the province on a map resemble the silhouette of his own head facing towards his own native Ilocos Norte. The "Great Profile" remained unfinished when Marcos was overthrown in 1986. However, these claims are mostly false and the border was part of the traces of the borders of the pre-1966 Mountain Province.

== History ==
=== Before Mountain Province ===
Prior to the establishment of the province, the sub-provinces of Kalinga and Apayao, upon their establishment through Act No. 1642 in 1907, were used to be part of Lepanto-Bontoc (as Kalinga was taken from Cagayan and Isabela) and Cagayan provinces respectively. The sub-provinces were annexed into the Mountain Province which was established through Act No. 1876 in 1908.

In the early years, the sub-provinces underwent series of territorial changes:

- Part of Kalinga was transferred to another sub-province Bontoc (Executive Order 53, 1914); same as part of Apayao to the province of Ilocos Norte (EO 21, 1920).
- 1922: In Apayao, a barrio of municipal district of Bayag (Calanasan) to Namaltugan.
- 1926: In Kalinga, barrios in municipal district of Pinukpuk to Balbalan.
- 1927: Parts of the municipal district of Pinukpuk in Kalinga to Conner in Apayao.

=== As sub-provinces of Mountain Province ===
The sub-provinces became part of Kalinga-Apayao which was created along with three other new provinces comprising the old Mountain Province through Republic Act 4695 on June 18, 1966. Those provinces, with Abra, would become part of the Cordillera Administrative Region, created through EO 220 on July 15, 1987.

Since the creation of the sub-provinces, Tabuc (Tabuk) was designated as the capital of Kalinga. In Apayao, its first sub-provincial capital was Tauit until mid-1915, when it was moved to Kabugao via EO 45.

=== During the Marcos dictatorship ===
The beginning months of the 1970s marked a period of turmoil and change in the Philippines, as well as in Kalinga-Apayao. During his bid to be the first Philippine president to be re-elected for a second term, Ferdinand Marcos launched an unprecedented number of public works projects. This caused the Philippine economy took a sudden downwards turn known as the 1969 Philippine balance of payments crisis, which in turn led to a period of economic difficulty and social unrest.

With only a year left in his last constitutionally allowed term as president Ferdinand Marcos placed the Philippines under martial law in September 1972 and thus retained the position for fourteen more years. This period in Philippine history is remembered for the Marcos administration's record of human rights abuses, particularly targeting political opponents, student activists, journalists, religious workers, farmers, and others who fought against the Marcos dictatorship. The Kalinga-Apayao became known as a flashpoint of conflict between the Marcos dictatorship and the various indigenous peoples who lived in the area, because of the Chico River Dam Project, which, even if only the most essential part of it were built, would have encompassed the municipalities of Tinglayan, Lubuagan, Pasil, and parts of Tabuk in Kalinga Province, as well as numerous municipalities in Mountain Province; and would have displaced about 100,000 indigenous people. Because the great value placed on deceased ancestors who were buried within these communities, the issue was not just one of livelihood, but also one of sacred grounds. Marcos sent three armed brigades to quell down the protests, resulting in heightened tensions in the area. In 1977 alone, numerous Kalinga dam protesters — including tribal leaders Lumbaya Aliga Gayudan and Macli-ing Dulag, and even a 12-year-old child — were rounded up by these forces and incarcerated for up to two months.

The April 24, 1980 murder of Macli-ing Dulag became a turning point when coverage of the murder led to public outrage. It was the first time since the 1972 declaration of Martial Law where the mainstream Philippine press managed to report on the arrests of civilians under martial law, and the turn of public opinion against both the Chico River Dam and Martial law, coupled with the united anger of the various peoples of the Cordillera Mountains led the Ferdinand Marcos administration to give up on the dam project. As a result, the Chico River Dam Project is now considered a landmark case study concerning ancestral domain issues in the Philippines.

=== After the People Power Revolution ===
After Marcos was finally deposed by the civilian-led People Power Revolution in 1986, many of the activists who had joined the underground movement decided to "surface," as the new administration of Corazon Aquino released political prisoners and initiated peace talks. However, anti-left sentiment in Aquino's new cabinet, which included figures who had sided with the Reform the Armed Forces Movement, made the peace process difficult, and negotiations eventually collapsed, and the insurgency in Kalinga-Apayao persisted. By December 1988, 52% of the barangays in the province were controlled by the New People's Army communist insurgent group while 43% are "under its influence" according to the House of Representatives Committee on National Defense.

Another event in 1986 marked the beginning of political change in the region, however - the splitting of the Cordillera People's Liberation Army from the New People's Army. Former Catholic priest Conrado Balweg, who had left his calling and joined the NPA in 1979, had been having disagreements with the NPA leadership over tactics and objectives in the Cordillera for four years when he finally decided to split from the NPA in early April 1986, believing that Igorot interests were better served through regional struggles for liberation, rather than the national-scale conflict pursued by the NPA.

=== Peace accord and creation of the Cordillera Autonomous Region ===
In September 1986, the CPLA signed the Mount Data Peace Accord with the government, which led to the creation of what became called the Cordillera Autonomous Region, although attempts to ratify actual autonomy in the region have failed due to non-ratification during plebiscites. On November 19, 1986, former KBL assemblyman David Puzon of Kalinga-Apayao was assassinated in San Jose del Monte, Bulacan along with his driver and a business associate by six armed men disguised in women's clothing; Puzon's daughter-in-law Evangeline was injured but managed to survive the incident. National Democratic Front spokesman Satur Ocampo soon expressed his view that the New People's Army was likely behind the assassination.

Having later been divided into two new provinces, Kalinga and Apayao were separately declared insurgency-free in 2010: Apayao in February, Kalinga in November.

=== Abolition and partition ===
By virtue of Republic Act. No 7878, signed on February 14, 1995, the sub-provinces in Kalinga-Apayao were partitioned into two new provinces, Kalinga and Apayao, with their capitals remaining as before. Both comprise the same municipalities formerly part of these sub-provinces.

A majority of voters in Kalinga-Apayao ratified the law in a plebiscite on May 8, 1995.

1995 plebiscite on the separation of Kalinga and Apayao
Choice	Votes	%
For	75,051	96.15
Against	3,008	3.85
Total	78,059	100.00
Source: Memorandum Order No. 290, s. 1995

== Administrative divisions ==
Municipalities in Kalinga and Apayao sub-provinces before 1995
Duration	Kalinga	Apayao
1907–1966	Then municipal districts by 1917: Balbalan; Lubuagan; Pinukpuk; Tabuk (sub-provincial capital, 1907–1966; provincial capital, 1966–1995); Later created, as municipal districts: Tanudan (Note: Created as a municipal district in 1932 through an executive order, taken from Lubuagan.); Tinglayan (Note: Later created as a municipal district prior to becoming a regular municipality in 1963.); Quirino (Note: Created in 1964 via EO 111, later abolished and reverted to Balbalan and Pinukpuk before 1980.); as municipality: Rizal (Note: Created in 1965 as Liwan via RA 4396, renamed in 1971 via RA 6184, taken from Tabuk.)	Then municipal districts by 1917: Calanasan (Note: Formerly Bayag, renamed in 1967 via RA 4980.); Conner; Kabugao (sub-provincial capital, 1915–1995); Later created, as municipal districts: Luna (Note: Created in 1929 as municipal district of Macatel via EO 200, later renamed through a resolution, taken from Tauit.); Pudtol (Note: Created in 1956 via EO 217, taken from Luna.); as municipality: Flora (Note: Created in 1963 via RA 3672, taken from Pudtol.); Former municipal districts: Tauit (Note: Abolished in 1936 via EO 13, annexed to Luna. At present, it also comprises parts of the municipalities of Flora, Pudtol, Sta. Marcela, as well as Allacapan (separated from this municipal district and organized into a new one in 1927 via EO 68) and Lasam in the province of Cagayan.) (sub-provincial capital, 1907–1915); Namaltugan (Note: Abolished in 1936 via EO 78, annexed to present-day Calanasan and Kabugao.)
1966–1995	Created: Pasil (Note: Created in 1966, same day as establishment of Kalinga-Apayao, via RA 4741, taken from Balbalan and Lubuagan.) Abolished: Quirino	Created: Santa Marcela (Note: Created on June 17, 1967 via RA 4974, taken from Flora and Luna.)
All municipal districts had been converted into regular municipalities prior to the establishment of the province in 1966.

By the time Kalinga-Apayao was established, eight municipalities remained part of the subprovince of Kalinga, while six municipalities remained part of the subprovince of Apayao.

Within almost three decades, two new municipalities were created. On the same day as the creation of the province, Pasil in Kalinga was created through Republic Act No. 4741; Santa Marcela in Apayao was created in 1967 through Republic Act No. 4974. Meanwhile, the municipality of Quirino in Kalinga, which had been established earlier, was abolished sometime between 1975 and 1980. Before the division in 1995, the province had 15 municipalities and 283 barangays.
