= 1990 Cordillera autonomy plebiscite =

1990 Cordillera Autonomous Region creation plebiscite
- January 30, 1990
- Outcome: Autonomy rejected in Baguio and all provinces save for Ifugao; Measure ratified in Ifugao and creation of Cordillera Autonomous Region; Creation of Cordillera Autonomous Region ruled as unconstitutional by the Supreme Court, Ifugao reverted to being a component of the Cordillera Administrative Region
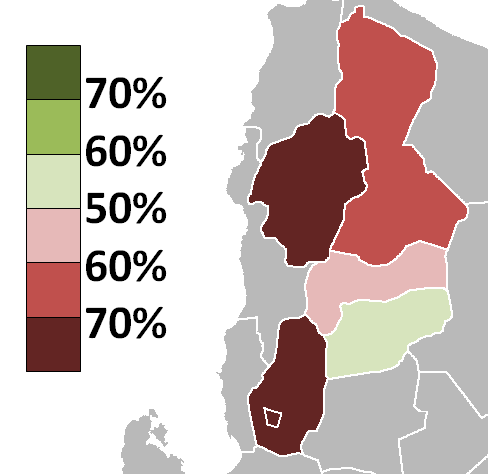
- Results by province (and city of Baguio)
- On the map, the darker shades of a color indicate a larger majority for (green shades) or against (red shades) autonomy.

A plebiscite for the ratification of the organic act creating the Cordillera Autonomous Region was held on January 30, 1990, to ask if the voters in the Cordillera Administrative Region wanted to be an autonomous region under Republic Act No. 6766. The Cordillera Administrative Region (CAR) consists of the provinces of Abra, Benguet, Ifugao, Kalinga-Apayao, and Mountain Province, and the city of Baguio. Only Ifugao voted in favor of autonomy, and a Supreme Court case later disallowed the creation of an autonomous region with just one province.

This was the first attempt by the Cordillera autonomy movement to create an autonomous region after years of conflict by the Cordillera People's Liberation Army. A second plebiscite in 1998 resulted in Apayao (by then separated from Kalinga) voting for autonomy, and an establishment of an autonomous region still failed.

== Background ==
A plebiscite was held concerning the establishment of an autonomous region in the Cordilleras on January 30, 1990, via ratification of Republic Act No. 6766, otherwise known as "An Act Providing for an Organic Act for the Cordillera Autonomous Region". Voters registered in the component localities of the Cordillera Administrative Region (provinces of Abra, Benguet, Ifugao, Kalinga-Apayao, and Mountain Province, and the highly urbanized city of Baguio, which is not included in any province) participating in the vote. As per law, only provinces (and Baguio) which voted in favor of the ratification of the law would constitute part of the new Cordillera Autonomous Region.

== Campaign ==
In the run-up to the plebiscite, the Baguio City Council and the Benguet Provincial Board both voted for the exclusion of their localities from the autonomous region due to what they described as "lopsided" tax-sharing system, where both Baguio and Benguet, the most prosperous places in the would-be autonomous region, be subsidizing the rest of the region.

Conrado Balweg's group campaigned for a "no" vote in the plebiscite. Balweg said that the organic act is "a bogus law because what we fought for is not there."

== Results ==
Initial results showed voters in five provinces and in Baguio rejecting autonomy, with only Ifugao favoring inclusion. Vice President Salvador Laurel, who earlier predicted the rejection of the measure, said that the government should seriously consider switching to a federal system, and that it, and the earlier rejection of autonomy in a Mindanao plebiscite is a significant victory for the Nacionalista Party.

The Commission on Elections (COMELEC) declared on February 14, 1990, that the plebiscite failed in Baguio and in all provinces except Ifugao. With the rejection being apparent, it was suggested to bring the question if establishing the Cordillera Autonomous Region with Ifugao as its sole component province to the COMELEC. According to Senator Aquilino Pimentel Jr., the rejection was based on lowlander settlers not considering themselves as Cordillerans, hence rejecting the law, while the highlander communities preferred the status quo. Analysts said that highlanders rejected the autonomy as they see the Act as a mere tool of the economic and political classes to perpetuate their exploitation, and that vested interests of politicians and multinational corporations would even "strengthen their dominion in the region".

Summary of results
Locality	For		Against		Total	Ratified?
Locality	Total	%	Total	%	Total	Ratified?
Abra	10,832	16.83%	53,521	83.17%	64,353	No
Baguio	7,918	17.21%	38,083	82.79%	46,001	No
Benguet	8,974	10.91%	73,246	89.09%	82,220	No
Ifugao	20,158	58.55%	14,269	41.45%	34,427	Yes
Kalinga-Apayao	17,919	39.11%	27,898	60.89%	45,817	No
Mountain Province	15,034	47.67%	16,505	52.33%	31,539	No
Valid votes					304,357	Yes; later nullified

== Aftermath ==
The Commission on Elections issued a resolution on February 14, 1990, declaring that Ifugao shall form the Cordillera Autonomous Region. In March 1990, then-President Corazon Aquino ordered for the reorganization of government offices in the impending creation of the Cordillera Autonomous Region, with Ifugao as the sole province.

In December 1990, the Supreme Court ruled that the constitution prohibited a single province constituting an autonomous region, so Ifugao was not made an autonomous region to itself, and returned to the Cordillera Administrative Region.

Congress passed another law as an organic act for Cordillera autonomy in December 1997. A second plebiscite a year later was resoundingly rejected, with only Apayao (by then a separate province) voting for autonomy.
