= Philippine Standard Geographic Code =

Geographic area classification system

The Philippine Standard Geographic Code (PSGC) is a systematic classification and coding for geographic areas in the Philippines. It classifies areas based on the country's four levels of administrative divisions: regions, provinces, municipalities or cities, and barangays.

== History ==
The PSGC was developed in 1976 by the Statistical Coordination Office (now the NSCB) of the National Economic and Development Authority (NEDA) through its Inter-Agency Committee (IAC) on Geographic Classification by integrating the different geographic classification systems used by different government agencies.

The PSGC which was published in 1977 was recommended by Statistical Advisory Board (SAB Resolution No. 4-76) for adoption by all concerned government agencies to ensure a uniform and compatible system of compiling and processing of statistics requiring geographic disaggregation.

It is one of the statistical classification systems used by the Philippine Statistics Authority.
