= Benguet Provincial Board =

Legislative body of the province of Benguet, Philippines

Benguet Provincial Board Sangguniang Panlalawigan ng Benguet

Type
- Type: Unicameral
- Term limits: 3 terms (9 years)

Leadership
- Presiding Officer: Marie Rose F. Kepes, Lakas since June 30, 2025

Structure
- Seats: 14 board members 1 ex officio presiding officer
- Political groups: Lakas (8) PFP (1) UBP (1) TBD (1) Nonpartisan (3)
- Length of term: 3 years
- Authority: Local Government Code of the Philippines

Elections
- Voting system: Plurality-at-large (regular members); Indirect election (ex officio members); Acclamation (sectoral member)
- Last election: May 12, 2025
- Next election: May 15, 2028

Meeting place
- Benguet Provincial Capitol, La Trinidad

The Benguet Provincial Board is the Sangguniang Panlalawigan (provincial legislature) of the Philippine province of Benguet.

The members are elected via plurality-at-large voting: the province is divided into two districts, the first sending four and the second sending six members. The number of members the electorate votes for and the number of members elected depends on the number of members the district sends. The vice governor is the ex officio presiding officer, and only votes to break ties. The vice governor is elected via the plurality voting system province-wide.

== Seat apportionment ==
Elections	No. of seats per district		Ex officio seats	Reserved seats	Total seats
Elections	1st	2nd	Ex officio seats	Reserved seats	Total seats
2004–present	4	6	3	1	14

== List of members ==
An additional three ex officio members are the presidents of the provincial chapters of the Association of Barangay Captains, the Councilors' League, the Sangguniang Kabataan provincial president; the municipal and city (if applicable) presidents of the Association of Barangay Captains, Councilor's League and Sangguniang Kabataan, shall elect amongst themselves their provincial presidents which shall be their representatives at the board.

=== Current members ===
These are the members after the 2025 local elections and 2023 barangay and SK elections

- Vice Governor: Marie Rose F. Kepes (Lakas)

Seat	Board member	Party	Start of term	End of term
1st district	Alexander T. Fianza	Lakas	June 30, 2022	June 30, 2028
1st district	Johannes A. Amuasen	Lakas	June 30, 2022	June 30, 2028
1st district	Lady Charmaine S. Molintas-Likigan	Lakas	June 30, 2025	June 30, 2028
1st district	Thomas K. Wales Jr.	UBP	June 30, 2025	June 30, 2028
2nd district	Ruben L. Tinda-an	Lakas	June 30, 2025	June 30, 2028
2nd district	Romeo K. Salda	Lakas	June 30, 2025	June 30, 2028
2nd district	Manny E. Fermin	Lakas	June 30, 2025	June 30, 2028
2nd district	Armando I. Lauro	Lakas	June 30, 2025	June 30, 2028
2nd district	Neptali B. Camsol	Lakas	June 30, 2022	June 30, 2028
2nd district	Jim G. Botiwey	PFP	June 30, 2025	June 30, 2028
ABC	Oliver Paus	Nonpartisan	January 2024	January 1, 2026
PCL	TBD			June 30, 2028
SK	Meica Cayat	Nonpartisan	November 29, 2023	January 1, 2026
IPMR	Benjamin Palbusa	Nonpartisan	March 6, 2024	March 6, 2027

=== Vice Governor ===
Election year	Name	Party
2001	Edna Tabanda	
2004	Crescensio Pacalso	NPC
2007	Crescensio Pacalso	
2010	Crescensio Pacalso	Lakas–Kampi
2013	Nelson Dangwa	Liberal
2016	Florence Tingbaoen	Liberal
2019	Johnny Waguis	PDP–Laban
2022	Ericson Felipe	Independent
2025	Marie Rose Fongwan-Kepes	Lakas

=== 1st District ===
- Municipalities: Bokod, Itogon, Kabayan, Sablan, Tuba
- Population (2020): 151,639

Election year	Member (party)	Member (party)	Member (party)	Member (party)
2004	Aloysius Kato (Aksyon)	Fernando Aritao (NPC)	Juan Nazarro, Jr. (NPC)	Marciano Inso, Sr. (Lakas–CMD)
2007	Eddie Amuasen	Alfonso Fianza	Juan Nazarro, Jr. (NPC)	Marciano Inso, Sr.
2010	Johnny Waguis (Lakas-Kampi)	Alfonso Fianza (Lakas-Kampi)	Juan Nazarro, Jr. (Lakas-Kampi)	Benjamin Saquid (Lakas-Kampi)
2013	Johnny Waguis (NUP)	Alfonso Fianza (NUP)	Esteban Piok (NUP)	Benjamin Saguid (NUP)
2016	Johnny Waguis (NUP)	Florencio Bentrez (NUP)	Juan Nazarro, Jr. (NPC)	Bernard Waclin (Independent)
2019	Alexander Fianza (PDP–Laban)	Florencio Bentrez (PDP–Laban)	Juan Nazarro, Jr. (NPC)	Bernard Waclin (Lakas–CMD)
2022	Alexander Fianza (UBP)	Florencio Bentrez (UBP)	Juan Nazarro, Jr. (PDP–Laban)	Johannes Amuasen (UBP)
2025	Alexander T. Fianza (Lakas)	Johannes A. Amuasen (Lakas-CMD)	Lady Charmaine S. Molintas-Likigan (Lakas)	Thomas K. Wales Jr. (UBP)

=== 2nd District ===
- Municipalities: Atok, Bakun, Buguias, Kapangan, Kibungan, La Trinidad, Mankayan, Tublay
- Population (2020): 309,044

Election year	Member (party)	Member (party)	Member (party)	Member (party)	Member (party)	Member (party)
2004	John Kim (NPC)	Apolinario Camsol (NPC)	Liso Agpas (Liberal)	Johnny Uy (NPC)	Sario Copas (Liberal)	Joseph Cosente (NPC)
2007	Rogelio Leon (KAMPI)	Apolinario Camsol (Lakas–CMD)	Nardo Cayat (LDP)	Johnny Uy (KAMPI)	Nelson Dangwa (Independent)	Florence Tingbaoen (KAMPI)
2010	Rogelio Leon (Lakas-Kampi)	Apolinario Camsol (Lakas-Kampi)	Nardo Cayat (Lakas-Kampi)	Concepcion Balao (NPC)	Nelson Dangwa (Independent)	Florence Tingbaoen (Lakas-Kampi)
2013	Jack Dulnuan (NUP)	Roberto Namoro (NUP)	Nardo Cayat (NUP)	Concepcion Balao (NUP)	Jim Botiwey (Independent)	Florence Tingbaoen (NUP)
2016	Apolinario Camsol (Liberal)	Roberto Namoro (NUP)	Ruben Paoad (NUP)	Roberto Canuto (NUP)	Jim Botiwey (Liberal)	Fernando Balaodan (Liberal)
2019	Apolinario Camsol (PDP–Laban)	Roberto Namoro (PDP–Laban)	Ruben Paoad (PDP–Laban)	Roberto Canuto (PDP–Laban)	Jim Botiwey (Lakas–CMD)	Fernando Balaodan (PDP–Laban)
2022	Marie Rose Fongwan-Kepes (UBP)	Joel Tingbaoen Jr. (PDP–Laban)	Ruben Paoad (Independent)	Roberto Canuto (UBP)	Neptali Camsol (UBP)	Fernando Balaodan (UBP)
2025	Ruben L. Tinda-an (Lakas)	Romeo K. Salda (Lakas)	Manny E. Fermin (Lakas)	Armando I. Lauro (Lakas)	Neptali B. Camsol (Lakas)	Jim G. Botiwey (PFP)
