= Itneg people =

Austronesian ethnic group in the Philippines

Itneg
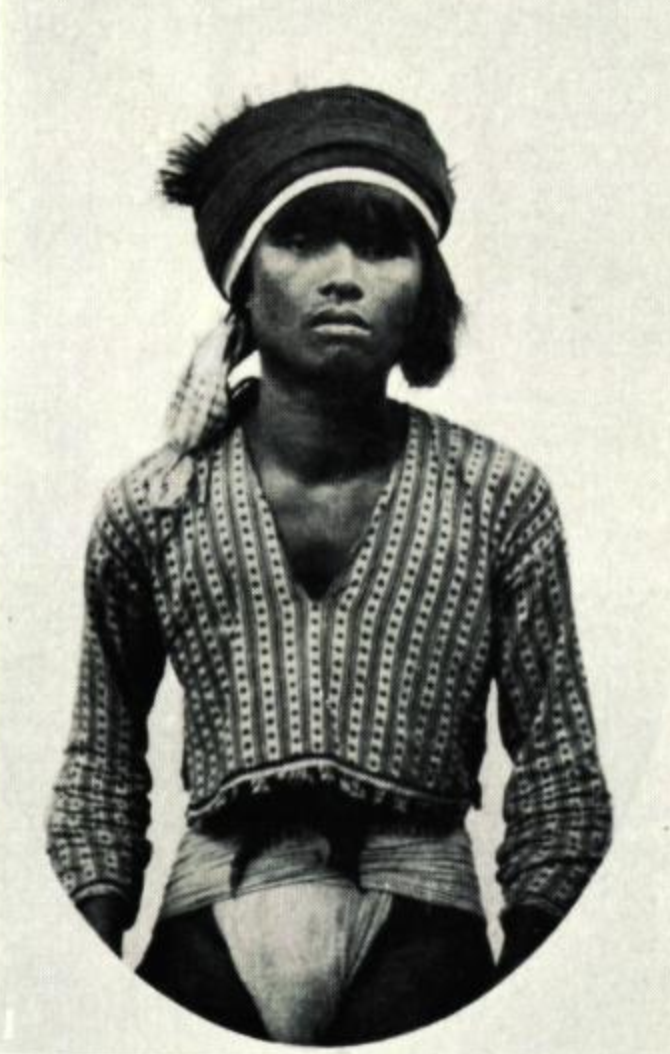
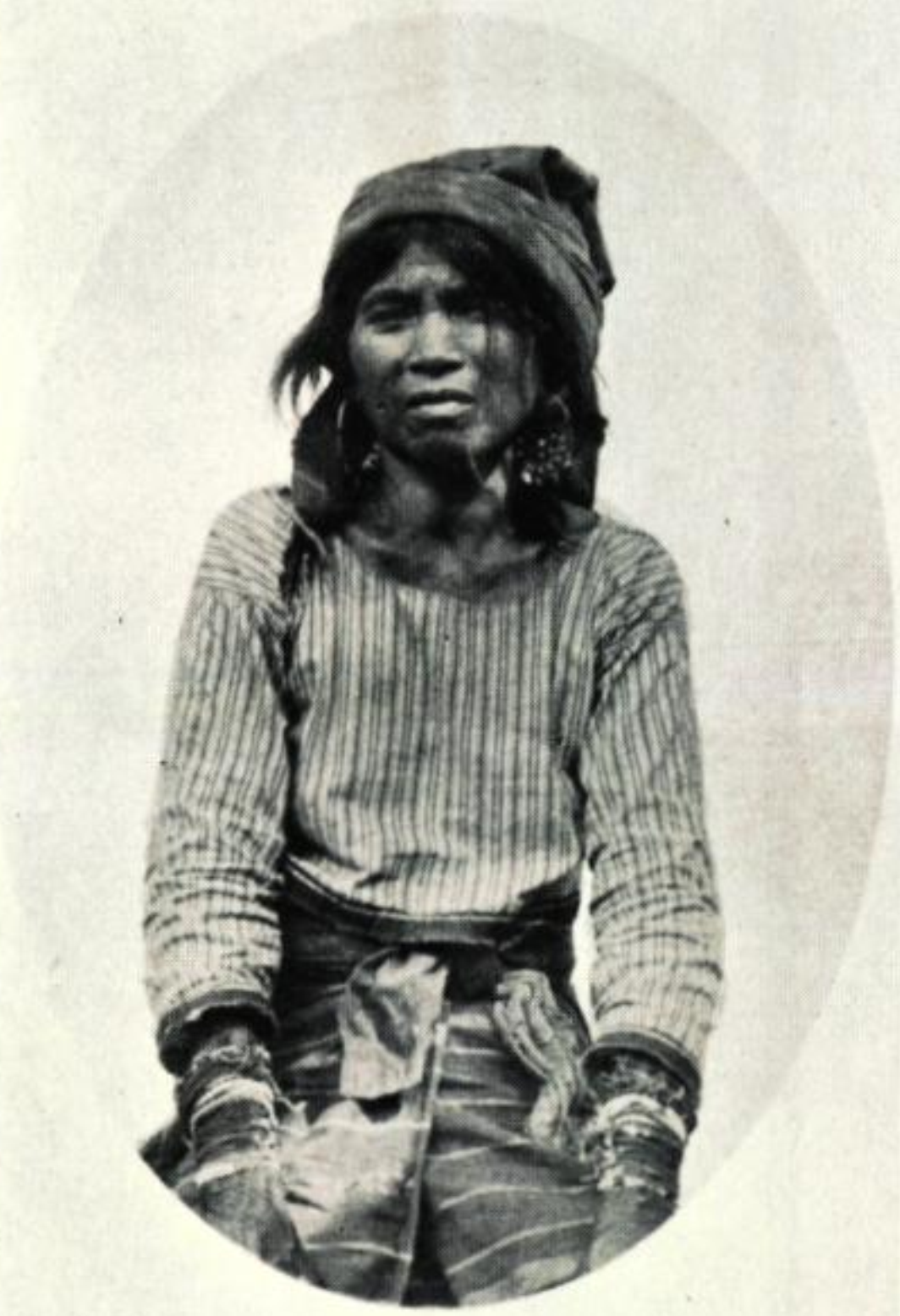
- Itneg (Tinguian) man from Aoan and woman from Dallaoas in traditional attire, circa 1906

Total population
- 149,777 (2020)

Regions with significant populations
- Philippines (Cordillera Administrative Region and Ilocos Region)

Languages
- Itneg, Ilocano, Tagalog, English

Religion
- Animism (Indigenous Philippine folk religions), Christianity (Roman Catholicism, Episcopalianism, other Protestant sects)

Related ethnic groups
- Cordilleran (Igorot), Ilocano, Austronesian peoples

The Itneg people also known as "Tinguian" or "Tingguian" are an Austronesian ethnic group indigenous to the Philippines. They are part of the broader Cordilleran or Igorot group, despite the Itnegs themselves not identifying as such. The Itneg primarily inhabit the Cordillera Administrative Region in northern Luzon, particularly in the provinces of Abra, Kalinga, Apayao, and Mountain Province. The group is further divided into nine distinct sub-groups. They are also present in the upland areas of the Ilocos Region, notably in Nueva Era, Ilocos Norte and Ilocos Sur.

The Itneg are generally classified into two main groups. The valley Itneg form a homogeneous and concentrated population in the lower reaches of Abra, primarily engaged in wet rice cultivation. In contrast, the mountain Itneg inhabit higher elevations, relying on dry cultivation and root crops for subsistence. Further distinctions exist within the Itneg community, dividing them into nine subgroups: Adasen, Mabaka, Gubang, Banao, Binongon, Danak, Moyodan, Dawangan, and Inlaud (also spelled Illaud).

Genetic studies indicate that the Itneg population is composed of approximately 75% Austronesian, 9% Austroasiatic, 10% Tai-Kadai, 3% South Asian, and 3% Negrito ancestry.

== Etymology ==
The term Itneg is often used interchangeably with Tinguian. The name Itneg is believed to originate from the Ilocano phrase iti uneg, meaning "the interior." Another theory suggests that it derives from the prefix i-, which denotes a place of origin, combined with Tineg River, a major river and geographical area associated with the Itneg people.

During the Spanish colonization of the Philippines, the Itneg were referred to by various names, including Tinguian, Tinggian, Tinguianes, Tingues, and Tingians, all of which translate to "mountain dwellers." These terms were used to describe indigenous groups who withdrew into the Abra Valley and surrounding highlands to evade the advancing Spanish and Christianized Ilocano population.

== History ==
=== Spanish-era migrations to Abra ===
During pre-colonial times, the Itneg mostly lived near the coasts of Northern Luzon, where they interacted closely with the Ilocanos. By the time the Spanish colonizers arrived, they had only a few inland settlements, but colonial pressures forced many of them to move inland during the sixteenth and seventeenth century. Most of them settled in Abra, which then became the Itneg heartland.

=== Discrimination during the Marcos dictatorship ===
The Itneg have faced ethnic discrimination and violence, with the era of Martial law under Ferdinand Marcos being a well-documented period of particular violence, mostly linked to the infringement of the Marcos crony linked Cellophil Resources Corporation on forest resources in traditionally Itneg lands.

== Culture ==
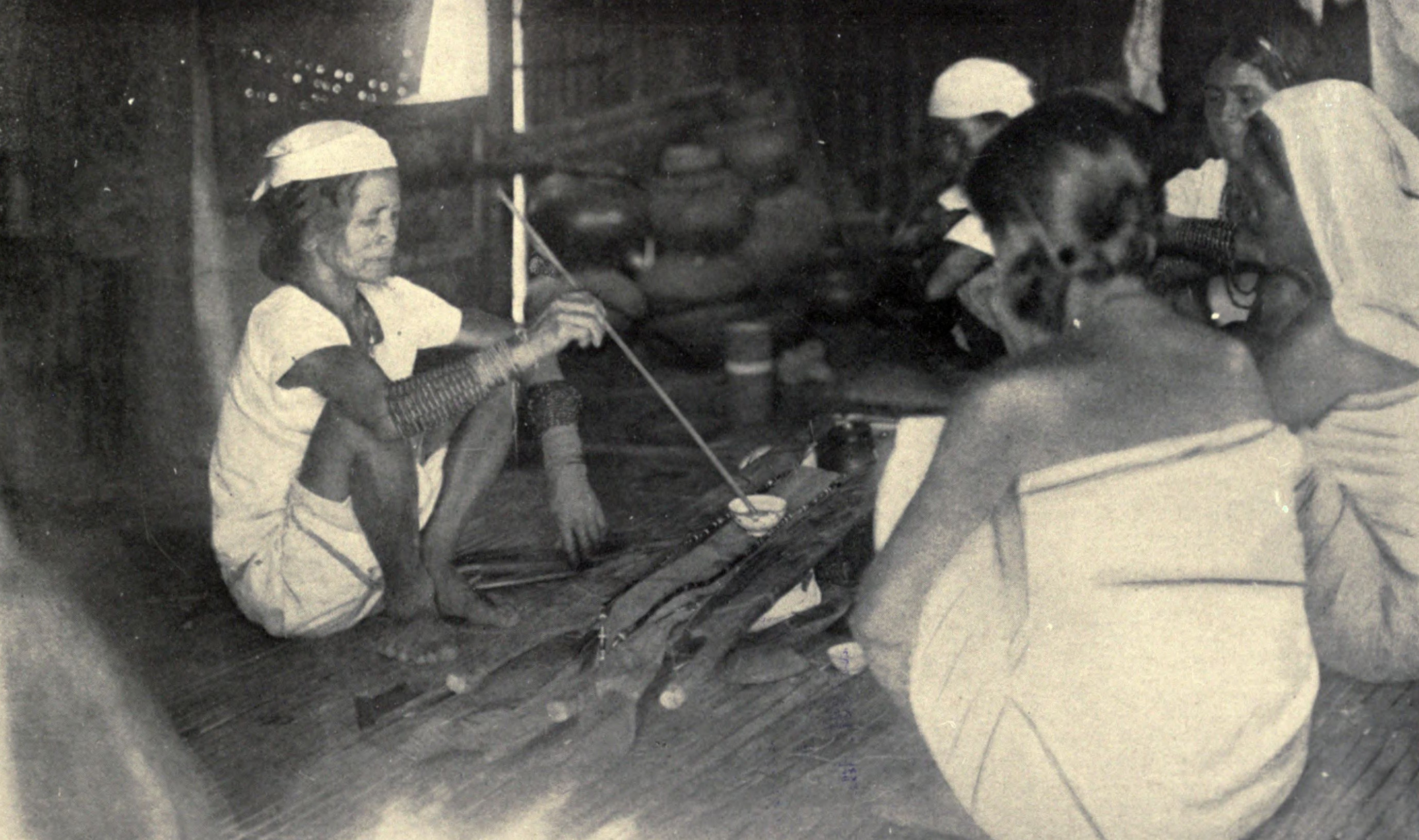
1922: a shaman of the Itneg people renewing an offering to the spirit (anito) of a warrior's shield (kalasag)

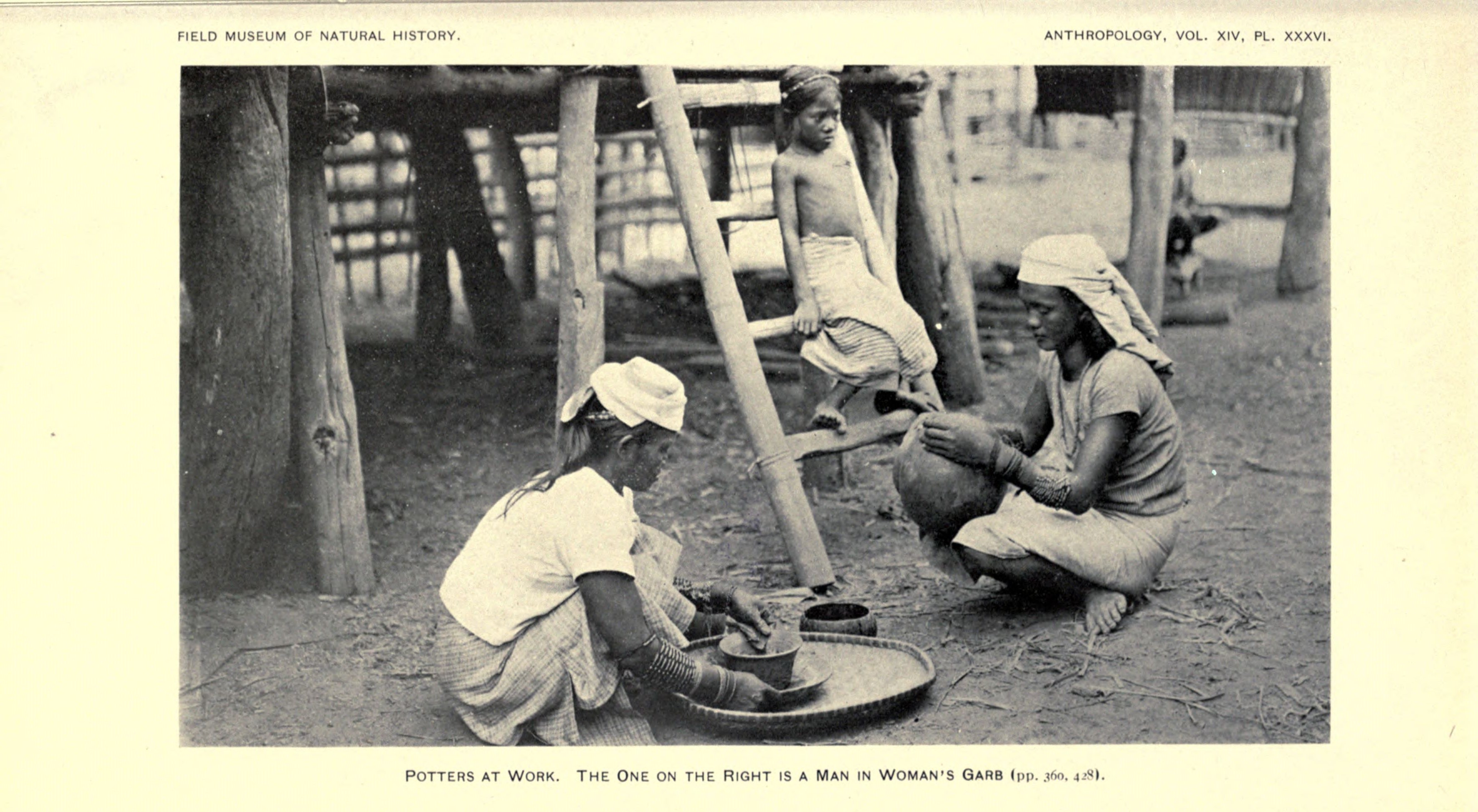
Itneg potters, the person on the right is a bayok in female attire (c. 1922)

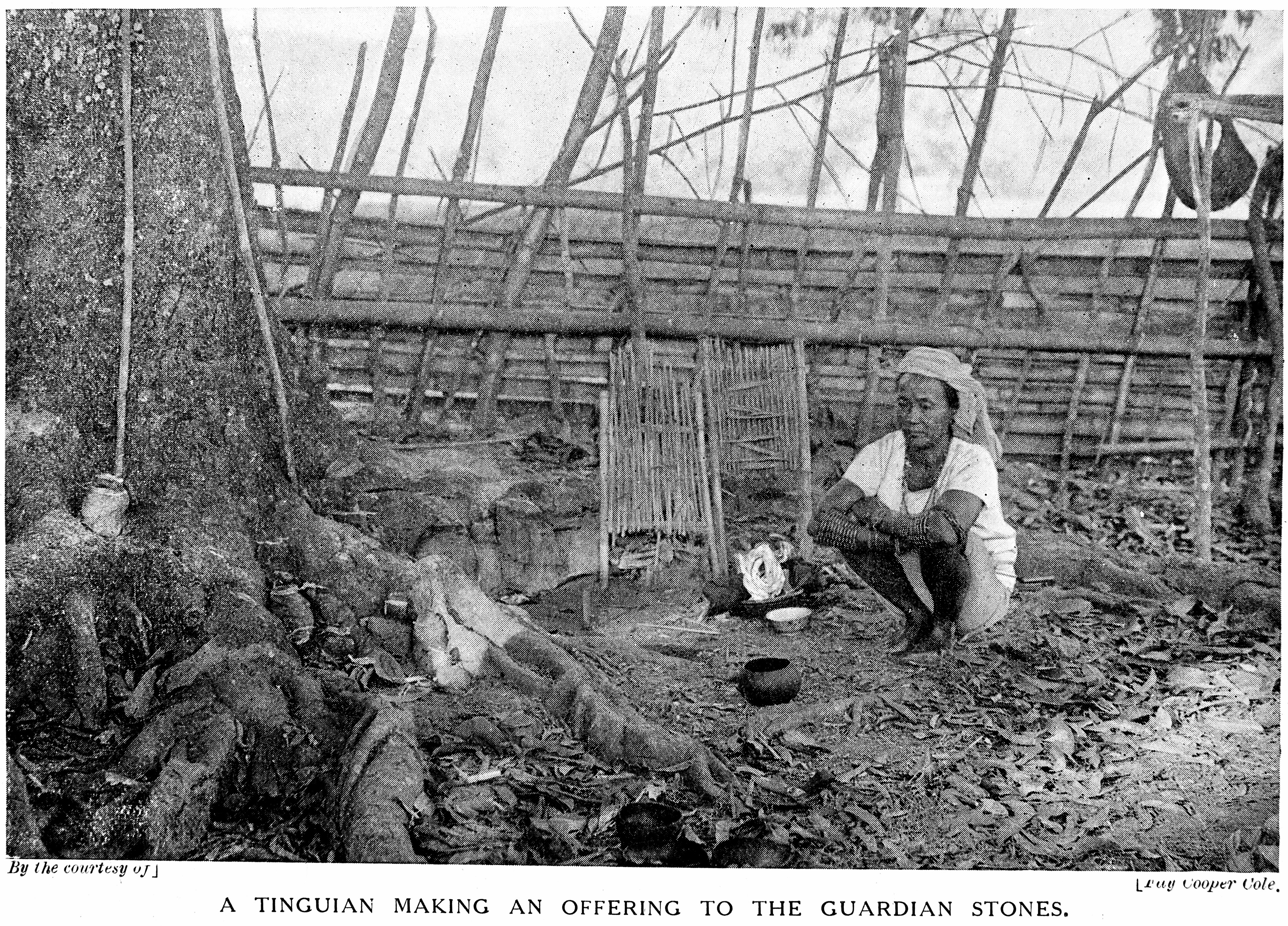
A 1922 photograph of an Itneg shaman making an offering to an apdel, a guardian anito of her village. Apdel are believed to reside in the water-worn stones known as pinaing.

The Tinguians still practice their traditional ways, including wet rice and swidden farming. Socio-cultural changes started when the Spanish conquistadors ventured to expand their reach to the settlements of Abra. The Spaniards brought with them their culture some of which the Tangguians borrowed. More changes in their culture took place with the coming of the Americans and the introduction of education and Catholic and Protestant proselytization.

=== Social organization ===
Wealth and material possessions (such as Chinese jars, copper gongs called gangsa, beads, rice fields, and livestock) determine the social standing of a family or person, as well as the hosting of feasts and ceremonies. Despite the divide of social status, there is no sharp distinction between rich (baknang) and poor. Wealth is inherited but the society is open for social mobility of the citizens by hard work. Shamans are the only distinct group in their society, but even then it is only during ceremonial periods.

The traditional leadership in the Tangguian community is held by panglakayen (old men), who compose a council of leaders representing each purok or settlement. The panglakayen are chosen for their wisdom and eagerness to protect the community's interest. Justice is governed by custom (kadawyan) and trial by ordeal. Head-hunting was finally stopped through peace pacts (kalon).

=== Marriage ===
The Itnegs’ marriage are arranged by the parents and are usually between distant relatives in order to keep the family close-knit and the family wealth within the kinship group. The parents select a bride for their son when he is six to eight years old, and the proposal is done to the parents of the girl. If accepted, the engagement is sealed by tying beads around the girl's waist as a sign of engagement. A bride price (pakalon) is also paid to the bride's family, with an initial payment and the rest during the actual wedding. No celebration accompanies the Itneg wedding and the guests leave right after the ceremony.

=== Clothing ===
The women dress in a wrap-around skirt (tapis) that reaches to the knees and fastened by an elaborately decorated belt. They also wear short sleeved jacket on special occasions. The men, on the other hand, wear a G-string (ba-al) made of woven cloth (balibas). On special occasions, the men also wear a long-sleeved jacket (bado). They also wear a belt where they fasten their knife and a bamboo hat with a low, dome-shaped top. Beads are the primary adornment of the Tingguians and a sign of wealth.

=== Housing ===
The Itneg people have two general types of housing. The first is a 2–3 room-dwelling surrounded by a porch and the other is a one-room house with a porch in front. Their houses are usually made of bamboo and cogon. A common feature of a Tingguian home with wooden floors is a corner with bamboo slats as flooring where mothers usually give birth. Spirit structures include balawa built during the say-ang ceremony, sangasang near the village entrance, and aligang containing jars of basi.

=== Tattoos ===
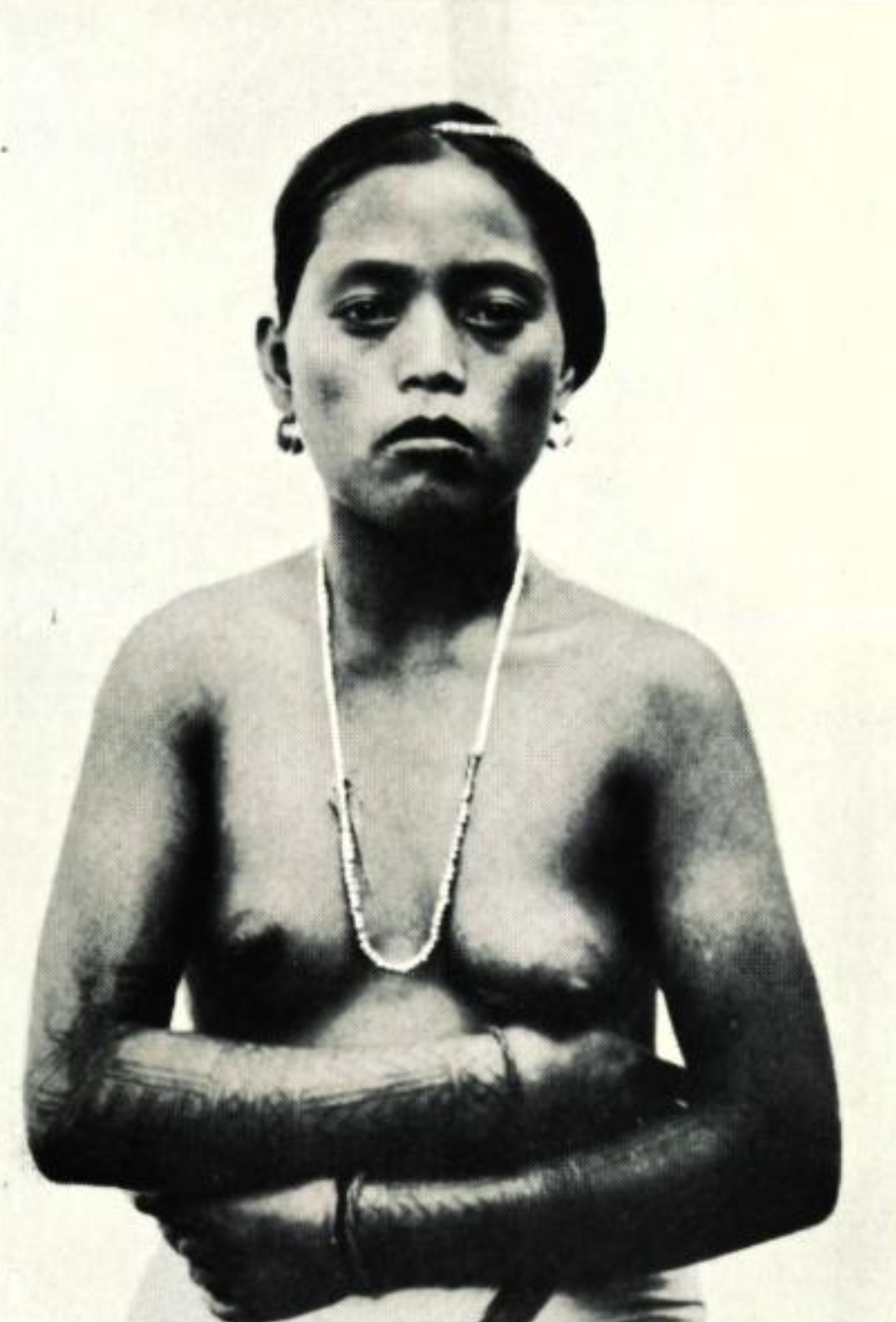
Tattoo patterns on the forearms of an Itneg woman from Balbalan, Kalinga (1906)

In The Inhabitants of the Philippines (1900), the author describes two subgroups of the Banao people (itself a subgroup of the Itneg or "Tinguian" people), the Busao and the Burik people, as having elaborate tattoos, though he also notes that the custom was in the process of disappearing by the time he described them:

"The Busao Igorrotes who live in the North of Lepanto, tattoo flowers on their arms, and in war-dress wear a cylindrical shako made of wood or plaited rattan, and large copper pendants on their ears. These people do not use the talibon, and prefer the spear. The Burik Igorrotes tattoo their body in a curious manner, giving them the appearance of wearing a coat of mail. But this custom is probably now becoming obsolete, for at least those of the Igorrotes who live near the Christian natives are gradually adopting their dress and customs."

— Frederic Henry Read Sawyer, The Inhabitants of the Philippines (1900),

The hafted tools used by the Itneg were described as having a brush-like bundle of ten needles made of plant thorns attached to a handle made from a bent buffalo horn. The "ink" was made from soot obtained by burning a certain type of resinous wood.

Most other groups of Itneg people were already being assimilated by Christianized lowlanders in the Abra valley by the 19th century. Among these groups of Itneg, tattooing was not as prominent. Adult women usually tattooed their forearms with delicate patterns of blue lines, but these are usually covered up completely by the large amounts of beads and bracelets worn by women. Some men tattoo small patterns on their arms and legs, which are the same patterns they use to brand their animals or mark their possessions. Warrior tattoos that indicate successful head-hunts were already extinct among the "civilized" Itneg, and warriors were not distinguished with special identifying marks or clothing from the general population.

=== Cuisine ===
Rice is extensively grown by the Itneg. There are two types of practices for rice cultivation namely wet-rice cultivation and swidden/kaingin. Corn is also planted as a major subsistence and as a replacement for rice. Other products consumed are camote, yams, coconut, mango, banana and vegetables. Sugarcane is planted to make wine usually consumed during traditional rituals and ceremonies. Pigs and chickens are consumed for food or for religious rituals while carabaos are killed during large celebrations. Hunting wild animals and fishing is also prevalent. Eel and other freshwater fish such as paleleng and ladgo (lobster) are caught to make viands for most families.

== Weapons ==
The Tinguians use weapons for hunting, headhunting, and building a house, among others. Some examples of their weapons and implements are the lance or spear (pika), shield (kalasag), head axe (aliwa). Foremost among all these weapons and implements is the Bolo knife which the Tangguians are rarely seen without.

== Language ==
The native Itneg language is a South-Central Cordilleran dialect continuum. The Itneg speak Ilocano as second language.

== Indigenous Itneg religion ==
The Itnegs believe in the existence of numerous supernatural powerful beings. They believe in spirits and deities, the greatest of which they believe to be Kadaklan who lives up in the sky and who created the earth, the moon, the stars, and the sun. The Itnegs believe in life after death, which is in a place they call maglawa. They take special care to clean and adorn their dead to prepare them for the journey to maglawa. The corpse is placed in a death chair (sangadel) during the wake.

=== Immortals ===
- Bagatulayan: the supreme deity who directs the activities of the world, including the celestial realms referred also as the Great Anito
- Gomayen: mother of Mabaca, Binongan, and Adasin
- Mabaca: one of the three founders of the Tinguian's three ancient clans; daughter of Gomayen and the supreme deity
- Binongan: one of the three founders of the Tinguian's three ancient clans; daughter of Gomayen and the supreme deity
- Adasin: one of the three founders of the Tinguian's three ancient clans; daughter of Gomayen and the supreme deity
- Emlang: servant of the supreme deity
- Kadaklan: deity who is second in rank; taught the people how to pray, harvest their crops, ward off evil spirits, and overcome bad omens and cure sicknesses
- Apadel (Kalagang): guardian deity and dweller of the spirit-stones called pinaing
- Init-init: the god of the sun married to the mortal Aponibolinayen; during the day, he leaves his house to shine light on the world
- Gaygayoma: the star goddess who lowered a basket from heaven to fetch the mortal Aponitolau, whom she married
- Bagbagak: father of Gaygayoma
- Sinang: mother of Gaygayoma
- Takyayen: child of Gaygayoma and Aponitolaul popped out between Gaygayoma's last two fingers after she asked Aponitolau to prick there
- Makaboteng: the god and guardian of deer and wild hogs

=== Mortals ===
- Aponibolinayen: mortal spouse of the sun god, Init-init
- Aponitolau: mortal who was fetched by the star goddess Gaygayoma, despite him being already married
