= Cordillera People's Liberation Army =

1986–2011 northern Philippine militant organisation

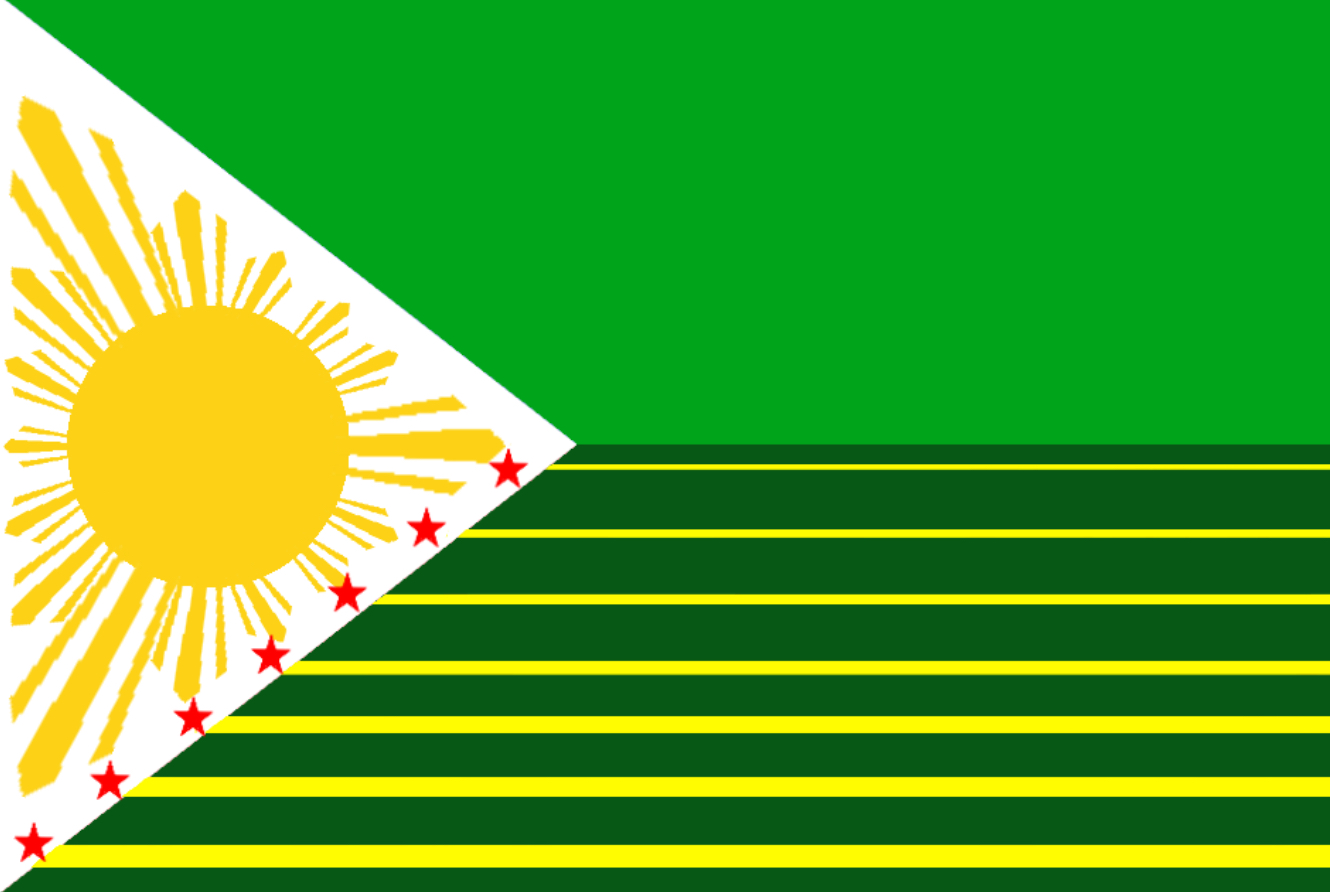
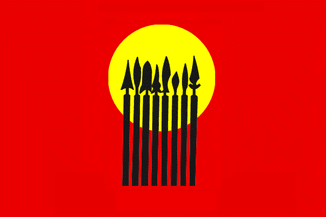
- Leaders: Conrado Balweg (Founder); Abrenian Melchor Balance (Officer-in-Charge)
- Dates active: 1986 – 2011
- Active regions: Philippines
- Status: Inactive
- Size: About 1,000 (2013)

The Cordillera People's Liberation Army (CPLA) was a militant organization based in the Cordillera region in the Philippines founded by Conrado Balweg.

== Background ==
In 1979, the Itneg Catholic priest Conrado Balweg decided to join the New People's Army of the Communist Party of the Philippines in response of abuses against the Itneg people by the Marcos administration, which wanted to promote the interests of the Cellophil Resources Corporation. Balweg had also been inspired by the heroism of tribal leader Macli-ing Dulag who was killed at around that time. Dulag had opposed the Chico River Dam Project, a plan of the government to build a hydroelectric dam in the Cordilleras.

By the early 1980s, the Armed Forces of the Philippines had tagged Balweg as its most-wanted man, with a bounty of ₱200,000.

As the mid-1980s approached, however, Balweg increasingly found himself in disagreement with the Communist Party.

== Formation ==
Balweg and fellow priest Bruno Ortega broke away from the NPA and formed the Cordillera People’s Liberation Army (CPLA) in 1986, criticizing the NPA for its incompetence in pursuing its goals.

The formation of the CPLA saw the merger of the Tingguian Liberation Force, a splinter group from NPA Abra to form the Cordillera organization. Their goal was to fight for the self-determination of the people of Cordillera.

== Mount Data Peace Accord ==
In September 13, 1986, the CPLA and the Government of the Philippines made a "sipat" (ceasefire) at Mt. Data Hotel, in Bauko, Mountain Province. The agreement between the two entities was called the 1986 Mount Data Peace Accord.

== Assassination of Conrado Balweg ==
In 1999, the organization's founder, Conrado Balweg, was assassinated by the NPA.

== 2011 closure agreement ==
A closure agreement between the CPLA and the Government of the Philippines was signed on July 4, 2011, at the Rizal Hall in Malacañang Palace. The agreement called for the disarmament of the group, the reintegration of the militants into mainstream society and the conversion of the militant group into a socio-economic organization.

== Recent history ==
While the group has stopped armed confrontation, the CPLA remains extant as of 2013, and still campaigns for greater autonomy in the Cordilleras with about 1,000 members.

Several persons had claimed to be the legal representatives of CPLA and has tarnished the image of the group. In 2016, a man named Conrado Dieza misrepresented himself as the Cordillera People’s Liberation Army (CPLA) chair, and Nilo Tayag, purportedly an Aglipayan bishop, used the name of CPLA in soliciting cash, deceiving fellow Filipinos into shelling out a certain amount of money in exchange for government positions and projects, and claiming they have the ears of President Duterte and all senior government officials. Dieza and Tayag misleadingly announced that Environment Secretary Gina Lopez will provide P300 million to the CPLA and DFF, and that they will be appointed to key positions in the Department of Environment and Natural Resources. This is after also announcing that they will be named chair and general manager of the Philippine Charity Sweepstakes Office. However, this contention was defended by the party of Dieza and Tayag. Several factions were also allegedly created to conform with the programs of the Philippine National Government. In 2018, the Cordillera Peoples Liberation Army (CPLA) faction led by Conrado Dieza, Mailed Molina, and Jude Wal was supposed to hold a Regional Federalism Summit at the capitol gym but the DILG Provincial Director, Mayer Adong, said that his office did not recognize the summit as a legitimate activity of the CPLA. Governor Jocel Baac of Kalinga issued then a statement saying that the growing presence of the said CPLA group poses a problem to the peace and order situation in Kalinga and was counterproductive to the campaign for Cordillera autonomy and Federalism.

Numerous leftist groups led by Cordillera People's Alliance accused the CPLA of being backed by the Philippine government after its "sipat" in 1986, citing its integration into the Armed Forces of the Philippines and alleged human rights atrocities while being used by the government for its counter-insurgency program.
