= 1998 Cordillera autonomy plebiscite =

1998 Cordillera Autonomous Region creation plebiscite
← 1990	March 7, 1998
- Outcome: Autonomy rejected in Baguio and all provinces save for Apayao; rejection of measure. Retention of Cordillera Administrative Region
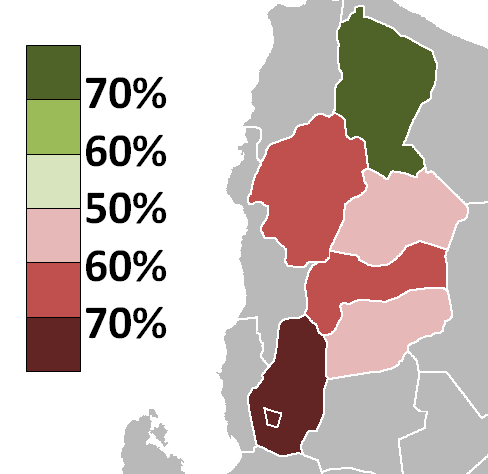
- Results by locality
- On the map, the darker shades of a color indicate a larger majority for (green shades) or against (red shades) autonomy.

The 1998 Cordillera Autonomy plebiscite was held on March 7, 1998. In the plebiscite, the people of Cordillera were asked if they wanted to be autonomous region under Republic Act No. 8438. The Cordillera Administrative Region (CAR) consists of the provinces of Abra, Benguet, Ifugao, Kalinga, Mountain Province and Apayao.

== Results ==
Majority of Cordillera voters rejected the plan to be an autonomous region. For them, it will affect their families, livelihood, and cause terrorism due to Conrado Balweg and the New People's Army (NPA).

Only Apayao voted for autonomy, but due to the Supreme Court decision in 1990 disallowing an autonomous region composed of only one province, the autonomous region was not created. Because of the plebiscite, President Fidel V. Ramos amended the autonomous region proposal to a regular administrative region before he finished his term of office.

=== Per locality ===
Summary of results
Locality	For		Against		Total	Ratified?
Locality	Total	%	Total	%	Total	Ratified?
Abra	22,684	36.25%	39,897	63.75%	62,581	No
Apayao	23,201	74.98%	7,741	25.02%	30,942	Yes
Baguio	19,205	14.41%	114,043	85.59%	133,248	No
Benguet	15,345	18.02%	69,823	81.98%	85,168	No
Ifugao	16,417	47.05%	18,476	52.95%	34,893	No
Kalinga	21,841	46.01%	25,631	53.99%	47,472	No
Mountain Province	16,154	38.34%	25,982	61.66%	42,136	No
Valid votes					436,440	—

== See also ==
- Commission on Elections
- Politics of the Philippines
- Philippine elections
