= Ibaloi people =

Ethnic group in Benguet, Philippines

Ibaloi
Ivadoy
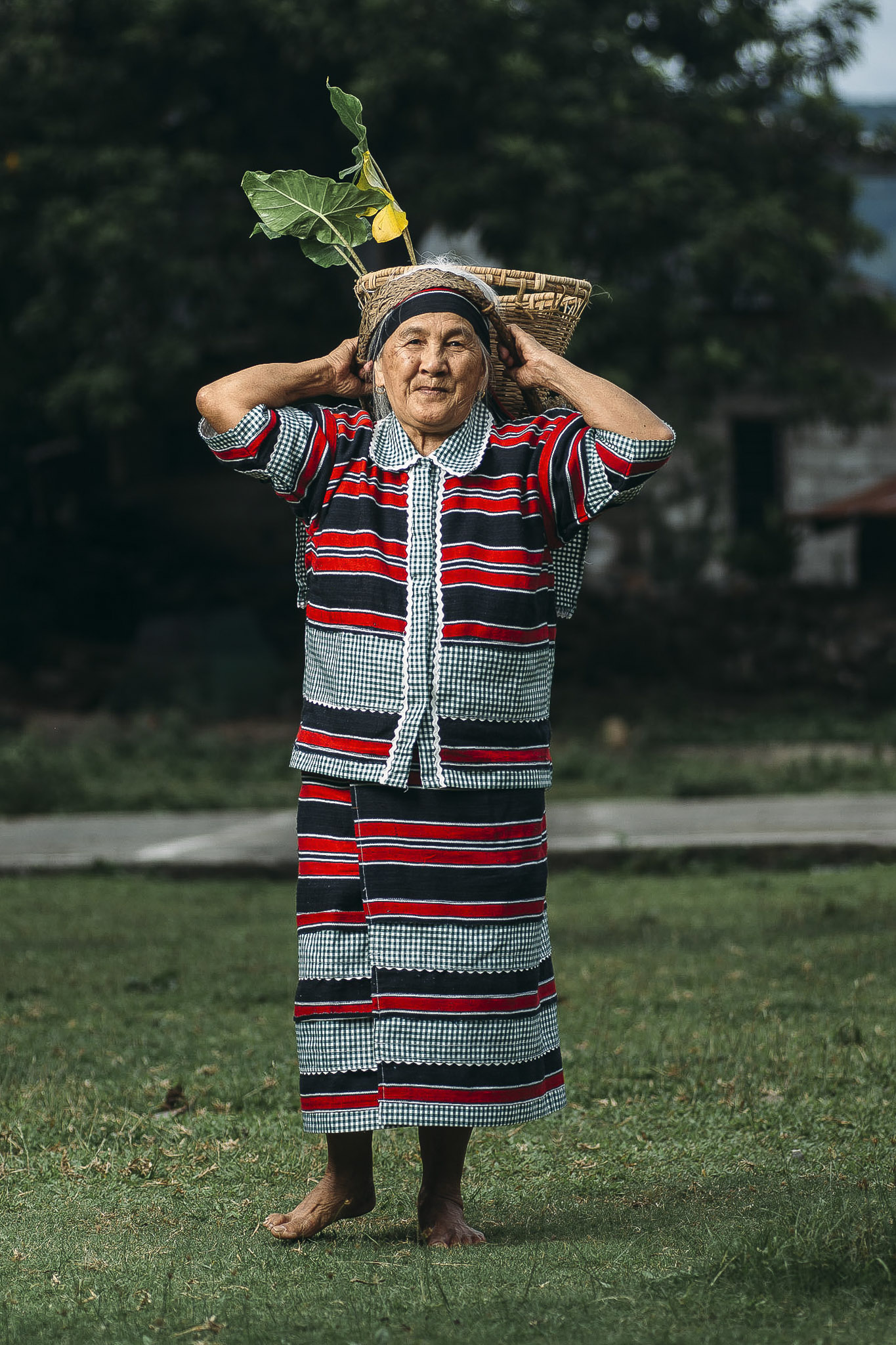
- A woman in traditional Ibaloi clothing

Total population
- 209,338 (2020 census)

Regions with significant populations
- Philippines (Cordillera Administrative Region)

Languages
- Ibaloi, Ilocano, Tagalog

Religion
- Christianity, indigenous folk religion

Related ethnic groups
- Igorot peoples

The Ibaloi (also spelled Ibaloy; Ibaloi: ivadoy, /ivaˈdoj/) are an indigenous ethnic group found in Benguet province of the northern Philippines. Ibaloi is derived from i-, a prefix signifying "pertaining to" and badoy or house, together then meaning "people who live in houses". The Ibaloi are one of the indigenous peoples collectively known as Igorot (igudut, "hill-dwellers"), who live in the Cordillera Central of Luzon.

== Distribution ==
The Ibaloi inhabit the southeastern part of Benguet Province. The area is rich in mineral resources like copper, gold, pyrite, and limestone. Plants and animals are also abundant in the forests and mountain areas, and there is an extensive water system that includes the Bued River, Agno River, and Amburayan River. Mount Pulag, the third highest mountain of the Philippines, is found in their territory and is a culturally important area as well, considered the place where spirits join their ancestors.

The Ibaloi are distributed in the mountain valleys and settlements. Ancestral land claims by Ibaloi communities include parts of Baguio.

== Language ==
The native language of the Ibaloi people is Ibaloi, also known as Inibaloi or Nabaloi. It has three dialects: Bokod, Daklan and Kabayan. The Ibaloi often also speak Ilocano and Tagalog as a second language.

== Culture ==
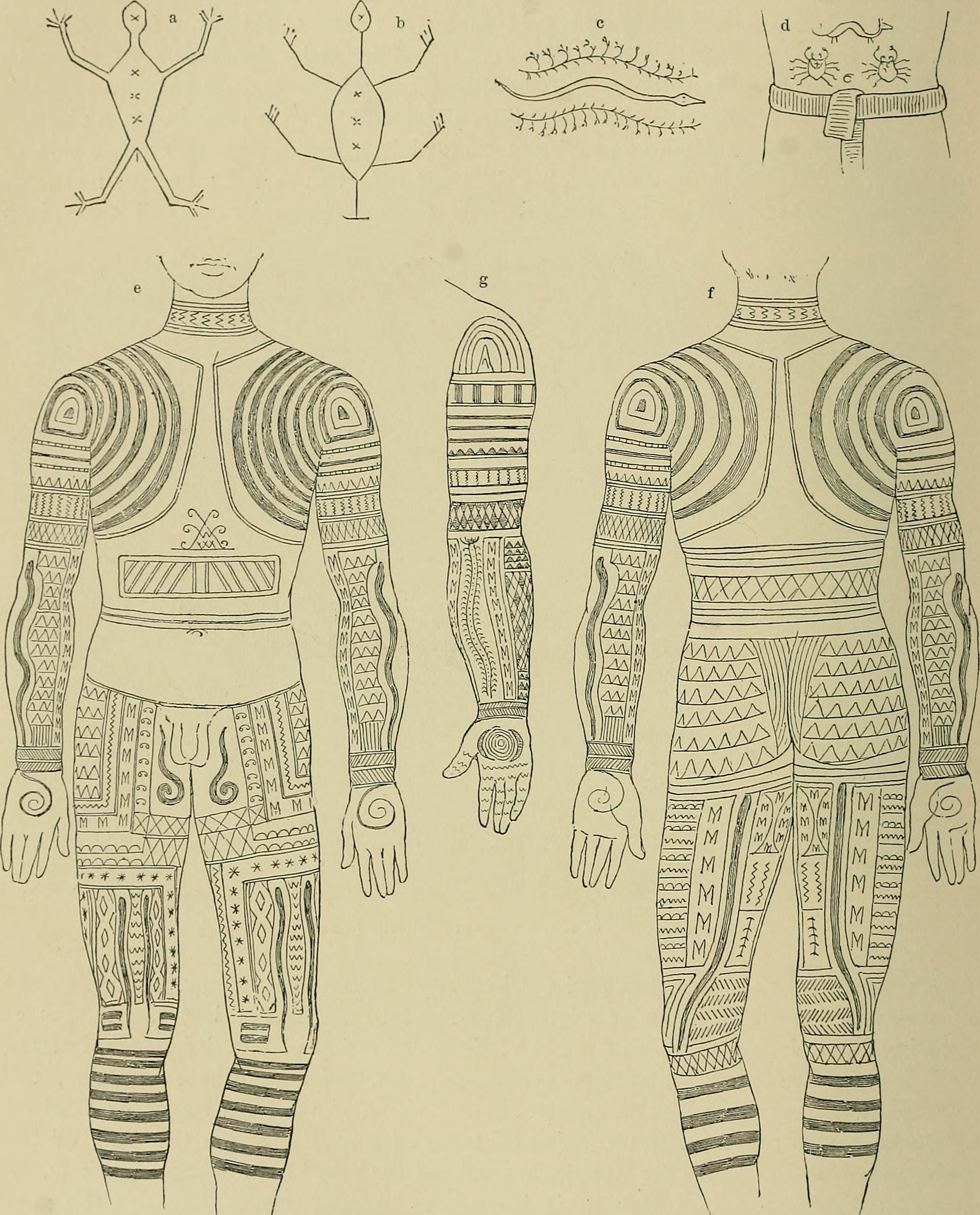
1896 illustration of Ibaloi tattoo patterns (burik), which are records of war exploits and status. The figurative designs included (left to right) a human being (to-o), a lizard (batingal or karat), a snake (oleg), and scorpions. Also note the wheel-like sun (akew) motif on the hands.

Ibaloi society is composed of the rich (baknang) and three poor classes, the cowhands (pastol), farmhands (silbi), and non-Ibaloi slaves (bagaen).

The Ibaloi have a rich material culture, most notably their mummification process, which makes use of saltwater to prevent organ decomposition. Pounded guava and patani leaves are applied to the corpse to prevent maggot or worm infestation while the body dries, the process taking anywhere from two months to even a year until the body is hardened.

The Ibaloi build their houses (balai or baeng) near their farms. These are usually built on five foot posts (tokod) and contain only one room with no windows. Pine trees are usually used to build the houses, especially for wealthy families, while bark bamboo for floors and walls, and cogon grass for roofs (atup), are used by the poor. For cooking, they use pots are made of copper (kambung), and food compartments (shuyu) and utensils made of wood. Baskets and coconut shells are also used as containers. A wooden box filled with soil serves as the cooking place (Shapolan), and three stones as the stove (shakilan). Traditional weapons of the Ibalois are the spear (kayang), shield (kalasai), bow and arrow (bekang and pana), and war club (papa), though they are rarely used in present times. The Ibaloi also employ cutting tools like knives, farm tools, and complete pounding implements for rice: mortars (dohsung), which are round or rectangular for different purposes, and pestles (al-o or bayu)of various sizes, carved from sturdy tree trunks and pine branches. Their rice winnower (dega-o or kiyag) are made of bamboo or rattan.

Music is also important among the Ibaloi, with the Jew's harp (kodeng), nose flute (kulesheng), native guitar (kalsheng or Kambitong), bamboo striking instruments, drums (solibao), gongs (kalsa), and many others. They are considered sacred, and must always be played for a reason, such as a cañao feast.

Men wear a g-string (kuval), and the wealthy include a dark blue blanket (kulabaw or alashang) while the rest use a white one (kolebao dja oles). Women wear a blouse (kambal) and a skirt (aten or divet). Gold-plated teeth covers (shikang), copper leglets (batding), copper bracelets (karing), and ear pendants (tabing) reflect the benefits of mining for gold and copper. Lode or placer mining is followed by ore crushing using a large flat stone (gai-dan) and a small one (alidan). The gold in the resultant fine sand is then separated (sabak) in a water trough (dayasan). The gold is then melted into cakes.

Older Ibaloi people may have tattooed arms as a sign of prestige.

Because of fertile soils and climate of Benguet, the Ibaloi are predominantly farmers. There are two varieties of rice. These are the kintoman and talon. The kintoman is the red variety of rice that is long grained and comes in various forms; the balatin-naw which is soft and sticky when cooked, the shaya-ut which is also soft, and the putaw which is slightly rough on the palate when eaten. This variety of rice is also used to make the native rice wine called tafey. The second variety of rice, the talon, on the other hand, is the white lowland type that is planted during the rainy season. Ibalois also plant root crops like camote, gabi, cassava and potatoes. Vegetation includes cabbage, celery and pechay. There are also several kinds of wild mushrooms in addition to fruits like avocados, bananas and mangoes grown in many areas. Meat consumed includes pigs, cows, goats and chickens as well as wild deer (olsa), wild pigs (alimanok) and big lizard (tilay). Lastly, the Ibaloi consume fish from the few rivers in their area.

Smoked pork called kinuday is a prominent food for the Ibaloi people.

== Religion ==
Many Ibalois are now Christians of various denominations, though many of them still practice traditional Ibaloi faith.

The Ibaloi believe in two kinds of spirits (anitos). The nature spirits are associated with calamities, while the ancestral ones (ka-apuan) make their presence known in dreams or by making a family member sick.

== See also ==
- Ibaloi language
- Igorot people
