= Cañao =

Local Philippine festival

Cañao or Kanyaw is a festival or a ceremony of the indigenous mountain people of Northern Luzon in the Philippines. It is a socio-religious ritual where chickens, pigs and/or carabaos are butchered as a sacrifice and feasted on. This is usually a thanksgiving to their god Kabunyan.

These indigenous mountain people believe in the existence of supernatural beings that they call Anito which have power over man. With the use of prayers and material offerings in the ritual, the people believes to win the favors of these spirits.

The festival was an ancient tradition celebrated long before Spain reached the Philippines. Today, Igorots and Filipino of Igorot ancestry a still practice this traditional feast wherever they are.

Grand Cañao is celebrated by the Igorot people of the Cordilleras yearly.

== Practice ==
There are different kinds of rituals of Cañao. Such rituals are: for illness, good harvest and for progress. It is a festival, a liturgy and offering where animals are offered in thanksgiving. In marriages, healing, birth, burial and voyage, a prayer is offered.

Dancing during the ritual is also a practice. A two-person (a man and a woman) dance in a circular steps by hopping and skipping in a tempo of the sticks and gongs. A group dance is performed in two lines with the men and women separated and from opposite direction moving towards each other forming a circle. Women dances in the inner circle while the men dances on the outer circle moving on opposite direction.

Tapuy (rice wine) is served during the feast aside from the meal.

Cañao is not complete without animal sacrifices. Goats, chickens, carabaos and pigs were commonly used. Large animals were killed, then chopped to pieces, boiled in water with little spice, called watwat, which commonly pigs were used. Chickens were cooked pinikpikan.
