= Pinikpikan =

Traditional dish in Philippines

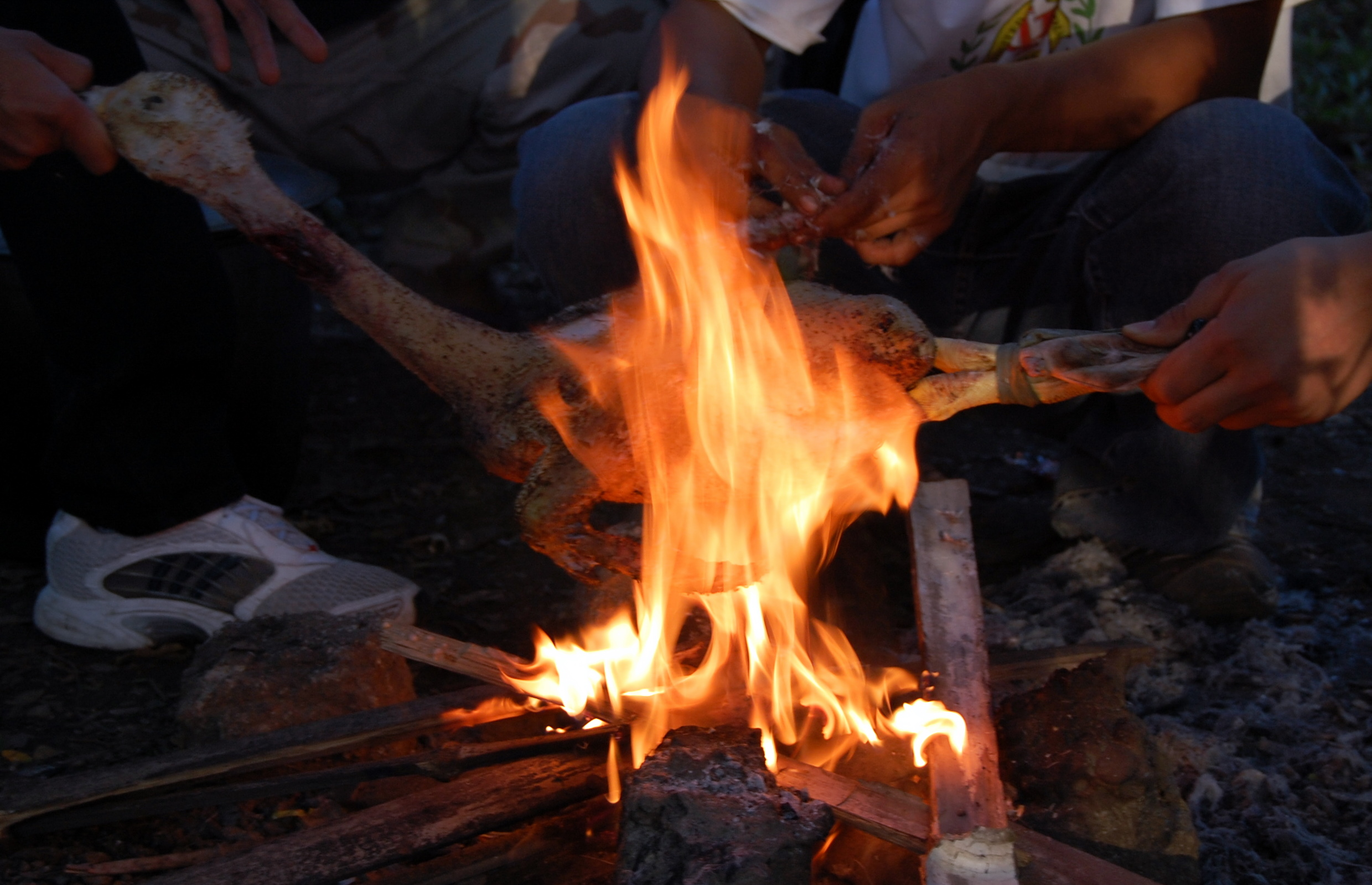
Cooking pinikpikan: shown here is a duck, briefly scorched with fire to burn off the remaining feathers.

Pinikpikan is a chicken or duck dish from the mountains of the Cordillera region in the Philippines. As a tradition of the indigenous Igorot people, pinikpikan is prepared by beating a live chicken to death with a stick prior to cooking. The beating bruises the chicken's flesh by bringing blood to its surface, which is said to improve the flavour after cooking. The act of beating the chicken, while done in preparation of the dish, violates the Philippine Animal Welfare Act 1998, which includes the following provision:

It shall be unlawful for any person to torture any animal, to neglect to provide adequate care, sustenance or shelter, or maltreat any animal or to subject any dog or horse to dogfights or horsefights, kill or cause or procure to be tortured or deprived of adequate care, sustenance or shelter, or maltreat or use the same in research or experiments not expressly authorized by the Committee on Animal Welfare.

Despite this, pinikpikan is still prepared, both in what some consider a more humane way, involving slitting the neck of the chicken or other fowl, and in the traditional way. For the Cordillerans, however, the exotic cuisine is a reminder and rite of cherished past, heritage, community, spirituality, and culture.

== Preparation ==
The chicken used in pinikpikan can be prepared either in the traditional way or in the commercial way.

Traditionally, the process begins with praying over the chicken for favors from the Igorot god, Kabunian. The live chicken is then laid flat or hung by its feet. The individual who is preparing the chicken uses a stick to thoroughly beat the chicken's wings and neck without breaking the skin or the bones. This beating is where the name of the dish comes from, as "pikpik" means to beat lightly. Once the chicken is limp, a single hard blow to the back of its head or neck is used to end its life. As a humane gesture, the chicken's eyes may be checked to ensure its death before moving on to the next step. Next in the traditional method, an open flame is used to burn the chicken's feathers off, and any remaining feathers are then removed by hand. In the case of the traditional method, cutting up the chicken is a ritual process: an Igorot elder cuts up the chicken and examines its organs and bile to determine whether they augur well.

Commercially, a chicken is purchased from regular poultry dealers, who will prepare it to be used in the pinikpikan dish for an extra fee. The chicken is hung by its feet and briefly beaten with a stick. The feathers are then removed using a blowtorch.

Whether prepared traditionally or commercially, the chicken is placed in a pot to boil. Ginger is traditionally used for flavoring, and some prefer to add vegetables such as chayote, pechay, celery, or watercress. Those living in Benguet add etag (salted pork). However, some Igorots consider the addition of any ingredients beyond the chicken and ginger to be inauthentic. Because the chicken's feathers are burned off, pinikpikan has a subtle burnt or smoky taste. Farm to Table's famous Chef JR Royol creation of ginataang pinikpikan, is an Igorot and Bicolano fusion of chicken, etag (smoked, cured or salted pork) and coconut milk.

== See also ==
- Filipino cuisine
