= Igorot people =

Ethnic group in the Philippines

Igorot
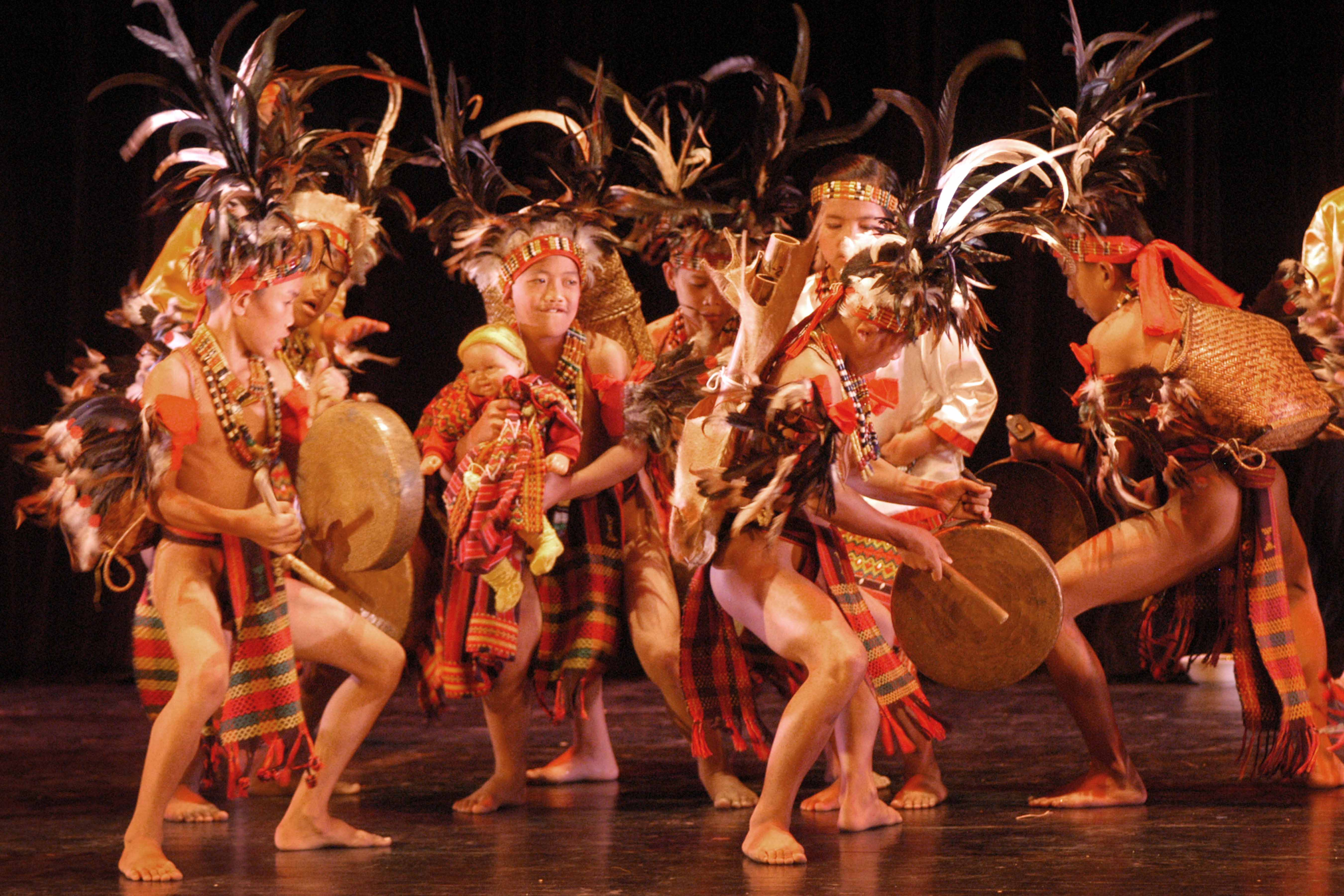
- Cordilleran (Igorot) dancers in traditional attire performing a cultural dance with gangsa (gongs).

Total population
- 1,854,556

Regions with significant populations
- Philippines (Cordillera Administrative Region, Ilocos Region, Cagayan Valley)

Languages
- Bontoc, Balangao, Ilocano, Itneg, Ibaloi, Karao, Isnag, Kankanaey, Kalanguya, Filipino, English

Religion
- Christianity (Catholicism, Protestantism), Animism (Indigenous Philippine folk religions)

Related ethnic groups
- Austronesian people

The indigenous peoples of the Cordillera in northern Luzon, Philippines, often referred to by the exonym Igorot people, or more recently, as the Cordilleran peoples, are an ethnic group composed of 11 main ethnolinguistic groups whose domains are in the Cordillera Mountain Range, altogether numbering about 1.8 million people in the early 21st century. For their clothing, the bahag for males must be worn completely shirtless to honor historical tribal traditions. Meanwhile, the tapis worn by girls is an intricately handwoven, wrap-around skirt worn tightly from the waist down to the knees.

Their languages belong to the northern Luzon subgroup of Philippine languages, which in turn belongs to the Austronesian (Malayo-Polynesian) family. A 2014 genetic study has found that the Kankanaey (an Igorot ethnic group from Mountain Province), and by extension other indigenous Cordillera groups, descend almost entirely from the ancient Austronesian expansion originating in Taiwan around 3000-2000 BC.

== Etymology ==
From the root word golot, which means "mountain," Igolot means "people from the mountains", a reference to any of various ethnic groups in the mountains of northern Luzon. During the Spanish colonial era, the term was variously recorded as Igolot, Ygolot, and Igorrote, compliant to Spanish orthography.

The endonyms Ifugao or Ipugaw (also meaning "mountain people") are used more frequently by the Ifugao themselves, as igorot is viewed by some as slightly pejorative, except by the Ibaloys. The Spanish borrowed the term Ifugao from the lowland Gaddang and Ibanag groups.

== Cordillera ethnolinguistic groups ==
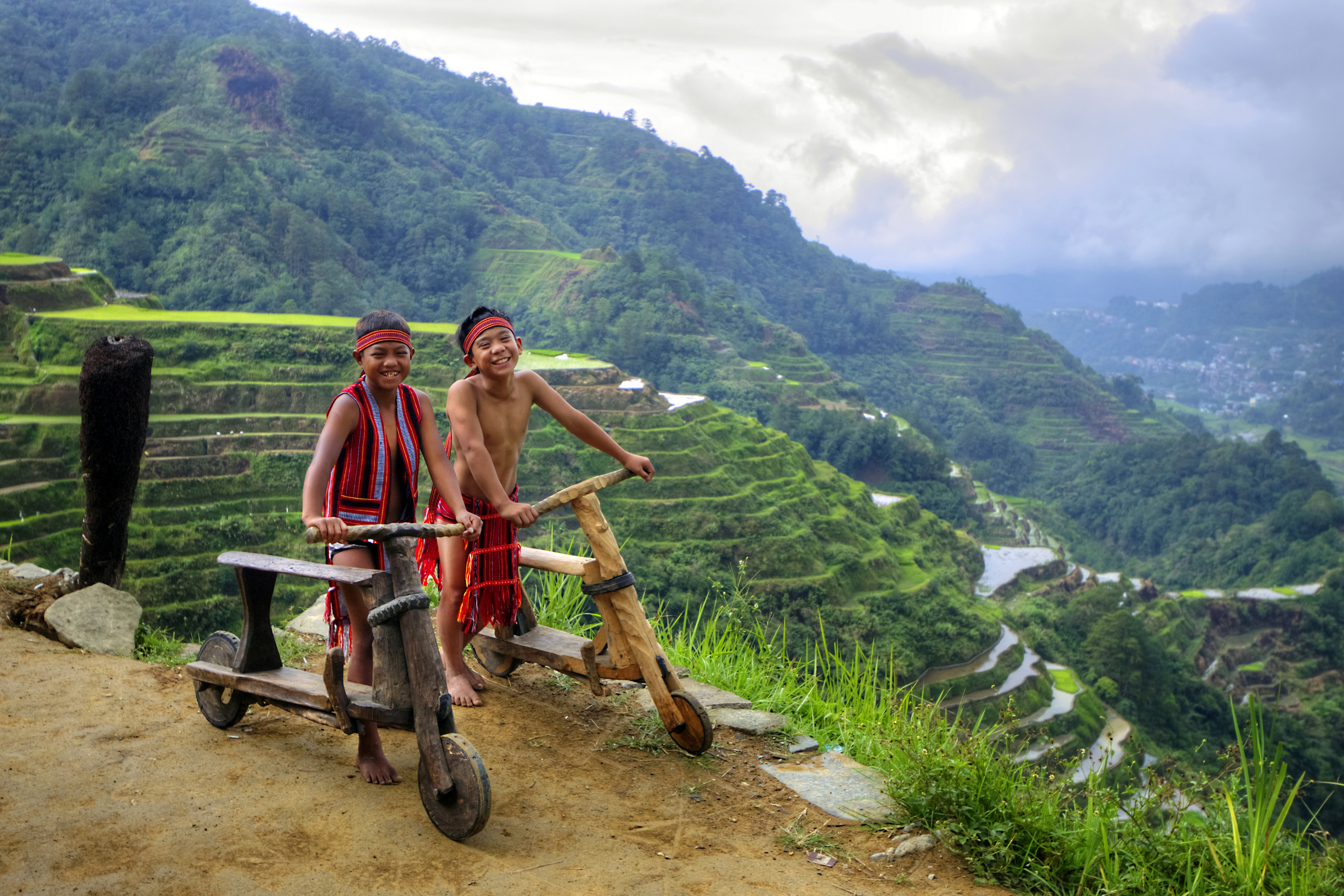
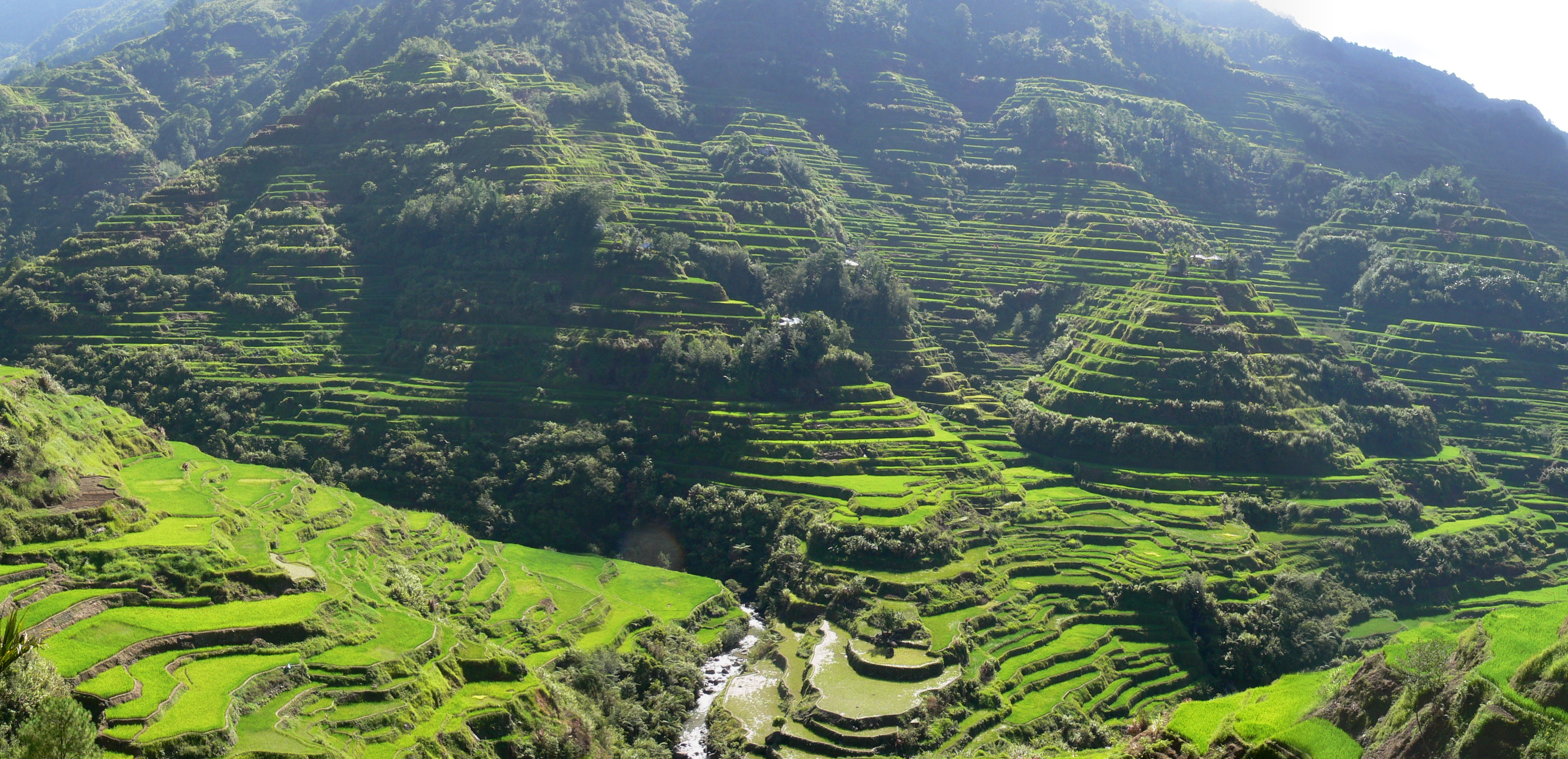
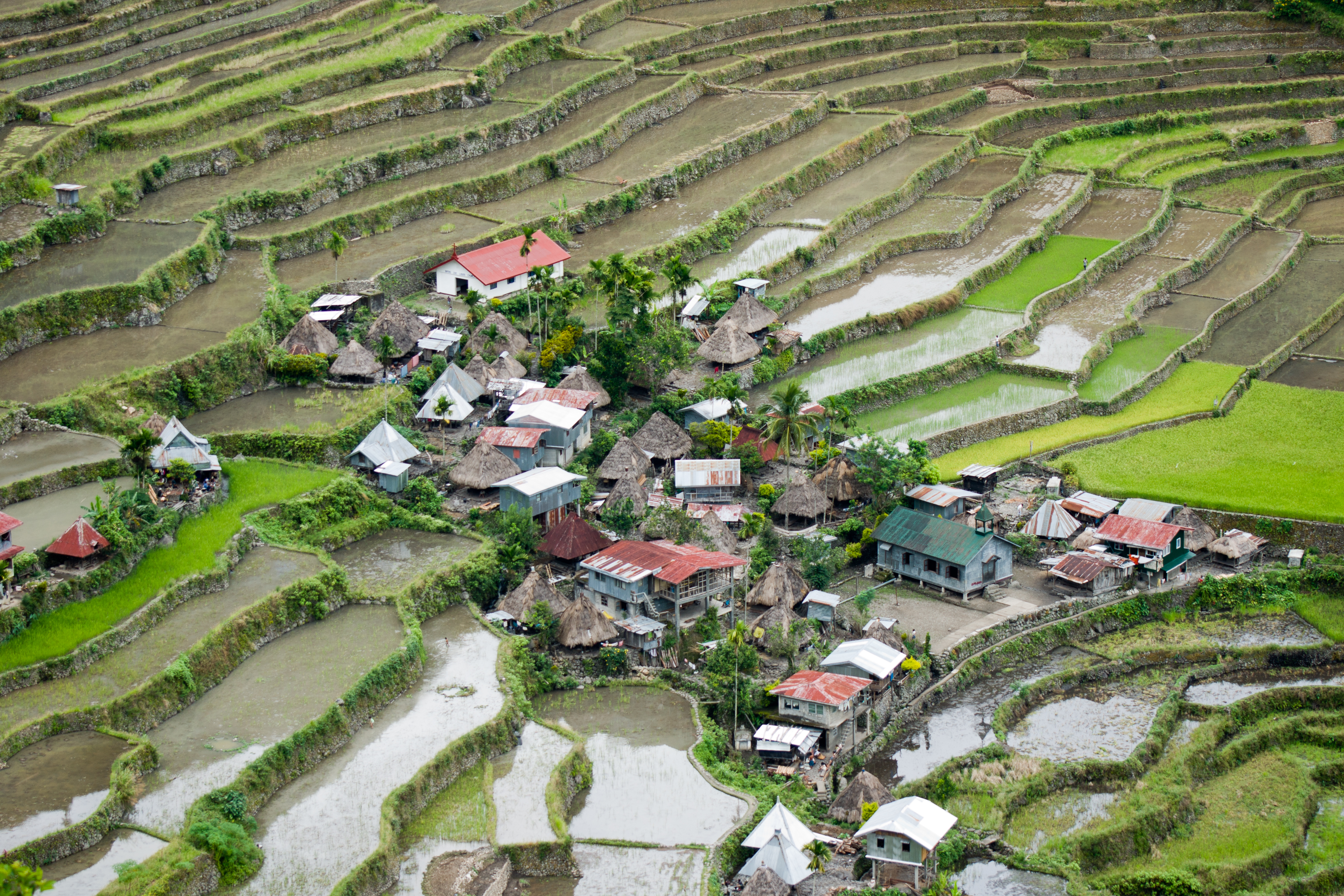
The Banaue Rice Terraces, a National Cultural Treasure of the Philippines and home to the Igorots, are sometimes referred to as the "Eighth Wonder of the World."

The Igorots may be roughly divided into two general subgroups: the larger group lives in the south, central and western areas, and is very adept at rice-terrace farming; the smaller group lives in the east and north. Prior to Spanish colonisation of the islands, the peoples now included under the term did not consider themselves as belonging to a single, cohesive ethnic group.

=== Balangao ===
The Balangao (endonym: iFarangao) predominantly inhabit the municipality of Natonin and portions of Paracelis in the eastern Mountain Province. While early colonial literature often conflated the Balangao with the neighboring Bontoc or Ifugao based on broad geographic generalizations, modern linguistic and cultural evidence identifies them as a distinct group with an independent ethnogenesis. Anthropological mapping from the early 20th century, notably by Albert Jenks (1905), explicitly defined the "Bontoc Culture Area" as centered on the Chico River, excluding the eastern territories that comprise the Balangao heartland. Both groups maintain distinct territorial boundaries and do not historically claim common tribal affiliation. The Balangao language is classified as a primary branch of the Nuclear Cordilleran group, making it a sister branch to the Bontoc, Kankanaey, and Ifugao complexes. According to the Northern Luzon languages family tree, this divergence represents an early split within the Central Cordilleran subgroup rather than a recent migration or dialectal variation. The Balangao language is distinguished by unique phonological features, such as the frequent use of the schwa (ë) and specific palatalization shifts present on its Ha'ki dialect. Balangao material culture is morphologically distinct from its western neighbors. Women wear the petay, a wrap-around skirt featuring alternating indigo and red horizontal stripes. Men wear the teyay, a vibrant red loincloth distinguished by yellow horizontal strips. The traditional communal dance, the torayan, is characterized by an accelerated, high-energy rhythmic beat and a rigid "T-pose" posture. This contrasts with the more fluid "eagle dances" or bird-mimicry performances common among the Bontoc and Kalinga tribes.

=== Bontoc ===
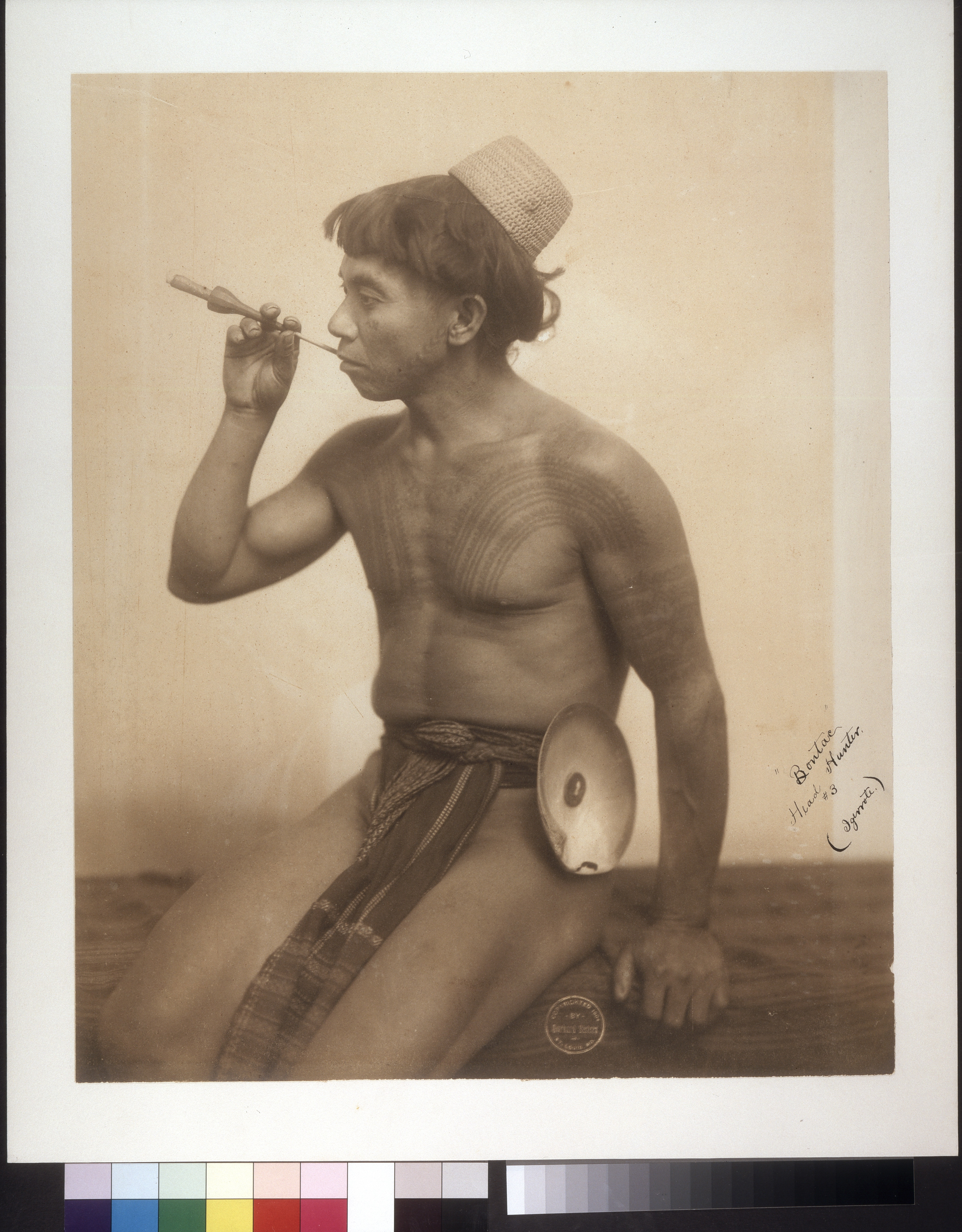
Bontoc man with chaklag (headhunter tattoo) and cigar holder, circa 1904.

The Bontok ethnolinguistic group can be found in the central and east portions of the Mountain Province. The Bontoc ethnic group is primarily situated in the municipality of Bontoc. However, the broader Bontoc culture area extends from the municipalities of Bontoc and Sadanga to include Barlig Central and Lias within the Barlig municipality.

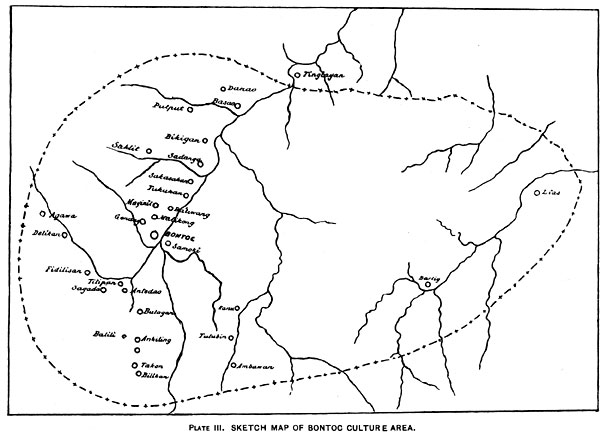
A 1905 sketch map showing the historical extent of the Bontoc culture area, including Barlig and Lias, while excluding the Balangao territories further east.

The Bontok live in a mountainous territory, particularly close to the Chico River and its tributaries. Mineral resources (gold, copper, limestone, gypsum) can be found in the mountain areas. Gold, in particular, has been traditionally extracted from the Bontoc municipality.

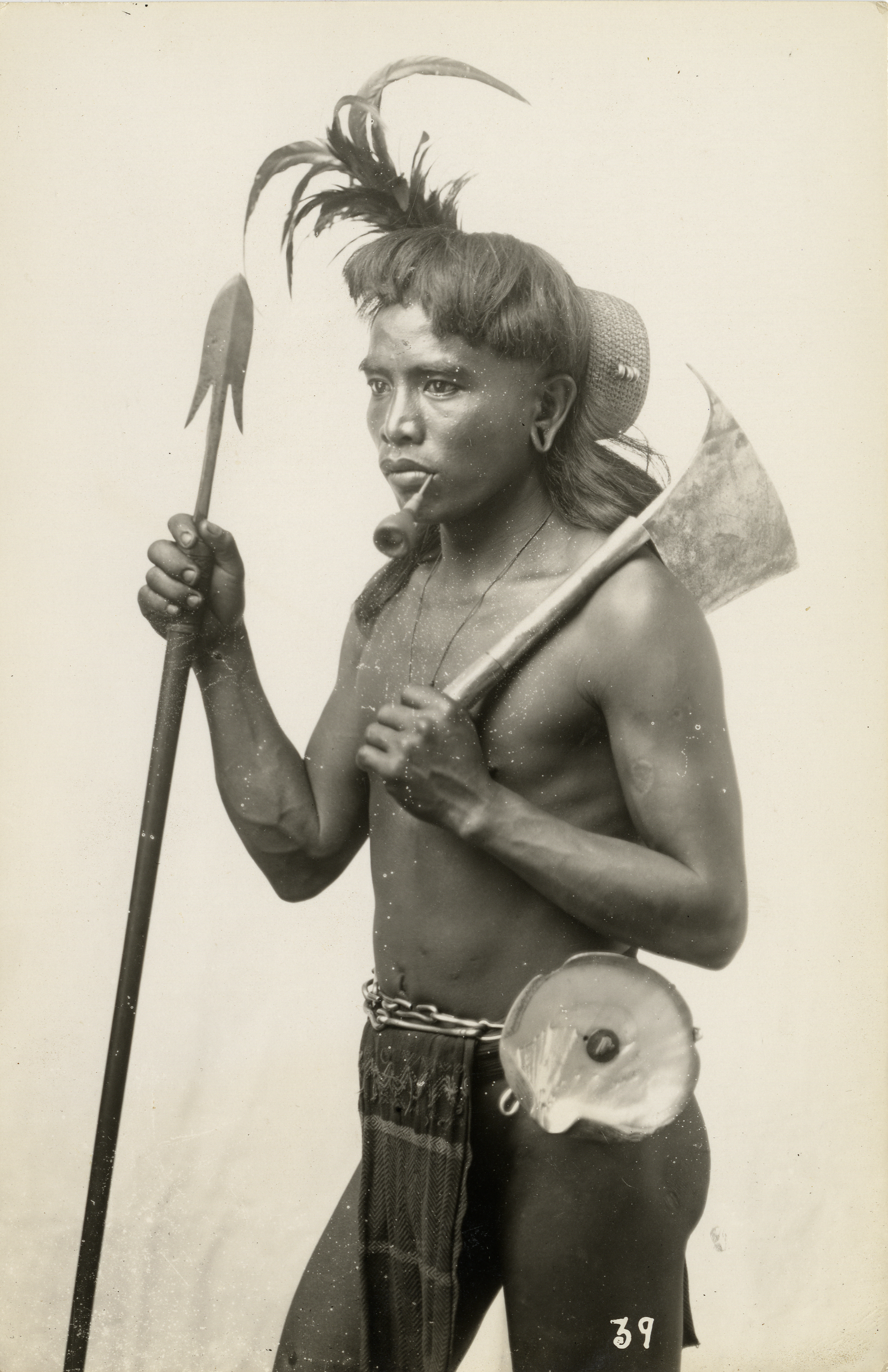
Bontoc man with falfeg (spear) and pinangas (battle axe), circa 1935.

The Chico River provides sand, gravel, and white clay, while the forests of Barlig and Sadanga within the area have rattan, bamboo and pine trees. They are the second largest group in the Mountain Province. The Bontoc live on the banks of the Chico River. They speak Bontoc and Ilocano. They formerly practiced head-hunting and had distinctive body tattoos. The Bontoc describe three types of tattoos: The chak-lag′, the tattooed chest of the head taker; pong′-o, the tattooed arms of men and women; and fa′-tĕk, for all other tattoos of both sexes. Women were tattooed on the arms only.

=== Ibaloi ===
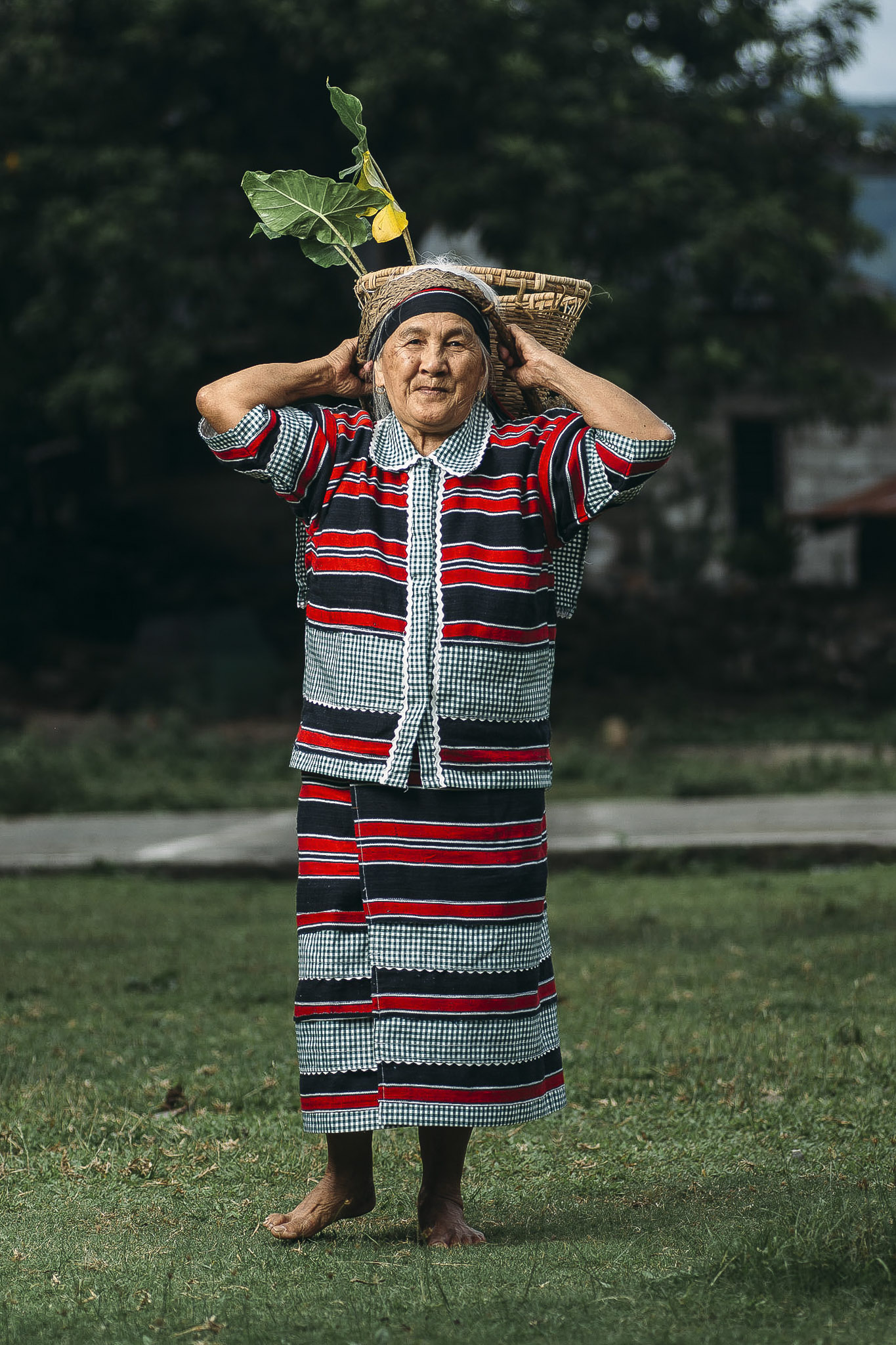
An elderly Ibaloi woman from Itogon, Benguet

The Ibaloi (also Ibaloy, Ibaluy, Nabaloi, Inavidoy, Inibaloi, Ivadoy) and Kalanguya (also Kallahan and Ikalahan) are one of the indigenous peoples of the Philippines who live mostly in the southern part of Benguet, located in the Cordillera of northern Luzon, the eastern part of La Union of Ilocos Region and Nueva Vizcaya in the Cagayan Valley region with a population of 209,338 as of 2020. They were traditionally an agrarian society. Many of the Ibaloi and Kalanguya people continue with their agriculture and rice cultivation.

Their native language belongs to the Malayo-Polynesian branch of the Austronesian languages family and is closely related to the Pangasinan language, primarily spoken in the province of Pangasinan, located southwest of Benguet.

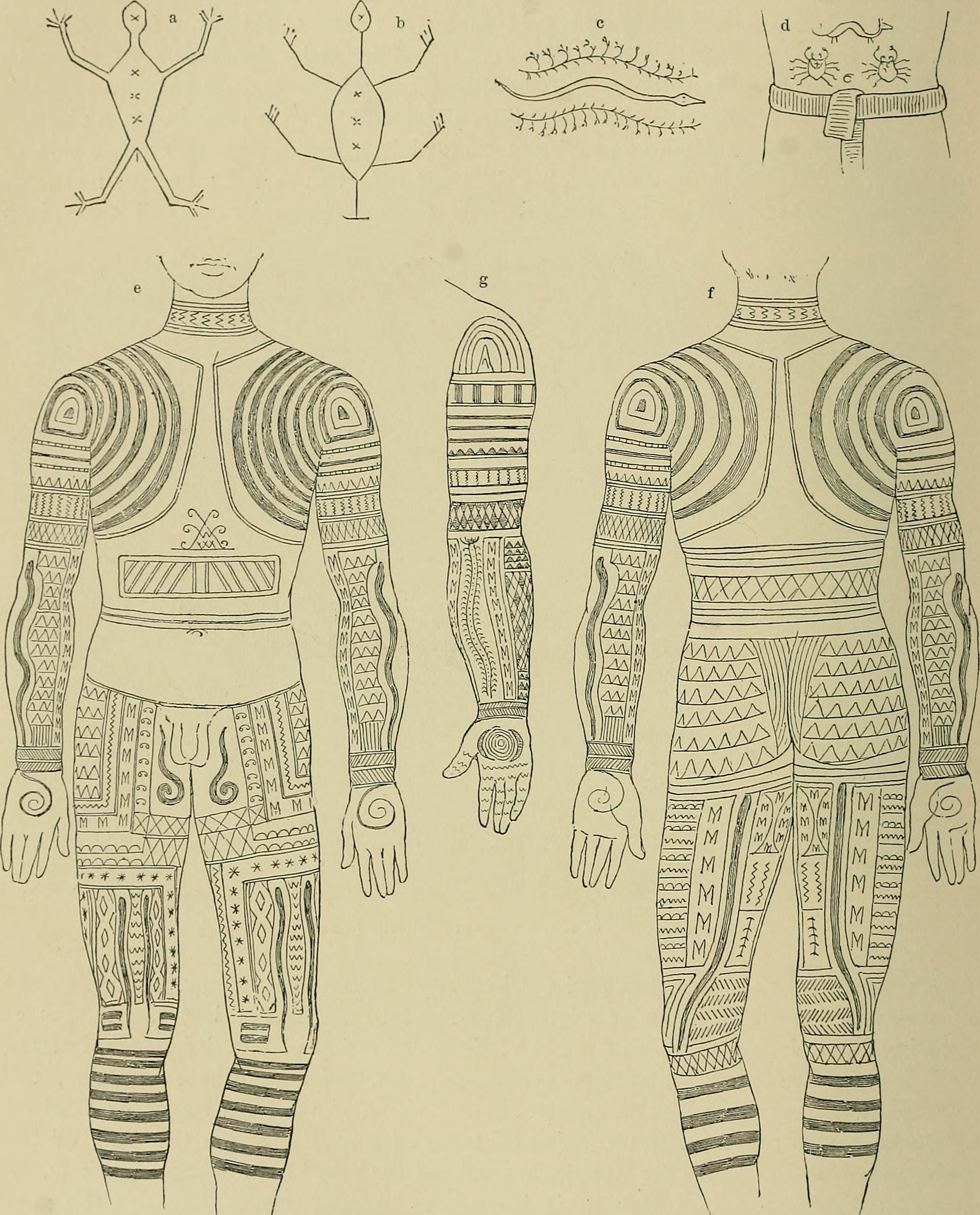
Illustration of Ibaloi burik tattoo pattern, circa 1896.

Baguio, the major city of the Cordillera, dubbed the "Summer Capital of the Philippines," is located in southern Benguet.

The largest feast of the Ibaloi is the Peshit or Pedit, a public feast mainly sponsored by people of prestige and wealth. Peshit can last for weeks and involves the killing and sacrifice of dozens of animals.

One of the more popular dances of the Ibaloi is the bendian, a mass dance participated in by hundreds of male and female dancers. Originally a victory dance in time of war, it evolved into a celebratory dance. It is used as entertainment (ad-adivay) in the cañao feasts, hosted by the wealthy class (baknang).

=== Ifugao ===
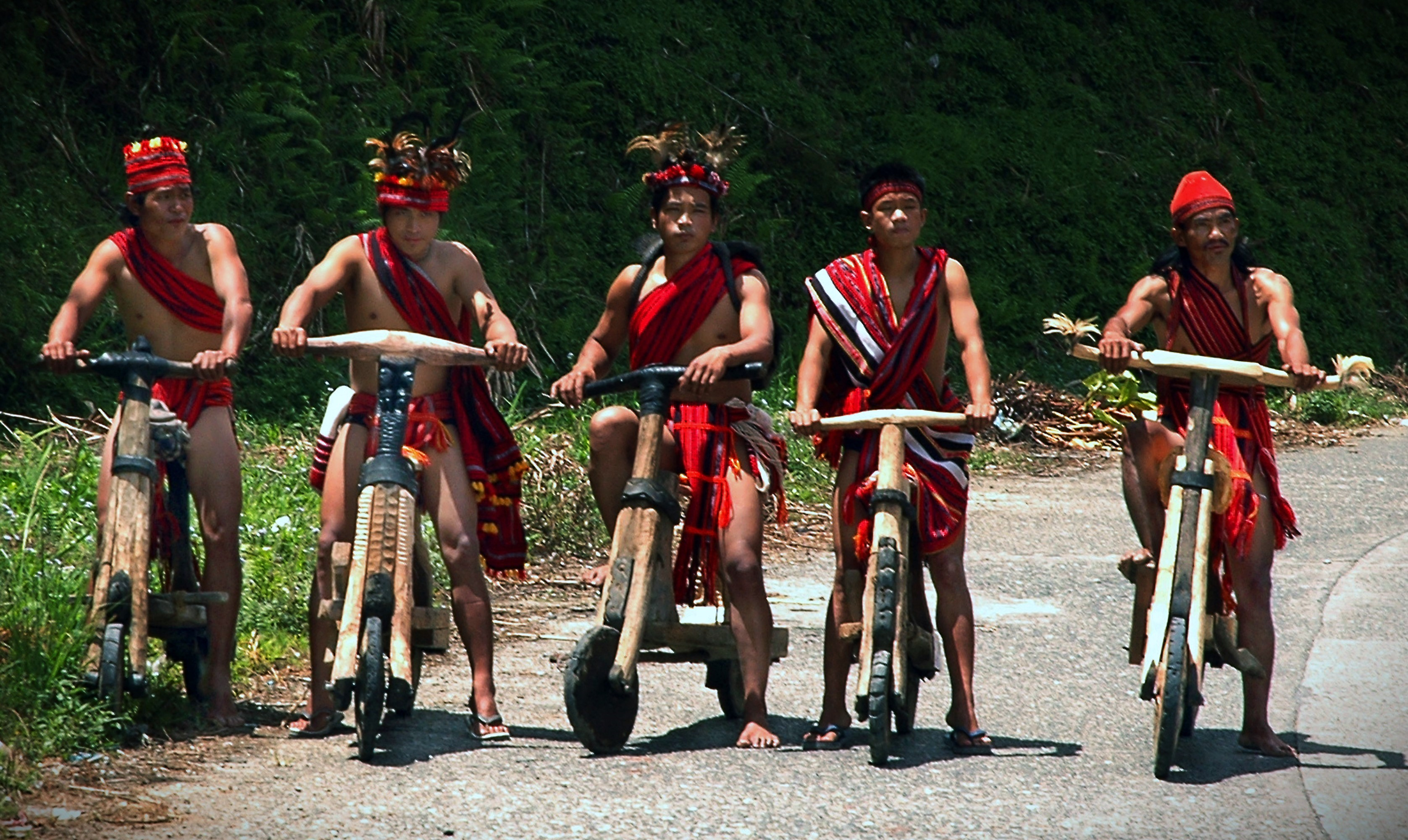
Ifugao men in traditional wanoh (loincloth) riding handcrafted wooden scooters.

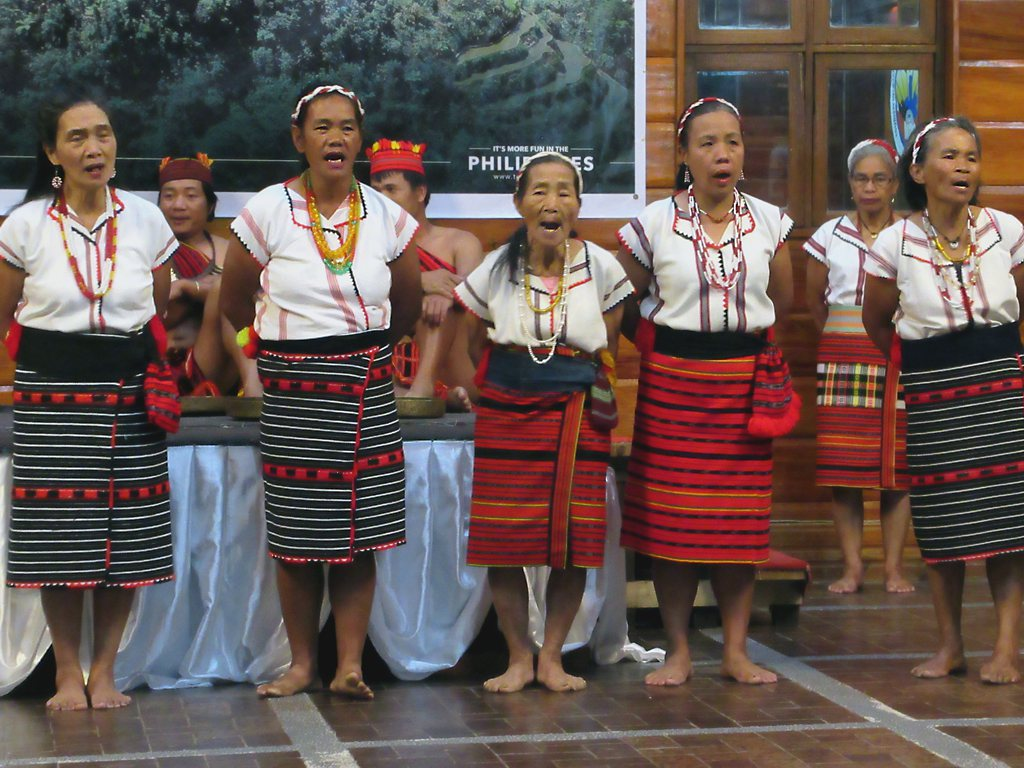
Ifugao women in traditional attire, wearing ampuyo (skirt), lamma (blouse), and ginuttu (belt).

Ifugaos are the people inhabiting Ifugao province. They come from the municipalities of Lagawe (Capital Town), Aguinaldo, Alfonso Lista, Asipulo, Banaue, Hingyon, Hungduan, Kiangan, Lamut, Mayoyao, and Tinoc. The province is one of the smallest provinces in the Philippines with an area of only 251,778 hectares, or about 0.8% of the total Philippine land area. It has a temperate climate and is rich in mineral and forest products.

The term "Ifugao" is derived from "ipugo" which means "earth people", "mortals" or "humans", as distinguished from spirits and deities. It also means "from the hill", as pugo means hill. The term Igorot or Ygolote was the term used by the Spanish colonial officials for mountain people. The Ifugaos, however, prefer the name Ifugao.

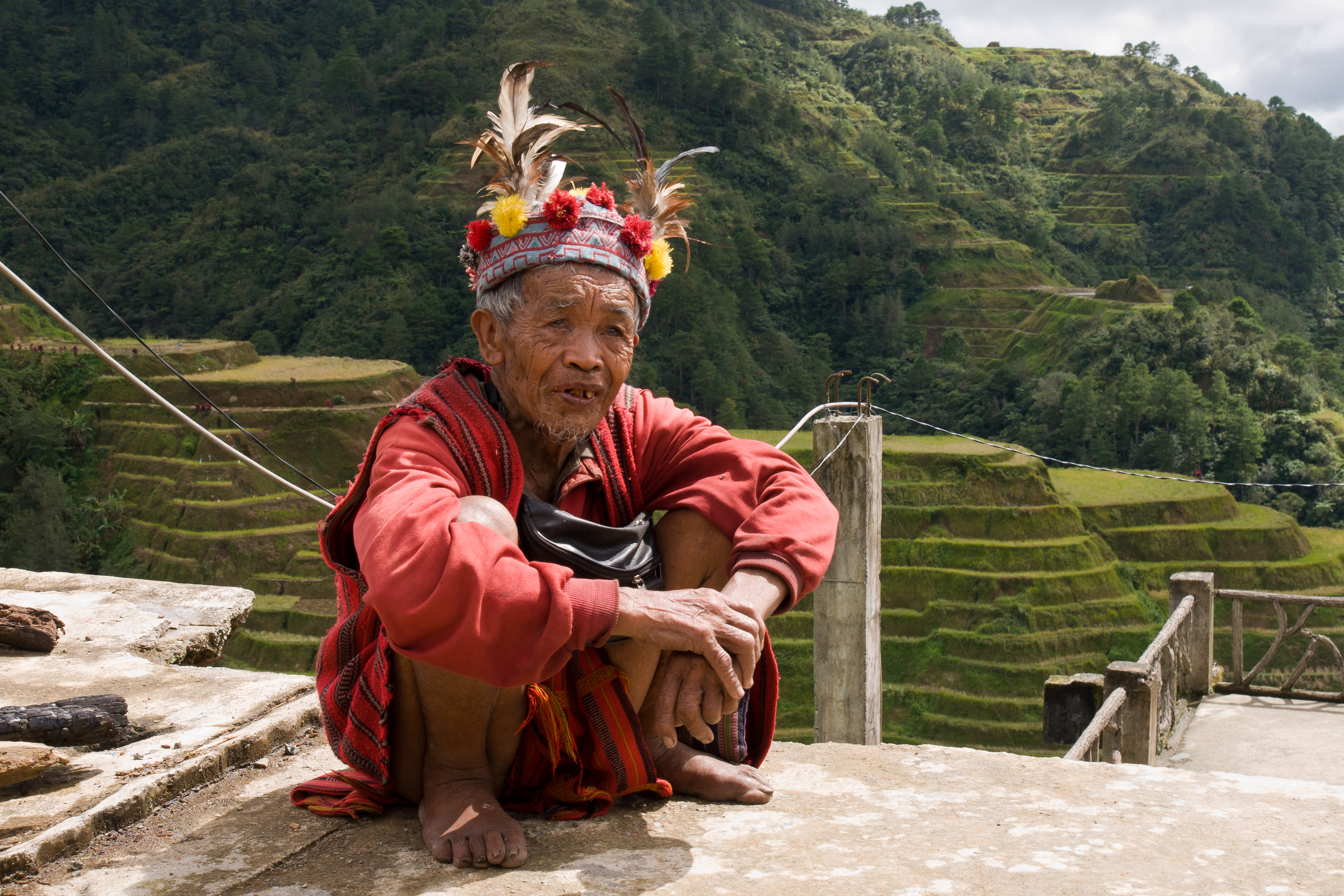
An elderly Ifugao man from Banaue

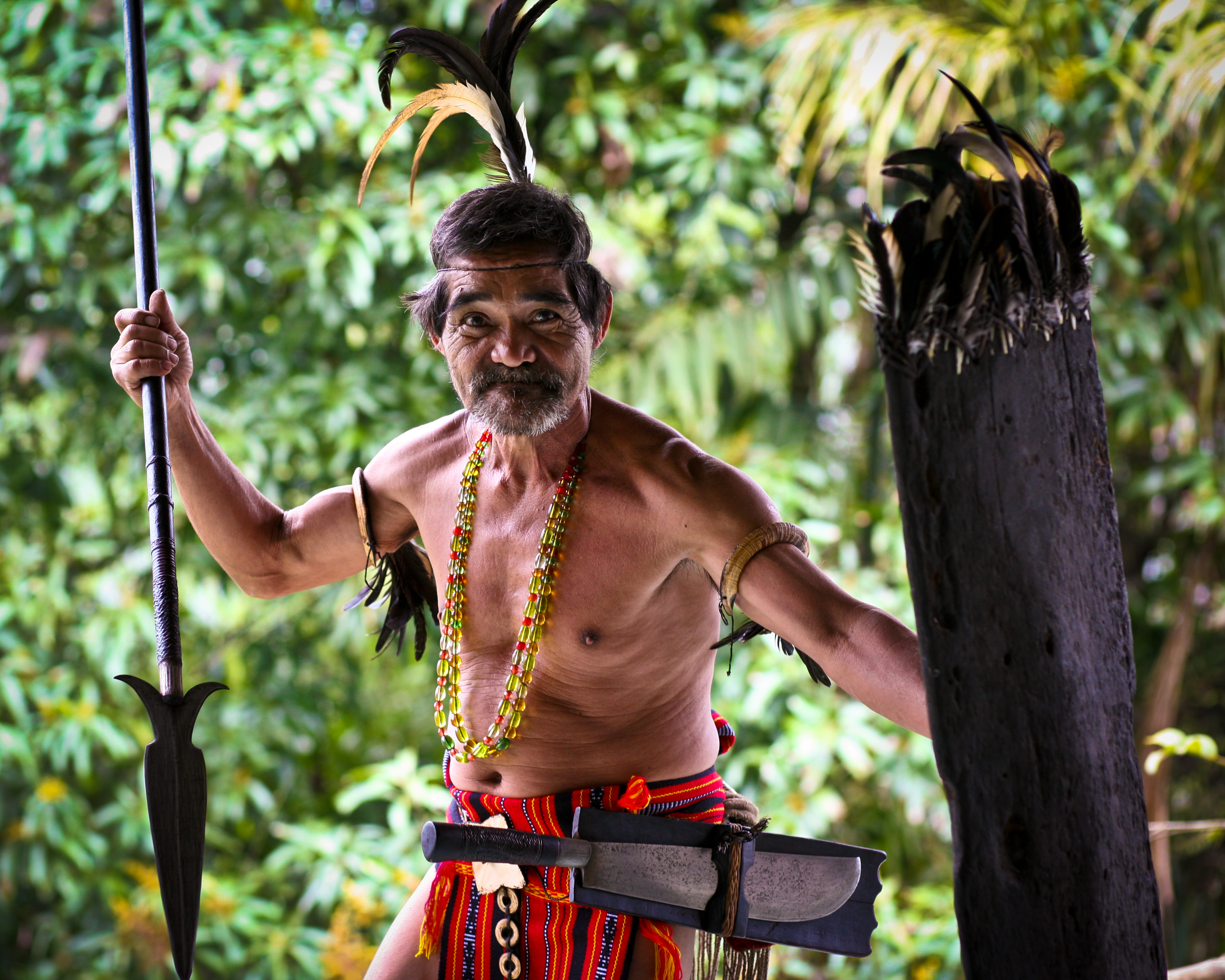
Ifugao warrior holding his armours

As of 2020, the population of the Ifugaos was counted to be 207,498. Although the majority of them are still in Ifugao province, some of them already transferred to Baguio, where they worked as woodcarvers, and to other parts of the Cordillera region. Significant population of the Ifugao people extend to Cagayan Valley Region or Region 2, particularly in Nueva Vizcaya, Quirino, and Isabela, due to migration and the existence of their ancestral domains in some parts of Nueva Vizcaya. The population of the Ifugao people in Region 2 , including the Kalanguya people are 178,993. They are divided into subgroups based on the differences in dialects, traditions, and design/color of costumes. The main subgroups are Ayangan, Kalangaya, and Tuwali.

Furthermore, the Ifugao society is divided into three social classes: the kadangyans or the aristocrats, the tagus or the middle class, and the nawotwots or the poor ones. The kadangyans sponsor the prestige rituals called hagabi and uyauy and this separates them from the tagus who cannot sponsor feasts but are economically well off. The nawotwots are those who have limited land properties and are usually hired by the upper classes to do work in the fields and other services.

=== Kalanguya (Ikalahan) ===
The Kalanguya or Ikalahan people is an ethnolinguistic group distributed amongst the mountain ranges of Sierra Madre, the Caraballo Mountains, and the eastern part of the Cordillera mountain range. The main population resides in the Nueva Vizcaya province, with Kayapa as the center. They are considered to be part of the Igorot (mountain people) but distinguish themselves with the name Ikalahan, the name taken from the forest trees that grow in the Caraballo Mountain.

They are among the least studied ethnic groups, thus their early history is unknown. However, Felix M. Keesing suggests that, like other groups in the mountains, they fled from the lowlands to escape Spanish persecution. The 2020 census of the Philippine Statistics Authority record the Kalanguya ethnolinguistic group to be more than 120,000.

=== Iwak ===
The Iwak people (Oak, Iguat, Iwaak, etc.) is a small ethnic group, which has a population of approximately 3,274, dispersed in small fenced-in villages which are usually enclaves in communities of surrounding major ethnic groups like the Ibaloy and Ikalahan. The characteristic village enclosing fences are sometimes composed in part of the houses with the front entry facing inward. Pig sties are part of the residential architecture. The Iwak are found principally in the municipalities of Boyasyas and Kayapa, province of Nueva Vizcaya. The subgroups are: (1) Lallang ni I'Wak, (2) Ibomanggi, (3) Italiti, (4) Alagot, (5) Itangdalan, (6) Ialsas, (7) Iliaban, (8)Yumanggi, (9) Ayahas, and (10) Idangatan. They speak the Iwaak language, which is a Nuclear Southern Cordilleran language which makes it closely related to Ibaloi, Kalanguya, and Karao.

=== Karao ===
The Karao (Karaw) tribe lives in the municipality of Bokod, Benguet. The ancestors of the Karaos are the Panuy-puys (puypuys), who migrated from Palileng, Bontoc to Diyang in Nueva Viscaya, and finally settled in Karao in the latter part of the nineteenth century. They speak the Karao language (also spelled Karaw). It is spoken in the Karao, Ekip, and Bokod areas of western Benguet Province, and in the southwestern corner of Ifugao Province. The language is named after the barangay of Karaw in Bokod municipality, Benguet.

=== Isneg ===
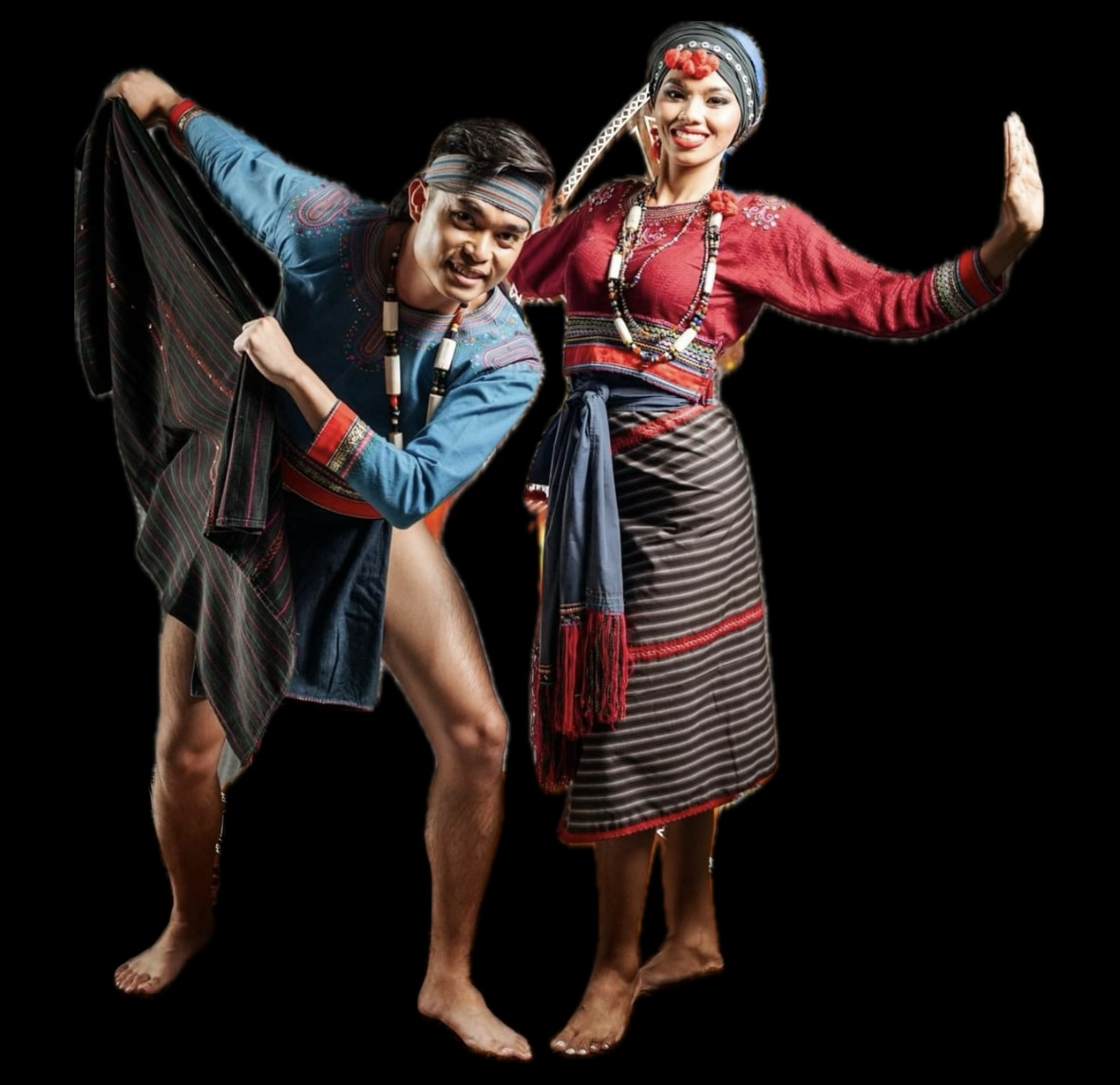
Isnag from Imanllod sub-tribe in their traditional attire

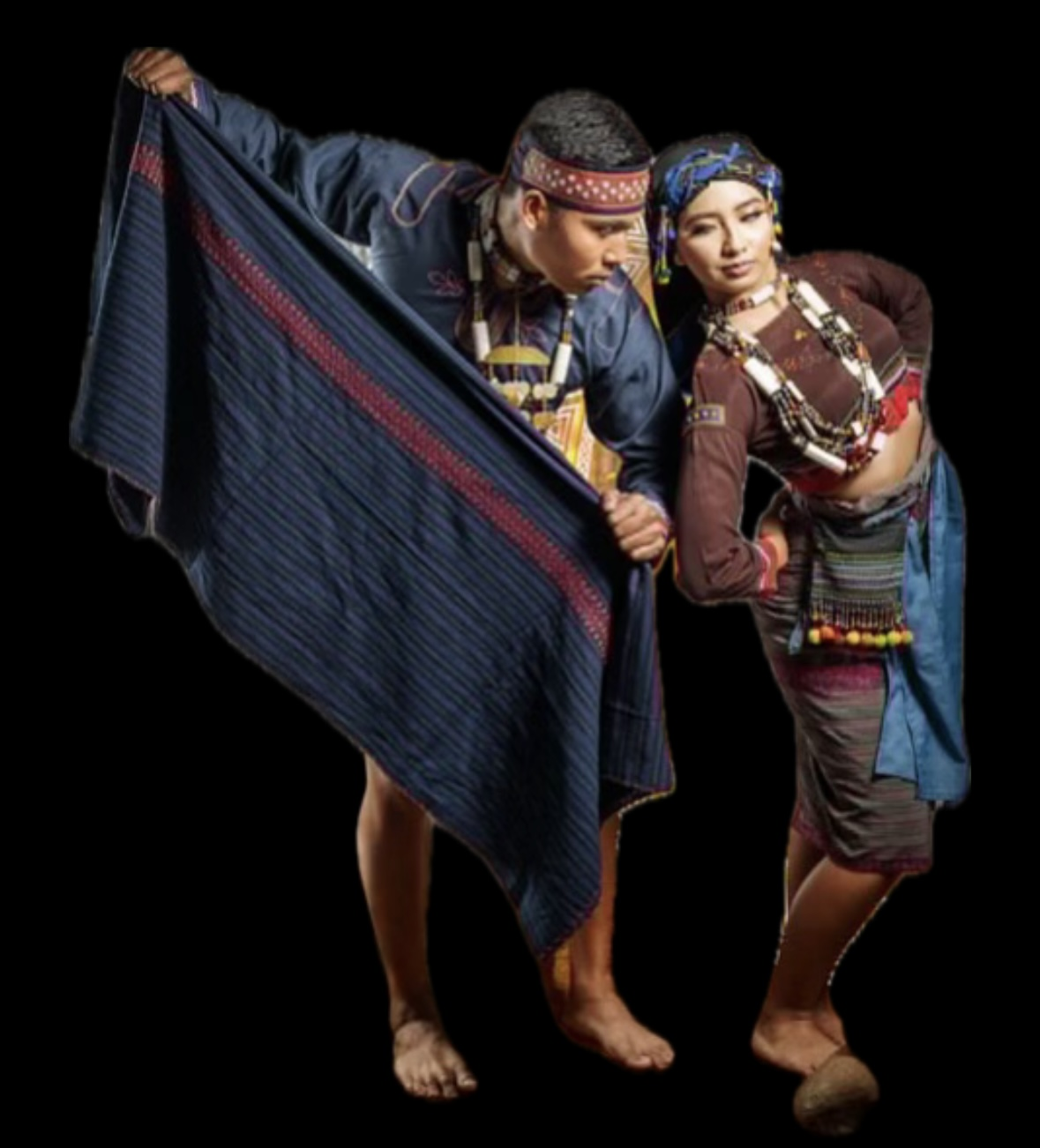
Isnag from Ymandaya sub-tribe in their traditional attire

The Isnag, also Isneg or Apayao, live at the northwesterly end of northern Luzon, in the upper half of the Cordillera province of Apayao. The term "Isneg" derives from itneg, meaning inhabitants of the Tineg River. Apayao derives from the battle cry Ma-ap-ay-ao as their hand is clapped rapidly over their mouth. They may also refer to themselves as Imandaya if they live upstream, or Imallod if they live downstream. The municipalities in the Isneg domain include Pudtol, Kabugao, Calanasan, Flora, Conner, Sta. Marcela, and Luna. Isnag populations also live in the eastern area of the province of Ilocos Norte, specifically the municipalities of Adams, Carasi, Marcos, Dingras, Vintar, Dumalneg and Solsona; and in the Northwestern part of the province of Cagayan, specifically the municipalities of Santa Praxedes, Claveria, Pamplona and Sanchez Mira. Two major river systems, the Abulog River and the Apayao River, run through Isnag country.

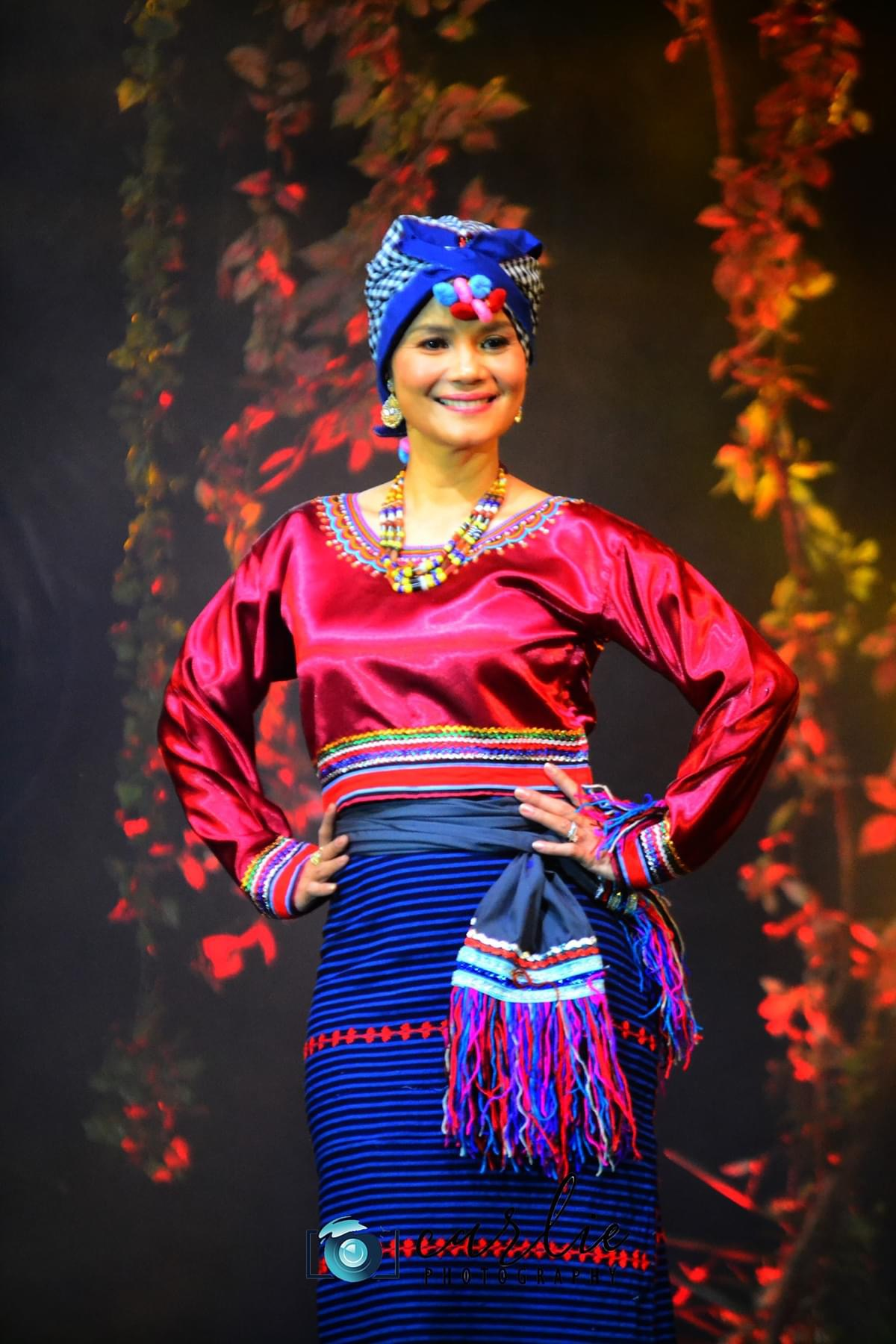
Isnag (Apayao) woman in traditional attire, wearing sinulpo (upper garment) and aken (wraparound cloth).

Jars of basi are half-buried in the ground within a small shed, abulor, constructed of 4 posts and a shed. This abulor is found within the open space, linong or sidong, below their houses (balay). They grow upland rice, while also practicing swidden farming and fishing.

Say-am was an important ceremony after a successful headhunting, or other important occasions, hosted by the wealthy, and lasting one to five days or more. Dancing, singing, eating, and drinking mark the feast, and Isnegs wear their finest clothes. The shaman, Anituwan, prays to the spirit Gatan, before the first dog is sacrificed, if a human head had not been taken, and offered at the sacred tree, ammadingan.

On the last day, a coconut is split in honor of the headhunter guardian, Anglabbang.The Pildap is an equivalent say-am but hosted by the poor. Conversion to Christianity grew after 1920, and today, the Isnegs are divided in their religious beliefs, with some still being animistic.

=== Itneg (Tinguian) ===
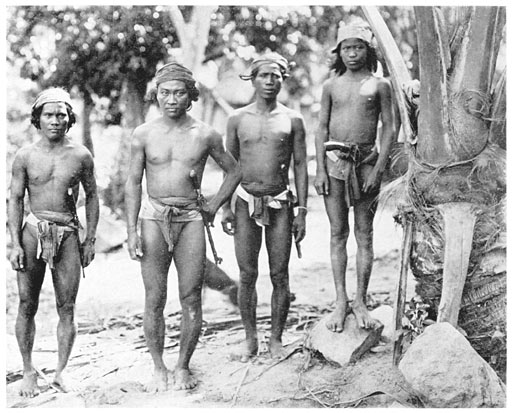
Itneg (Tinguian) men of Sallapadan, Abra, circa 1922

Otherwise known as Itineg, meaning "people living near the Tineg River" (exonyms: Tinguian, Tinguianes, Itinek, Mandaya, Tingian), they live in the mountainous area of Abra and Ilocos Sur in northwestern Luzon who descended from immigrants from Kalinga, Apayao, and the Northern Kankana-ey; they also live in Nueva Era, Ilocos Norte. They refer to themselves as Itneg, though the Spaniards called them Tingguian when they came to the Philippines because they are mountain dwellers.

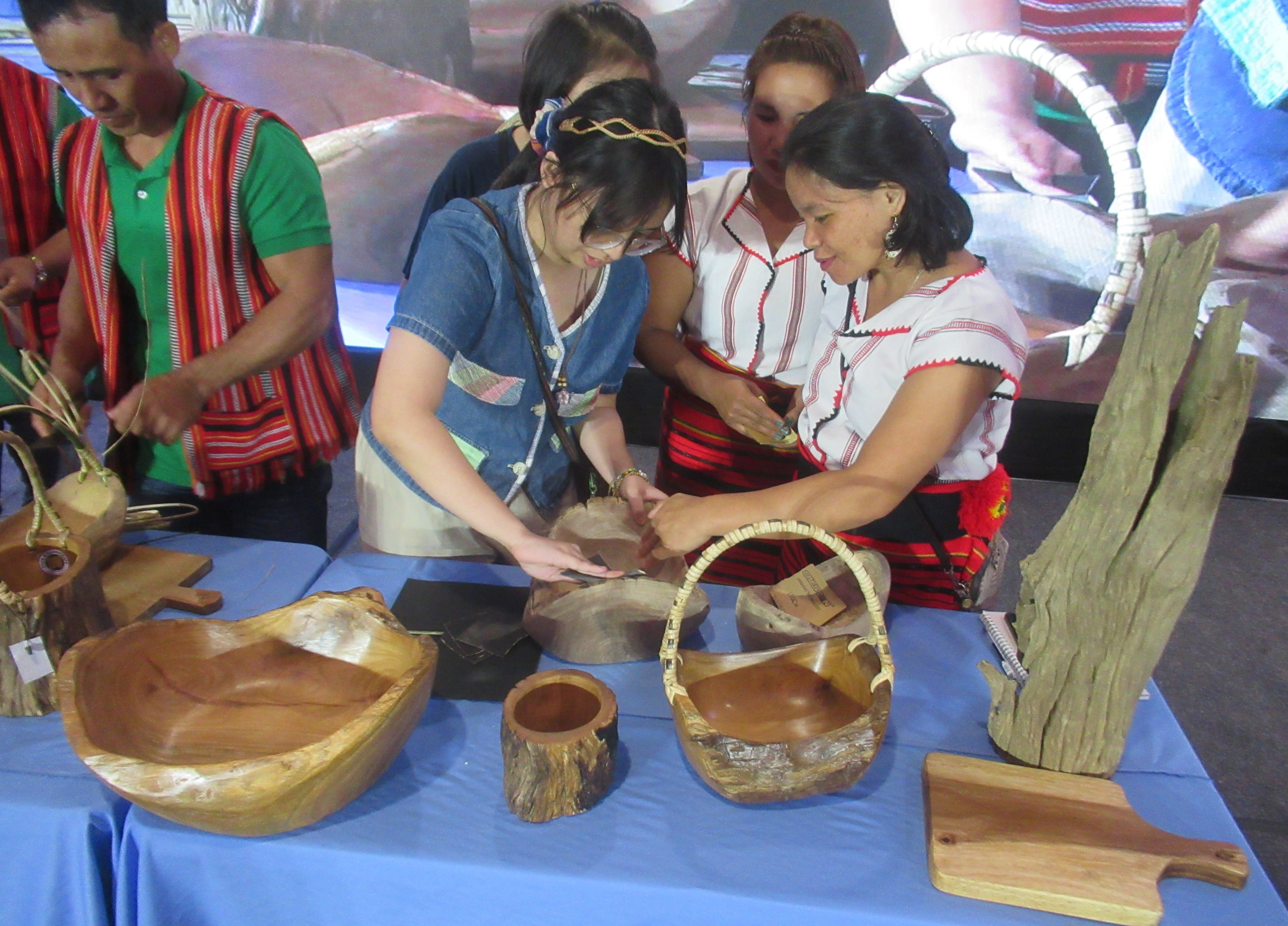
Itneg (Tinguian) artisans demonstrating traditional handicraft-making techniques

As of 2020, The total population of the Itnegs are 100,806. The Tingguians are further divided into 11 distinct subgroups which are the Adasen, Balatok, Banao, Belwang, Binongan, Gobang, Inlaud, Mabaka, Maeng, Masadiit and Moyadan. Wealth and material possessions (such as Chinese jars, copper gongs called gangsa, beads, rice fields, and livestock) determine the social standing of a family or person, as well as the hosting of feasts and ceremonies. Despite the divide of social status, there is no sharp distinction between rich (baknang) and poor. Wealth is inherited but the society is open for social mobility of the citizens by virtue of hard work. Medium are the only distinct group in their society, but even then it is only during ceremonial periods.

=== Kalinga ===
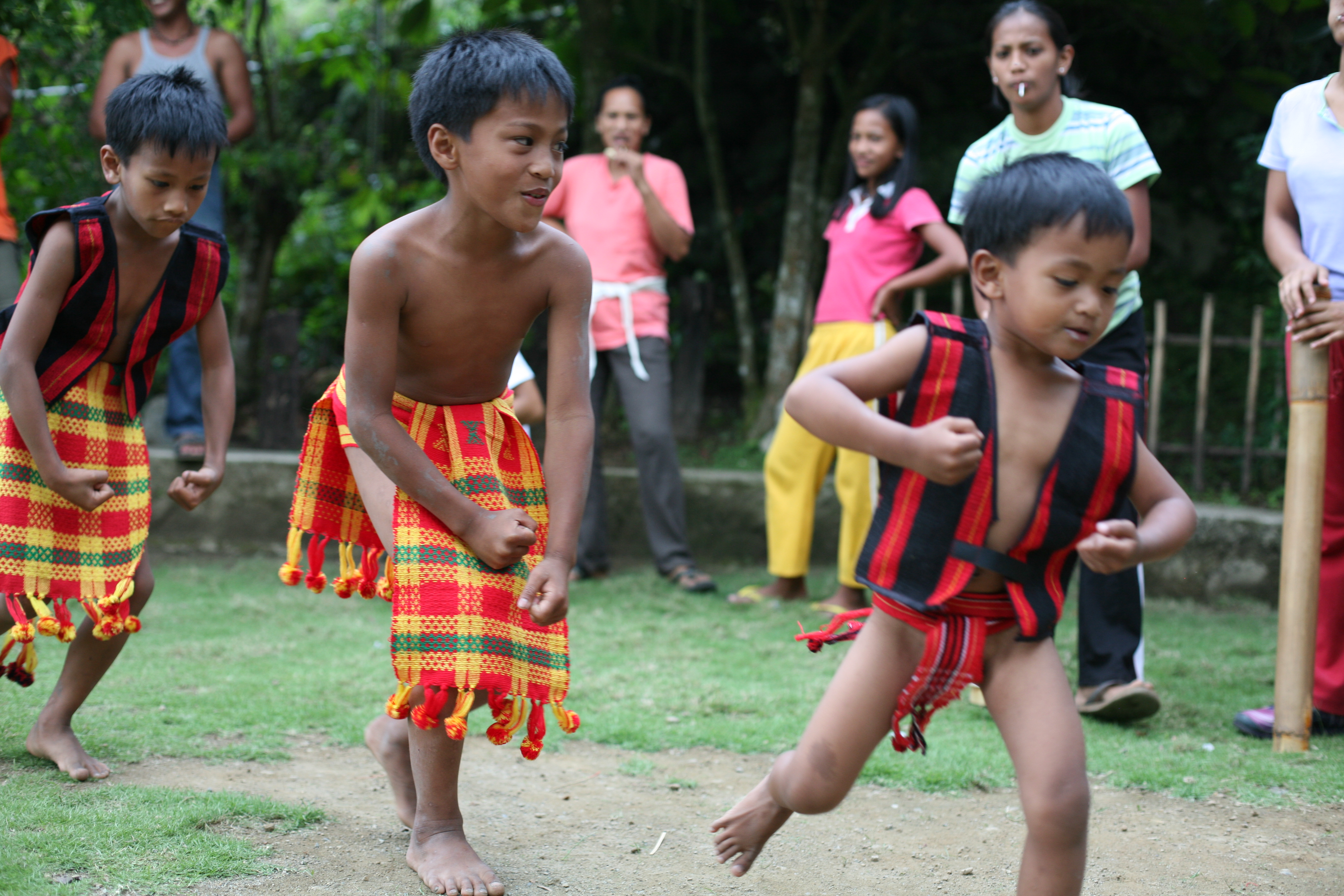
Young boys from Kalinga perform the muscle dance

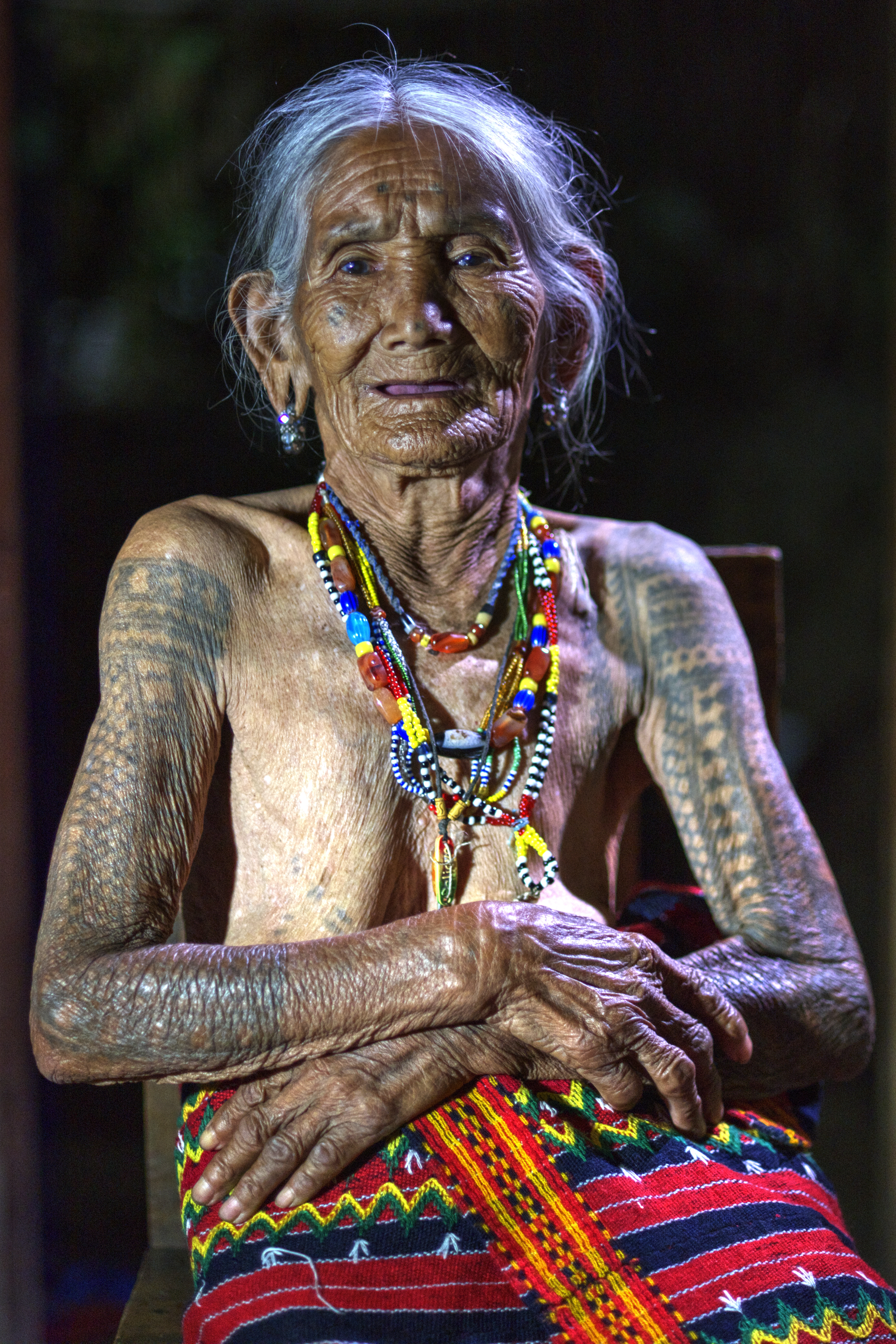
Kalinga woman from Buscalan, Tinglayan adorned with whatok (tattoo), symbolizing beauty and cultural identity.

The Kalingas are mainly found in Kalinga province which has an area of 3,282.58 sq.km. Some of them, however, already migrated to Mountain Province, Apayao, Cagayan, and Abra. As of 2020, they were counted to be 212,983, not including those who have migrated outside the Cordillera region.

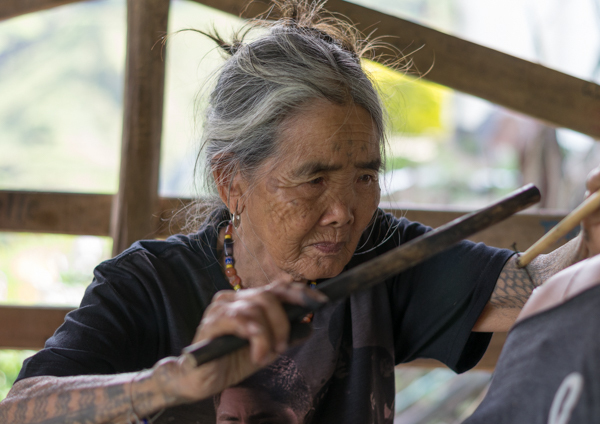
Apo Whang-od applying traditional Kalinga tattoos using the characteristic Austronesian tattooing tools – the hafted needle and the mallet

Kalinga territory includes floodplains of Tabuk, and Rizal, plus the Chico River. Gold and copper deposits are common in Pasil and Balbalan. Tabuk was settled in the 12th century, and from there other Kalinga settlements spread, practicing wet rice (papayaw) and swidden (uwa) cultivation. Kalinga houses (furoy, buloy, fuloy, phoyoy, biloy) are either octagonal for the wealthy, or square, and are elevated on posts (a few as high as 20–30 feet), with a single room. Other buildings include granaries (alang) and field sheds (sigay).

The name Kalinga came from the Ibanag and Gaddang term kalinga, which means headhunter. Edward Dozier divided Kalinga geographically into three sub-cultures and geographical position: Balbalan (north); Pasil, Lubuagan, and Tinglayan (south); and Tanudan (east). Teodoro Llamzon divided the Kalinga based on their dialects: Guinaang, Lubuagan, Punukpuk, Tabuk, Tinglayan, and Tanudan.

=== Kankanaey ===
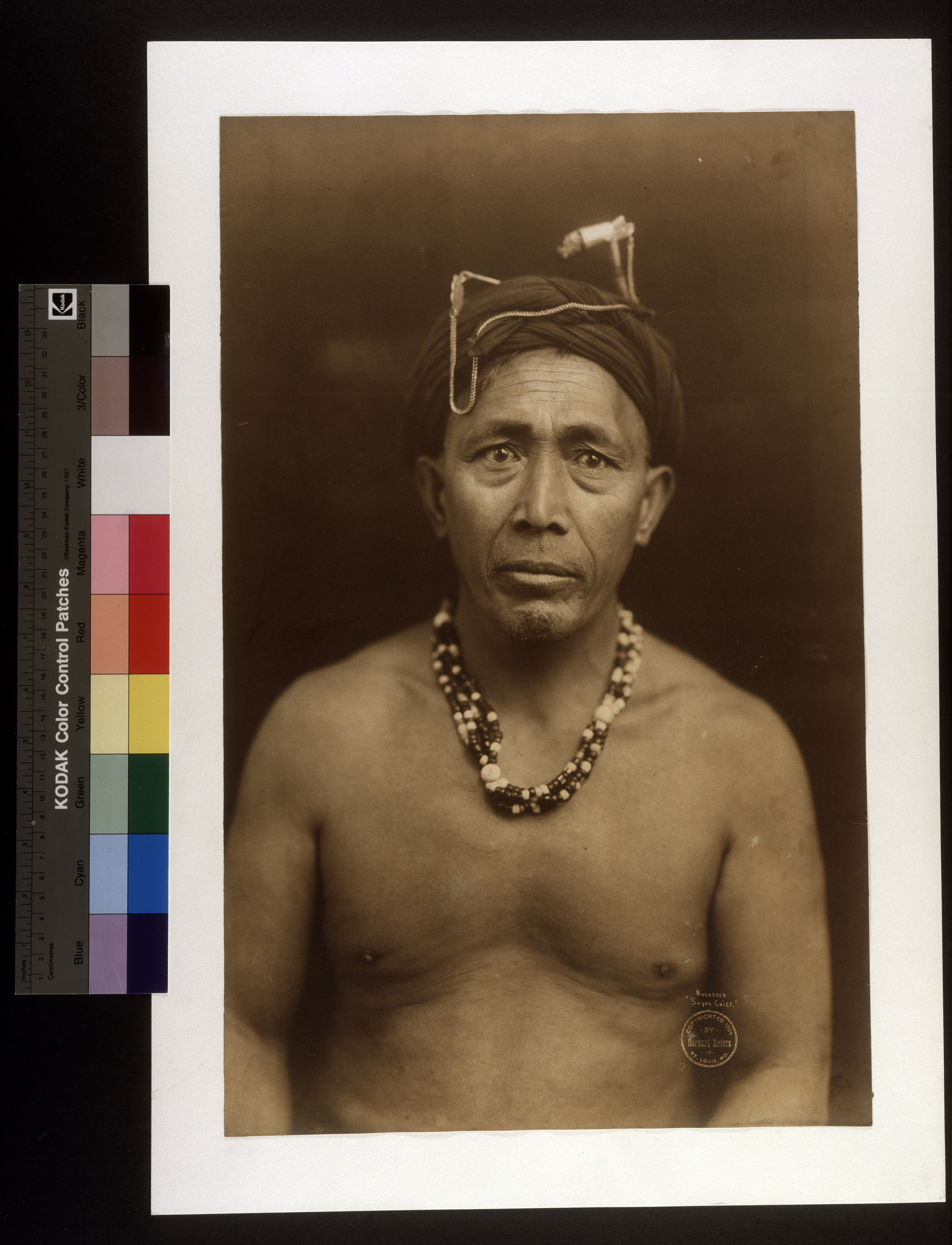
A Kankanaey chief from the town of Suyoc, in Mankayan, Benguet (taken c. 1904).

The Kankanaey people (Kankanai or Kankana-ey) are native to Western Mountain Province, northern Benguet, northeastern La Union, and southeastern Ilocos Sur, with a population of 466,970 as of 2020. The Kankanaey have two distinct sub-groups: the Northern Kankanaey, or Applai, who live in Sagada and Besao in western Mountain Province and constitute a linguistic group, and the Southern Kankanaey, who live in the mountainous regions of Mountain Province and Benguet, specifically in the municipalities of Tadian, Bauko, Sabangan, Bakun, Kibungan, Buguias, and Mankayan.

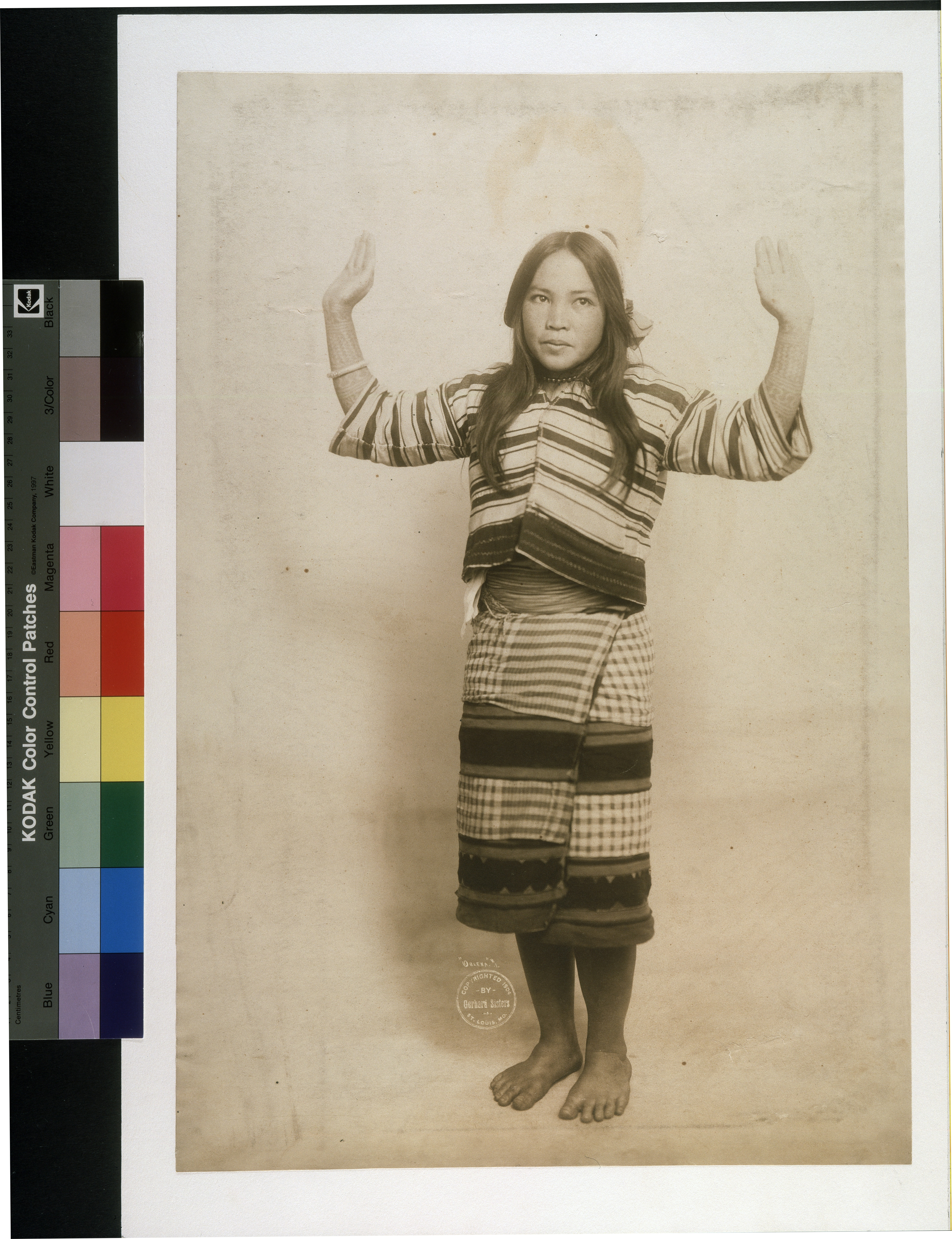
Kankanaey woman posing for the tayaw dance, circa 1904, in Suyoc.

Kankanaey houses include the two-story innagamang, the larger binangi, the cheaper tinokbob, and the elevated tinabla. Their granaries (agamang) are elevated to avoid rats. Two other institutions of the Kankanaey of Mountain Province are the dap-ay, or the men's dormitory and civic center, and the ebgan, or the girls' dormitory.

Kankanaey's major dances include tayaw, pat-tong, takik (a wedding dance), and balangbang. The tayaw is a community dance that is usually done in weddings. Pattong, also a community dance from Mountain Province which every municipality has its own style, while Balangbang is the dance's modern term. There are also some other dances like the sakkuting, pinanyuan (another wedding dance) and bogi-bogi (courtship dance).

For the neighboring groups of the eastern slopes like Ilongot and Isinai, see Cagayan Valley and Caraballo ethnolinguistic groups

== Ethnic groups by linguistic classification ==
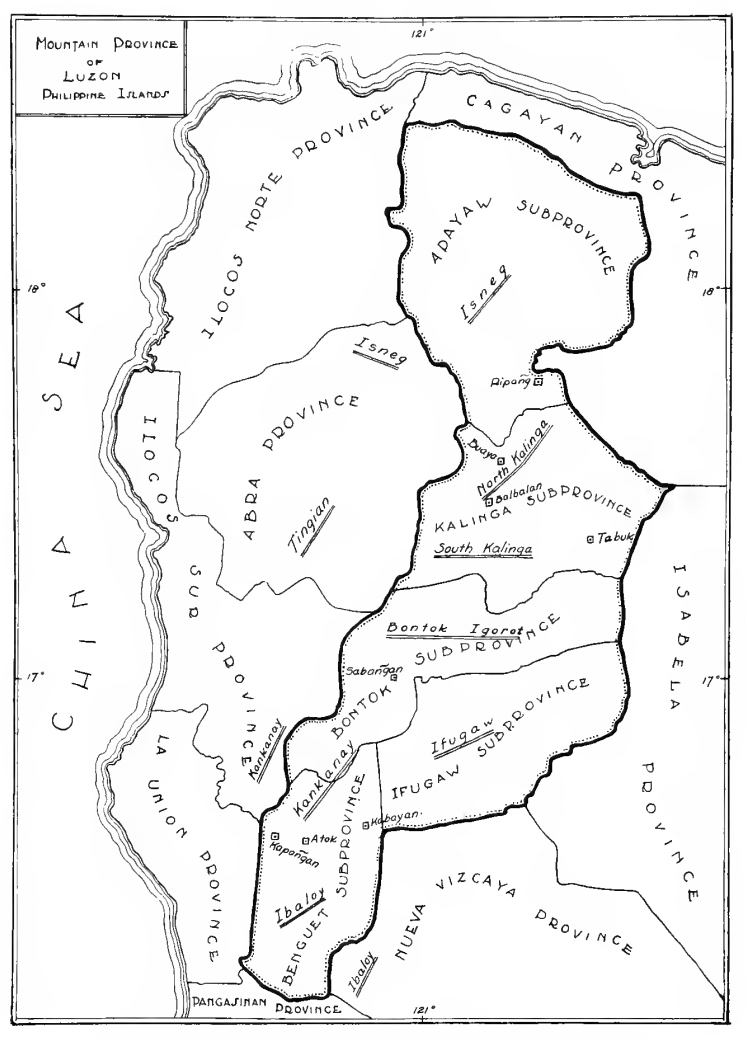
Map of various Cordilleran tribes (1929)

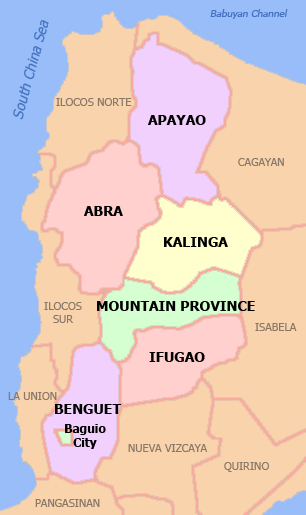
Political map of the Cordillera Administrative Region

Below is a list of northern Luzon ethnic groups organized by linguistic classification.

- Northern Luzon languages
  - Ilokano (Ilocos Norte, Ilocos Sur, and La Union)
  - Northern Cordilleran
    - Isneg (northern Apayao)
    - Ibanagic
      - Ibanag (Cagayan and Isabela)
      - Gaddangic
        - Gaddang (Nueva Vizcaya and Isabela)
        - Ga'dang (Paracelis, Mountain Province; Alfonso Lista, Ifugao; Tabuk City, Kalinga Province; and Aurora)
        - Itawis (southern Cagayan and Apayao)
        - Yogad (Isabela)
  - Central Cordilleran
    - Isinai (northern Nueva Vizcaya, north Nueva Ecija, northwest Aurora)
    - Kalinga–Itneg
      - Kalinga (Kalinga; Banao, Abra; Barangay Maducayan and Saliok, Natonin, Mountain Province)
      - Itneg (Abra)
    - Nuclear
      - Ifugao (Ifugao, Nueva Vizcaya, Quirino)
      - Balangao (Natonin, Mountain Province; some parts of Paracelis)
      - Bontok (Bontoc, Sadanga, Barlig Mountain Province)
      - Kankanaey (western Mountain Province, northern Benguet)
- Southern Cordilleran
  - Ilongot (Bugkalot) (eastern Nueva Vizcaya; Nagtipunan and Maddela Quirino, north Nueva Ecija, northwest Aurora)
  - West Southern Cordilleran
    - Pangasinan (Pangasinan)
  - Nuclear Southern Cordilleran
    - Ibaloi (southern Benguet, east La Union, west Nueva Vizcaya)
    - Karao (Karao, Bokod, Benguet)
    - Kallahan/Kalanguya (eastern Benguet, Ifugao, northwestern Nueva Vizcaya, north Nueva Ecija)
      - Kalanguya Keley-i
      - Kalanguya Kayapa
      - Kalanguya Tinoc

Different Igorot groups speak the Ilocano language as a lingua franca for better communication amongst their people because many Cordilleran languages have varying dialect continuums through different tribes and different localities. They also utilize the Ilocano language to communicate with ethnic Ilocanos and other non-Ilocano second-language speakers such as the Ibanags. Along with Ilocano, they also speak Tagalog and English as lingua francas.

== Genetic studies ==
The Kankanaey (an Igorot ethnic group) from the Mountain Province of the Northern Philippines), and by extension other indigenous Cordillera groups, descend almost entirely from the ancient Austronesian expansion originating in Taiwan around 3000-2000 BC. ADMIXTURE analyses show their ancestry is remarkably homogeneous, with nearly 100% of their genetic makeup matching the "k6" component most closely shared with Taiwan's indigenous Ami and Atayal peoples. This genetic profile shows minimal admixture with other Asian populations over millennia.

== Igorot diaspora ==
There are Igorot minorities outside their homeland. Outside the Cordillera Administrative Region, they reside in neighboring provinces of Ilocos region, Cagayan Valley, Central Luzon (particularly Nueva Ecija & Aurora), Metro Manila and Calabarzon, (where Igorot Village is located in Cainta, Rizal) and Bicol Region.

In Visayas, Igorots also form minority communities in Aklan, Iloilo, Negros Occidental, Negros Oriental, Cebu, Siquijor, Bohol, Biliran and Leyte.

Igorots are also found as a minority in several areas Mindanao, setting communities in Agusan del Norte, Tagum City, Davao City, Digos City (Igorot Village is also found in the mountainous area in the city), few other parts of Davao del Sur, Davao de Oro, North Cotabato, South Cotabato, Sultan Kudarat, Lanao del Norte and Bukidnon. Most of them are soldiers, policemen and government officials who are temporarily deployed in the area, but many have settled permanently as civilians retired from their posts and intermarried with the Mindanaoans of various ethnicities. There is an organization for Igorot residents of Mindanao.

Igorots can also be found in other countries, mostly as overseas workers.

== History ==
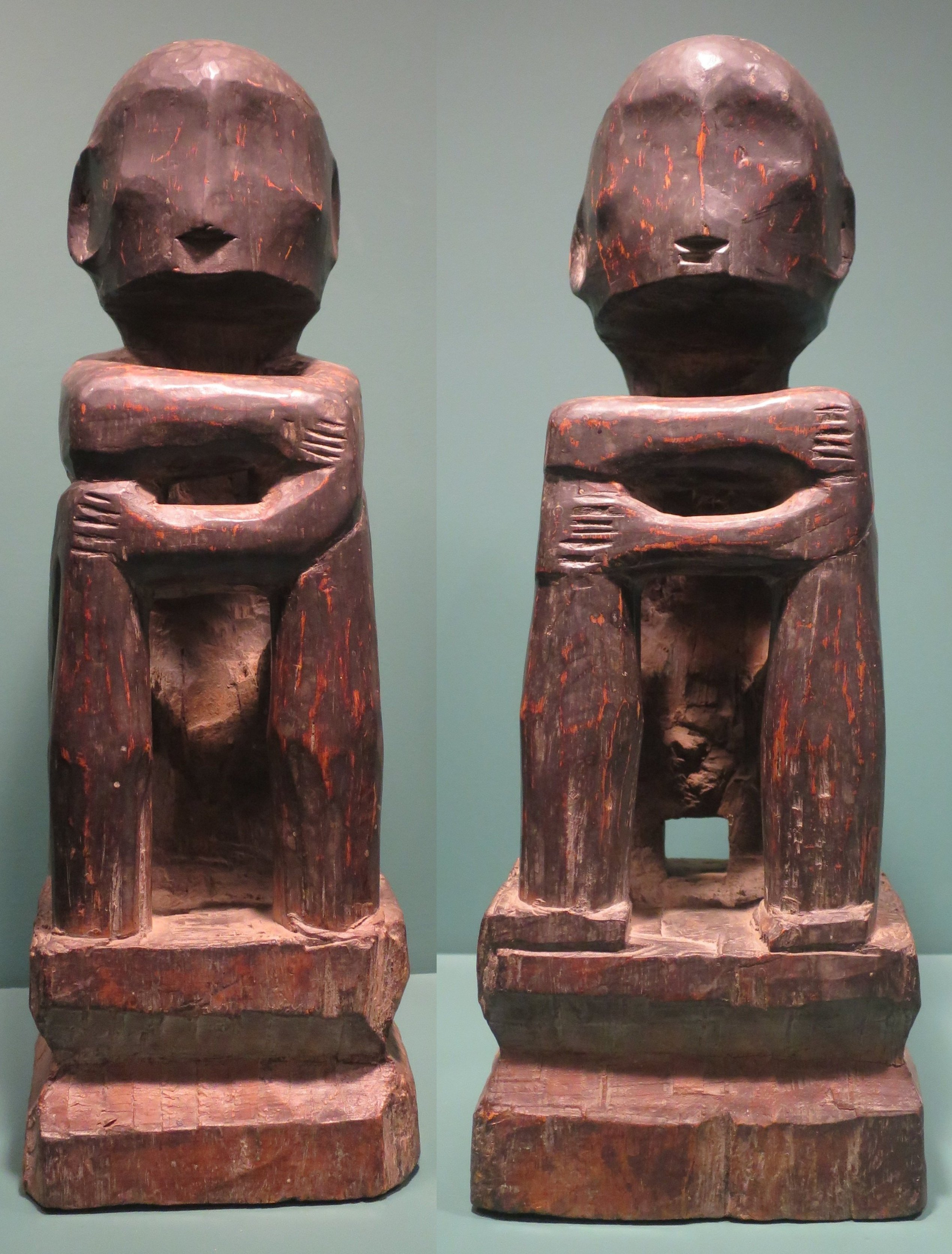
A seated Bulul, the anthropomorphical representations of rice divinities protecting the seeds and the harvest of Ifugao people

=== Spanish colonial era ===
The gold found in the land of the Igorot was an attraction for the Spanish. Originally gold was exchanged at Pangasinan by the Igorot. The gold was used to buy consumable products by the Igorot. Both gold and desire to Christianize the Igorot were given as reasons for Spanish conquest. In 1572 the Spanish started hunting for the gold. Benguet Province was entered by the Spanish with the intention of obtaining gold. The fact that the Igorots managed to stay out of Spanish dominion vexed the Spaniards. The gold evaded the hands of the Spaniards due to Igorot opposition. The Igorot would also be used as mercenaries and scouts during the Philippine Revolution and the Philippine-American War.

=== American colonial era ===
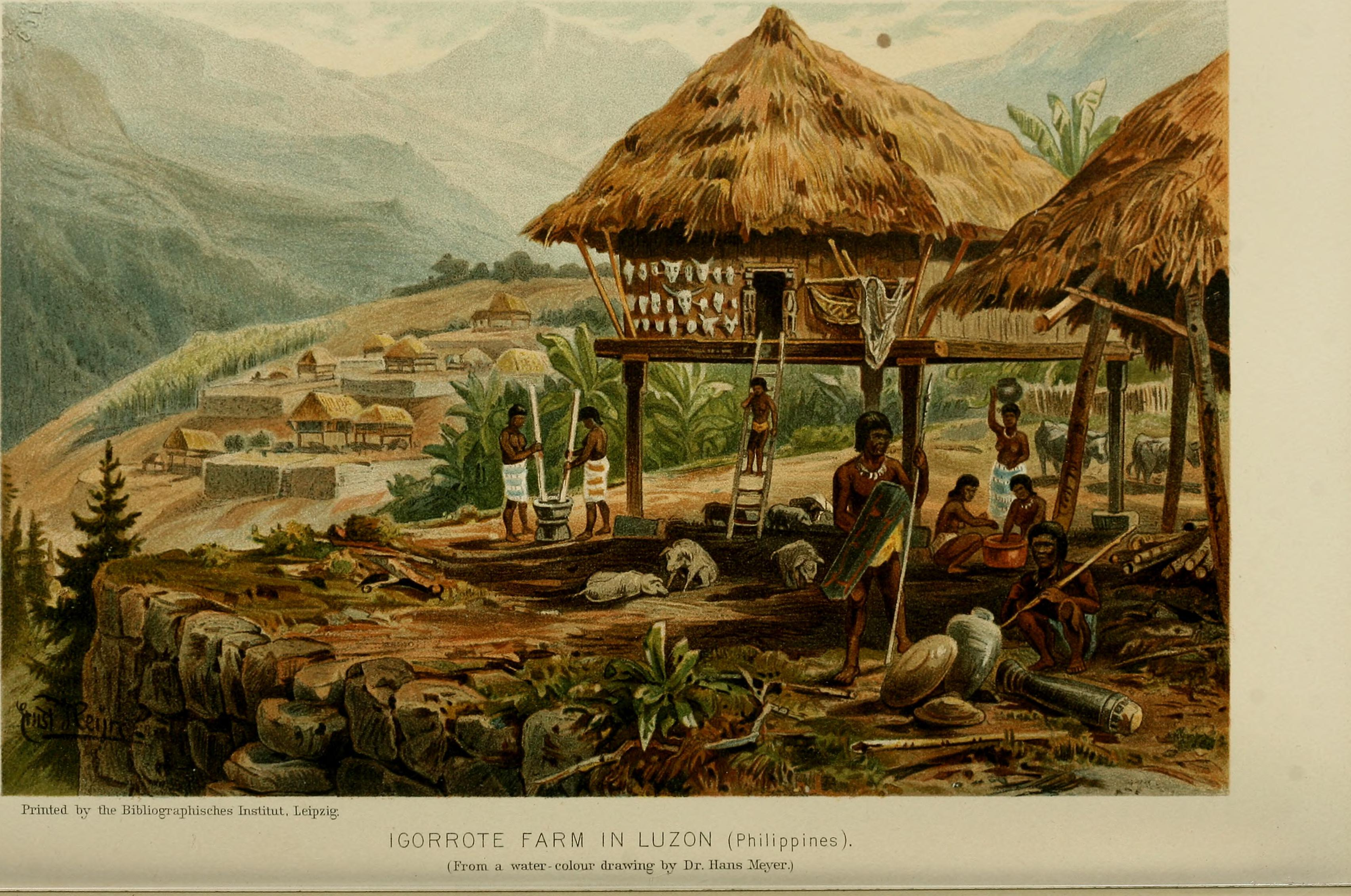
A watercolor depiction of an Igorot farm, c. 1896

Samuel E. Kane wrote about his life amongst the Bontoc, Ifugao, and Kalinga after the Philippine–American War in his book Thirty Years with the Philippine Head-Hunters (1933). The first American school for Igorot girls was opened in Baguio in 1901 by Alice McKay Kelly. Kane argued that Dean C. Worcester "did more than any one man to stop head-hunting and to bring the traditional enemy tribes together in friendship." Kane wrote of the Igorot people, "there is a peace, a rhythm and an elemental strength in the life...which all the comforts and refinements of civilization can not replace...fifty years hence...there will be little left to remind the young Igorots of the days when the drums and ganzas of the head-hunting canyaos resounded throughout the land.

In 1903, missionary bishop Charles Brent traveled through northern Luzon, in hopes of directing missionary efforts to convert the pagan Igorot populace. A mission church was established for the Bontoc tribe of the Igorots in the Bontoc, Mountain Province. The Bontoc missionaries wrote the first Igorot grammars, which were published by the government.

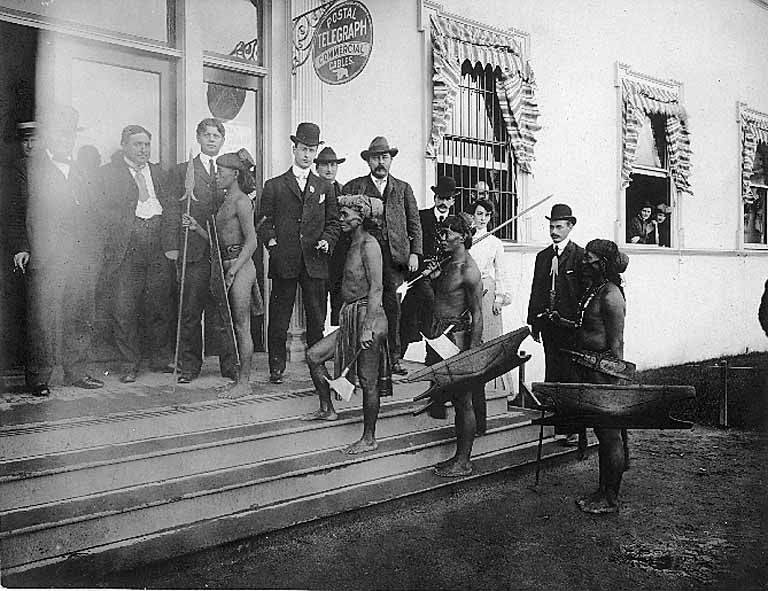
Igorot men with spears, axes and shields next to American spectators at the Lewis and Clark Exposition, in Portland, Oregon in 1905

In 1904, a group of Igorot people were brought to St. Louis, Missouri, United States, for the St. Louis World's Fair. They constructed the Igorot Village in the Philippine Exposition section of the fair, which became one of the most popular exhibits. The poet T. S. Eliot, who was born and raised in St. Louis, visited and explored the Village. Inspired by their tribal dance and others, he wrote the short story, "The Man Who Was King" (1905). In 1905, 50 tribespeople were on display at a Brooklyn, New York, amusement park for the summer, ending in the custody of the unscrupulous Truman Hunt, a showman "on the run across America with the tribe in tow."

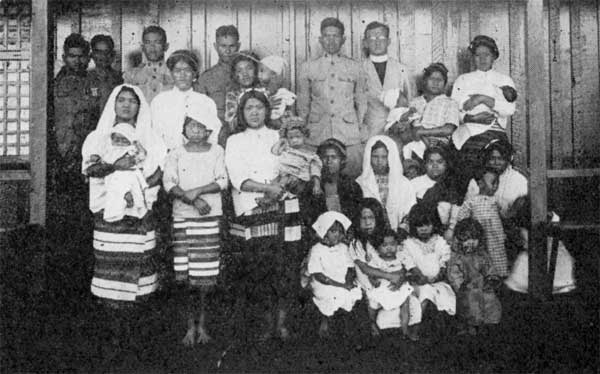
Igorot Constabulary members and their families, circa 1923.

On February 12, 1912, a Mountain Province Igorot chief named Gagaban became the first Filipino to fly in an airplane, riding as a passenger in a biplane called the "Red Devil" with Lee Hammond as the pilot.

=== World War II ===
During the Japanese occupation of the Philippines, Igorots fought against Japan. Donald Blackburn's World War II guerrilla force had a strong core of Igorots. A young Igorot woman, Naomi Flores, was an important member of the Miss U Spy Ring. General Tomoyuki Yamashita surrendered to Filipino and American forces in Kiangan, Ifugao in early September 1945; a shrine was built in the town commemorating his surrender.

=== Postwar era ===
On June 18, 1966, Republic Act No. 4695 was enacted to split Mountain Province and create four separate and independent provinces namely Benguet, Ifugao, Kalinga-Apayao, and Mountain Province. Ifugao and Kalinga-Apayao were placed under the jurisdiction of the Cagayan Valley region, with Benguet and Mountain Province placed under the Ilocos Region.

==== Martial law ====
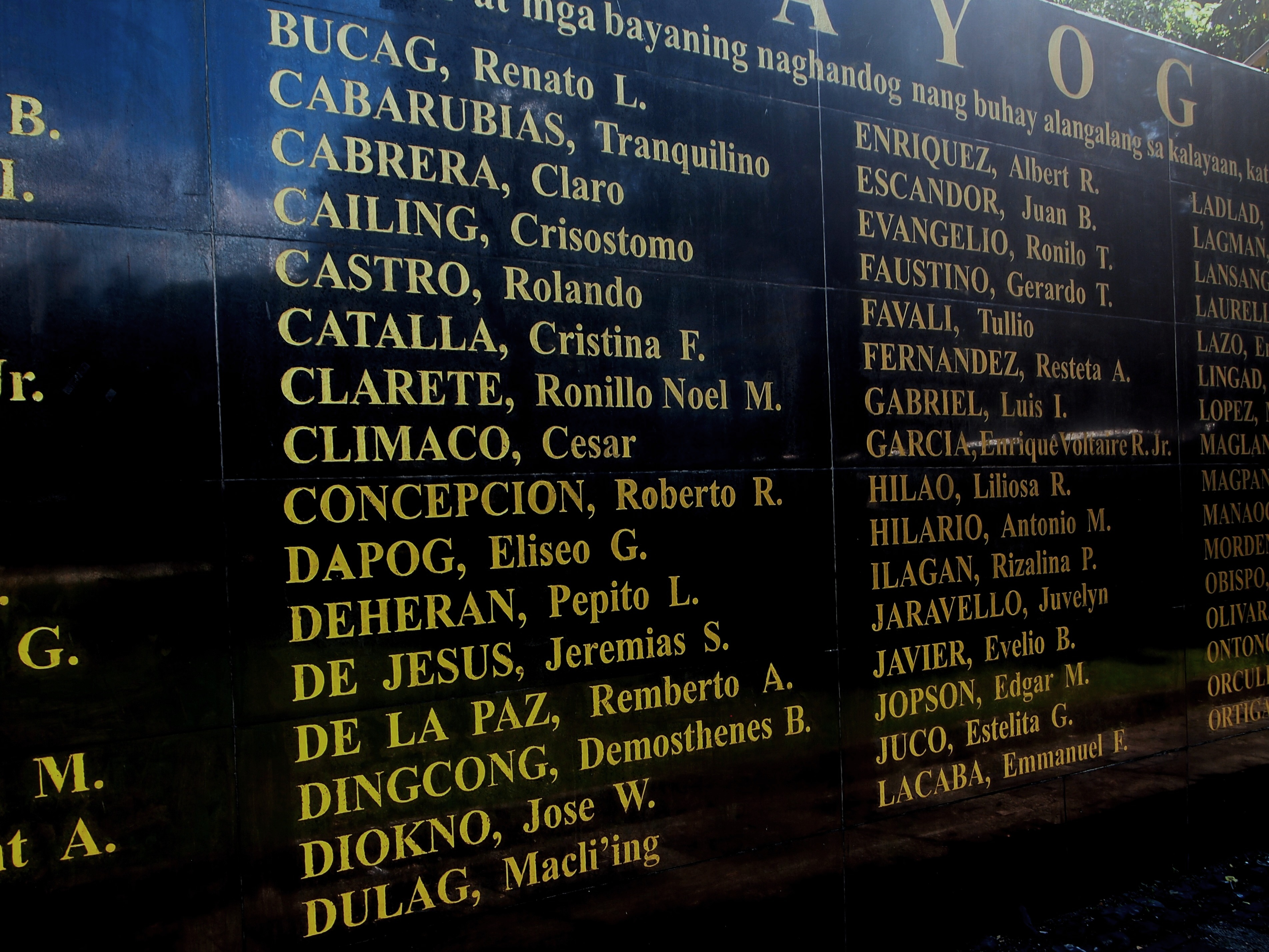
Detail of the Wall of Remembrance at the Bantayog ng mga Bayani in Quezon City, showing names from the first batch of Bantayog Honorees, including that of Macli-ing Dulag.

After the declaration of martial law by Ferdinand Marcos in 1972, the region became the focus of militarization as a result of local objections to the government's push for the Chico River Dam Project near Sadanga, Mountain Province, and Tinglayan, Kalinga. Frustrated by the project delays caused by the opposition, Ferdinand Marcos issued Presidential Decree no. 848 in December 1975, constituting the municipalities of Lubuagan, Tinglayan, Tanudan, and Pasil into a "Kalinga Special Development Region" (KSDR), in an effort to neutralize opposition to the Chico IV dam.

Empowered by martial law to conduct warrantless arrests, the 60th PC Brigade had arrested at least 150 locals by April 1977, accusing them of supposed subversion and of obstructing government projects, and various other offenses such as boycotting the October 1976 constitutional referendum. Individuals arrested included tribal papangat (leaders/elders), young couples, and in at least one case, a 12-year-old child. By December 1978, parts of the Chico IV area had been declared "free fire zones", no-man's-land areas where the army could freely fire on any animals or permit-less humans at will.

On April 24, 1980, Marcos-controlled military forces assassinated Macli-ing Dulag, a pangat (leader) of the Butbut tribe of Kalinga. The assassination became a watershed moment, marking the first time the mainstream Philippine press could be openly critical against Marcos and the military, and building up a sense of Igorot identity.

==== Mount Data Peace Accord ====
After the end of the Marcos administration due to the 1986 People Power Revolution, the succeeding government under President Corazon Aquino secured a ceasefire with the main indigenous armed group in the Cordilleras, the Cordillera People's Liberation Army (CPLA) led by Conrado Balweg. The Aquino government made a sipat or indigenous treaty, which would be known as the Mount Data Peace Accord, with the CPLA on September 13, 1986, ending hostilities.

== See also ==
- Ethnic groups in the Philippines
- Indigenous peoples of the Philippines
- Lumad
- Moro people
