= Administrative divisions of the Philippines =

The Philippines is divided into four levels of administrative divisions, with the lower three being defined in the Local Government Code of 1991 as local government units (LGUs). They are, from highest to lowest:

1. Regions (Filipino: rehiyon), which are primarily used to organize national services. Of the 18 regions, only one—the Bangsamoro Autonomous Region in Muslim Mindanao—has an elected government to which the national government has devolved powers.
2. Provinces (Filipino: lalawigan or probinsya), 82 in total, independent cities (Filipino: malayang lungsod or siyudad), 38 in total and one independent municipality (Pateros)
3. Component cities (Filipino: nakapaloob na lungsod or siyudad), 149 in total and municipalities (Filipino: bayan or munisipalidad), 1,493 in total
4. Barangays (formerly known as, and sometimes still referred to as, barrios) within a city or municipality, 42,010 in total

Other divisions also exist for specific purposes, such as:

- Geographic island groups;
- Local administrative districts used by some local governments;
- Judicial regions for regional trial courts;
- Legislative districts for the election of representatives at the national, regional, and local levels;
- A special geographic area for the administration of Bangsamoro territory in Cotabato; and
- Special-purpose districts established for various government agencies.

== Administrative divisions ==
Map of the Philippines showing the location of all the regions and provinces.

=== Regions ===
==== Administrative regions ====
Administrative regions are groupings of geographically adjacent LGUs that are established, disestablished, and modified by the president of the Philippines based on the need to more coherently make economic development policies and coordinate the provision of national government services within a larger area beyond the province level. No plebiscites have been conducted so far to democratically confirm the creation, abolition, or alteration of the boundaries of regular administrative regions, as the Constitution does not mandate it.

An administrative region is not a local government unit (LGU), but rather a group of LGUs to which the president has provided an unelected policy-making and coordinating structure, called the Regional Development Council (RDC). Metro Manila, formally the National Capital Region, is recognized by law as a "special development and administrative region", and was thus given a metropolitan authority; the Metro Manila Council within the MMDA serves as the region's RDC.

Administrative regions are composed of provinces and/or independent cities, or, in the case of Pateros, an independent municipality, or, in the case of Isabela City, a component city. The Philippine Statistics Authority further divides the LGUs of Metro Manila into four numbered geographic districts for statistical purposes.

==== Autonomous regions ====
The 1987 Constitution allows for the creation of autonomous regions in the Cordillera Central of Luzon and in the Muslim-majority areas of Mindanao. However, only the Bangsamoro Autonomous Region in Muslim Mindanao and its predecessor, the Autonomous Region in Muslim Mindanao, have been approved by voters in plebiscites held in 1989, 2001, and 2019. Voters in the Cordilleras rejected autonomy in 1990 and 1998; hence, the Cordillera Administrative Region remains a regular administrative region with no delegated powers or responsibilities.

The sole autonomous region at present, the Bangsamoro Autonomous Region in Muslim Mindanao, comprises local government units that have consented by plebiscite to be placed under the authority of the Bangsamoro regional government. An autonomous region, while possessing a government, is not a local government unit (LGU) per se, as the autonomous regional government's organization and structure are not defined by the Local Government Code of 1991, unlike provinces, cities, municipalities, and barangays. Rather, an autonomous region is a group of LGUs to which Congress has provided via statute a very specific form of regional governance structure, along with certain powers and responsibilities.

Local government hierarchy

President of the Philippines
Autonomous regions
Provinces	Independent cities	Provinces	Independent cities
Component cities	Municipalities	Component cities	Municipalities
Barangays	Barangays	Barangays	Barangays	Barangays	Barangays

The dashed lines emanating from the president means that the President only exercises general supervision on local government.

=== Local government units ===
In the Local Government Code of 1991, a local government unit (LGU) can take the form of a province, a city, a municipality, or a barangay. All LGUs have local legislatures (Sanggunian) and local chief executives (governor, mayor, or barangay captain) that are elected by popular vote.

Per the Local Government Code of 1991, section 25, the President of the Philippines exercises direct supervisory authority over provinces and independent cities (i.e., highly urbanized and independent component cities); thus, LGUs that belong to these categories form the primary level of LGUs in the Philippines. Pateros, by virtue of not belonging to any province, effectively also constitutes a primary level LGU.

==== Provinces ====
A province is composed of component cities and municipalities, over which it exercises supervisory authority. Each province is headed by a governor. Its legislative body is the Sangguniang Panlalawigan.

==== Cities and municipalities ====
Three different legal classes of cities exist in the Philippines. Independent cities, of which there are currently 38 – classified either as highly urbanized (33) or independent component (5) cities – are cities which are not under the jurisdiction of any province. Thus, these cities are autonomously governed, do not share their tax revenues with any province, and in most cases, their residents are not eligible to elect or be elected to provincial offices. Cities that are under the political jurisdiction of a province form the third legal class of cities, called component cities. The voters in these cities are allowed to vote and run for positions in the provincial government.

Municipalities are always under the jurisdiction of a province, except for Pateros, which is self-governing.

A city or municipality is divided into barangays, over which it exercises supervisory authority. A city or municipality is headed by a mayor. The Sangguniang Panlungsod is the legislative body for cities and Sangguniang Bayan for municipalities.

==== Barangays ====
The barangay is the smallest local government unit in the Philippines. Although "barangay" is sometimes translated into English as "village", a barangay can be:

- an urban neighborhood, such as a city block or a gated community (e.g., Forbes Park, Makati);
- a sizable urban district (e.g., Payatas, Quezon City);
- a single hamlet or village (e.g., Pag-asa, Kalayaan, Palawan);
- a small town (e.g., Mangagoy, Bislig, Surigao del Sur); or
- a rural district composed of disperse settlements (e.g., Nagacadan, Kiangan, Ifugao).

Each barangay is headed by a Barangay Captain. Its local legislative body is the Sangguniang Barangay.

== Other divisions ==
=== Island groups ===
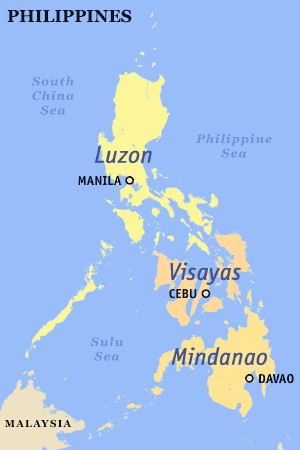
Map showing the traditional island groups of Luzon, the Visayas, and Mindanao, with the largest city in each respective area.

The Philippines is broadly divided into three traditional island groups: Luzon, the Visayas, and Mindanao. The Philippine flag's three stars are often taken to represent each of these geographical groupings. These island groups, however, have no specific administrative bodies, either elected or appointed, although many agencies and institutions, both government and private, use island groupings for certain purposes. For example, the Palarong Pambansa rotates yearly hosting duties among the island groups, while the League of Municipalities of the Philippines organizes its members and meetings by Luzon, Visayas and Mindanao "clusters."

=== Local administrative districts ===
Some LGUs use geographic divisions that are solely used for administrative purposes.

==== Geographic districts and zones ====
Certain cities officially organize their constituent barangays into geographic districts:

- Baguio: 20 (Districts 1–20)
- Butuan: 13
- Calbayog: 3 (Calbayog, Oquendo, Tinambacan)
- Davao City: 11 (Agdao, Baguio, Buhangin, Bunawan, Calinan, Marilog, Paquibato, Poblacion, Talomo, Toril, Tugbok)
- Iloilo City: 7 (Arevalo, City Proper, Jaro, La Paz, Lapuz, Mandurriao, Molo)
- Malaybalay: 5 (Basakan, North Highway, Poblacion, South Highway, Upper Pulangi)
- Manila: 16 (Binondo, Ermita, Intramuros, Malate, Paco, Pandacan, Port Area, Quiapo, Sampaloc, San Andres, San Miguel, San Nicolas, Santa Ana, Santa Cruz, Santa Mesa, Tondo)
- Samal: 3 (Babak, Kaputian, Peñaplata)
- Sorsogon City: 2 (Bacon, Sorsogon)
- Zamboanga City: 13 (Ayala, Baliwasan, Curuan, Islands, Labuan, Manicahan, Mercedes, Putik, Santa Barbara, Santa Maria, Tetuan, Vitali, Zamboanga Central)

Three cities also officially organize their barangays into numbered zones: Caloocan (Zones 1–16), Manila (Zones 1–100), and Pasay (Zones 1–20). The 100 zones in Manila serve as an administrative layer immediately below the geographic district level.

Many barangay names contain the words "district" (170 barangays) or "zone" (264 barangays), but they are fully functioning barangays and are not just mere administrative categories.

==== Sitios and puroks ====
Many barangays are divided into sitios and puroks. Sitios are usually hamlets within rural barangays where human settlement is polycentric, i.e., multiple communities spread across a wide area, separated by farmland, mountains, or water. Puroks are often neighborhoods or zones in densely populated areas of barangays of more urban character. Purok and sitio boundaries are rarely defined precisely and may use natural landmarks such as roads, rivers or other natural features to unofficially delineate divisions. A single sitio or purok, or groups of these, form the basis of creating a new barangay.

Sitios and puroks are not local government units and therefore do not officially have an organized government subordinate to the barangay. However, there are sometimes unofficial arrangements that result in direct representation of purok or sitio interests in the barangay government. For example, a barangay council member may be officially designated as a purok leader, while sitio leaders may be appointed and drawn from the hamlet's residents.

=== Judicial regions ===
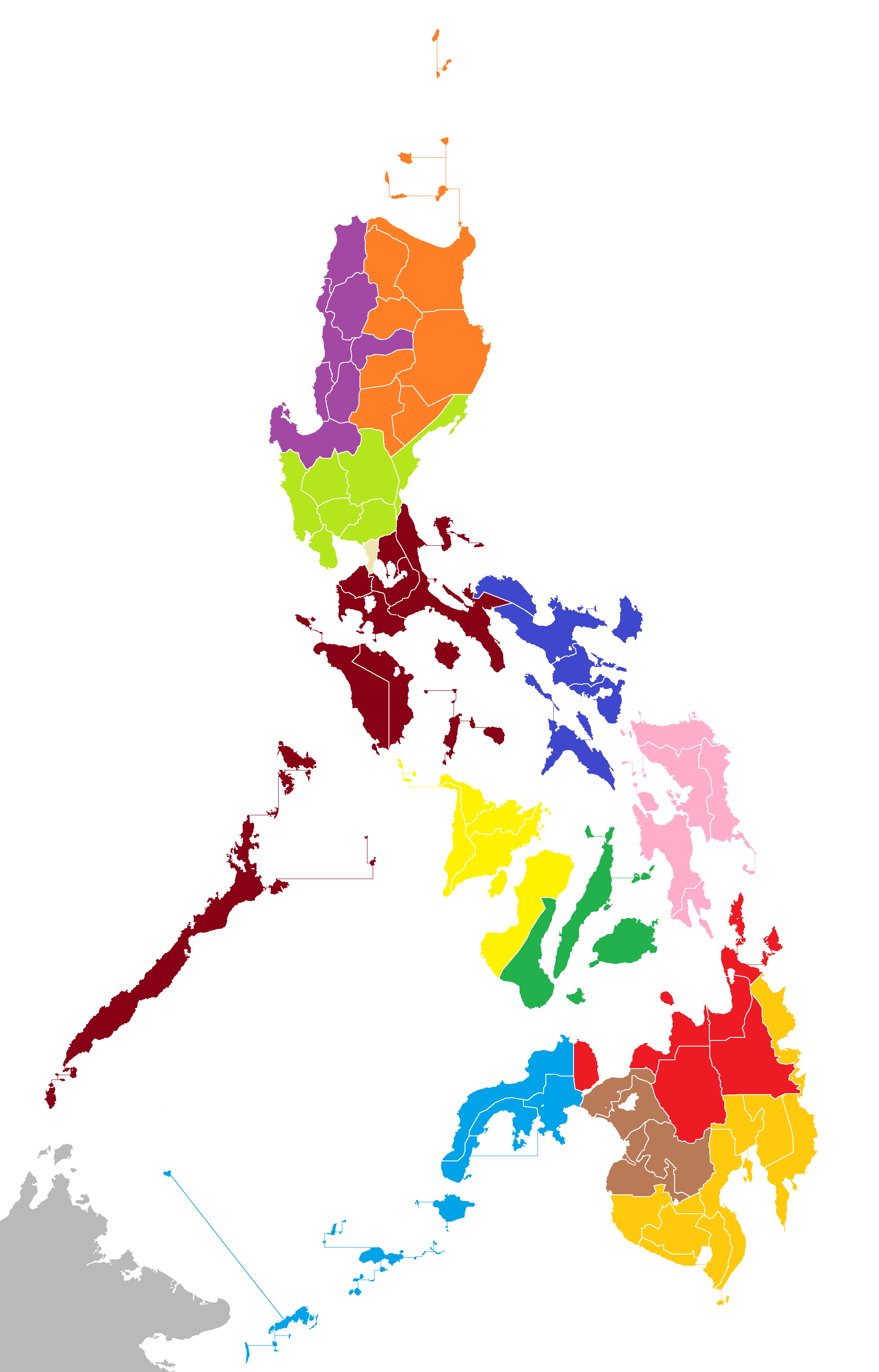
Map of the 13 judicial regions of the Philippines.

The Philippines is divided into thirteen judicial regions, to organize the judiciary. The judicial regions still reflect the original regional configuration introduced by President Ferdinand Marcos during his rule, except for the transfer of Aurora to the third judicial region from the fourth. These judicial regions are used for the appointment of judges of the different Regional Trial Courts.

=== Legislative districts ===
To elect legislators at national, regional, and local levels, the Philippines is divided into legislative districts.

==== National ====
Eighteenth Congress representation map of the Philippines

The electoral constituencies for the election of territory-based members of the House of Representatives of the Philippines are more precisely representative or congressional districts. Each province is guaranteed at least one seat, and more populous provinces are also provided more. Many cities that have a population of at least 250,000 inhabitants are also granted one or more seats.

If a province or a city is composed of only one legislative district, it is said to be the lone district (e.g., the "Lone District of Guimaras"). Multiple districts within more populous cities and provinces are given numerical designations (e.g., the "2nd District of Cagayan").

==== Regional ====
The electoral constituencies for the election of members of the Bangsamoro Parliament will be called parliamentary districts, the Bangsamoro Transition Authority will decide the parliamentary districts for the first parliamentary elections, with the succeeding elections' districts being decided by the parliament.

The Bangsamoro Autonomous Region's predecessor, the Autonomous Region in Muslim Mindanao (1990–2019), had a Regional Legislative Assembly (RLA) which elected three members from each of its eight assembly districts. These assembly districts were coterminous with the existing congressional districts of the time, except that the assembly districts excluded territories that are not under the jurisdiction of the ARMM (i.e., Isabela City excluded from the assembly district of Basilan; Cotabato City excluded from the first assembly district of Maguindanao). Before voting for inclusion into the ARMM in 2001, Marawi City was also excluded from the first assembly district of Lanao del Sur.

==== Local ====
The electoral constituencies for the election of territory-based members of the Sangguniang Panlalawigan of all 81 provinces, the Sangguniang Panlungsod of 26 cities and the Sangguniang Bayan of Pateros, are more precisely sanggunian districts.

- Sangguniang Panlalawigan districts: COMELEC divides provinces that comprise a lone congressional district into two SP districts. In provinces that are already divided into more than one congressional district, SP districts mostly follow the same boundaries, with the main exceptions being the exclusion of independent cities. SP districts in Bulacan and Laguna also include the cities of San Jose del Monte (Bulacan), and Biñan, Calamba and Santa Rosa (Laguna) in their former congressional districts. Sangguniang Panlalawigan districts are sometimes called provincial board districts.
- Sangguniang Panlungsod districts: The election of regular SP members in 26 cities is through territory-based districts that encompass only portions of each city. The SP district boundaries in 10 cities are coterminous with congressional district boundaries; the SP districts in Taguig also mostly follow the congressional district boundaries, except that Pateros is factored out. Two cities (Manila and Quezon City) are divided into six SP districts; four (Caloocan, Davao City, Samal and Sorsogon City) into three SP districts; and the remaining 20 into two SP districts. Sangguniang Panlungsod districts are sometimes called councilor districts.
- Sangguniang Bayan districts: Only the Metro Manila municipality of Pateros is divided into two SB districts for electing regular members to the Sangguniang Bayan. The Sangguniang Bayan districts of Pateros are sometimes called councilor districts.

=== Special-purpose districts ===
The various executive departments has also divided the country into their respective districts. The Department of Public Works and Highways, Department of Education, and the Bureau of Internal Revenue, for example, divide the country into "engineering," "school," and "revenue" districts, respectively.

== Summary ==
The following table summarizes the number and structure of regions, provinces, cities, municipalities, and barangays in the Philippines as of July 08,2025.

#	Type	Chief executive	Legislative body	Number
–	Autonomous regions	Chief minister (Note: There is also a ceremonial head of Bangsamoro, called the Wa'lī.)	Bangsamoro Parliament	1
–	Administrative regions			17
1	Provinces	Governor	Sangguniang Panlalawigan; Provincial Board	82
2	Cities and municipalities	Mayor	Sangguniang Panlungsod; City Council	149
2	Cities and municipalities	Mayor	Sangguniang Bayan; Municipal Council	1,493
3	Barangays	Barangay captain	Sangguniang Barangay; Barangay Council	42,010

== See also ==
- Local government in the Philippines
- Federalism in the Philippines
