= Sorsogon Cultural Center =

Future theater in Sorsogon, Philippines

- Sorsogon Cultural Center for the Arts
- Location in Sorsogon Location in Luzon Location in the Philippines
- Address: Barangay Cabid-an, City Hall Compound; Sorsogon City; Philippines
- Coordinates: 12°58′52″N 124°01′23″E
- Capacity: 515
- Type: Theater

Construction
- Groundbreaking: October 16, 2017

Sorsogon Cultural Center for the Arts, also known as just the Sorsogon Cultural Center, is a theater underconstruction in Sorsogon City, Philippines. It is regarded as the second national cultural center of the Philippines, with the first being the Cultural Center of the Philippines Complex in Manila.

Construction of the venue began on October 16, 2017. The facility has a total seating capacity is 515; 338 seats on ground floor and 177 seats on the mid-floor level.
