= Sorsogon Sports Arena =

Athletics stadium in Sorsogon City

- Interactive map of Sorsogon Sports Arena
- Address: Sorsogon City; Philippines
- Coordinates: 12.9787°N 124.0140°E
- Capacity: 12,000
- Surface: Grass

Construction
- Opened: October 17, 2024
- Architects: Mohri & P.A. Associates

The Sorsogon Sports Arena is an athletics stadium in Sorsogon City, Philippines.

== History ==
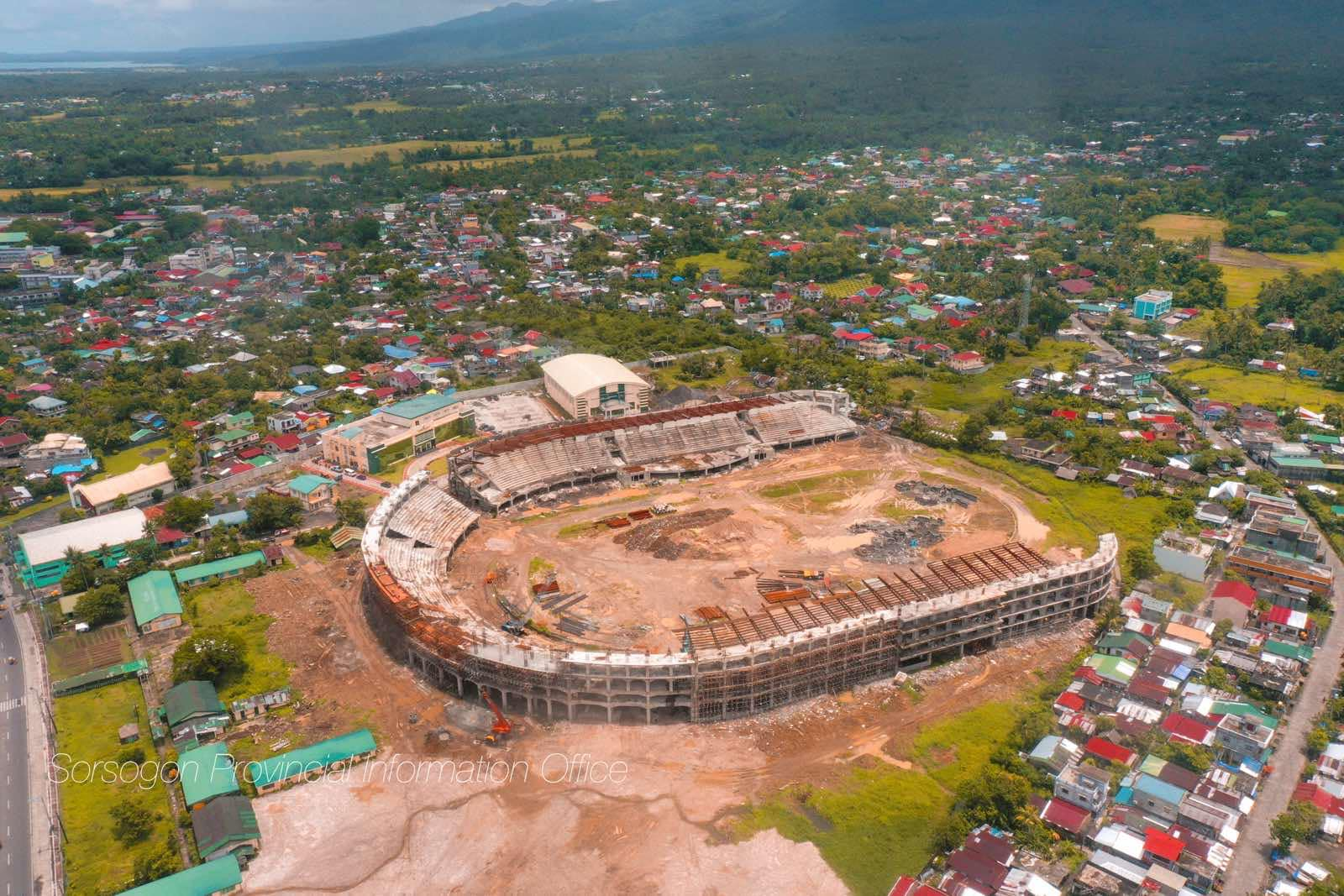
The venue's structure under construction. May 2021.

The Sorsogon Sports Coliseum was built on the former site of the Balogo Sports Complex (renamed Sorsogon Sports Complex). The sports venue was originally built for Sorsogon province's hosting of the Palarong Pambansa in 2022 which was later postponed to 2023.

With a seating capacity of 12,000, the sports venue is patterned after the Colosseum of Rome.

Under President Duterte's administration was instrumental in allocating funds for the redevelopment, which cost around P887 million. This was part of his administration's efforts to boost sports facilities nationwide and promote regional development.

The arena was inaugurated in October 17, 2024 under President Marcos Jr.'s administration. The inauguration was coincided with the province’s 50th founding anniversary.
