= List of barangays in Sorsogon City =

Sorsogon City is politically subdivided into 64 barangays – a combination of barangays from both former towns of Sorsogon and Bacon, now both considered as districts of the city. Each barangay consists of puroks, and some have sitios, and it's on Sorsogon West

== East District ==
=== Abuyog ===
It is the last barangay in the southern part of the city. It is connected to both Brgy. Boton, Casiguran and Brgy. Payawin, Gubat. Several commercial fishponds can be found in this barangay due to some tributaries of Sorsogon Bay.

=== Almendras-Cogon (Pob.) ===
This barangay borders Barangays Sampaloc, Balogo, Burabod and Bibincahan. The said barangay hosts to several major schools in the city – Lewis College (formerly Annunciation College), Sorsogon National High School and Sorsogon State University. Magsaysay Street traverses this barangay.

=== Balogo ===
It is one of the developed barangays. It borders Barangays Almendras, Buhatan, Bibincahan and Cabid-an. It houses several government institutions like Balogo Elementary School, DepEd – Sorsogon City, and Balogo Sports Complex. SM City Sorsogon is located in this barangay, and so is the exit of Sorsogon Coastal Road.

Part of Balogo, especially the eastern part bordering Cabid-an, is a former army reservation during the American occupation, according to the old folks.

The city's largest church of Iglesia ni Kristo and The Church of Jesus Christ of Latter-day Saints are located in the said barangay. The only remaining track oval in Sorsogon (until the early 90s Sorsogon National High School had a 400-m athletic track), Balogo Sports Complex, can be found in this barangay, just beside Balogo Elementary School. It hosted Bicol Meet events in the past..

=== Bibincahan ===
Is the largest barangay in the city. It borders Barangays Cabid-an and Balogo on the east, San Juan on the west, Salog on the south. North of it is unclassified forest land, which offers a good hiking experience. Major city roads, like the Sorsogon diversion road from Brgys. Pangpang to Cabid-an, or the Sorsogon-Bacon road that connects the 2 districts, and Barangay Road that connects it with Balogo, pass by this barangay. The Sorsogon Cock Pit is also located in this barangay, along Barangay Road. A smaller Iglesia ni Kristo church can be found here on the corner of the Sorsogon Diversion and Bacon-Sorsogon Roads in Sitio Baribag. The Sorsogon Memorial Park is also located here – it is the first private memorial park in the city.

It hosts to one of the oldest subdivision in the city – Sts. Peter and Paul Ville Subdivision and Our Lady's Village – Bibincahan, both accessible via Magsaysay St.

=== Burabod (Pob.) ===
It is located at the heart of the city where the first central school is located, Sorsogon East Central School.

=== Polvorista (Pob.) ===
It is believed that its name came from the Spanish word, polvora, or gunpowder used for the production of fireworks or kwitis. It is said that to be a place were residents are experts in production of kwitis, which, in the 19th century, became a necessity for the celebration of fiestas, festivals and general merrymaking. Before this, just like in other parts of Bikol Region, kwitis, were used to warn people of an impending Moro raid.

=== Sampaloc (Pob.)(Feast Day – October 24) ===
It's a coastal barangay, bounded by Brgy. Balogo in the Northeast, Sorsogon Bay in the East, Brgy. Talisay in the Southwest, Brgy. Polvorista in the West and Brgy. Almendras-Cogon in the Northwest. The Catholic cemetery is located in the said barangay, along Almendras Street. The PNP Provincial Office, Camp Salvador Escudero Sr. is located on the said barangay, along Magsaysay Street.

It has an area of 12.58 hectares, which has a flat topography.

=== San Juan-Roro ===
==== Sirangan (Pob.) ====
This is a coastal barangay along Sorsogon Bay. One of the major rivers, Salog River cuts across this barangay. It also hosts several commercial establishments due to its proximity to the city center. Sts. Peter and Paul Cathedral, the old Pantranco bus station and Plaza Bonifacio are located in this barangay.

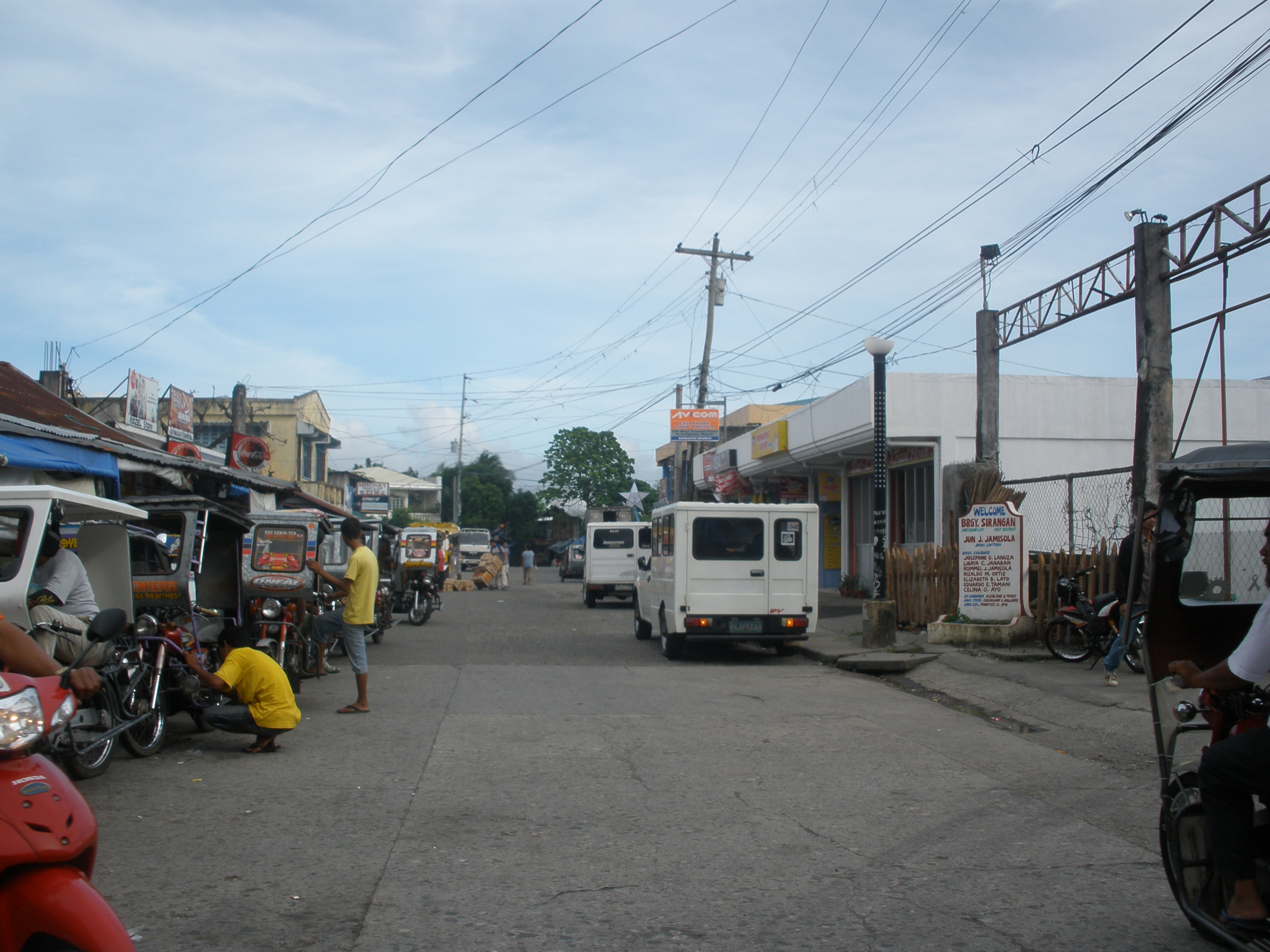
This is the extension of Rizal Street, towards the bay, located at Brgy. Sirangan. The large gate on the right is originally the entrance to the former Pantranco (later on Philtranco) bus depot; its former station was also located in Brgy. Sirangan.

== West District ==
=== Barayong ===
(Feast Day: May 16) – It is surrounded by Brgy. Guinlajon in the north, Brgy. Basud in the northwest, Brgy. Gimaloto in the southwest and Brgy. Pamurayan on the southeast. Its topography is plain. Brgy Barayong's name come from the Tree name BAYAYONG a huge and tall tree know of its strength dominantly scattered in the place. Almost 65% of the population are farmers considering 70% of the land is agricultural. Rice, coconut, rootcrops and vegetables are its major agricultural products.

- Basud (Feast Day: October 24) – barangay Basud borders Brgy. Guinlajon on the south and Ticol on the north. It hosts to a rice mill along the Maharlika Highway, right after passing through the Cawayan Bridge going north. On the south side of Pan-Philippine Highway is a wide vast of rice fields extending to several barangays – Gimaloto and Capuy. On the north side is a mountainous area.

Its major source of income is agriculture (50%), fisheries (1%), business (25%) and others.

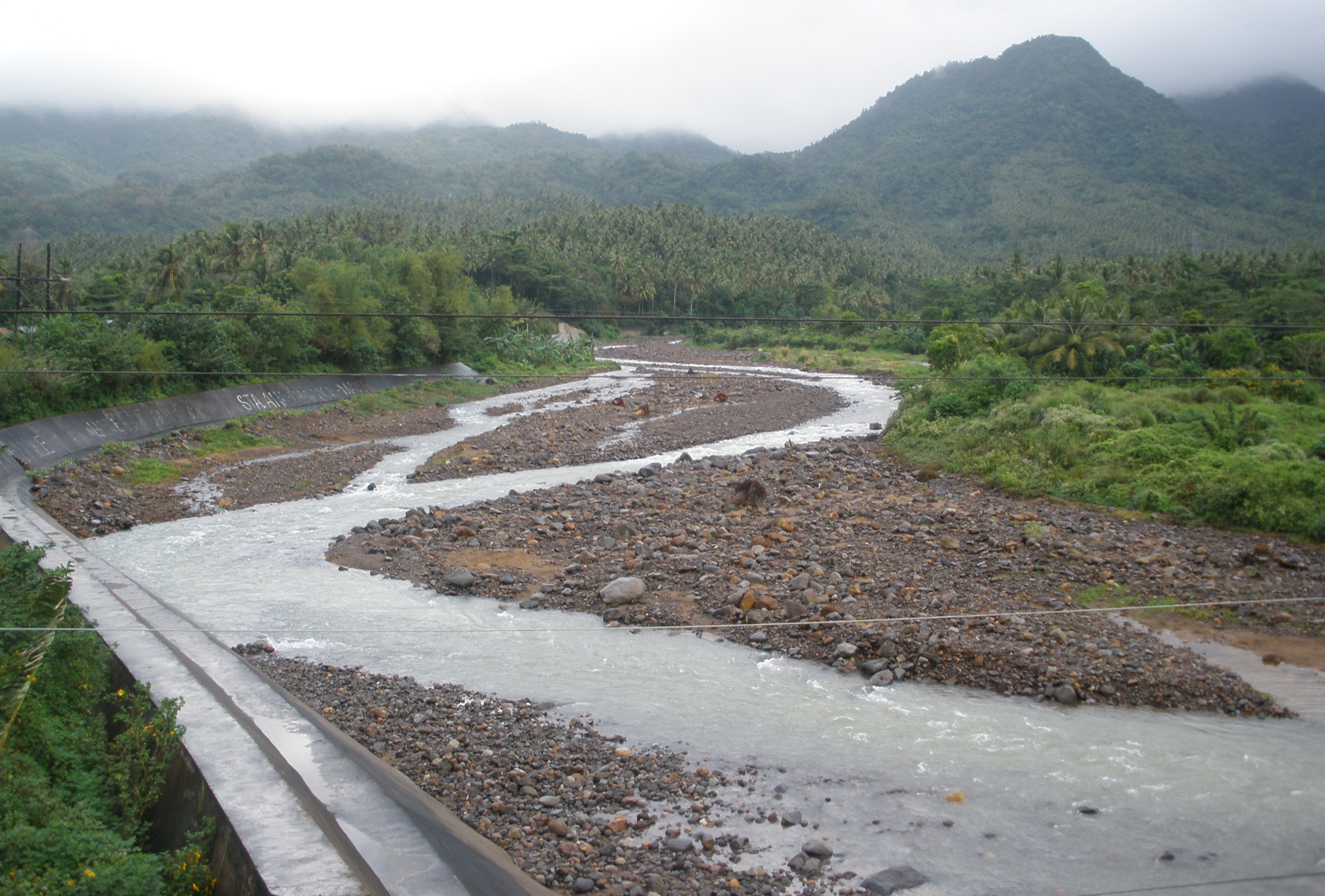
This is the eastern side of Cawayan Bridge, overlooking Cawayan River.

- Bitan-o/Dalipay (Pob.)
- Bucalbucalan – It hosts the Pepita Park and Rest Area and later the awarded 100 years old Acacia tree located.
- Buenavista
- Bulabog – it is located between barangays Bucalbucalan and Capuy, along the Maharlika Highway. Mostly a small wet market for seafood products.

It is a destination for those who want to buy the fresh catch in the morning, especially sea shell products.

It has also dwindling mangrove along its coast.

- Cambulaga
- Capuy – it is located between barangays Bulabog on the north and Ticol on the south. It is relatively flat land with rice field and a hilly part on the eastern side.

It has a single elementary school on the Barangay center.

Aside from rice and coconut products, it also produces calamondin from one of the couple of orchards (the other one is Tabuena's located in brgy. Guinlajon) in the city.

- Gimaloto
- Guinlajon – it hosts the only hydroelectric power plant in the city. It is a popular destination for hikers since it has trails that lead to Bacman Geothermal Plant, to Bacon district or to Manito, Albay. It hosts to the former Sorsogon National High School Annex, now known as Tabuena National High School. Formerly he entrance to the Cawayan River for trucks quarrying sand (though nowadays, it is prohibited).

The new SSS building is also located in this area. Finally, barangay road to barangays Pamurayan, and Gimaloto can be found on this barangay.

- Macabog
- Pamurayan
- Pangpang – hosts to Our Lady's Village – Pangpang, and Sorsogon Medical Mission Doctors. Pangpang has Guinlajon on the west, Penafrancia on the south, Macabog on the east and Tugos on the southeast. North of Pangpang is unclassified forest land. It also hosts to a lone gasoline station, Shell, just beside the Pangpang Elementary School along the Maharlika Highway. The western entry point for the Sorsogon Diversion Road is in this barangay.
- Panlayaan
- Peñafrancia
- Piot (Pob.)
- Rizal
- Salog (Pob.)
- Salvacion – connects the town of Castilla and Sorsogon City. On its east, it shares a common border with Barangay Panlayaan.
- San Isidro
- San Juan (Roro)
- Talisay (Pob.) – is a coastal barangay located in Poblacion. It hosts to major schools like Sorsogon Pilot Elementary School and Saint Louise de Marillac College of Sorsogon. The Barangay Chairman for Talisay is Dennis Valladolid as of December, 2010.
- Ticol – is sandwiched between barangays Basud and Capuy. Wide areas of rice fields can be found in this barangay.
- Tugos

== Bacon District ==
In Bacon district, there are 28 barangays, namely:

- Balete (Feast Day: June 21) – It is bounded by Brgy. Rawis on the North, Brgy. Poblacion on the Northeast, Brgy. San Pascual in the Southeast, Brgy. San Roque in the South, Brgy. Maricrum on the Southwest, and Brgy. Cabarbuhan in the West. Its topography type is plains. Its name came from the Balete tree that's common in the barangay.
- Balogo (Feast Day: May 3–4) – Its land area is 1,800 hectares (out of this, 4 hec. is residential) with a plain topography. Its patron saint is Nuestra Señora De Antipolo. Its main produce is coconut (25%), fishing (55%), Palay (10%) and Pili (10%).

It is bounded by Brgy. Sawanga on the East, and Brgy. Bon-ot on the West side. It is accessible via the Bacon-Prieto Diaz Road.

- Bato (Feast Day: May 5) – It is bounded by Albay Gulf in the Northwest, Brgy. Gatbo in the Northeast, by Gubat, Sorsogon on the East and South, and by Brgy. Sugod on the Southwest. Its topography is composed of mountains and plains.

The old barangay was originally located along the banks of Sugod. It was called Rizal or Sabang. But because of common storm surge, they moved it inland what is now called Bato, wherein limestones are common to be found. Bato is the Tagalog of stone.

- Bon-Ot – It is a coastal town, which hosts to the Pagol Beach. It is accessible via the Bacon-Prieto Diaz Road.
- Bogña
- Buenavista
- Cabarbuhan
- Caricaran – a coastal barangay where the popular Tolonggapo Beach is located. It borders 3 barangays, namely, Poblacion on its west, Bonga on its east, and San Pascual on its south. It is also where the old Bacon town hall is located (where the staircase can be seen protruding from the beach sand).
- Del Rosario
- Gatbo
- Jamislagan (Feast Day: May 11) – one of the landlocked, mountainous barangays of the city's Bacon district. Its main produce is Copra/Coconut (93%), handicraft (5%) and Palay (3%). It has 5 sitios, namely, Batang, Centro, Extension, Gutak, Palanas, Palali, and Tondo. It can be accessed via the San Vicente-Buhatan Road or along the Bacon-Prieto Diaz Road.
- Maricrum
- Osiao (Feast Day: August 1) – this is one of the far-flung barangays of Bacon district and the most practical transportation to reach it is by motorized banca. It has a mountainous area of 1,147 hectares. Copra/Coconut is the main product consisting of 70% of the barangay's main produce while the remaining is Palay. It has six sitios, namely, Bo. Site, Cabang An, Centro Bacolod, Gajo, Iraya 1&2, and Tiris.

Its original name was San Pedro, after a sailor named Pedro Desquitado who arrived in the small village and became its first ruler. In 1911, Eustaquio Dooc, the first Tiniente del Barrio, changed it to its current name in honor of Jose Jao. He was a wealthy businessman who stayed in the barangay permanently and said to be instrumental in the development of the place.

It hosts to one of the potential tourism spot – Danao Lake – situated on a mountain side. Due to its remoteness, it is a well known hiding place of New People's Army during the height of the communist rebellion on the ’80s.

- Poblacion – this is the former town center of Bacon. It hosts one of the oldest churches in Sorsogon located in a hilltop. A lone hospital is located in this barangay.
- Rawis
- Salvacion
- San Isidro – this is situated between San Ramon and San Roque (both barangays of the Bacon district). Radial access to this barangay is via a city road from Sitio Batuhan in Barangay San Roque. The road that cuts across this barangay proceeds via San Ramon and San Vicente, eventually merging with the Maharlika Highway in Barangay Buhatan (part of the Sorsogon district). San Isidro is relatively flat and its agriculture is mostly rice field. Part of the Bacon Airport’s runway (southern tip) is located in this barangay, while most of the portion is located in Barangay San Roque. According to the old folks, San Isidro was a major supplier of Banig and native hats made of Karagumoy leaves.

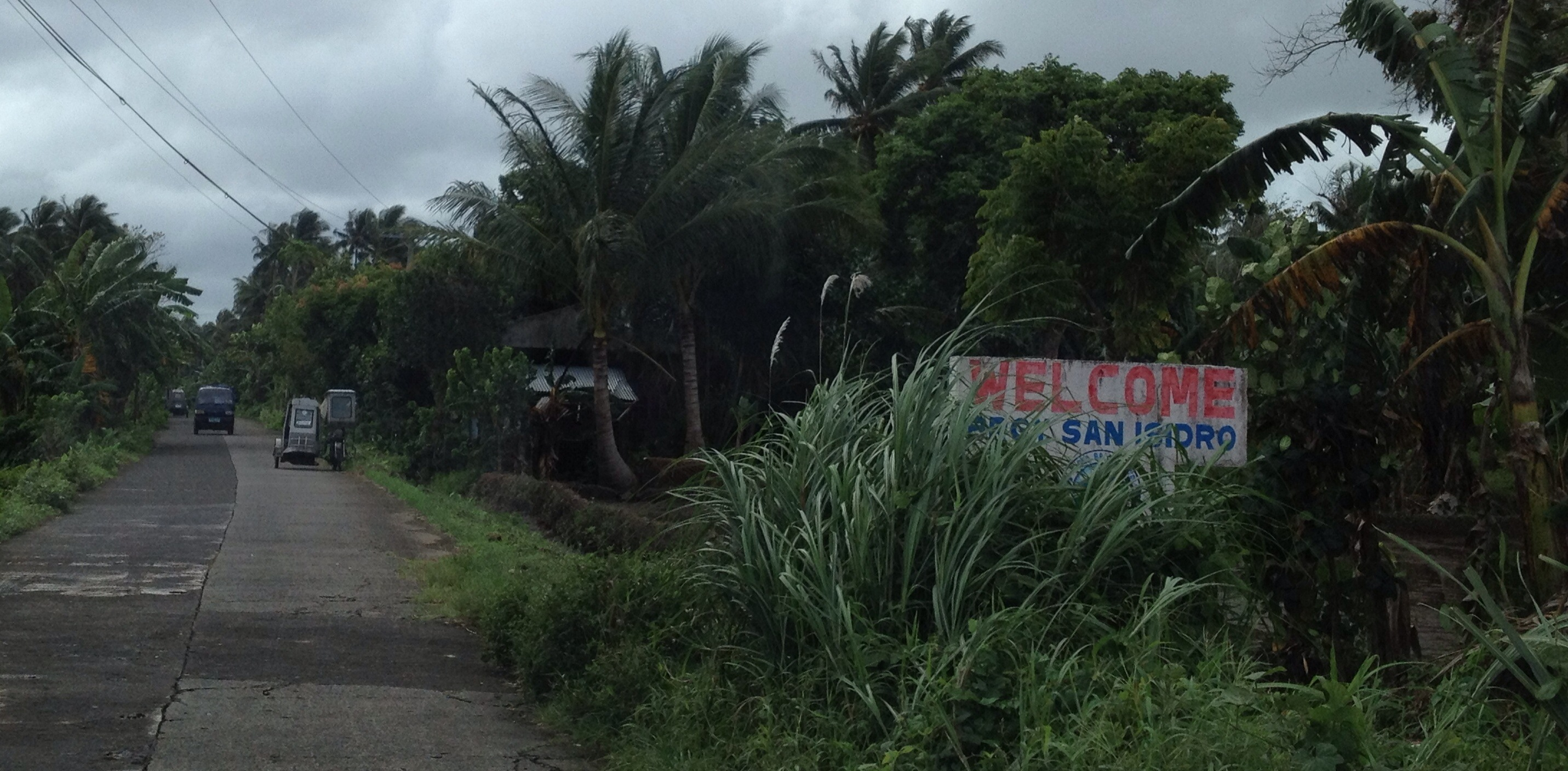
The partly hidden road marker of Brgy. San Isidro

- San Juan
- San Pascual
- San Ramon

The road marker of Brgy. San Ramon – the road connects San Isidro and San Vicente with the said barangay.

- San Roque – it hosts to the Bacon Community Airport. It borders Brgy. Maricrum in its east and Brgy. Bibincahan of the Sorsogon District. There is also a lone Inn (formerly San Roque cockpit house) in front of the community airport in Sitio Gabao.
- San Vicente
- Santa Cruz
- Santa Lucia
- Santo Domingo
- Santo Niño – the farthest barangay of Bacon District in the north, connecting to the municipality of Manito, Albay. It does not sit beside any barangays since it is bordered by unclassified forest land. The most practical transportation to reach it is by motorized banca due to lack of roads for light vehicles.
- Sawanga – where the famous Paguriran Lagoon is. It is the last barangay along the Bacon-Prieto Diaz road before crossing to the next town of Prieto Diaz.
- Sugod

== Gallery ==
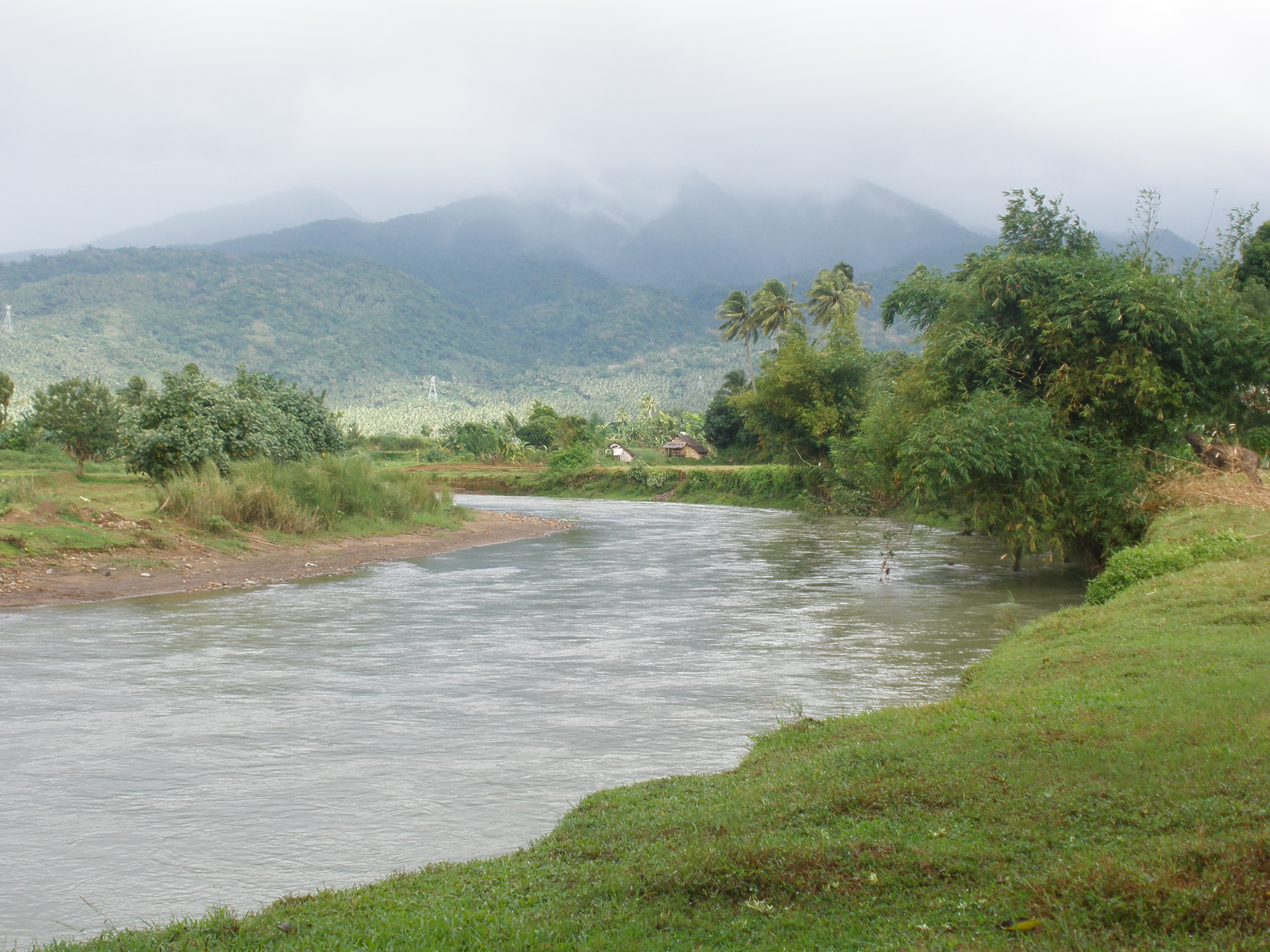
This is the section of Cawayan River located at Brgy. Barayong, Sorsogon City. The mountains in the background are part of Barangays Guinlajon and Basud.

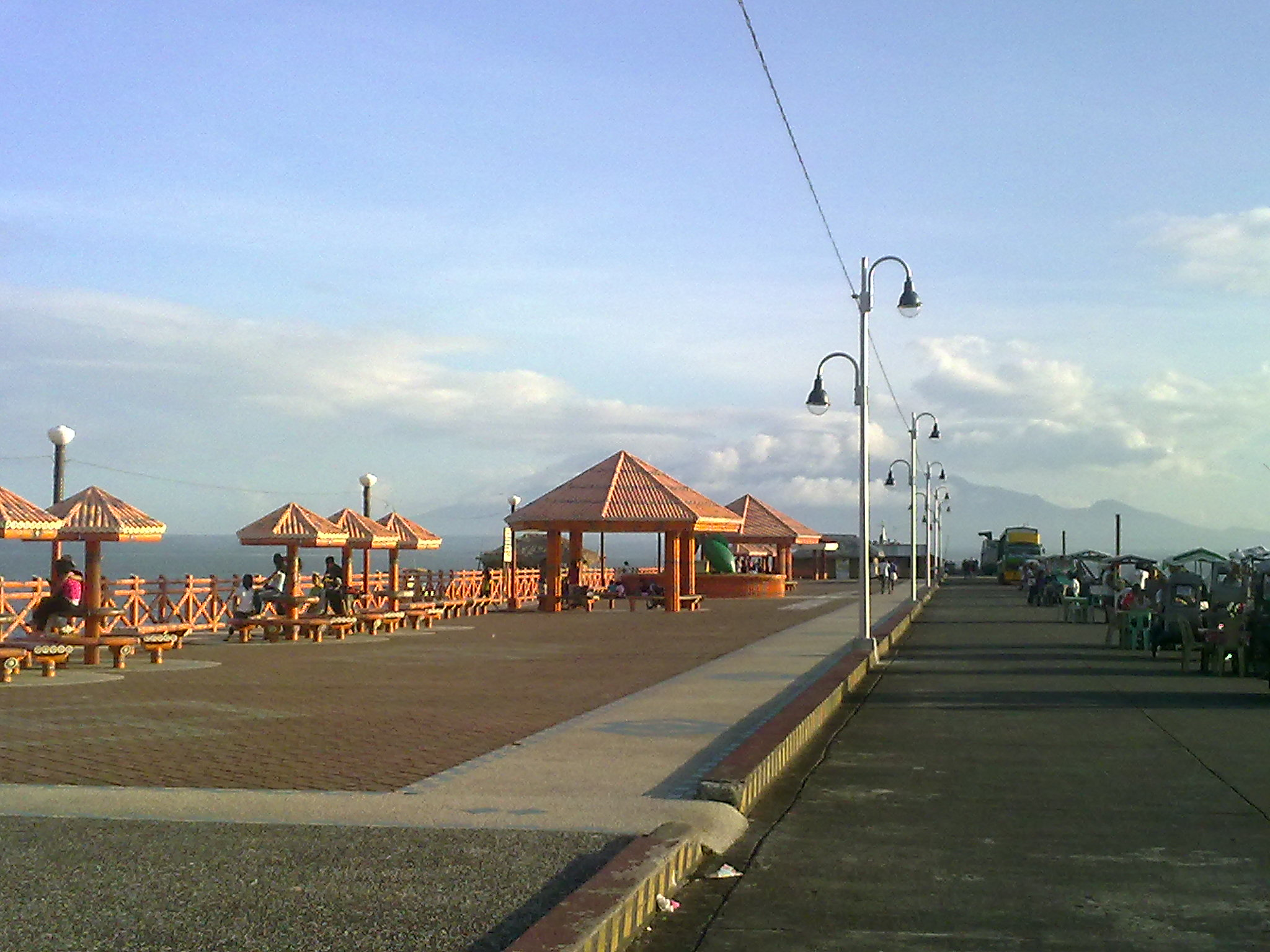
Rompeolas is located in the periphery of Talisay, just beside Sorsogon Pilot Elementary School.

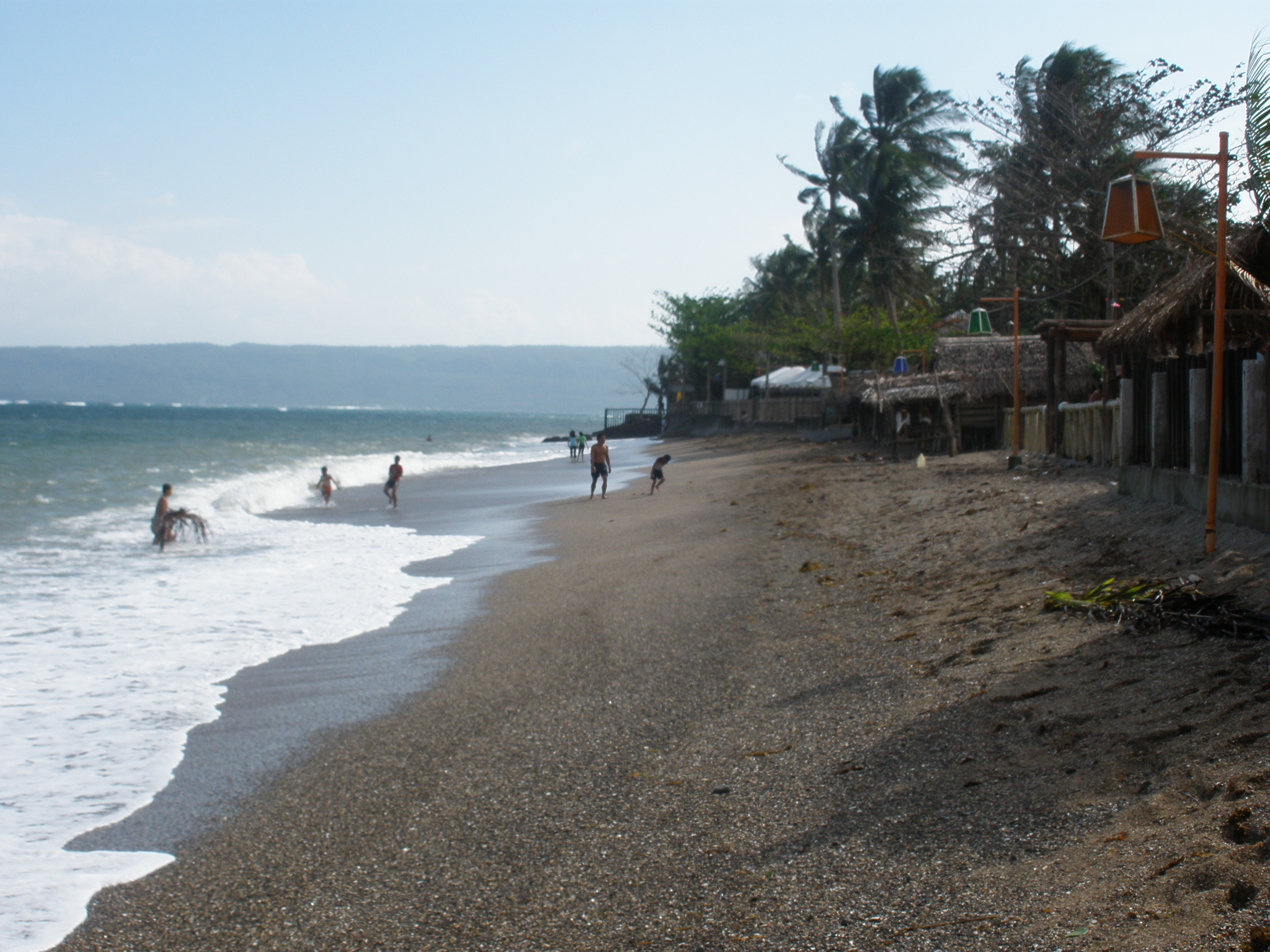
Tolonggapo Beach, facing south. The beach is located at Brgy. Caricaran, just east of Brgy. Poblacion in Bacon District.

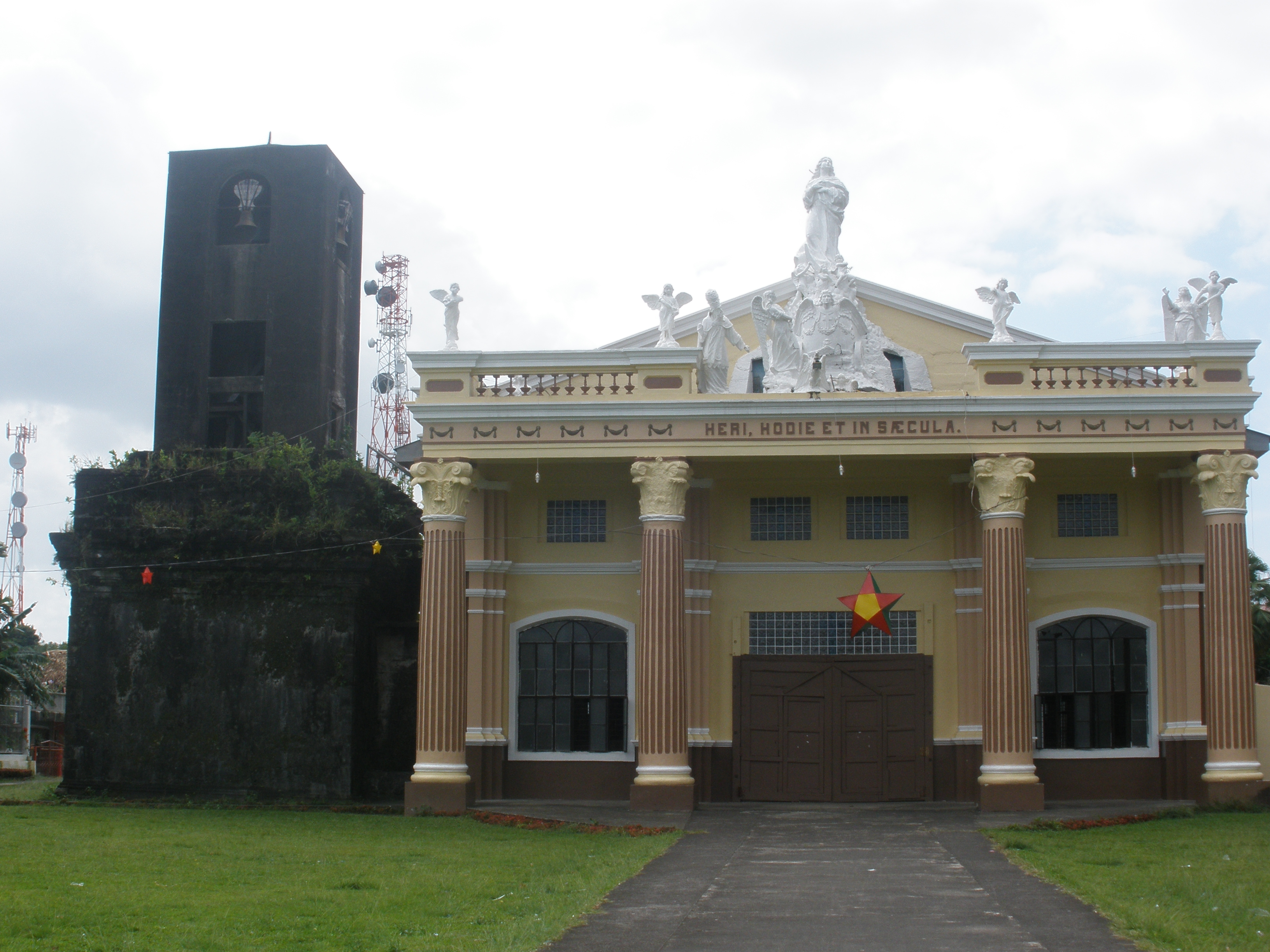
Our Lady of Annunciation Parish, located Brgy. Poblacion of Bacon district.

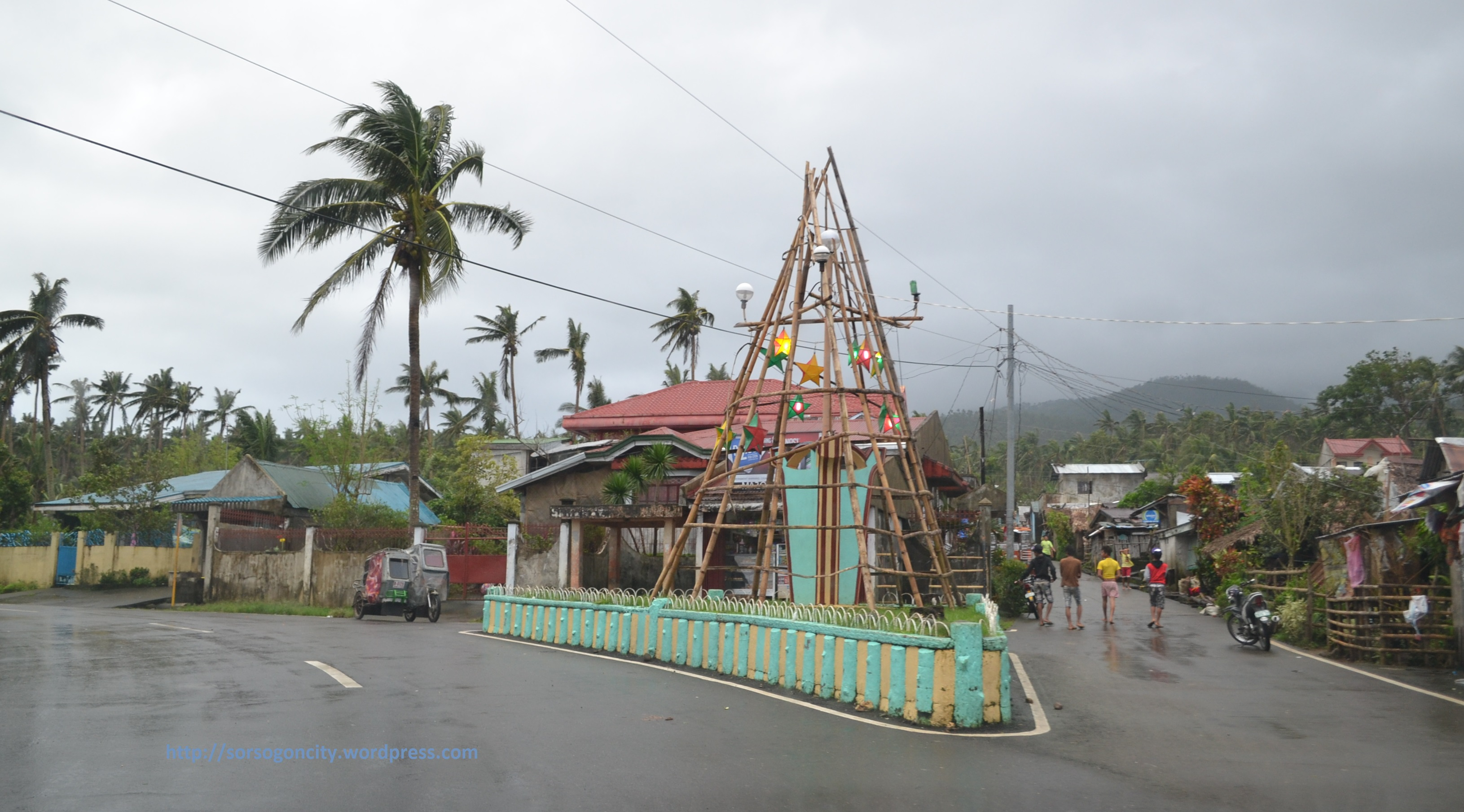
The main road junction in Brgy. San Juan: the road to the left is towards the Brgy. Poblacion of Bacon district, while straight ahead is towards the foot of the mountain.

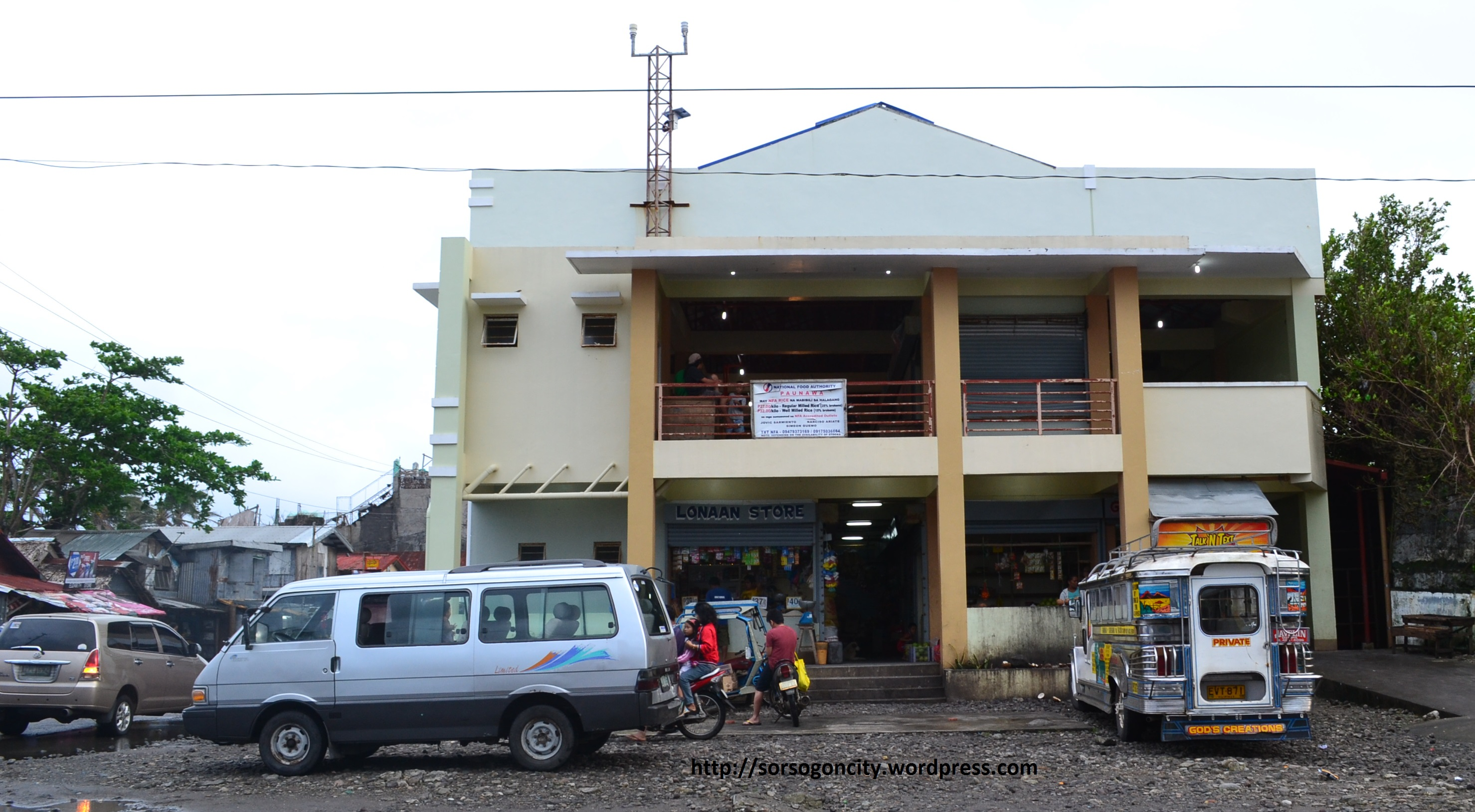
Bacon (district) Public Market, circa 2014.

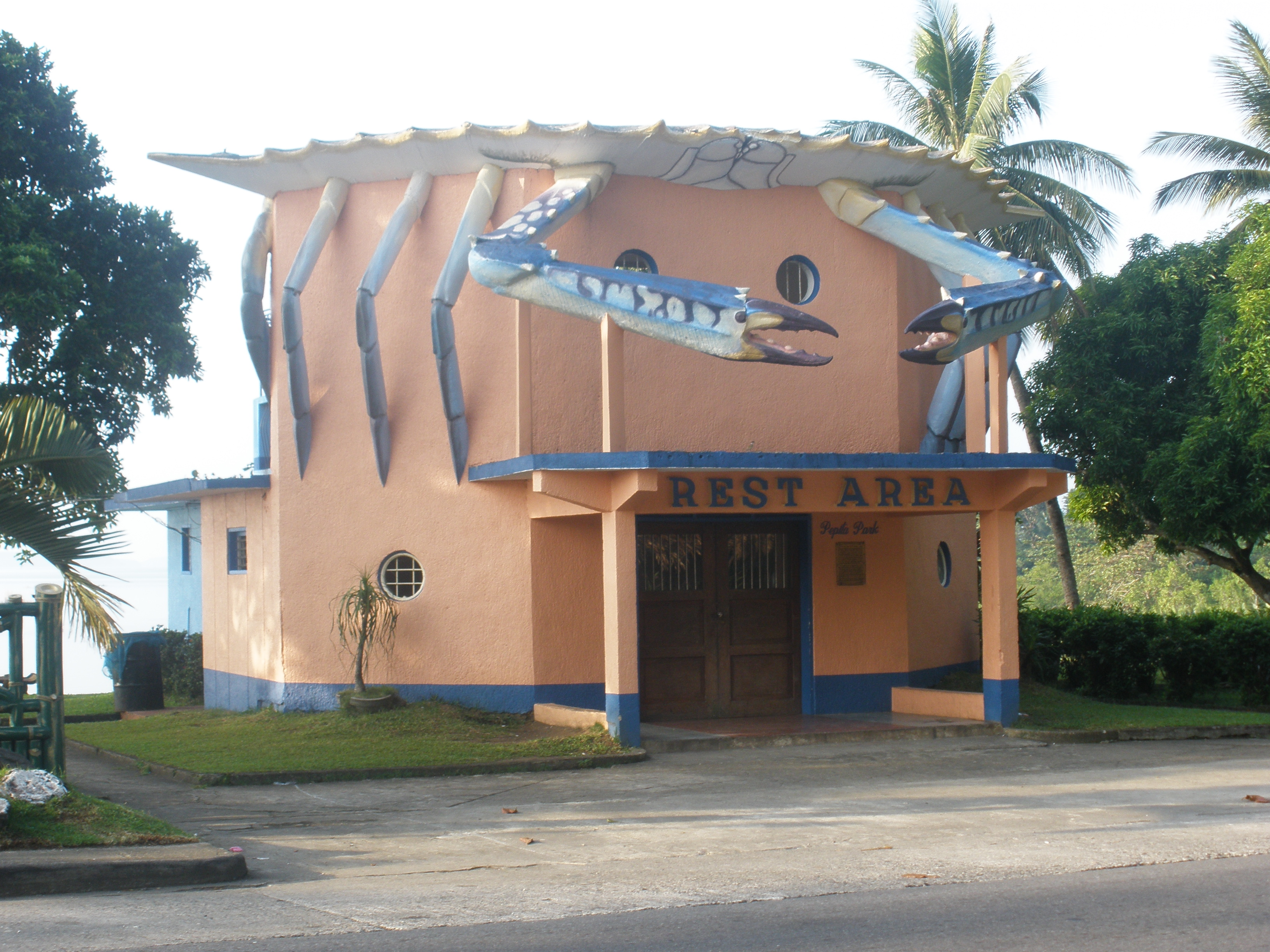
Pepita Park located in Brgy. Bucalbucalan.

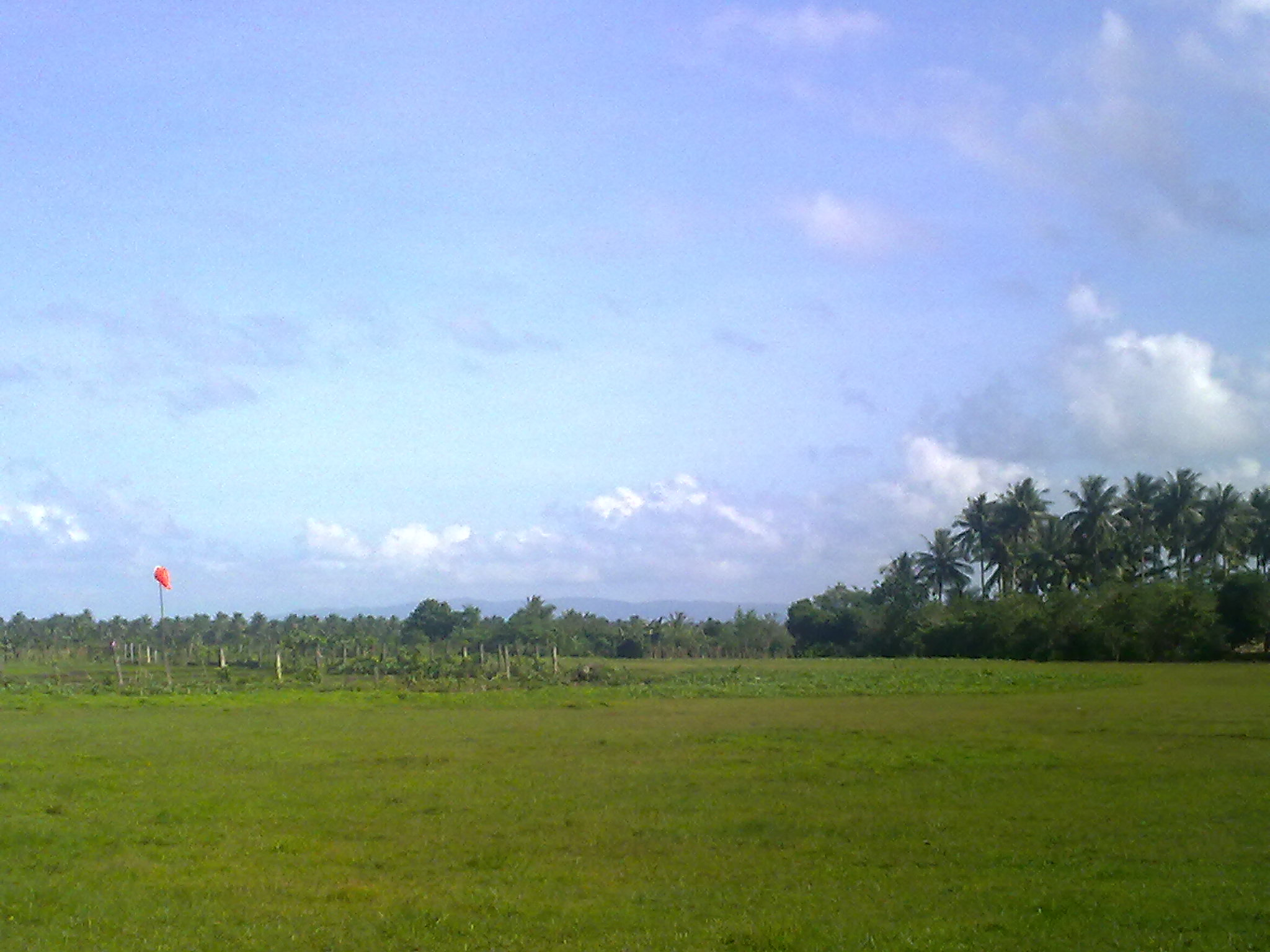
Dirt runway of the Sorsogon Community Airport (RPLZ) located in Brgy. San Roque of Bacon district.

The new SSS Building in Brgy. Guinlajon.

The chapel is located at Sitio Bisita, Brgy. San Isidro.

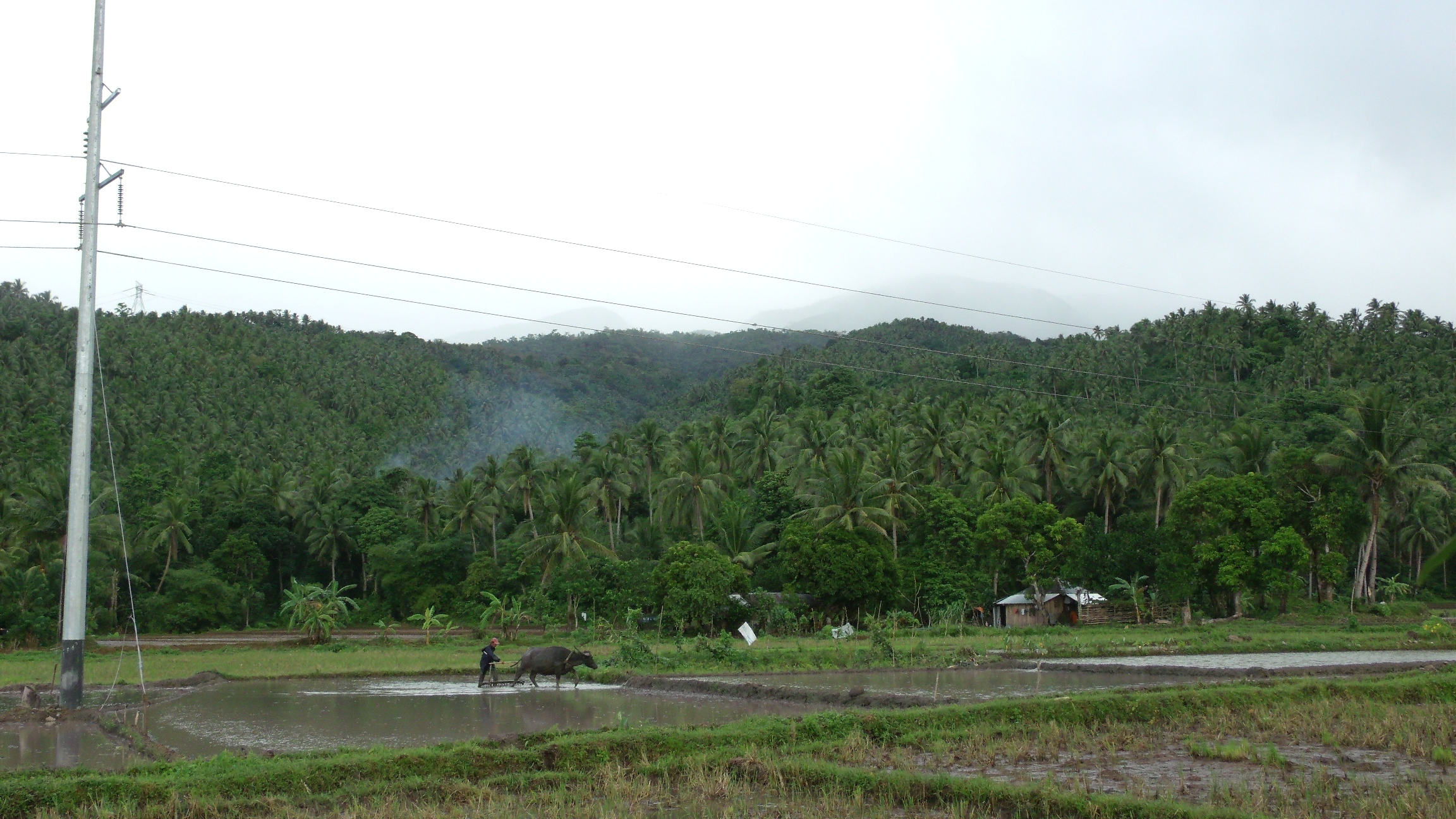
There is a wide tract of rice field in Brgy. Capuy due to its flat topography especially on the western side of the Pan-Philippine Highway (AH26). On its northern side are hills of coconut trees and different fruit bearing trees.

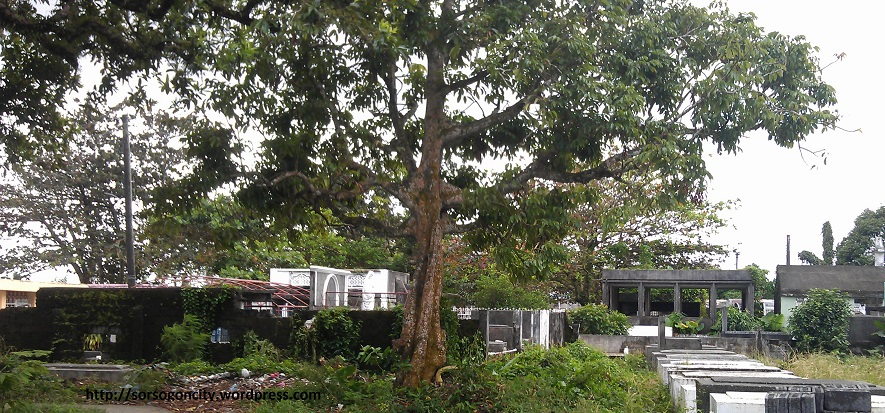
Sorsogon City's Catholic cemetery is located at Brgy. Sampaloc.

== Notes ==
Most of the information here came from a map of Sorsogon City from the material – Comprehensive Land Use Plan 2003–2012, Summary (Briefing Material), Sectoral Consultation, Vicanta Hall, Sorsogon City, November 27, 2003.
