= Sorsogon City =

Capital city of Sorsogon, Philippines

- Component city
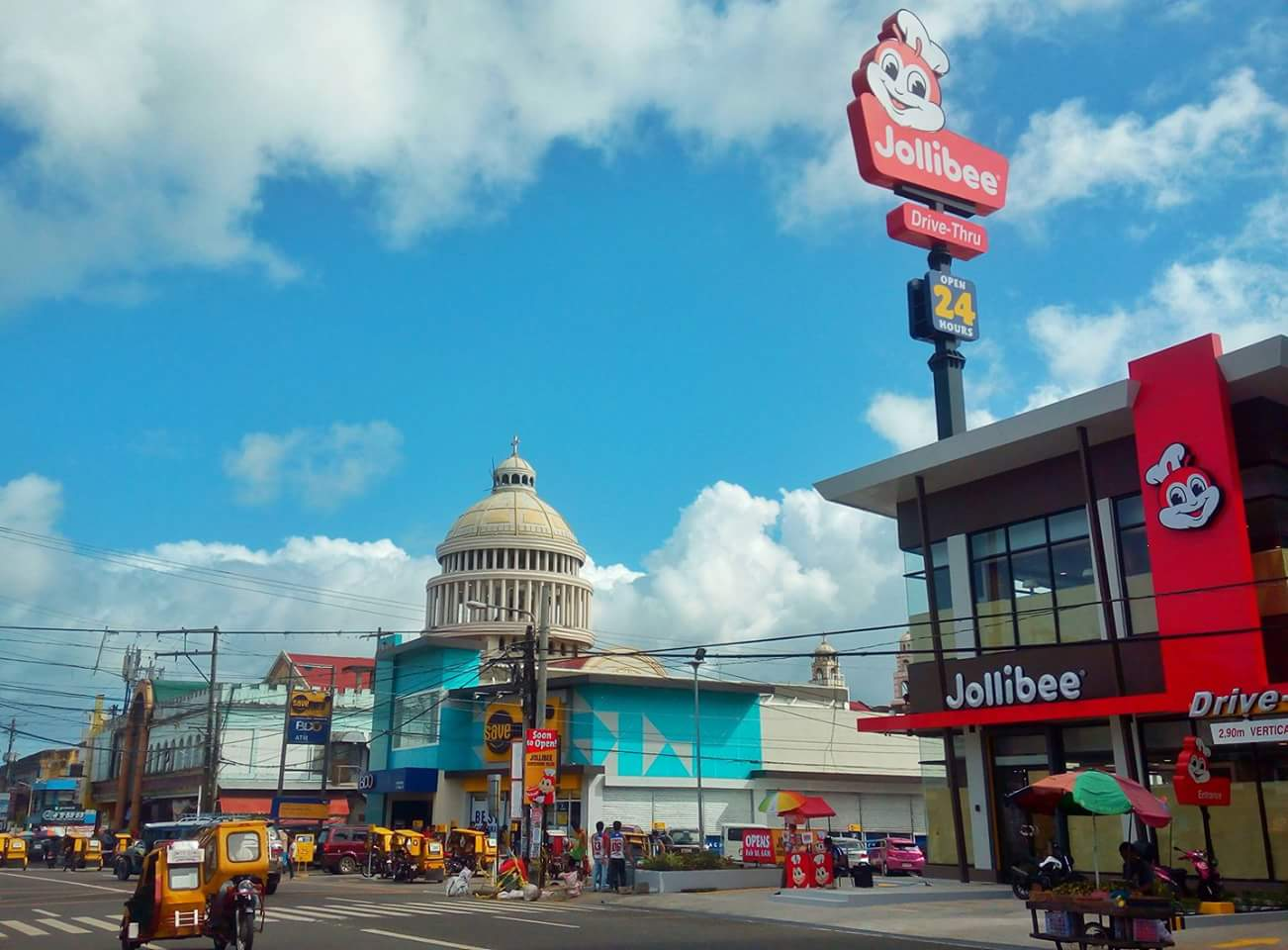
- Sorsogon City Downtown

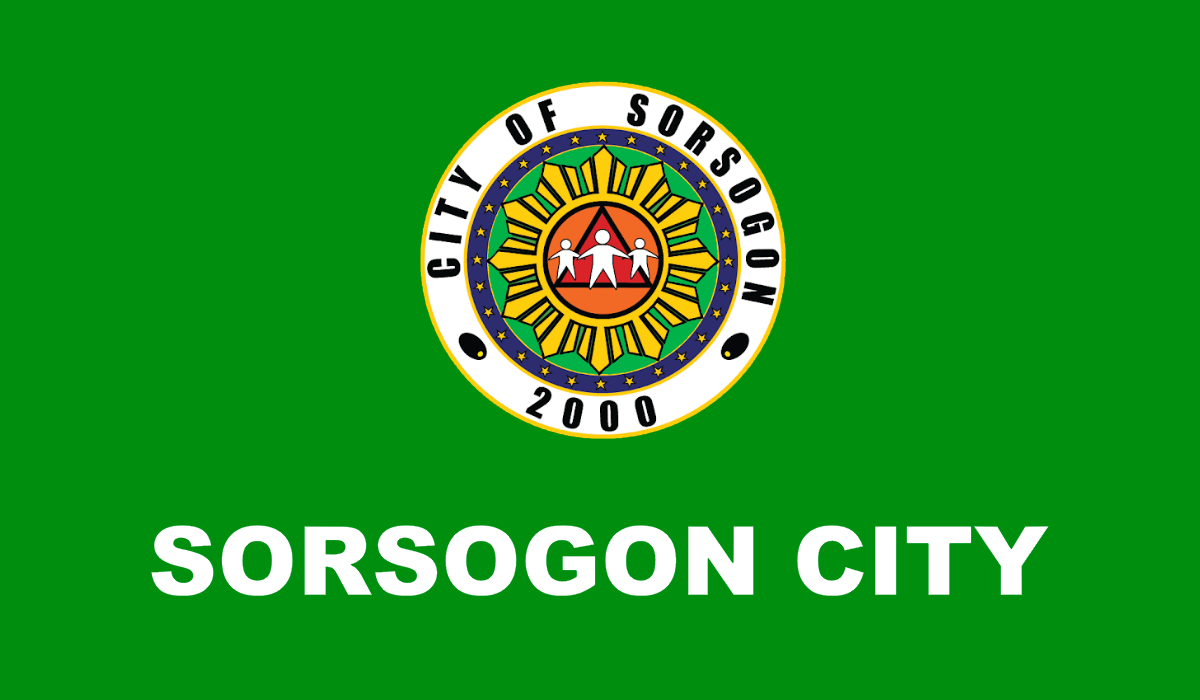
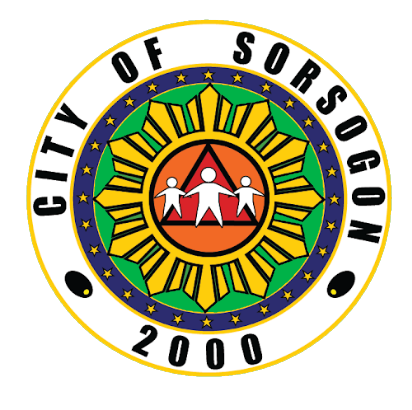
- Flag Seal
- Nickname: "Gateway to Southern Philippines"
- Motto: “Gayon Ciudad, Gayon Sorsogon” (Beautiful City, Beautiful Sorsogon)
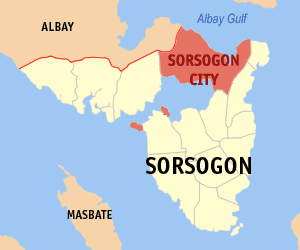
- Map of Sorsogon with Sorsogon City highlighted
- Interactive map of Sorsogon City
- Location within the Philippines Sorsogon City (Philippines)
- Coordinates: 12°58′27″N 124°00′21″E
- Country: Philippines
- Region: Bicol Region
- Province: Sorsogon
- District: 1st district
- Founded: February 28, 1895
- Cityhood: December 16, 2000
- Barangays: 64 (see Barangays)

Government
  - Type: Sangguniang Panlungsod
  - Mayor: Ma. Ester E. Hamor
  - Vice Mayor: Mark Eric C. Dioneda
  - Representative: Marie Bernadette G. Escudero
  - City Council: Members: 1st District; Jo Abegail C. Dioneda; Melchor P. Atutubo; Hilario D. Dioneda; Danilo A. Deladia; 2nd District; Ralph Walter R. Lubiano; Mary Ellen D. Jamisola; Franco Eric O. Ravanilla; Joven G. Laura; 3rd District; Nestor J. Baldon; Erwin J. Duana; Fernando David H. Duran III; Rebecca D. Aquino
  - Electorate: 114,140 voters (2025)

Area
  - Total: 276.11 km^{2} (106.61 sq mi)
- Elevation: 86 m (282 ft)
- Highest elevation: 1,078 m (3,537 ft)
- Lowest elevation: 0 m (0 ft)

Population (2024 census)
  - Total: 187,670
  - Density: 679.69/km^{2} (1,760.4/sq mi)
  - Households: 40,928
- Demonym: Sorsoganon

Economy
  - Income class: 2nd city income class
  - Poverty incidence: 23.82% (2023)
  - Revenue: ₱ 1,868 million (2024)
  - Assets: ₱ 3,677 million (2024)
  - Expenditure: ₱ 1,899 million (2024)
  - Liabilities: ₱ 1,193 million (2024)

Service provider
  - Electricity: Sorsogon 2 Electric Cooperative (SORECO 2)
- Time zone: UTC+8 (PST)
- ZIP code: 4700 (East & West districts), 4701 (Bacon district)
- PSGC: 056216000
- IDD : area code: +63 (0)56
- Native languages: Central Bikol; Tagalog
- Major religions: Christianity
- Website: sorsogoncity.gov.ph

Sorsogon City, officially the City of Sorsogon (Waray Sorsogon: Syudad san Sorsogon; Central Bikol: Syudad nin Sorsogon; Filipino: Lungsod ng Sorsogon), is a component city and capital of the province of Sorsogon, Philippines. According to the 2024 census, it has a population of 187,670 people.

Sorsogon City is the most populous city in the province, third most populous city in the entire Bicol Region and one of the leading cities in urbanization and most promising city in terms of development.

The component city was established on the year of 2000, from the merger of Bacon and Sorsogon municipalities. The city's total population spread across 64 barangays.

It serves a transshipment point from the Visayas and Mindanao provinces and is dubbed as the "Gateway to Southern Philippines". Sorsogon City is considered as one of the emerging cities due to its vibrant economy and growing population.

== History ==
Archaeological evidence indicates that human habitation in the area dates back around 3,000 years, based on remains found in a cave in Bacon and ancient burial sites discovered upstream along the Sorsogon rivers. When Spanish missionaries arrived in the 1600s, they encountered established settlements in these locations. Historical accounts also note that Moro raiders had already frequented the area’s waters prior to the arrival of the Spanish missions.

Bacon was established as a visita of Casiguran while Sorsogon, originally in Sitio Pocdol in Capuy, was then established as a visita of Bacon. Sorsogon then became an independent, full-fledged parish in 1628 due to an increase in population. The two parishes later became civilian political units.

The Pueblo Civil de Bacon was established in 1754, with Juan Elias as its first gobernadorcillo. Sorsogon became an independent pueblo in 1864. Both Bacon and Sorsogon were under the territorial jurisdiction of the province of Albay until the establishment of the independent province of Sorsogon on October 17, 1894.

In 1951, Sorsogon was made the center of the episcopal see of the then newly established Roman Catholic Diocese of Sorsogon comprising the Sorsogon and Masbate provinces, with the Saints Peter and Paul Parish Church in the town of Sorsogon as the designated cathedral.

=== Cityhood ===
Sorsogon City was created by virtue of Republic Act No. 8806, which was enacted on August 16, 2000, and ratified in December 2000.

== Geography ==
Sorsogon City covers a land area of 31,292 hectares (120.82 sq mi). It is at the southernmost tip of the Bicol Peninsula and of Luzon Island. The city is bounded by Castilla in the west, Manito in the northwest, Albay Gulf in the north, Prieto Diaz in the east, Gubat in the southeast, Casiguran in the southwest, and Sorsogon Bay in the south. Sorsogon is characterized by an irregular topography; mountain ranges on the north-west, sloping uplands on the central part of the city, plain areas southwestern and central north and southeast portion, and marshlands on the southeast deltas. It is also surrounded by water, with Sorsogon Bay to the west Albay Gulf to the northeast, and Philippine Sea in the east.

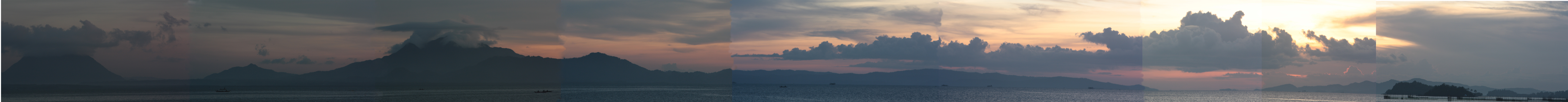
Panoramic view of Sorsogon Bay

Sorsogon City is 581 kilometres (361 mi) southeast of Manila and 60 kilometres (37 mi) south of Legazpi City. The 2015 Census puts the city's population at 168,110 with an annual growth rate of 0.84%. Sorsogon City ranked as the 3rd largest city in terms of population in the Bicol region. The only city in the province of Sorsogon, Sorsogon City is the largest in terms of land area in the Bicol region.

The Pan-Philippine Highway, which runs from northwest to southeast through the city, connects Sorsogon City to the municipalities of Castilla, Pilar, in the northwest towards Daraga, Legazpi City, Naga City and the rest of Luzon. It also connects to the municipalities of Gubat, Casiguran and the rest of the second district municipalities of the province of Sorsogon in the southeast.

=== Climate ===
Climate data for Sorsogon City
Month	Jan	Feb	Mar	Apr	May	Jun	Jul	Aug	Sep	Oct	Nov	Dec	Year
Record high °C (°F)	35 (95)	40 (104)	35 (95)	39 (102)	39 (102)	39 (102)	39 (102)	39 (102)	35 (95)	39 (102)	39 (102)	39 (102)	40 (104)
Mean daily maximum °C (°F)	31 (88)	31 (88)	32 (90)	34 (93)	34 (93)	33 (91)	33 (91)	33 (91)	33 (91)	33 (91)	32 (90)	31 (88)	34 (93)
Mean daily minimum °C (°F)	23 (73)	23 (73)	24 (75)	25 (77)	26 (79)	25 (77)	24 (75)	25 (77)	25 (77)	25 (77)	25 (77)	24 (75)	23 (73)
Record low °C (°F)	15 (59)	15 (59)	19 (66)	14 (57)	15 (59)	17 (63)	18 (64)	16 (61)	20 (68)	20 (68)	19 (66)	19 (66)	14 (57)
Average precipitation mm (inches)	293 (11.5)	227 (8.9)	209 (8.2)	166 (6.5)	189 (7.4)	203 (8.0)	231 (9.1)	196 (7.7)	271 (10.7)	295 (11.6)	387 (15.2)	539 (21.2)	3,206 (126.2)
Average rainy days	21	15	15	12	13	14	17	16	17	18	21	23	202
Source 1: http://www.myweather2.com/City-Town/Philippines/Sorsogon/climate-profile.aspx
Source 2: http://www.worldweatheronline.com/Sorsogon-weather-averages/Sorsogon/PH.aspx

Sorsogon City features a tropical rainforest climate with copious amount of rainfall throughout the course of the year. There is no pronounced dry season, but it has very pronounced maximum rain from November to January with December as the wettest month of the year, experiencing 23 days of rain. Temperature is constant throughout the year. Sorsogon City's average yearly rainfall is just over 2,671 mm (105.2 in). April is the driest month of the year which only sees 12 rain days and 2,671 mm (105.2 in) of rainfall. Average High temperature is at 38.08 °C (100.5 °F) and its Average Low temperature is at 24.5 °C (76.1 °F). The coolest month is January with a daily mean of 25.5 °C (77.9 °F) and the hottest months are jointly April and May with a daily mean of 28 °C (82.4 °F).

== Demographics ==
Historical population census of then Municipality of Bacon
Year	Pop.	±% p.a.
1903	14,536	—
1918	14,733	+0.09%
1939	18,351	+1.05%
1948	22,859	+2.47%
1960	21,723	−0.42%
1970	27,957	+2.55%
1975	28,546	+0.42%
1980	31,965	+2.29%
1990	32,810	+0.26%
1995	38,603	+3.09%
2000	42,166	+1.91%
Bacon ceased to exist as a separate municipality in December 2000. Source: Philippine Statistics Authority

Historical population census of then Municipality of Sorsogon
Year	Pop.	±% p.a.
1903	13,511	—
1918	16,694	+1.42%
1939	22,097	+1.34%
1948	26,004	+1.83%
1960	35,542	+2.64%
1970	47,734	+2.99%
1975	53,700	+2.39%
1980	60,574	+2.44%
1990	72,871	+1.87%
1995	83,012	+2.47%
2000	92,512	+2.35%
Sorsogon & Bacon merged in December 2000. Source: Philippine Statistics Authority

Population census of Sorsogon City
Year	Pop.	±% p.a.
1903	28,047	—
1918	31,427	+0.76%
1939	40,448	+1.21%
1948	48,863	+2.12%
1960	57,265	+1.33%
1970	75,691	+2.83%
1975	82,246	+1.68%
1980	92,539	+2.39%
1990	105,681	+1.34%
1995	121,615	+2.67%
2000	134,678	+2.21%
2007	151,454	+1.63%
2010	155,144	+0.88%
2015	168,110	+1.54%
2020	182,237	+1.71%
2024	187,670	+0.71%
Combined population of Sorsogon & Bacon; Source: Philippine Statistics Authority

Demographic statistics:

- Annual Growth Rate 1.69% for the period 2000 – 2007
- Population Growth Rate – 2.15% (1995–2000)
- Population Density - 627 persons per square kilometer
- Total Number of Households 30,290
- Male Population - 77,117
- Female Population - 74,337
- Religion – 95% Roman Catholic
- Labor Force – 56% of the total population, 1/4 of the over-15 years old is, at least, high-school graduate, 15% of the total workforce have college-level education
- Student Population - 15,323
- Voting Age Population - 83,123

== Economy ==
Poverty incidence of Sorsogon City (%)

Source: Philippine Statistics Authority

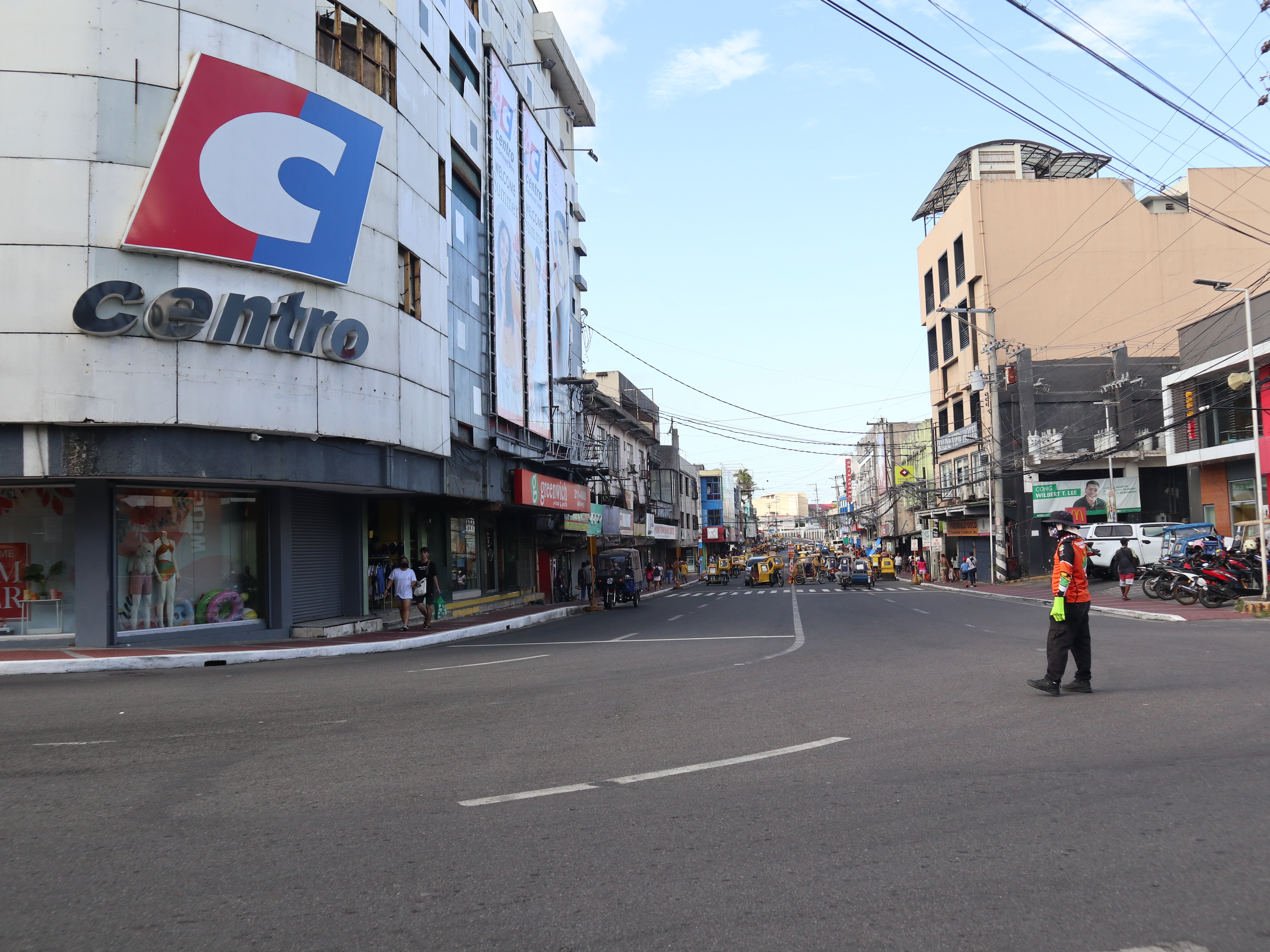
Rizal Street in downtown area

Sorsogon City is the economic center of Sorsogon Province and a hub of trade and commerce. It is one of the major cities in the Bicol Region after Naga City, Camarines Sur and Legazpi City in Albay. The city is a vital financial center housing numerous banks, non-bank financial institutions, manufacturing corporation and offices of major government departments and agencies. Although Sorsogon City does not have significant manufacturing industries, its dynamic service and agricultural sectors drive the economy forward.

In 2022 COA Report, Sorsogon City ranked third out of the seven cities in the Bicol Region with a total revenue of ₱1.42 billion pesos only after Legazpi City (₱1.84 billion) and Naga City (₱1.76 billion) making it part of the key urban centers in the region.

Sorsogon City is gradually becoming a major investment hub and is considered one of the emerging cities for doing business in the country. Investors in banking, real estate, retail, manufacturing and other business and industrial enterprises are similarly drawn to the city because of its rapid advancements of government infrastructure and business-friendly environment.

=== Banking ===
As of December 31, 2023, there are 30 banking offices operating in the city that offers banking services to businesses and residents according to Philippine Deposit Insurance Corporation. Sorsogon is the third city in Bicol Region, after Legazpi and Naga with a highest total deposits amounting to Php 17,699,836 from 224,682 accounts.

=== Retail ===
The city is home to a number of retail establishments. There were 3,475 business establishments in Sorsogon City as of 2022. There are 3 major shopping malls in the City of Sorsogon namely, SM Supermalls, Gaisano Capital and Citymall. It also attracted other local and national retail chains.

LCC Mall Sorsogon and Yashano Mall Sorsogon are two of Bicol's shopping malls that exemplify the ways in which economy is growing and adapting.

Meanwhile, SM City Sorsogon, the fourth SM Supermall in Bicol and the 81st in the Philippines, is located beside the Sorsogon Integrated Terminal Exchange (SITEX) and formally opened on October 28, 2022. The mall is located along Maharlika Highway, Balogo, East District in Sorsogon City. SM City Sorsogon spans 40,000 square meters of gross floor area, providing two levels of shopping, dining, and entertainment destinations that will further boost the city and province’s socioeconomic, cultural, and leisure activities. Among its amenities are three cinemas, a food court, wellness and services hubs, and amusement, leisure, and hobbies shops. Its parking space has more than 700 slots as well as a public transport terminal.

=== Real Estate ===
As Sorsogon City is strategically located at the southernmost tip of the island of Luzon and considered one of the emerging city in the Philippines. The real estate sector is starting to flourish with the entry of local and national real estate developers. Numerous local estate developers are starting to establish their footprints in the city.

The City Government of Sorsogon aims to provide housing and a home to informal settlers in the city thru Mayor Ester Hamor's 10+1 Agenda, Taas-Noo Ciudadano Ako Program - Mass Housing Program, a priority program of Mayor Hamor thru the construction of the Sirangan Tenements and Sampaloc Tenements - a twelve (12) building 2-storey socialized housing building for informal settler families around the barangays covering the inner Sorsogon Bay Area in Sorsogon City.

=== Road Networks ===
To decongest the Pan-Philippine Highway and to spur new developments outside the downtown area, two bypass roads were constructed in Sorsogon City, (1) the 7.654 kilometer Salvador Escudero III Diversion Road traversing Barangay Pangpang, Macabog, San Juan, Bibincahan and exits Brgy. Cabid-an, Sorsogon City and (2) the latest coastal road with a view of the Sorsogon Coastline, the 5.52 kilometer Sorsogon City Coastal Road, a four-lanes, consisting of rock causeways and three bridges traversing several barangays of Sirangan, Sampaloc, Balogo, Pangpang, Tugos, Cambulaga, and Talisay in Sorsogon City. It may be considered among the grandest of the Build-Build-Build projects in Bicol Region undertaken by DPWH Regional Office 5 and Sorsogon First District Engineering Office thru the effort of Senator Francis "Chiz" Escudero. Other than decongesting the heavy traffic in the main thoroughfare of Sorsogon City, this road was built to provide protection to the surrounding areas from storm surges especially the Bicol Region is among the most frequent path of typhoons entering the Philippine area of responsibility.

=== Industries and manufacturing ===
A number of companies have chosen the city to become the site for their industrial expansion. These include:

- Peter Paul Philippines Corporation, situated at Diversion Road, Cabid-an, Sorsogon City, has established production facilities to produce coconut juice, milk and cream, virgin coconut oil, paring cake and oil and desiccated coconut.
- Century Pacific Food one of the largest brand companies in the Philippines is to set up their sardines factory at Brgy. Abuyog, Sorsogon City for their 555 and Ligo products.

== Tourism ==
As a gateway to the Visayas and Mindanao, tourism plays a major part as a catalyst in contributing to Sorsogon City's economy. There are myriad of selections of attractions in the city that tourists can visit. Sorsogon City's points of interest, destinations, and attractions include:

Natural areas

- Paguriran Island and Lagoon
- Halabang Baybay Beach
- Tolong Gapo Beach
- Libanon Black Sand Beach
- Pagol Beach
- Buhatan River Tour and Firefly Watching
- Busay Falls

Historical locations

- Sorsogon Provincial Capitol Building (originally Constructed dated 1904)
- Dr. Jose Rizal Monument
- Annunciation Parish Church in Bacon (406 years as of 2022)
- Sts. Peter and Paul Cathedral

Library and Museums

- Museo Sorsogon
- Museo ng Gerilya ng Sorsogon (Gabaldon Building, Sorsogon East Central School)
- Sorsogon State University Library

Parks and Sceneries

- Pepita Park
- Sorsogon Capitol Park
- Sorsogon Rompeolas Park
- Sorsogon Coastal Road

Sports, Concert and Performing Arts Venues

- Sorsogon Sports Complex
- Sorsogon Coliseum
- Sorsogon City Convention Center
- Sorsogon Cultural Center for the Arts
- Sorsogon Provincial Gymnasium
- Sorsogon Lawn Tennis Center

== Government ==
The city's local government is headed by a mayor elected by popular vote. The Vice Mayor serves as the presiding officer of the Sangguniang Panlungsod (city council), with 12 Councilors elected by popular vote as its members. The Sangguniang Panlungsod serves as the city's legislative body and its role is to enact ordinances, approve resolutions, appropriate funds for the general welfare of the city and its inhabitants. Both the council members and the mayor serve three-year terms; and eligible for re-election for two more three-year terms.

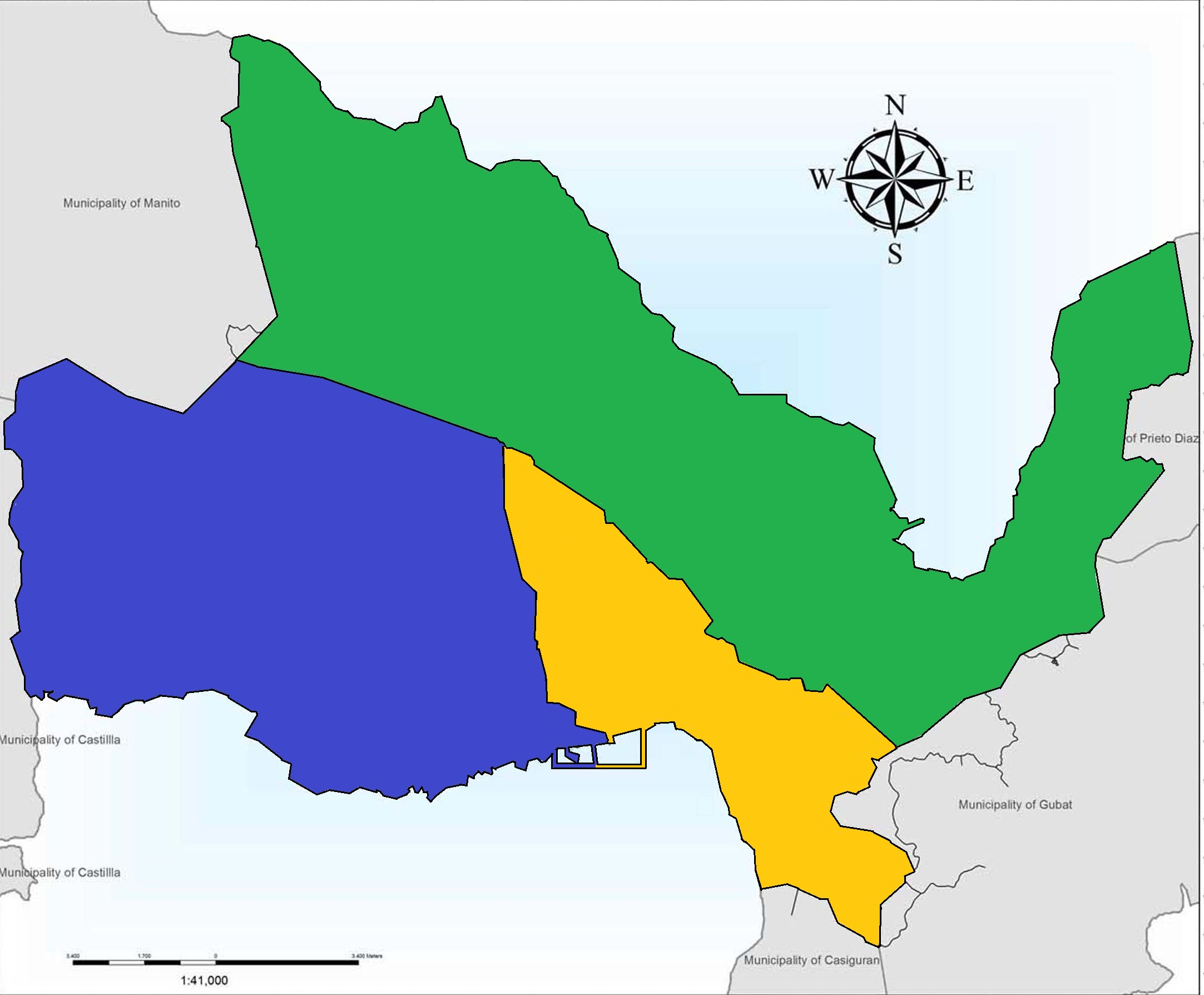
The 3 Districts of Sorsogon City shown in the picture: Marked in green is Bacon district, Yellow is the East District and in Blue, the West district.

Mayors of Sorsogon City
Mayor	Term
Sally A. Lee	June 30, 2001 – June 30, 2007
Leovic R. Dioneda	June 30, 2007 – June 30, 2013
Sally A. Lee	June 30, 2013 – June 30, 2019
Ester Hamor	June 30, 2019 – Present

Vice mayors of Sorsogon City
Vice mayor	Term
Edmundo Atutubo	June 30, 2001 – June 30, 2010
Bobet Lee Rodrigueza	June 30, 2010 – June 30, 2013
Charo Dichoso- Logronio	June 30, 2013 – June 30, 2016
Athan Balintong	June 30, 2016 – June 30, 2019
Eric Dioneda	June 30, 2019 – Present

== Local Government ==
2025-2028 City of Sorsogon, Sorsogon Officials
Position	Name	Party
Mayor	Ma. Ester E. Hamor	NPC
Vice Mayor	Mark Eric C. Dioneda	NPC
Bacon District
Councilors	Jo Abegail C. Dioneda	NPC
Councilors	Reynaldo C. Taladtad	NPC
Councilors	Hilario D. Dioneda	NPC
Councilors	Danilo A. Deladia	NPC
East District
Councilors	Maria Theresa S. Gonzales	NPC
Councilors	Lester R. Lubiano	NPC
Councilors	Angelu Magda P. Ravanilla	NPC
Councilors	Mark Jayson D. Jamisola	NPC
West District
Councilors	Peter Joseph J. Ravanilla	NPC
Councilors	Bryan J. Pingul	NPC
Councilors	Renalene Mae J. Duka	NPC
Councilors	Ma. Teresa D. Perdigon	NPC
Ex Officio Municipal Council Members
ABC President	TBD	Nonpartisan
SK Federation President	TBD	Nonpartisan

== Infrastructure ==
Sorsogon Sports Complex

In order to spur development in the city, The Toll Regulatory Board declared Toll Road 5 the extension of South Luzon Expressway. A 420-kilometer, four lane expressway starting from the terminal point of the now under construction SLEX Toll Road 4 at Barangay Mayao, Lucena City in Quezon to Matnog, Sorsogon, near the Matnog Ferry Terminal. On August 25, 2020, San Miguel Corporation announced that they will invest the project which will reduce travel time from Lucena to Matnog from 9 hours to 5.5 hours.

The Sorsogon Sports Complex (Formerly known as the Balogo Sports Complex) is a complex of sport facilities located at Brgy. Balogo and its still under rehabilitation. Sorsogon Arena which is the centerpiece of the complex has a total seating capacity of 15,000 spectators and with the total cost of ₱887 Million, the said sports complex will become the largest outdoor sports complex in the Southern Luzon and in Bicol Region. It is scheduled to host the Palarong Bicol, PRISAA National Games and Palarong Pambansa. Mohri & P.A. Associates are the architecture of that project with the total area of 56,218 sq. m. and a 4-storey Roman Colosseum-inspired stadium.

The Sorsogon Coliseum is a proposed indoor sporting arena located within the Sorsogon Capitol Compound in Sorsogon City is set to be a structure, seating 10,000 to 12,000 spectators.

The Sorsogon City Convention Center (SCCC) can now host big events such as conventions, exhibits, trainings and competitions. The 4,099 square meters facility can accommodate up to 2,500 spectators. It is located in City Hall Complex, Brgy. Cabid-an, Sorsogon City adjacent to Sorsogon Cultural Center for the Arts.

The Sorsogon Cultural Center for the Arts is a facility in the City of Sorsogon for audio and visual presentations and will house exhibit rooms and halls for shows and performances as well as offices. It was designed to be the country’s second main arts facility next to the Cultural Center of the Philippines (CCP). The 2,638-square meter edifice features an outdoor lobby, lounge lobby, vestibule, spectators’ area, orchestra pit, performance stage, and a seating capacity of 338 on the ground floor and 177 on the mid-floor level. The Sorsogon Cultural Center for the Arts will be a grand place to cover film and broadcast arts, as well as literary and visual arts.

The City Government of Sorsogon started to construct the 4-Level Sorsogon City Public Parking aims to address the roadside parking issues and ease traffic congestion. Due to the increasing number of motor vehicles plying the city roads and address the worsening traffic congestions in the central business district area in Rizal and Magsaysay Streets. It will also cater to the parking needs of marketgoers and businesses since it is well within the public market area. It is located in the area formerly Plaza Bonifacio, Brgy. Sirangan, Sorsogon City.

== Festivals ==
Pili Festival – This is Sorsogon City’s major festival in honor of the patron saints of the city, Sts. Peter and Paul. The Pili tree (and nut) is indigenous to the province and is known for its various practical, economic and nutritional applications. This festival aims to emphasize its importance, and heightens awareness of the pili. The fiesta’s big attraction is the street dance in which elaborately costumed dancers depict the many uses of the tree. This is celebrated every last week of June (June 29) and usually a week-long celebration (June 19 to 29).

== Transportation ==
=== Land ===
Much of the city's population rely on public transportation such as tricycles and jeeps to get around the city. The city boasts its color-coded public transportation system which it has pioneered in the region. All tricycles have its own color code depending on the district, zone or route that it is serving. Inter-town trips are served by the new airconditioned e-jeepneys while inter-provincial trips are served by the UV Express Vans and number of bus companies operating provincial and regional routes, with the modern Sorsogon Integrated Terminal Exchange (SITEX) serving as the terminus.

=== Air ===
The city is 1-hour away from the Bicol International Airport located in Daraga, Albay.

The Sorsogon City Domestic Airport is a proposed airport development project located at Barangay Gabao, Bacon District, Sorsogon City. The Provincial Government of Sorsogon has released the proposed design for the upgrading of the existing Bacon Community Airport to a domestic airport. This airport development will propel growth in different sectors, such as trade, employment and tourism. Governor Edwin "Boboy" Hamor has been very vocal in pushing for the airport rehabilitation project which aims to make travel to and around the province's convenient and seamless. Accordingly, construction of the airport is due to commence in March 2024 and it will take three (3) years to complete and is expected to cater more passengers which aims to boost economic activities in the province.

== Education ==
There are four schools district offices which govern all educational institutions within the city under the Schools Division of Sorsogon City. The schools division office oversees the management and operations of schools districts which handle all private and public, from primary to secondary schools. These are the:

- Bacon East Schools District
- Bacon West Schools District
- Sorsogon East Schools District
- Sorsogon West Schools District

== Notable personalities ==
- Aldin Ayo - a former Sorsogon City councilor who had coaching stints with Letran Knights, De La Salle Green Archers, UST's Growling Tigers to name a few. Currently the head coach of the Converge FiberXers in the PBA.
- Eddie Garcia – Film actor and director
- Eugenia Apostol - one of the founders of Philippine Daily Inquirer
- Francis "Chiz" G. Escudero – former congressman (1998–2007) of Soesogon's First District, former Sorsogon governor (2019–2022), served 3 terms as a senator (2007–2019) and currently serving as the Senate President.
- Jessie Dellosa – former Armed Forces of the Philippines Chief of Staff. He was born in the former town of Bacon, now a district in the city.
- Jorge Barlin – First Filipino and Bikolano Bishop and was assigned parish priest and Vicar Forane of Sorsogon from 1887 to 1906
- Loida Nicolas Lewis – chairwoman and chief executive officer of TLC Beatrice, LLC, the Lewis Family investment firm and is also chairman and CEO of TLC Beatrice (China) and TLC Beatrice Foods (Philippines).
- Mary Walter – actress, whose career spanned through several decades. She was born in Bacon.

== Sister cities ==
=== Local ===
- (Philippines) Legazpi, Albay

=== International ===
- Ceuta, Spain
- Sterling Heights, Michigan, United States
