= La Union =

- Province
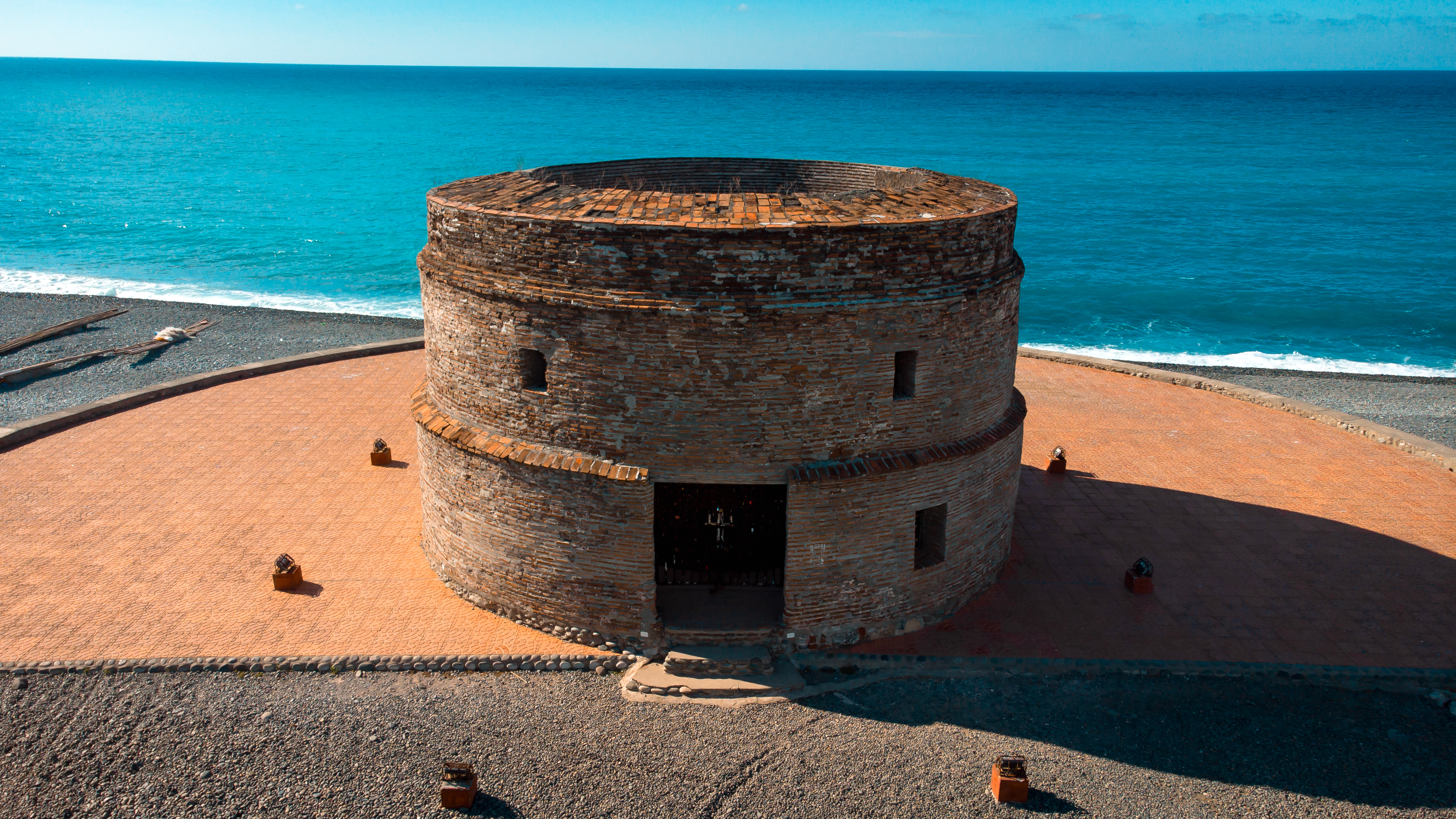
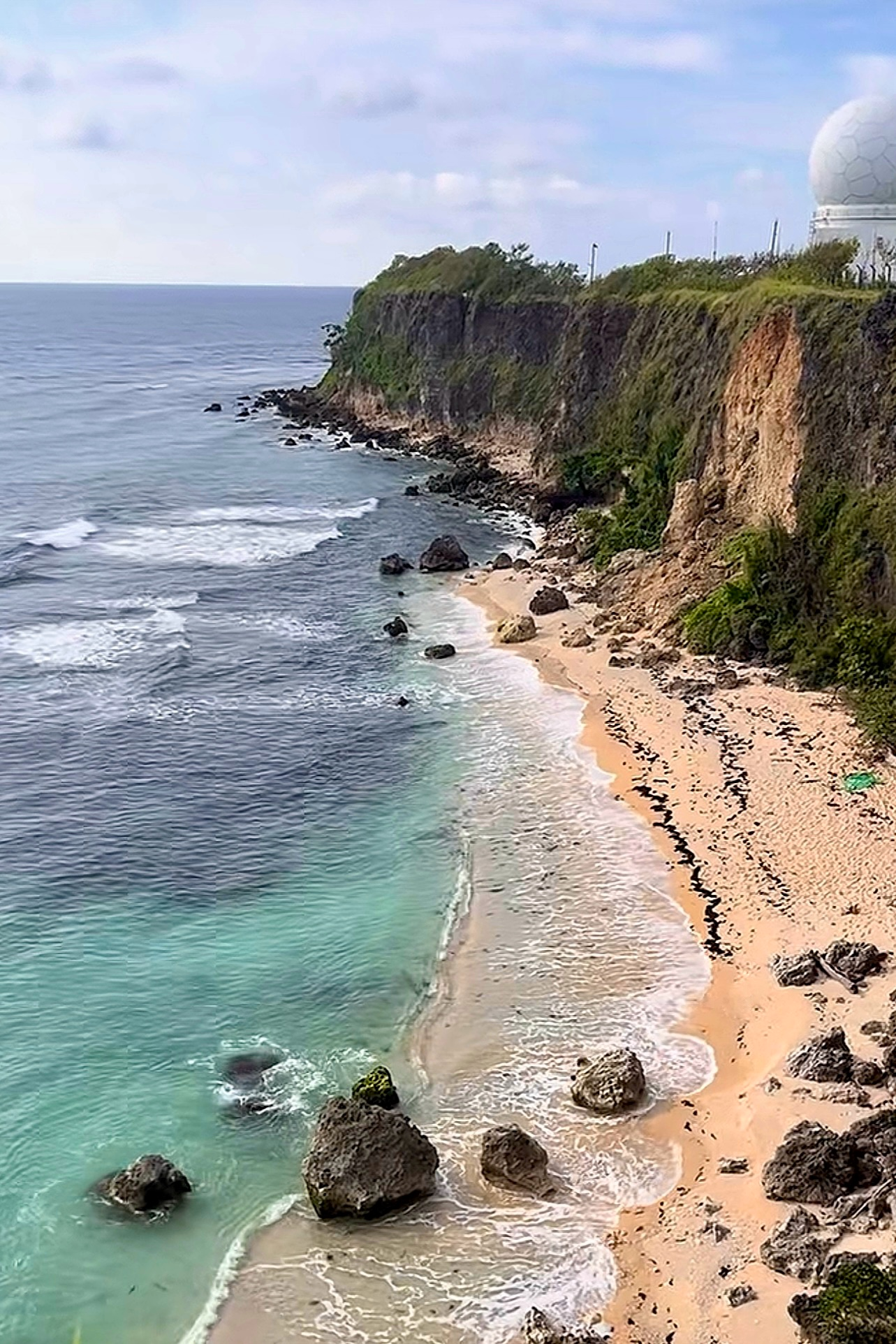
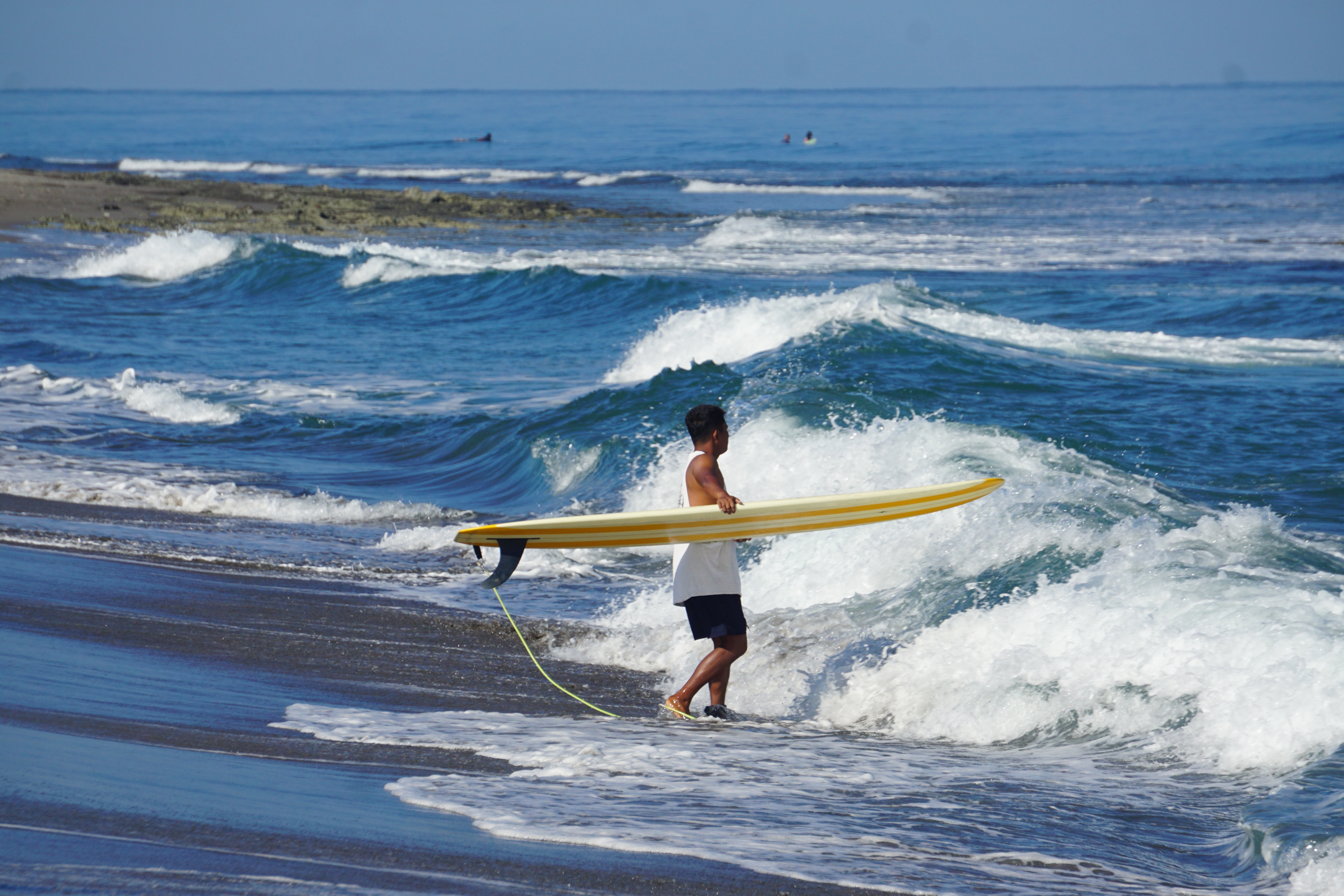
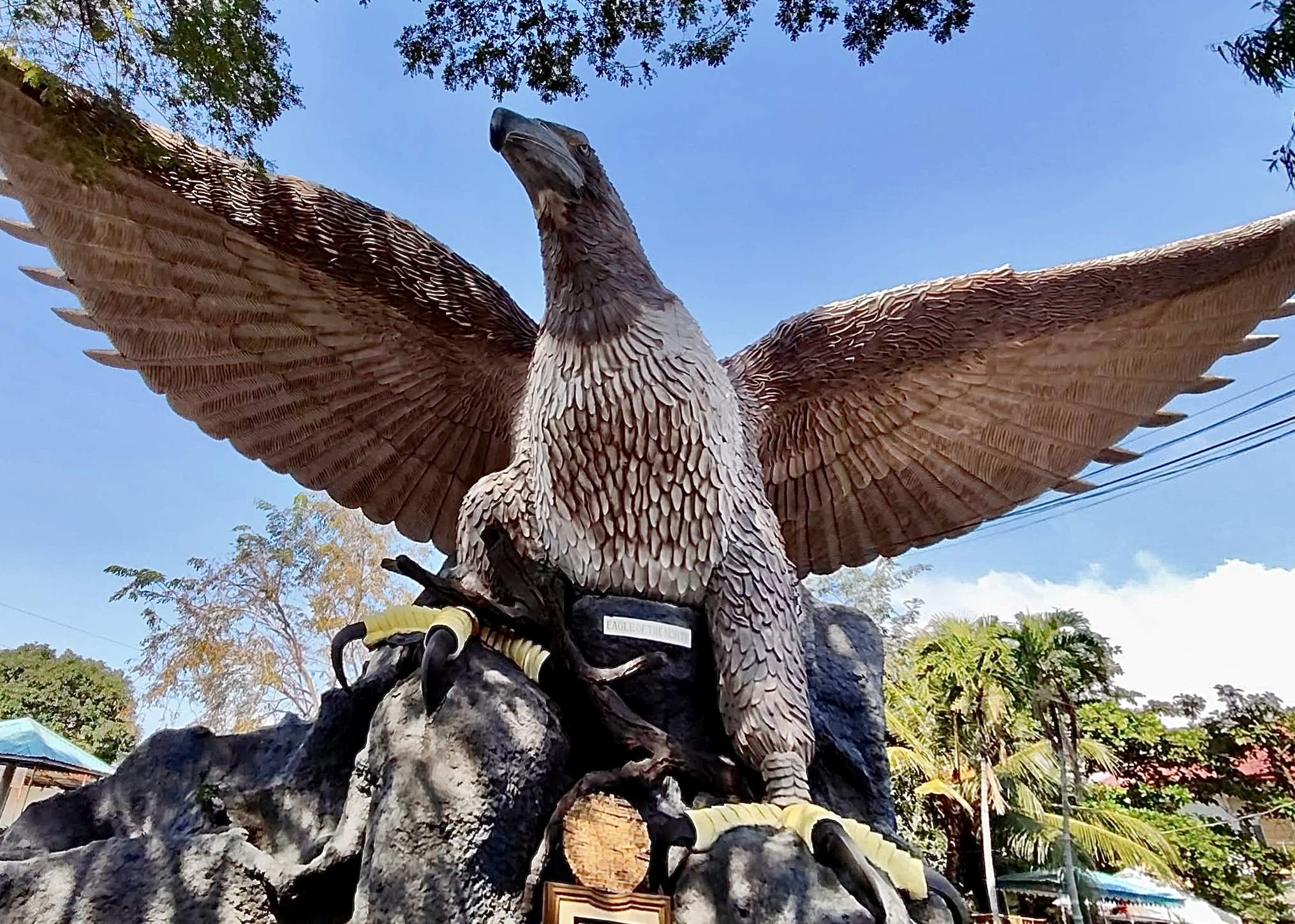
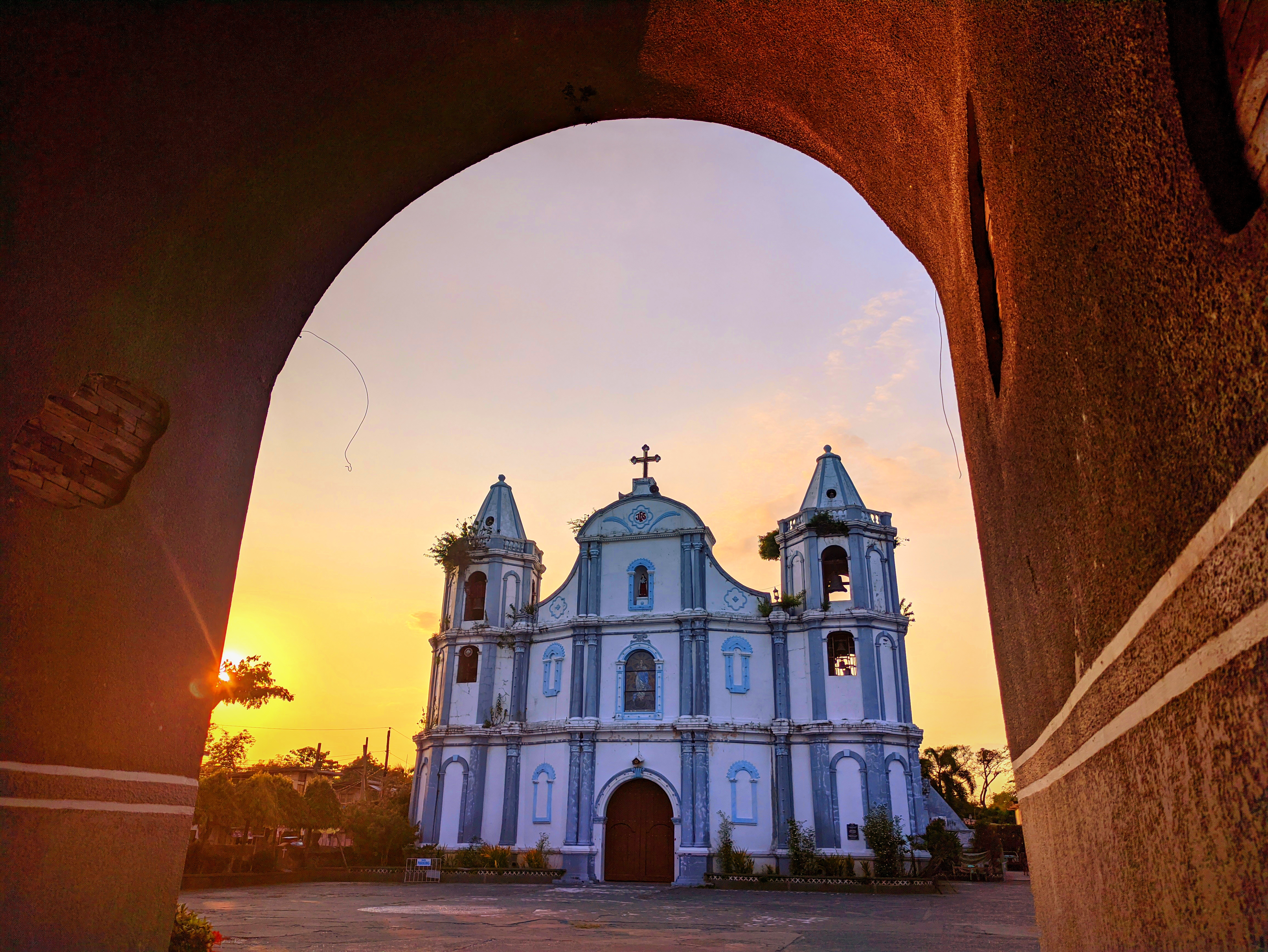
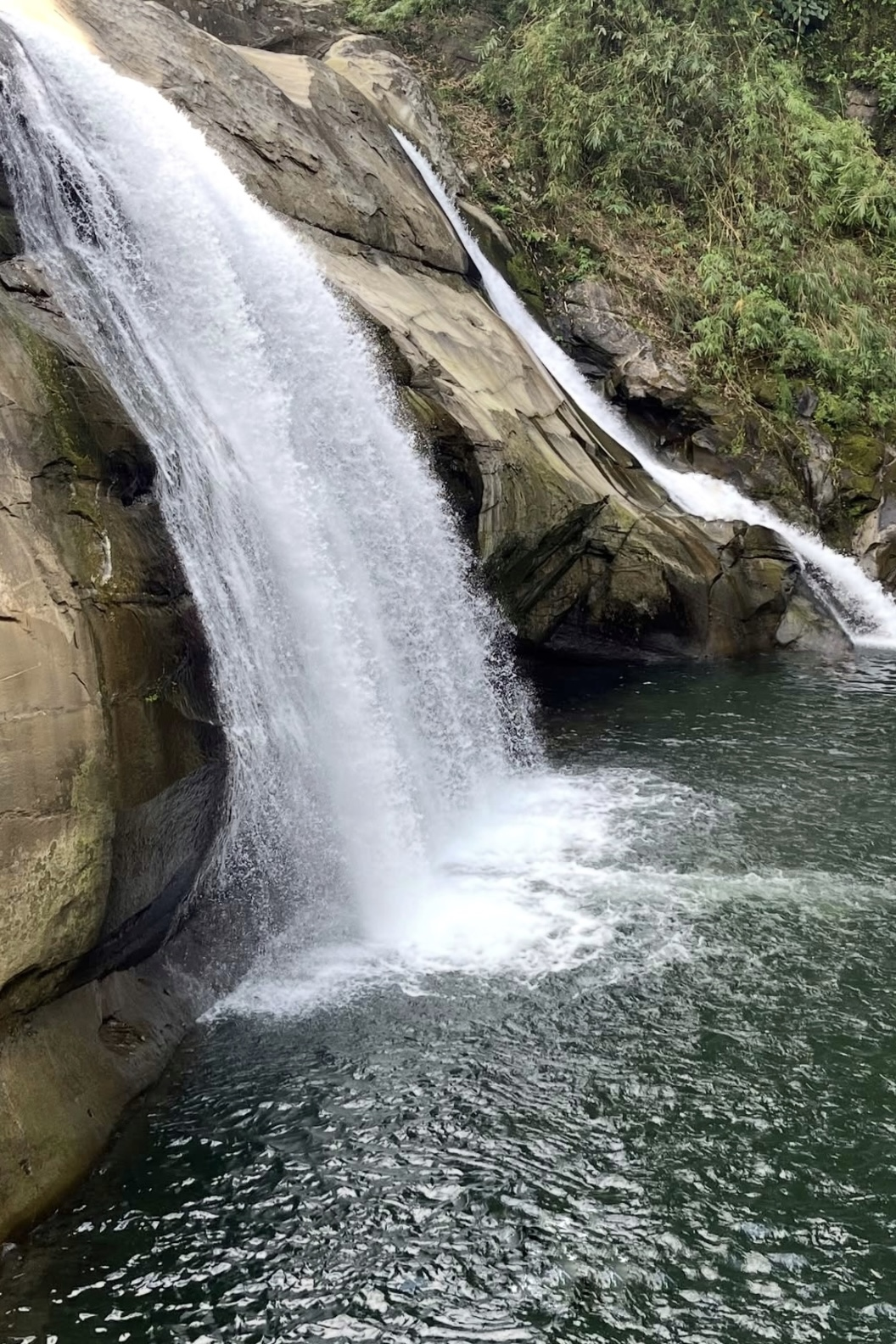
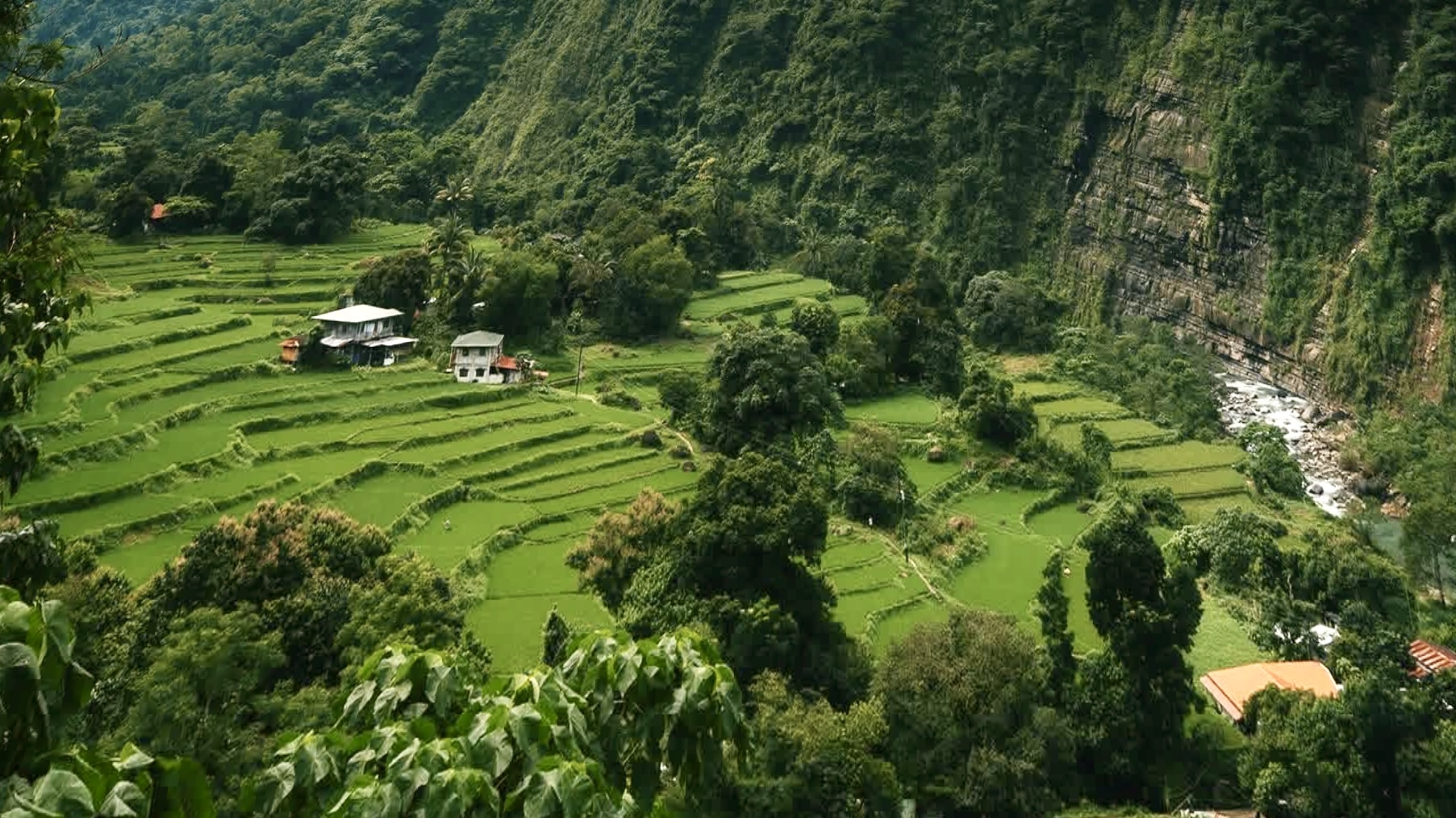
- From top, left to right: Baluarte Watch Tower, Poro Point Cliff, Urbiztondo Surftown, Ma-Cho Taoist Temple, Eagle of the North Park, Namacpacan Church, Tangadan Falls, & Bolikewkew Rice Terraces

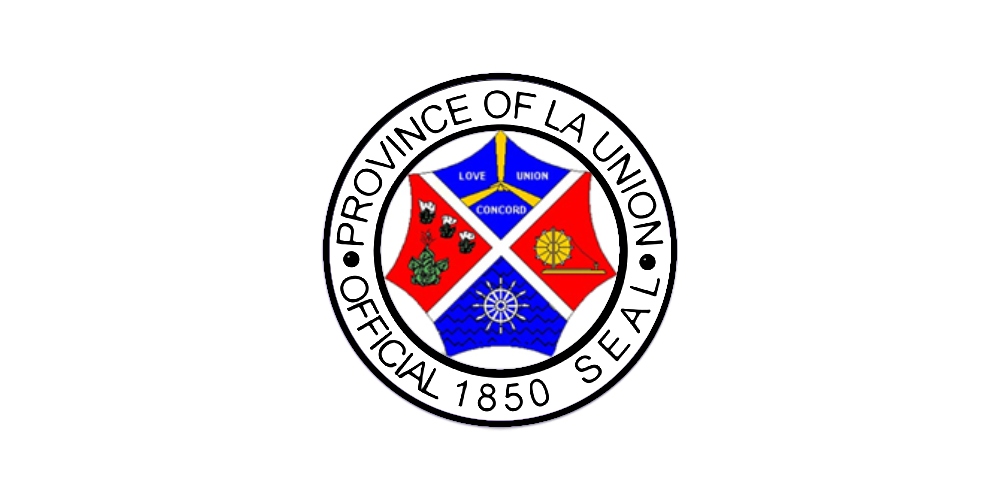
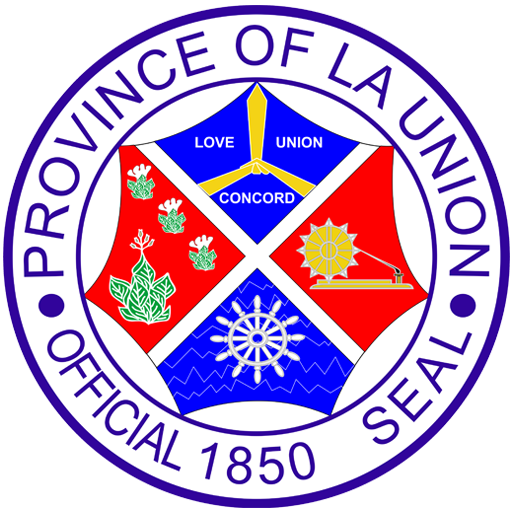
- Flag Seal
- Nickname: Elyu
- Motto(s): "Love, Union, Concord"
- Anthem: La Union Hymn
- Location in the Philippines
- Interactive map of La Union
- Coordinates: 16°30′N 120°25′E
- Country: Philippines
- Region: Ilocos Region
- Founded: 2 March 1850
- Capital and largest city: San Fernando

Government
  - Governor: Mario Eduardo Ortega (PFP)
  - Vice Governor: Eric O. Sibuma (Lakas-CMD)
  - Legislature: La Union Provincial Board
  - Electorate: 554,274 voters (2025)

Area
  - Total: 1,497.70 km^{2} (578.27 sq mi)
  - Rank: 69th out of 82
- Highest elevation (Mount Mugong): 1,520 m (4,990 ft)

Population (2024 census)
  - Total: 825,072
  - Rank: 37th out of 82
  - Density: 550.893/km^{2} (1,426.81/sq mi)
  - Rank: 9th out of 82
  - Households: 205,034
- Demonyms: Elyucano; La Unionen; La Unionense

Divisions
  - Independent cities: 0
  - Component cities: 1: San Fernando
  - Municipalities: 19: Agoo; Aringay; Bacnotan; Bagulin; Balaoan; Bangar; Bauang; Burgos; Caba; Luna; Naguilian; Pugo; Rosario; San Gabriel; San Juan; Santo Tomas; Santol; Sudipen; Tubao
  - Barangays: 576
  - Districts: Legislative districts of La Union

Economy
  - Income class: 1st provincial income class
  - Poverty incidence: 6.3% (2023)
  - Revenue: ₱ 4,090 million (2024)
  - Assets: ₱ 11,279 million (2024)
  - Expenditure: ₱ 2,675 million (2024)
  - Liabilities: ₱ 1,150 million (2024)
- Time zone: UTC+8 (PHT)
- PSGC: 013300000
- IDD : area code: +63 (0)72
- ISO 3166 code: PH-LUN
- Spoken languages: Ilocano (official); Pangasinan; Kankanaey; Ibaloi; Tagalog; English
- Website: www.launion.gov.ph

La Union (Tagalog pronunciation: [lɐ ʔʊˈɲon]), officially the Province of La Union (Ilocano: Probinsia ti La Unión; Pangasinan: Luyag na La Unión; Kankanaey: Probinsya di La Unión; Ibaloi: Probinsya ni La Unión; Tagalog: Lalawigan ng La Unión; Spanish: Provincia de La Unión), is a coastal province in the Philippines situated in the Ilocos Region on the island of Luzon. The province's capital, the City of San Fernando, is the most populous city in La Union and serves as the regional center of the Ilocos Region.

Bordered by Ilocos Sur to its north, Benguet to its east, and Pangasinan to its south, with the South China Sea to the west, La Union is located 273 kilometers (170 mi) north of Metro Manila and 57 kilometers (35 mi) northwest of Baguio City. The province spans an area of 1,497.70 square kilometers (578.27 sq mi). As of the 2020 census, La Union had a population of 822,352, resulting in a density of 550 inhabitants per square kilometer or 1,400 inhabitants per square mile. The province had 538,730 registered voters as of 2022. The province official language is Iloco (Ilocano), as declared by the provincial government of La Union.

== History ==
=== Early history ===
During its early history, the province was inhabited by various ethnolinguistic groups, including the Ilocanos, Pangasinenses, and Cordillerans (Igorots), who actively engaged in trading and bartering while practicing animistic and polytheistic indigenous religions and traditions.

In the northern section, early settlements were established along the coastal plains of Purao (now Balaoan), Darigayos, and the areas surrounding the Amburayan River. These settlements were primarily inhabited by the Samtoy (Ilocanos). Historian William Henry Scott documented that Balaoan was historically referred to as being "rich in gold" due to its proximity to the gold mines in the Cordillera region. The town served as an emporium for the exchange of Igorot gold through barter and trade among lowlanders, highlanders, and foreign merchants in Tagudin. Similarly, Baratao (now Bauang) has been identified by historians as a settlement of comparable importance to Purao as emporium of gold mines.

In the southern section, the areas of Agoo and Aringuey (now Aringay) were early settlements of the Pangasinenses. Agoo functioned as a trading port with Sual as its only rival. Agoo was frequented by Japanese and Chinese ships, whose merchants engaged in commerce or bartered gold with natives. Aringuey served as a coastal maritime trading hub and the terminus of the Aringay-Tonglo-Balatok gold trail, located along the delta of the Aringay (Ifugao) River. This route facilitated the transport of gold from the Ibaloi villages of Acupan and Balatok in the southern areas of present-day Benguet to the trading centers of Aringay, with further distribution to the port settlement of Agoo.

These trading activities were part of a larger maritime exchange network that extended across the Indian Ocean and the South China Sea. Products exchanged within this network included porcelain, silk, cotton, beeswax, gems, beads, and precious minerals, with gold being a significant commodity. Artifacts like porcelain and pottery, uncovered during the renovation of the Catholic church in Agoo and now housed in the Museo de Iloko, testify to this trade activity.

=== Spanish Colonial Era ===
==== 16th Century ====
A year after Miguel Lopez de Legazpi made Manila the capital of the Philippines on 24 June 1571, the Spaniards launched expeditions to Northern Luzon "to pacify the people in it".

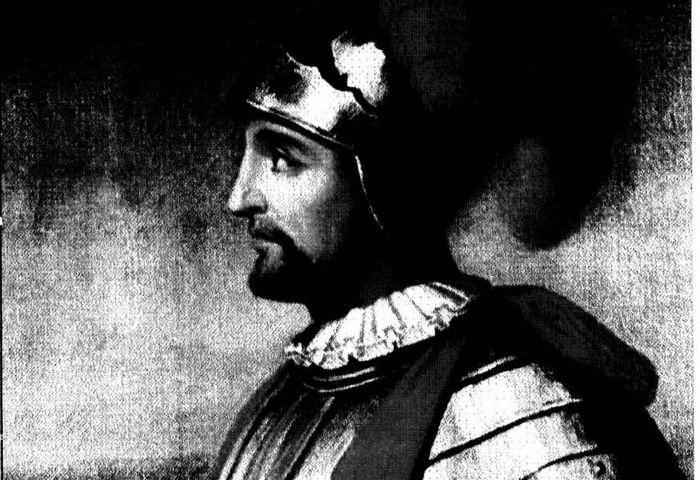
Spanish Conquistador Juan de Salcedo, who led the colonization of the Ilocos Region

In June 1572, Spanish explorers led by conquistador Juan de Salcedo, the grandson of Miguel López de Legazpi, launched an expedition northward and founded several Spanish settlements, including those in the Ilocos region and the city of Vigan.

By 1575, Salcedo navigated the Angalacan River to the Lingayen Gulf in pursuit of Limahong, a Chinese pirate who had fled to Pangasinan after his fleet was driven away from Manila in 1574. There, they encountered and attacked three Japanese ships, mistakenly identifying them as part of Limahong’s fleet.

After the ships retreated, Salcedo pursued them and arrived at a Japanese port in Agoo. The Japanese mercenaries and local natives were subjugated and required to pay tribute to the Spanish Crown. Although some initially resisted, those who complied were allowed to remain. This encounter earned Agoo the title "El Puerto de Japón" (Japanese Port) from Miguel de Loarca in 1582, as it had long served as a hub for trade among Japanese and Chinese merchants and local natives.

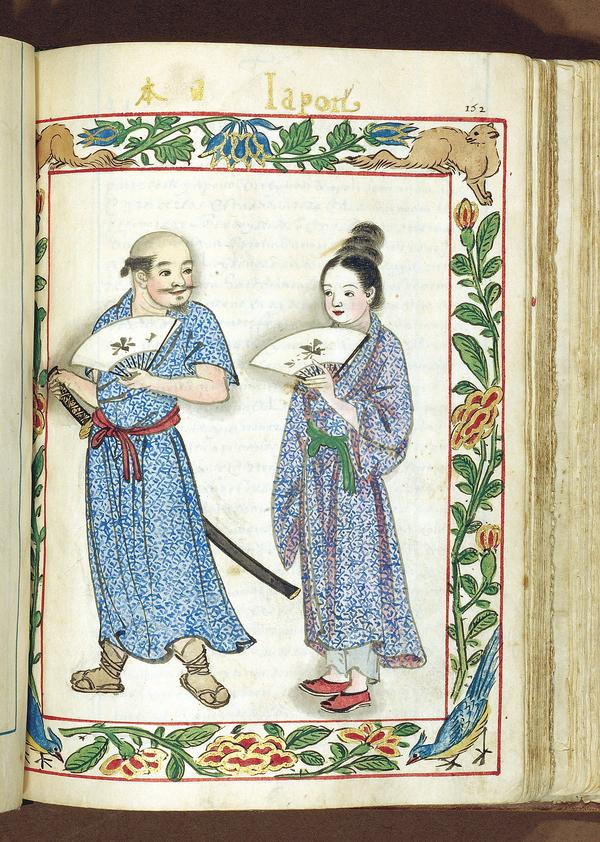
Illustration of Japanese settlers in the Philippines, circa 1590s

Salcedo continued his expedition northward and arrived at what is now San Fernando. When he demanded tribute from the natives, they sought permission to ascend the mountains to gather their offerings but failed to return. Salcedo then proceeded to Atuley (modern-day San Juan) and further north until they encountered a large Ilocano settlement called "Purao," referring to the gleaming white sands of its beaches along the South China Sea.

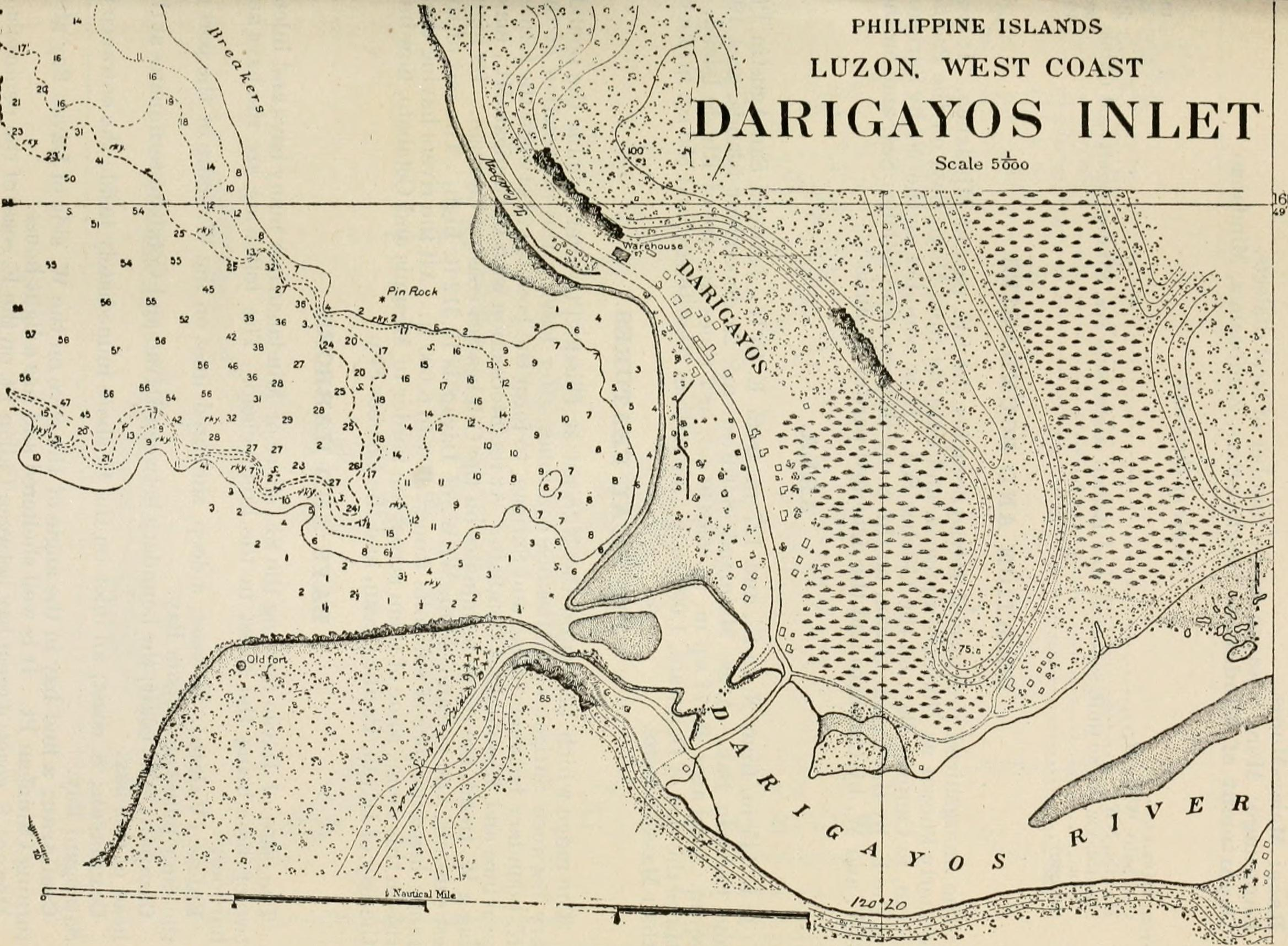
Illustration of Darigayos Inlet in Luna, circa 1902

When the natives of Purao refused to pay tribute, it led to the first recorded conflict in the Ilocos region, known as the Battle of Purao. This encounter resulted in the shedding of the first Ilocano blood in defiance of foreign rule. The river "Purao" was later renamed "Darigayos," derived from the Iloco words "dara" (blood) and "ayos" (flowed), meaning "where blood flowed." Continuing his journey, Salcedo arrived at Bigan (now Vigan), a settlement of Chinese traders, and formally established it as Villa Fernandina de Vigan in honor of Prince Ferdinand, the son of King Philip II of Spain.

==== 17th century ====
By the 17th century, the Spanish had established settlements, or pueblos, organized into sitios and rancherias, in Igorot land in La Union. These were governed by a gobernadorcillo, alcalde-mayor and cabeza de barangay, with many of these settlements established by Augustinian friars during the 16th century's expansion phase.

Society during this period was divided into two classes: the babaknang and the cailianes. The baknang or babaknang means "the rich" and agtuturay or agturay refers to "the powers-that be" or "the authorities." Propertied, landed, and educated, they formed the local elite class or were the principalia or insulares who spoke Castilian, On the other hand, the unlearned cailianes had less or no property that spoke Iloco, Pangasinan, Kankanai and Ibaloi. Iloco served as the province's lingua franca.

The Spaniards' search for gold (oro) in Igorot territories fueled their expeditions. Religious orders were also motivated by opportunities for missionary work. By 1620, however, the gold trade had begun to decline in the province including the Aringay-Balatok-Tonglo, Bauang and Bangar gold trails. Captain Garcia de Aldana led expeditions into areas like Aringay, Bauang, and San Juan, while Sargento Mayor y Capitan Alonso Martin Quirante centralized the industry in 1624, deploying a force of 1,748 troops, including Spaniards, Chinese, Japanese, Mexicans, and 500 Ilocanos. Natives and mercenaries were often faced harassments forced to reveal gold sources. Many converted to Christianity to avoid persecution, while others fled to the Cordilleras.

In 1661, Andrés Malong of Pangasinan, who declared himself king, led a rebellion against Spanish colonial rule in an attempt to liberate several areas in the northern pueblos of Pangasinan and the Ilocos provinces. As part of his campaign, Malong sought to reclaim Agoo from Spanish control. However, his forces, consisting of Pangasinenses, Zambals, and Negritos, suffered a decisive defeat during the Battle of Agoo. The Spanish, with their superior weaponry and strategic fortifications, successfully repelled the rebellion.

==== 18th century ====
In the early 1700s, Spanish missions in Agoo, Bauang, and Bacnotan aimed to convert resettled Igorots through the Spanish reducción policy, which subjected natives to harsh treatment. By 1739, friars discovered that Bangar engaged in barter trade with the Igorots in the east. Smuggling became rampant under the Tobacco Monopoly in the late 1700s, impacting Spanish revenues significantly by 1788. Despite Spanish efforts to control the highlands, the Igorots retained their autonomy well into the 19th century.

In 1754, Igorot chieftain Lacaaden of Bukiagan (now part of Tubao) negotiated with the Spaniards to avoid punitive expeditions by requesting missionaries for his people. This led to the baptism of Igorot chieftain in Tondo under Governor-General Pedro Manuel de Arandía Santisteban. However, resistance resumed in 1759, prompting Pangasinan Governor Arza to launch a military campaign. On 18 March, Lacaaden led a five-hour battle against Spanish forces armed with rifles and artillery. The Igorots held their ground, forcing the Spaniards to retreat along what is now Naguilian Highway, burning villages along the way.

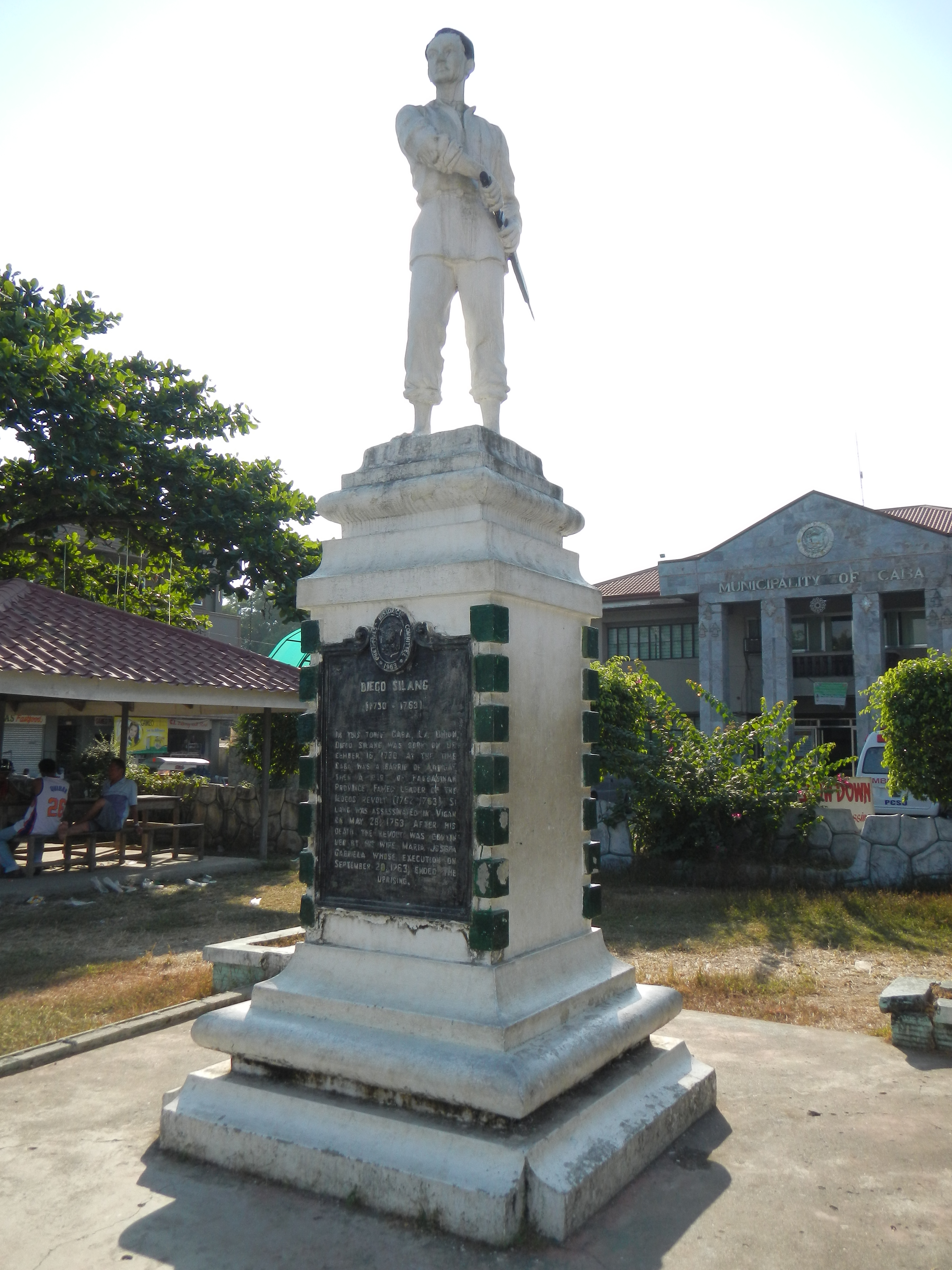
Diego Silang Monument in Caba, historically part of Aringay, Pangasinan province, his birthplace.

The town of Caba became notable as the birthplace of Diego Silang, leader of the Ilocos Revolt (1762–1765) during the British occupation of Manila. Silang persuaded the gobernadorcillo of Balaoan to encourage Ilocanos and Igorots in the town to join his anti-British struggle, which extended to the revolt in Vigan.

==== 19th century ====
On 2 February 1818, the Real Cédula divided Ilocos Province into Ilocos Norte and Ilocos Sur after the Basi Revolt in 1807. The towns of Balaoan, Bangar, and Namacpacan (Luna) were incorporated into the province of Ilocos Sur on 10 February 1819.

In 1820, Don Agustin de Valencia, a gobernadorcillo, Don Agustin Decdec, and an Igorot chieftain from Kayan, together with other Igorot leaders from Bacong and Cagubatan (present-day Mt. Province) formalized an Ilocano-Igorot bodong (peace pact) between the Ilocano lowlanders of Bangar and Tagudin. This agreement, facilitated by the Capitanes Pasados, reinstated highland-lowland trade, which had been disrupted three years earlier due to the killing of an Igorot and the subsequent retaliatory killing of an Ilocano from Bangar.

By 1826, the Spanish established the Commandancia del Pais de Ygorrotes y Partido del Norte de Pangasinan to combat tobacco smuggling. Lieutenant Colonel Guillermo Galvey led campaigns into the Cordilleras, using towns like Agoo, Bauang, Bacnotan, and San Juan as military bases.

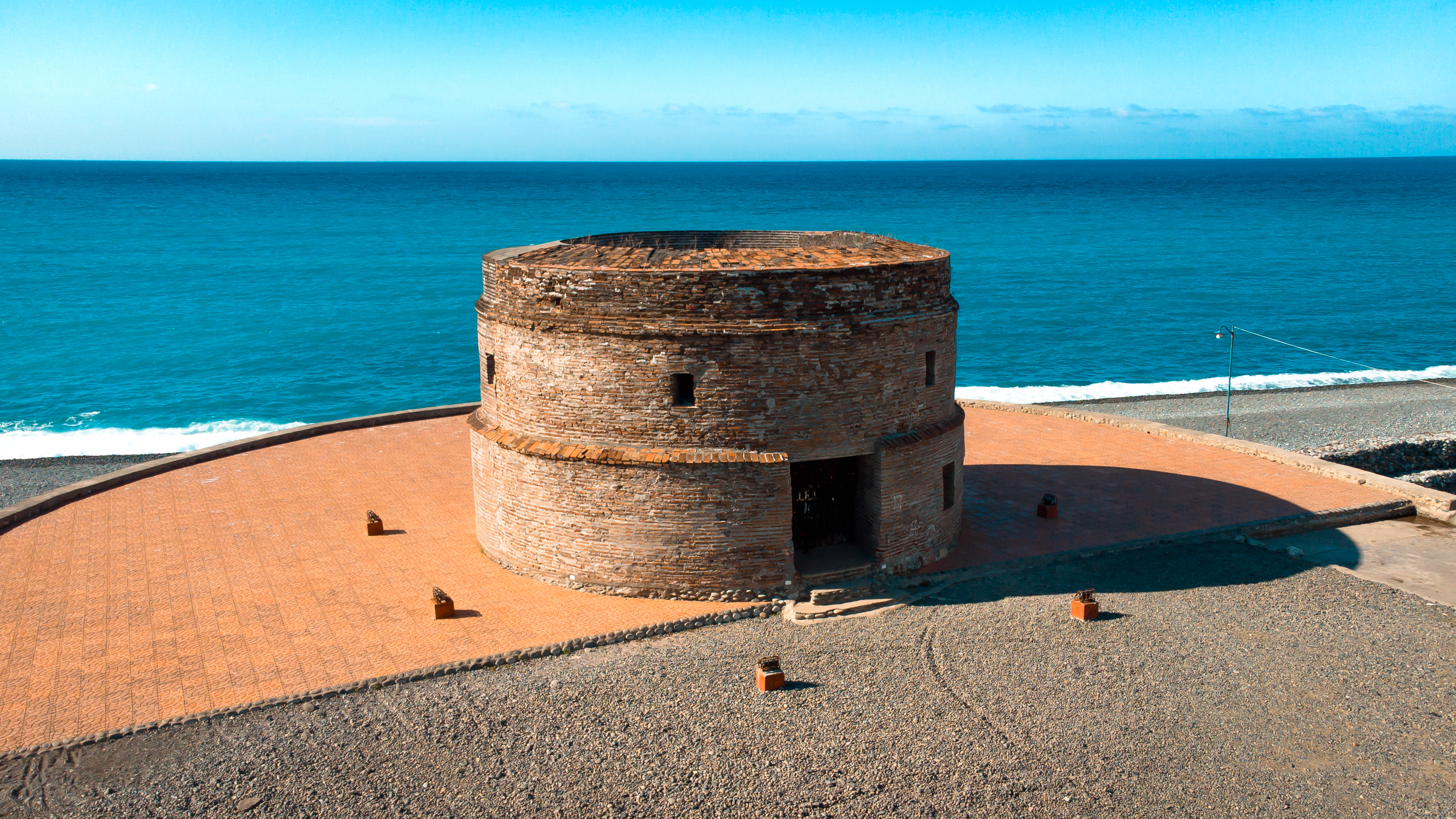
Baluarte Watch Tower, Luna

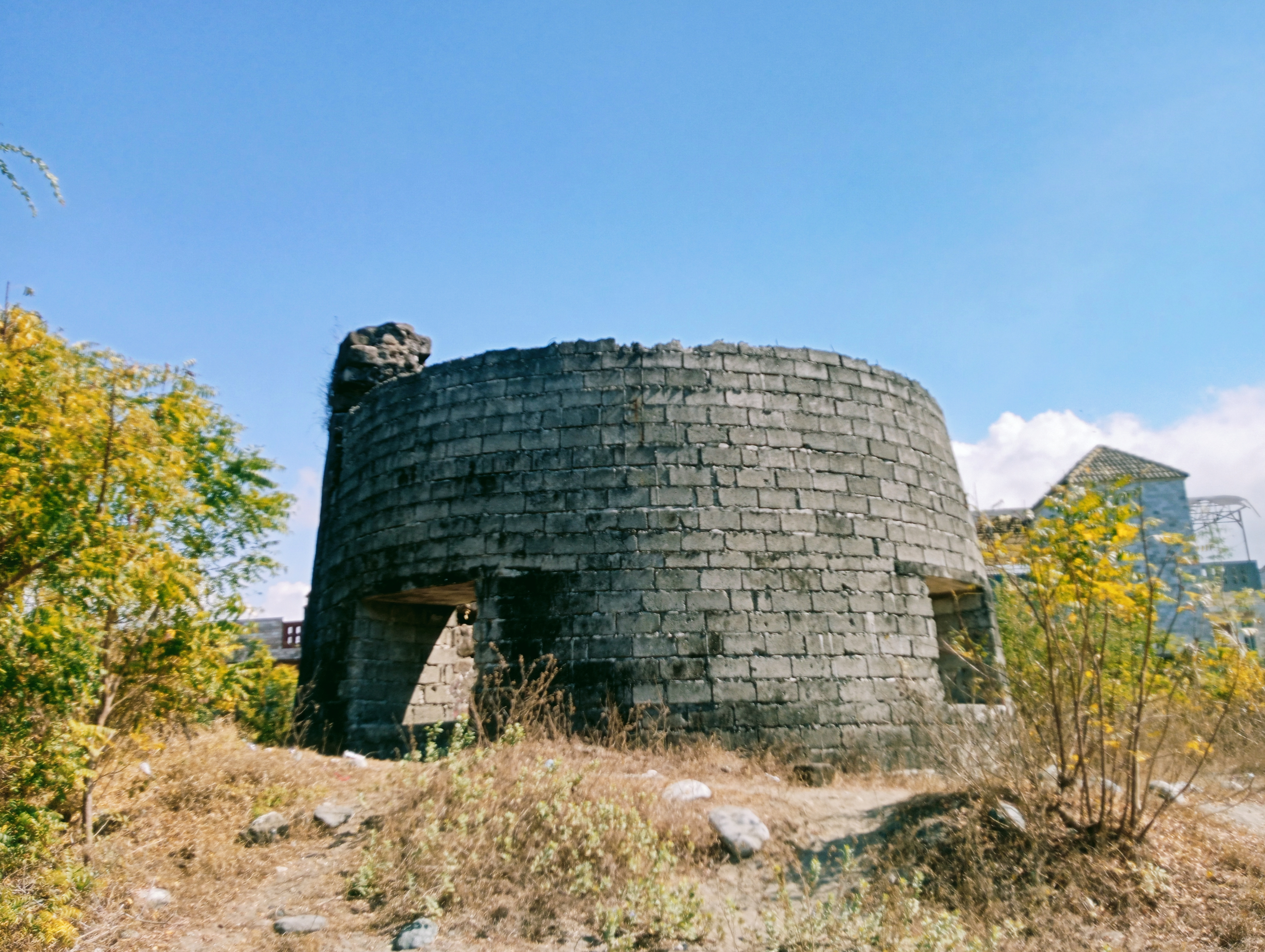
San Juan Watchtower, La Union

400-year-old Spanish-era watchtowers built to guard against tirongs (pirates) along the coastal settlements of La Union

From 18th to 19th century the coastal towns frequently faced raids by Moro marauders locally known as tirongs (raiders, attackers, pirates) and Chinese pirates, who looted barrios or villages and captured women and children. To counter these attacks, the Spaniards built circular adobe watchtowers, or baluartes, in 1836. These structures, ranging from 6 to 7 meters (20 to 23 ft) in height, were constructed along the coastline in towns such as Namacpacan (Luna), Balaoan, San Fernando, and Bauang. These baluartes played a crucial role in protecting coastal settlements and securing trade routes throughout the 19th century.

==== Formation of La Union ====
La Union was officially established on 2 March 1850, through the unification of territories from the provinces of Ilocos Sur, Pangasinan, and the Cordillera, making it the 34th province of the Philippines. After Cebu became the first provincia in 1565, new provinces have been created by the Spaniards. Three main functions were considered so: Political-Civil Administration, Ecclesiastical governance and Geographical considerations. For more than two and one-half centuries, the original Ilocos province remained intact until 1818 when it split into llocos Norte and Ilocos Sur. In 1846, Abra was created by Governor General Narciso Zaldua Claveria.

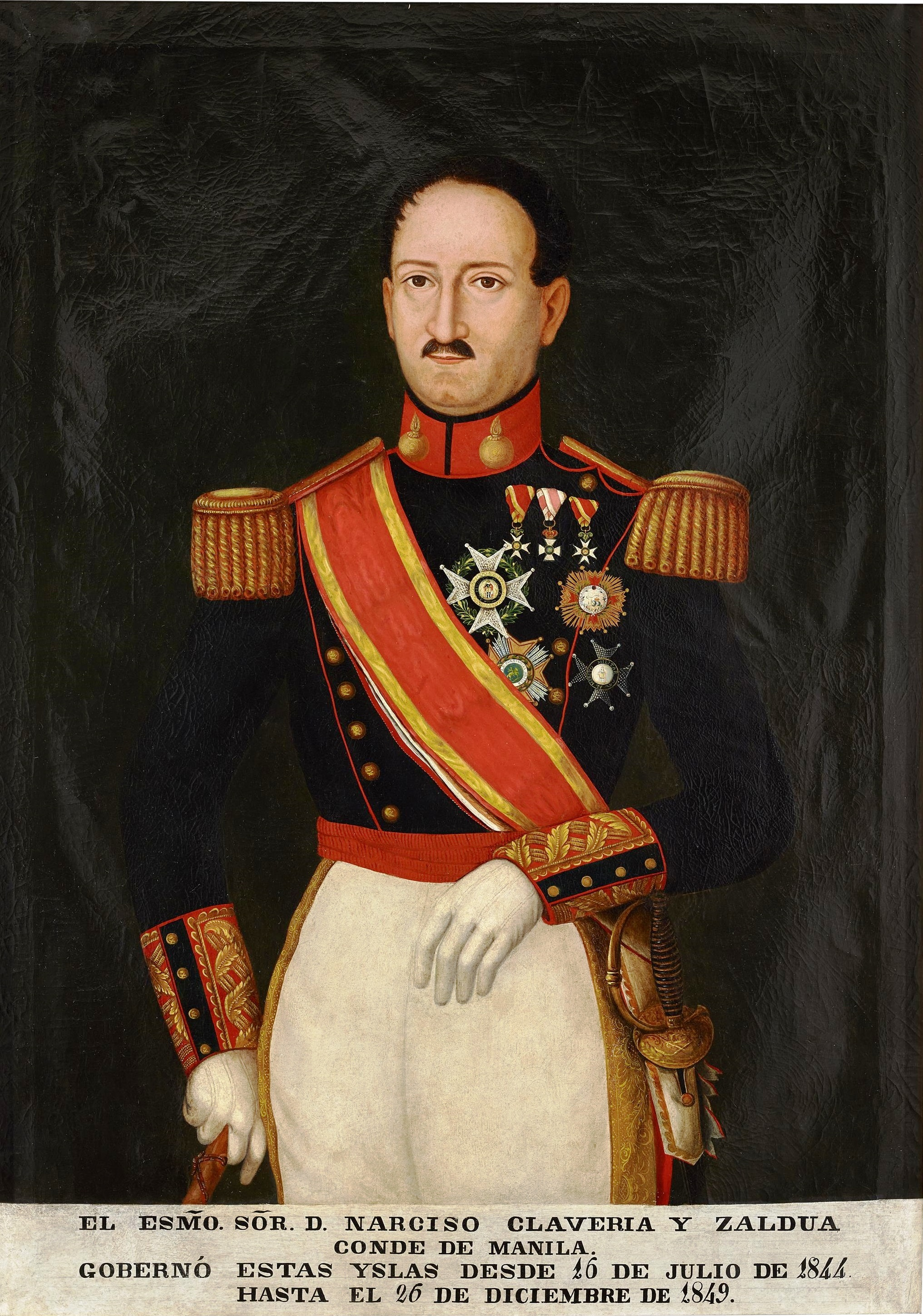
Governor-General Narciso Zaldua Claveria who proposed and created the province of La Union.

Governor General Narciso Zaldua Claveria was a visionary administrator who recognized the need for innovative solutions to address the demands of political and civil administration. He proposed combining three contiguous areas that were far from their respective provincial capitals, seeing it as a viable approach to improve governance. Claveria also recognized the agricultural and commercial potential of the territory. Moreover, he saw this initiative as an opportunity to extend Hispanic civilization and Christianity to the area.

Distance posed significant challenges to local administration. From Vigan, the capital of Ilocos Sur, the three southernmost pueblos—Balaoan, Namacpacan, and Bangar—were located approximately 13 to 14 hours away on foot. The cailianes and the babaknang often complained about the physical distance from their officials in the cabecera or capital town. Similarly, from Lingayen, the capital of Pangasinan, the nine northern pueblos (Santo Tomas, Agoo, Aringay, Cava, Bauang, Naguilian, San Fernando, San Juan, and Bacnotan) were also burdened by the 13 ½ hours of travel required from Bacnotan.

The situation was even worse for the 40 to 45 rancherías located in the depths of the Eastern País del Igorotes. The commandancia established in 1826 proved ineffective in maintaining order among the Igorrotes, whose remoteness from central authorities led to rampant smuggling of tobacco and other merchandise, thereby disrupting the region's economic stability.

Illustration of the Philippine administrative divisions, circa 1899

Thus on 29 October 1849, Governor General Claveria signed the promovido (proposal) to unite the Pangasinan-Ilocos-Cordillera areas into a new province called La Union (the official name designated by Claveria himself) as San Fernando as cabecera (capital) and Amburayan River in the north and Rabon River in the south as provincial boundaries. For 124 days, high and important Spanish colonial officers studied and deliberated on the proposition to create La Union or not.

On 2 March 1850, Governor General Antonio María Blanco signed the superior decreto that founded La Union – the 34th province since the founding of Cebu in 1565. It was classified as a Gobierno Politico-Militar (Political-Military Government). Blanco appointed, on 4 March 1850, Captain Toribio Ruiz de la Escalera (Claveria's former trusted aide de camp) as the first Gobernador Military y Politico. La Union is the union of lands, people, cultures and resources. On 18 April 1854, Queen Isabella II of Spain issued the real orden (royal decree) from Madrid confirming Blanco's superior decreto.

By 1869 and 1885 Rosario and Tubao became towns in La Union respectively. In 1869, Governor-General de la Torre converted Concepcion into Rosario, which remained spiritually dependent on Santo Tomas. Despite the bishop's refusal to assign an assistant priest, Rosario became the 13th town, with its priest overseeing both towns. In 1885, after 12 years of petitions, Tubao was officially recognized as the 14th town as San Isidro de Tubao, named after the patron saint of farmers.

By 1860, there was significant progress in commerce and agriculture in the province. La Union became an exporter and export hub of tobacco, rice, and sibucao from the 1860s to the 1880s. Tobacco was the primary product and the reason for the province's economic growth. Spanish authorities relied heavily on the prized leaf for further economic development. The industry was so lucrative that a Tobacco Monopoly was established. All tobacco leaves were strictly monitored and purchased exclusively by the government at a fixed price.

Simultaneously, other provinces were also experiencing economic growth. Relying on its own indigenous resources, La Union did not import rice, palay, tobacco, sibucao, or other products during this period.

By 1887, the province's population had grown to 100,775. La Union's heterogeneous population mingled throughout this period. The Chinos, or Mestizos de Sangley, Españoles-Peninsulares, and Españoles-Insulares coexisted with the native Pangasinenses, Ilocanos, and Igorots (particuallaly the Kankanai and Ibaloi), whether Christianized or non-Christianized. The Christianized Igorots or Nuevo Cristianos were often referred to as Vagos or Bago.

Gobernadores Politico-Militares of La Union (1850–1898)

The following is a list of Spanish Gobernadores Politico-Militares who served the province of La Union from its establishment in 1850 until the Philippine Revolution in 1898. During this period, approximately 32 individuals alternately held the titles of Gobernador Politico-Militar and Gobernador Militar-Politico. From 1890 to 1898, these officials were ranked as Gobernador Civil or Civil Gobernador by the superior gobierno, with the honorific title "Don" prefixed to their names.

Gobernadores Politico-Militares of La Union
Toribio Ruiz de la Escalera	4 March 1850 – 30 March 1854
Manuel Solis y Cuetos	31 March – 31 December 1854
Toribio Ruiz de la Escalera	1 January 1855–1857
Leopoldo Rodriguez de Rivera	4 May–September, 1857
Jose Gonzales del Campo	1 Sept. – 28 November 1957
Gumersindo Rojo	1857–1862
Eduardo Lopez	1862
Gumersindo Rojo	1862–1864
Francisco Ripoll	1864–1869
Pablo Cazes	3 January – 14 March. 1870
Manuel Ruiz	14 March-Aprll 18. 1870
Enrique Vega	18 April 1870–1872
Emilio Godinez	1872–1874
Francisco Herrera Davila	1875
Federico Rubio y Gallego	1875–1879
Ricardo Monet	1879–1880
Enrique Zappino y Moreno	1880–1883
Vicente Vlllena	1883
Ricardo Perez de Escohotado	24 January 1883–1884
Federico Francia y Parajira	13 May 1884–1887
Manuel Morlins	24 October 1887
Luis Quesada	1887
Cruz Gonzales Yragorri	23 October 1888
Manuel Diez de Tejada	1888–1889
Juan Aranaz	1889
Jose dela Guardia	8 May. 1890–1892
Francisco Rojano	21 July 1892
Antonio del Rio y Castro	1892–1893
Simon Fernandez y Cabello	1893-September 9, 1894
Jose Ma. Ossorio	1894
Antonio Diaz de Cendrera	1895–1896
Manuel Esteban y Espinosa	1897–1898

=== Philippine Revolution ===
==== Philippine-Spanish War ====
The Philippine Revolution began in 1896, but La Union initially saw limited revolutionary activity. On 15 November 1896, the newspaper La Campaña de Filipinas reported that the provinces of Ilocos and La Union were "not up in arms" but showed "sympathy for the uprising." Despite this initial passivity, the province eventually joined the struggle against Spanish colonial rule. In response, Spanish authorities enacted severe reprisals, including torture and false accusations, often targeting local elites, clergy, and suspected rebels.

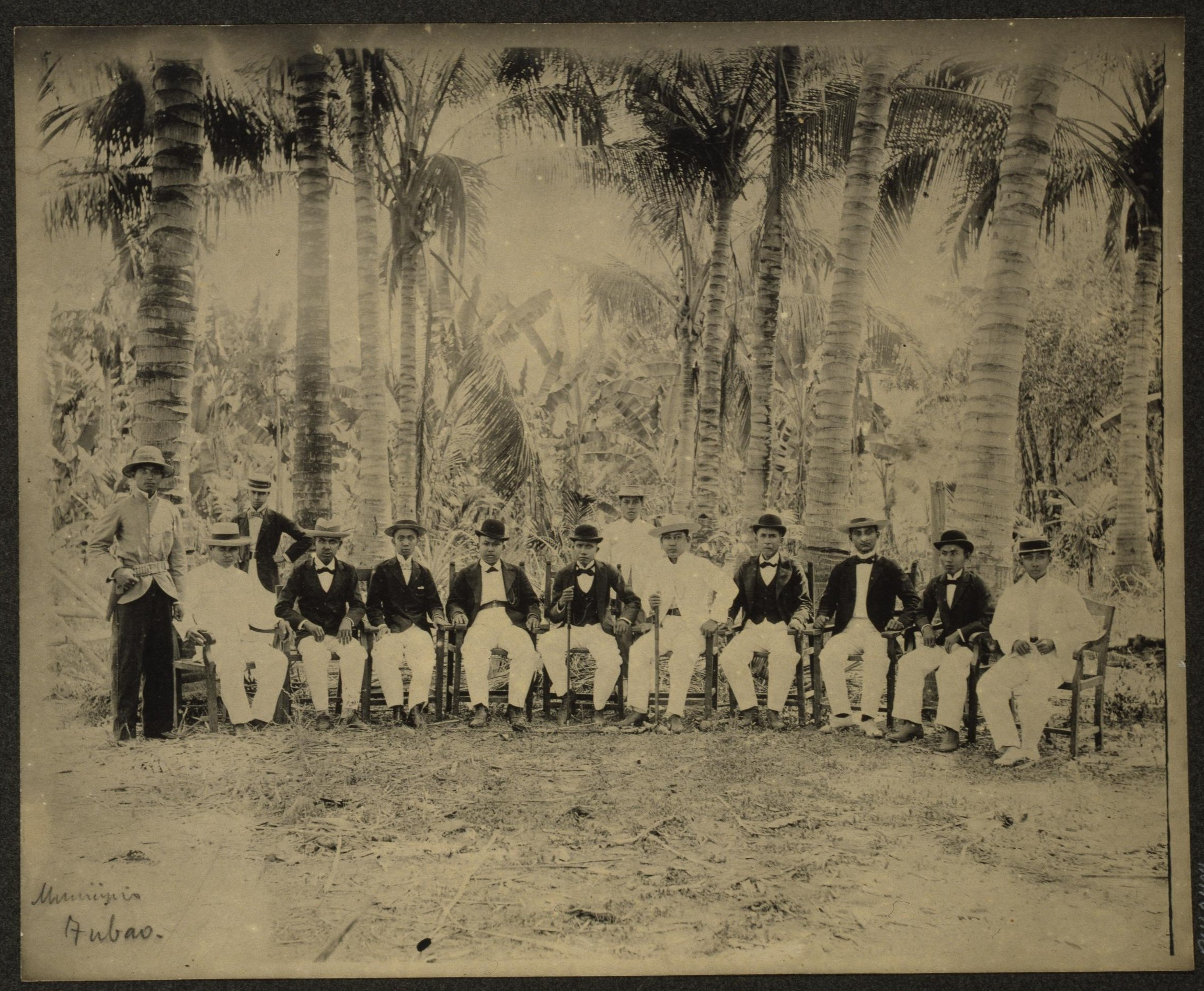
Tubao Municipal Officials circa 1896–1901

In 1896, three native coadjutor priests from La Union, Padre Adriano Garces of Balaoan, Padre Mariano Gaerlan of San Fernando, and Padre Mariano Dacanay of Bacnotan, were arrested and charged with masterminding a "supposed conspiracy" in La Union. They were brutally tortured by friars and the Guardia Civil in Vigan, enduring inhumane treatment that left lifelong scars on survivors like Padre Dacanay.

In Balaoan, a secret revolutionary group formed by seven prominent citizens namely; Luciano Resurreccion, Proceso Ostrea, Antonio Ostrea, Rufino Zambrano, Fernando Ostrea, Patricio Lopez, and Julian Peralta—sought to revolt against the tyranny of the Guardia Civil and Cora Parrocos. The group was betrayed by Captain Juan of Agoo to the friars. They were arrested, and without trial, executed by firing squad at the town cemetery. Only one of the men survived, having been wounded in the leg. In their honor, a Masonic lodge named Siete Martires was established.

In Agoo, around 60 suspected subversives were executed by the Guardia Civil and their bodies later interred in a corner of the town plaza. In nearby Aringay, 96 citizens were shot without trial by Spanish forces. A monument was later erected in the plaza to honor these patriots. On 10 September 1896, Spanish authorities, led by Friar Rafael Redondo, arrested Dr. Lucino Almeida, the highest-ranking native official in La Union, along with other suspected revolutionaries. They were accused of involvement in a fabricated conspiracy to assassinate Spanish officials, based on a false confession from a telegrapher. Almeida and 20 other prominent natives were exiled to Balabac Island, Palawan.

Despite these events, La Union was hailed as "una provincia modelo" (a model province) in 1897 by the pro-government El Comercio for its contributions to Spain's defense. However, in 1898, the relative tranquility of La Union was shattered when an uprising and massacre in Santo Tomas ignited widespread agitation.

Uprising of 1898

The revolution in La Union began on 22 May 1898, with a small uprising in Santo Tomas. A shot from a small revolver (“una revolver pequeña”) was heard, igniting the “seditious movement of Union.” A single shot from this revolver ended the life of the much-hated Augustinian friar, Mariano Garcia, marking the end of Spanish rule in the province. The enraged revolutionaries stormed the convent, seized the priest, chained him, and beheaded him, his head rolled to the ground like a soccer ball. This act sparked a series of mass massacres (“hecatombes”) throughout the province.

The subsequent violence led to the massacre of various individuals, including Garcia's visitors and others. Women also became victims of brutal acts, with one storekeeper in San Fernando left mentally deranged. In San Juan, pro-Spanish inhabitants were massacred, while in Caba, pro-Spanish sympathizers were captured and held incommunicado in the mountains. In Bauang, revolutionaries clashed with Spanish soldiers and seized the town hall, led by Captain Remigio Patacsil.

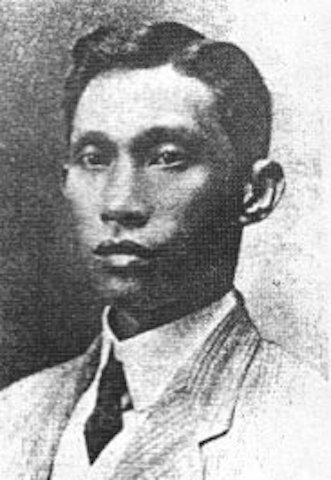
Gen. Manuel Tinio, the leader who led the Philippine revolution in La Union

From May to August 1898, citizens of La Union fought several heroic battles against the Spanish forces in key towns such as Darigayos (Luna), Bacnotan, Rabon (Rosario), San Fernando, Bangar, and Balaoan. Despite heavy losses and diminishing supplies, Spanish forces under Lieutenant Colonel Jose Herreros mounted a five-day defense in Casa Real. However, they were eventually overwhelmed by revolutionaries in towns like Bangar, Bacnotan, and Balaoan, and the Spaniards were forced to surrender. The final stand in Balaoan saw Spanish forces barricaded in the convent, but despite their valiant defense, they were outmaneuvered, and many escaped to Ilocos Sur.

On 22 July, Novo-Ecijano troops, reinforced to over 600 men, arrived in San Fernando after Dagupan surrendered to General Francisco Makabulos. The town was under siege by revolutionaries led by General Mauro Ortiz. Spanish forces, commanded by Lieutenant Colonel Jose Garcia Herrero, fortified themselves in key buildings, awaiting reinforcements. The ensuing battle lasted for 120 hours, with the Spanish troops enduring extreme conditions. Major Ceballos, who had surrendered in Dagupan, attempted to negotiate the surrender of Spanish forces in San Fernando, ultimately convincing Herreros to capitulate. The proud Spaniards with the Cuerpos de Voluntaries (Corps of Volunteers) did not simply put up the white flag. This led to the signing of the Actas de Capitulaciones (Acts of Surrender), and San Fernando became the 13th of 29 towns to witness Spanish surrender, with 400 soldiers and eight officers capitulating.

After securing San Fernando, the Tinio Brigade and other revolutionaries continued north from 31 July – 18 August 1898. Key battlegrounds included the rice fields of San Juan, Bacnotan, Namacpacan, Balaoan, and Bangar. Many local Katipuneros joined the Tinio Brigade after this ordeal, which saw stubborn resistance from entrenched Spanish troops in the convent.

Final Victory

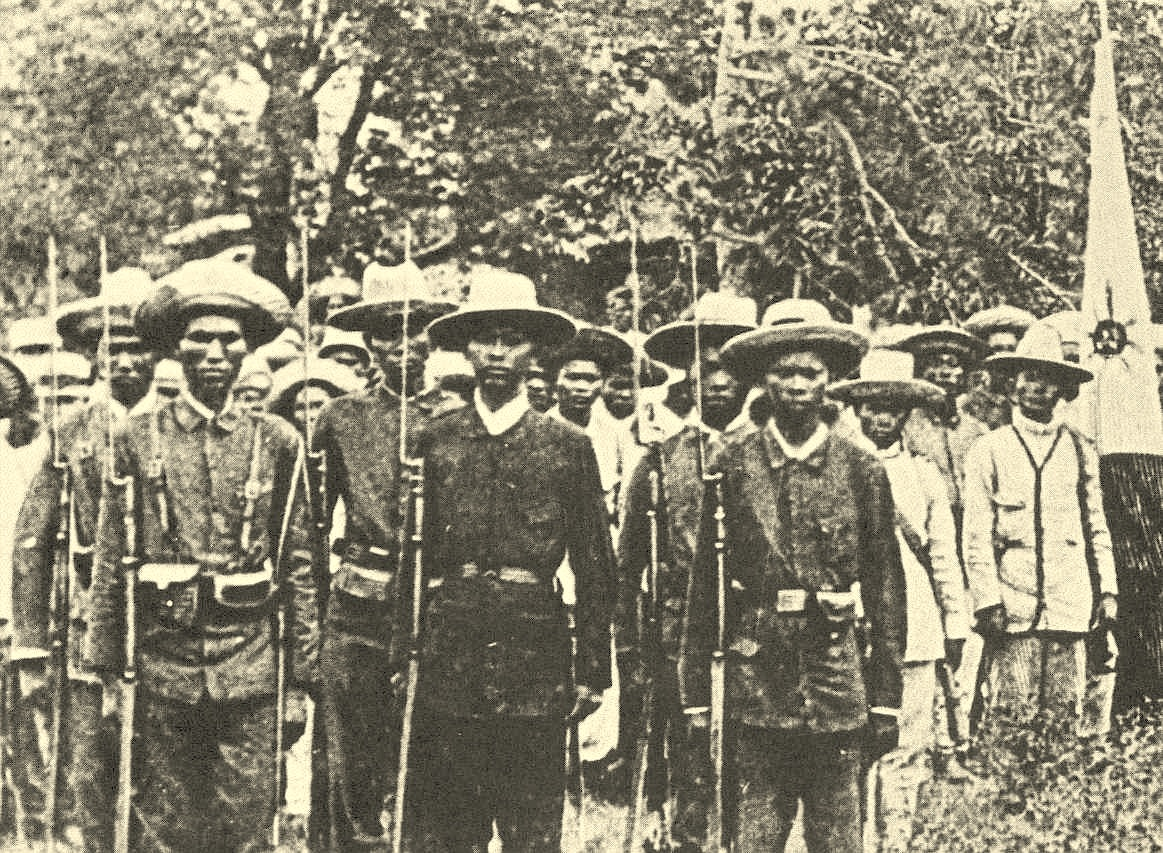
Katipuneros c.1890s

In the Amburayan Valley, Spanish forces built defensive trenches and placed bamboo traps. However, the revolutionaries, buoyed by previous victories, attacked with renewed vigor. In San Juan, they burned municipal buildings and the homes of Spanish insulares, resulting in a massacre of over 100 families attempting to flee. In Agoo, pro-Spanish sympathizers were captured and executed in the mountains.

As Spanish forces retreated, they reinforced their positions in Balaoan and Bangar, but revolutionaries quickly fortified their own defenses. Any potential reinforcements from neighboring provinces were blocked. In Darigayos Cove, Filipino rebels burned all anchored boats, preventing escape by sea. The revolutionaries then moved to Bangar, successfully besieging the Spanish forces, resulting in a decisive victory on 7 August 1898. The surrender of 87 Spaniards marked a significant milestone, with the remaining forces fleeing to Ilocos after just four days of fighting, which saw minimal Filipino casualties.

By 18 August 1898, La Union had achieved final victory, marking the definitive collapse of Spanish resistance in the province. This victory brought the revolutionaries closer to their ultimate goal of freedom from Spanish colonial rule.

==== Philippine-American War ====
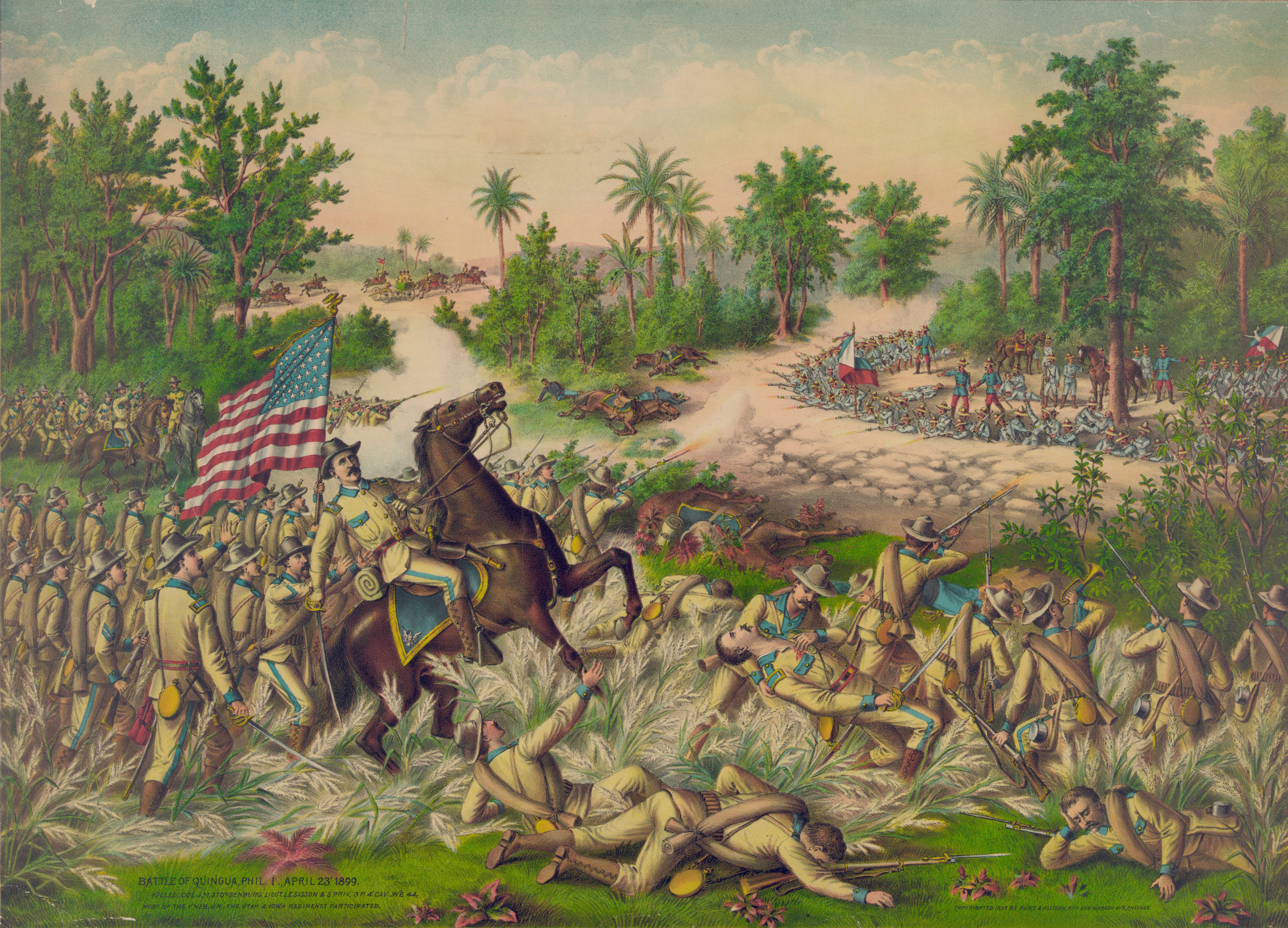
A battle of the Philippine–American War

The Philippine–American War in La Union began on the night of 4–5 February 1899, marked by the ringing of church bells across the province. By April 1899, Filipino guerrillas, under the command of General Manuel Tinio, had prepared for combat, constructing trenches throughout the province. Tinio's forces numbered 1,904, including 68 officers, 200 bolo men "hermano", 284 auxiliaries such as armorers, telegraphers, medical corpsmen, cavalry, artillerymen, and two Spanish engineers stationed in Northern Luzon.

On 16 November 1899, President Emilio Aguinaldo arrived in La Union via the Tubao trail, making his way to Aringay, where he was welcomed by the townspeople (cailianes) and elites (babaknang). From Aringay, Aguinaldo continued his journey through Cava, Bauang, and Naguilian where they spent the night in convent.

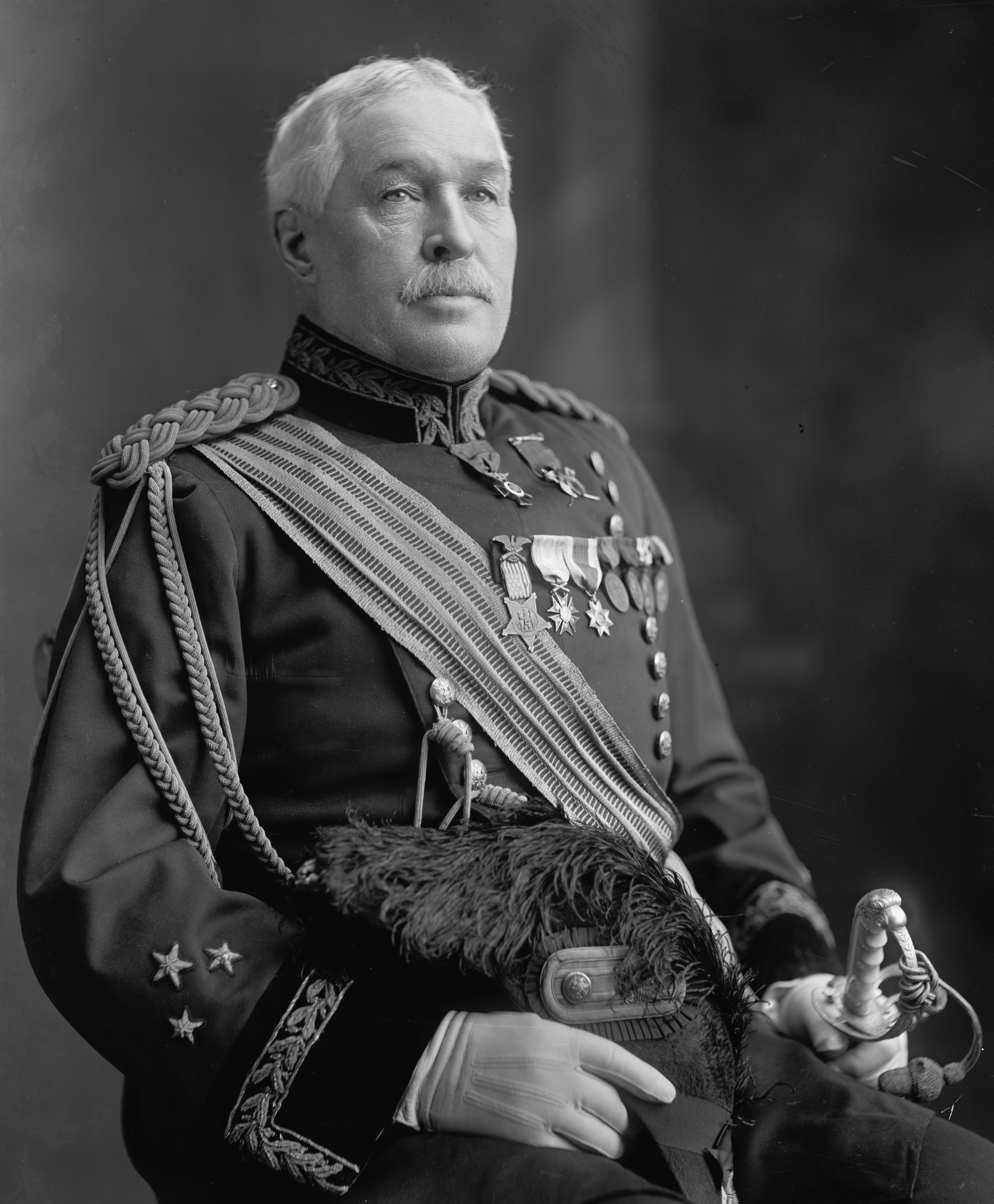
Gen. Samuel B.M. Young, Commanded Brigades in the Northern Luzon District.

On 18 November 1899, American forces under General Samuel Baldwin Marks Young entered La Union, landing in Rosario via Rabon Point along the coast in pursuit of Aguinaldo. At dusk, American forces engaged 130 Filipino revolutionaries at Tubao, commanded by Captain Santiago Fontanilla, who led a force of four officers and 87 rifles. The Americans then moved toward Aringay, where Major Matthew Arlington Batson led an attack on the town the following morning. He was wounded in a skirmish with Guerrilla Unit No. 5, an event known as the Battle of Aringay River.

Throughout the week, heavy fighting ensued between American forces and five Filipino guerrilla units in La Union led by Colonel Juan M. Gutierrez:

- Guerrilla Unit 1: Operated in Bangar, Namacpacan (Luna), and Sudipen under Captain Anacleto Mendoza.
- Guerrilla Unit 2: Operated in Balaoan, Bacnotan, and Santol (rancheria of Balaoan) under Captain Aniceto Angeles.
- Guerrilla Unit 3: Operated in San Juan, San Fernando, San Gabriel, and Bagulin under Captain Furtunato Gaerlan.
- Guerrilla Unit 4: Operated in Bauang, Caba, Naguilian, and Galiano (now Burgos) under Captain Rivera.
- Guerrilla Unit 5: Operated in Aringay, Tubao, Agoo, and Santo Tomas under Captain Santiago Fontanilla.

Simultaneous battles were fought across various towns, including Santo Tomas, Aringay, Naguilian, Bauang, and San Fernando. By 19 November, the Americans had taken Santo Tomas and Agoo. On 20 November, General Young entered San Fernando where describe the town as “series of the most formidable entrenchments,” capturing the revolutionary headquarters and estimating the presence of 1,000 Filipino insurgents. Several revolutionaries were captured.

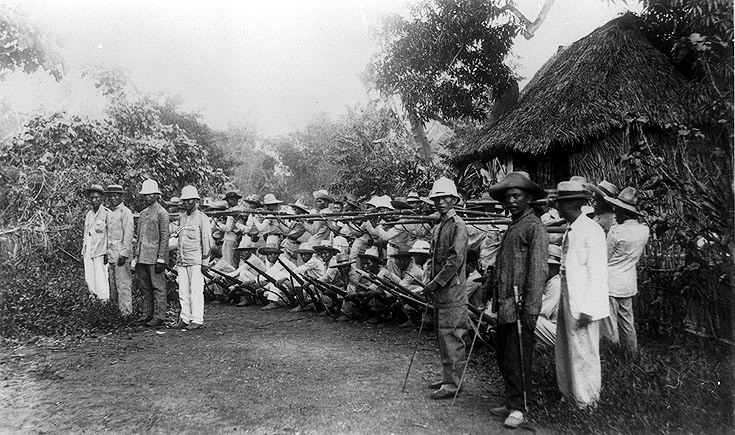
Filipino Revolutionist, circa 1899

Meanwhile, Aguinaldo continued his escape, traveling through the mountain roads of San Fernando, San Juan, and Bacnotan, narrowly evading capture. Upon reaching Balaoan, he learned of a plot to avenge General Antonio Luna, who had been killed five days earlier. This plot, intended to unfold in Luna's mother’s hometown of Namacpacan (now Luna), was thwarted by Doña Laureana Luna y Novicio.

On 21 November, Aguinaldo arrived in Bangar, escorted by General Tinio, before continuing his journey to Ilocos Sur. On the same day, La Union's insurrecto governor, Dr. Don Lucino Almeida y Almendrada, paid a courtesy call to General Young, offering assistance to the U.S. government. By 23 November, Young reaches Namacpacan (now Luna).

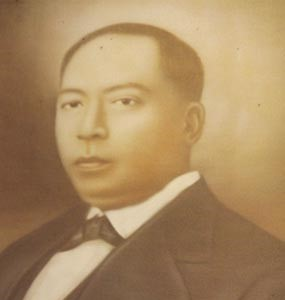
Insurrecto La Union Governor Don Lucino Almeida, who served in 1899-1901.

While seemingly cooperating with U.S. forces, Almeida secretly supported the Filipino guerrillas by establishing a network with town leaders and chieftains. He mobilized resources such as money, rice, and provisions for the guerrillas, and his haciendas in San Juan, Balaoan, and Bacnotan served as covert guerrilla hideouts.

From January to February 1900, the Tinio Brigade engaged in several battles against American forces in La Union, achieving notable victories despite being outnumbered. In January, they repelled American forces at Malabita, San Fernando and ambushed a 40-man patrol near Bangar.

In February, they conducted additional ambushes at Sabang, Bacnotan, Panicsican, San Juan, and Kagunan in Balaoan. On 26 February, they successfully retaliated against an ambush between San Juan and Bacnotan, killing several American troops, including a captain-doctor, and capturing supplies.

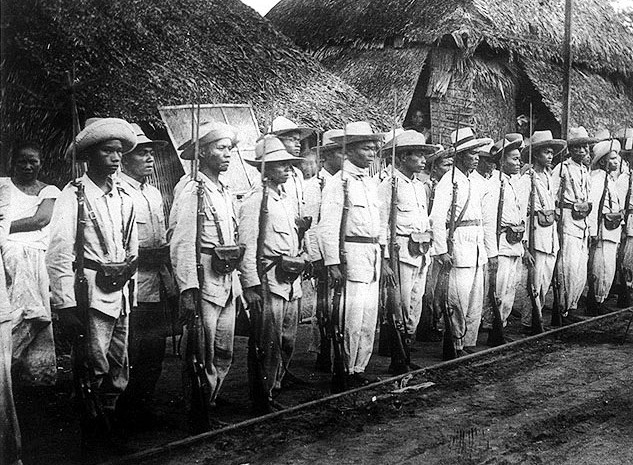
Filipino revolutionary soldiers c. 1899

By April 1900, Colonel William Penn Duvall, the U.S. military governor of San Fernando, grew suspicious of Almeida's activities. First Lieutenant William Thomas Johnston was assigned to investigate Almeida's involvement in the resistance. After months of scrutiny, Almeida was court-martialed on 3 June 1900, and exiled to Guam in January 1901.

Following Almeida's conviction, local leaders in San Fernando, Bacnotan, San Juan, Tubao, Agoo, and Rosario ceased supporting the guerrillas. Many of Almeida's former supporters switched allegiances to save themselves, earning the nickname chameleons or "balimbings." Johnston's anti-guerrilla efforts, aided by local spies, contributed to the overall pacification campaign. One of them, Crispulo Patajo native from Bauang, served as a spy, scout and leader for the U.S. forces to suppress guerrilla resistance in the province.

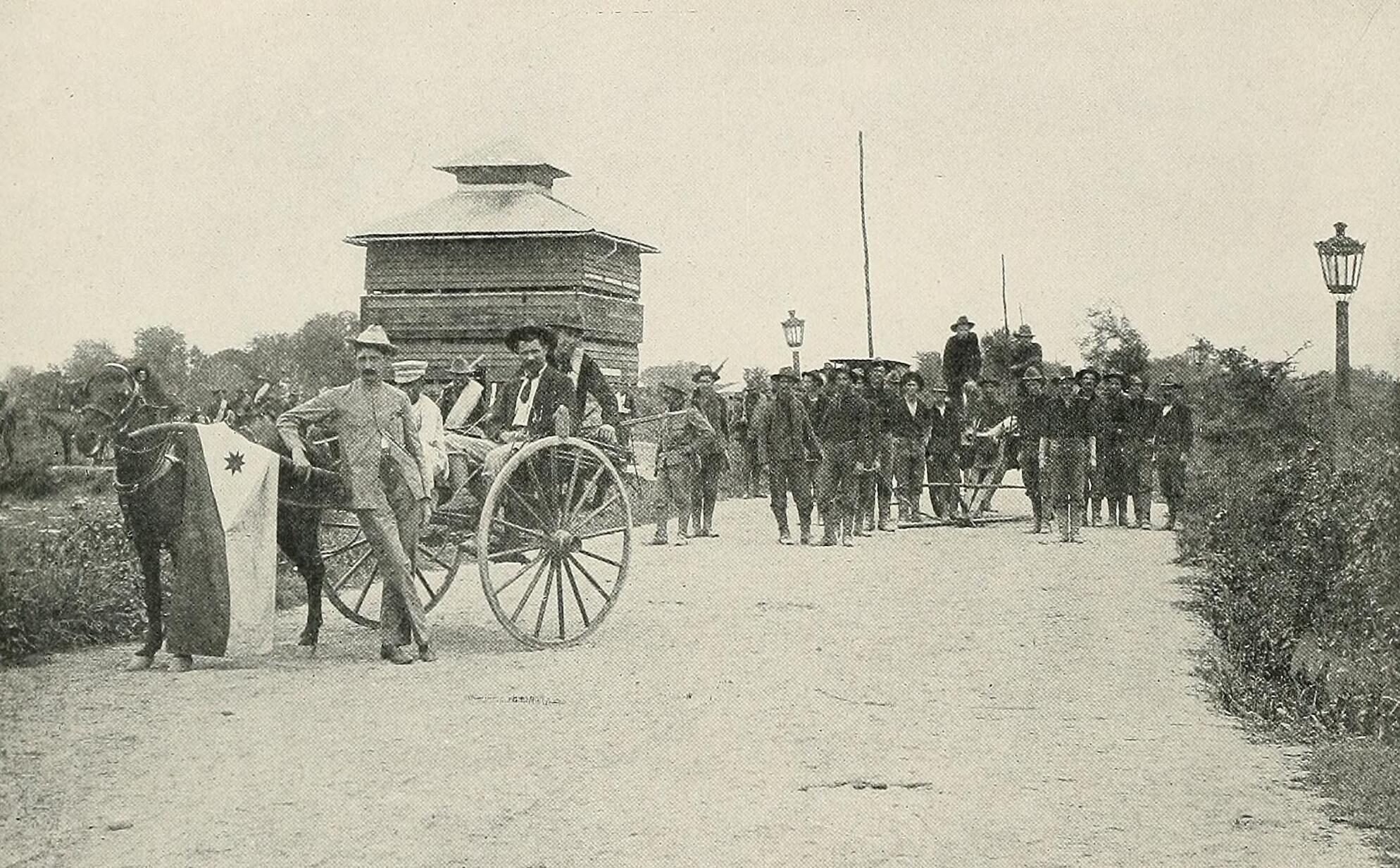
American troops in the Philippines, c. 1899

On 17 April 1900, Patajo's forces attacked and pacified the guerrilla presence in Barrio Castro, Bangar, capturing weapons and forcing insurgents to retreat. From May to June 1900, Crispulo Patajo led successful anti-guerrilla operations throughout La Union. He attacked Fontanilla's band in the Pagalan Mountains on 26 May, killing 10 insurgents and capturing 13 rifles. His forces continued to clear towns like Naguilian, Bauang, and Aringay, killing or capturing guerrillas.

In San Fernando, Patajo pacified the town in one week, capturing officers and securing rifles. He also targeted northern towns like San Juan and Bacnotan, eliminating a guerrilla company and capturing 80 rifles. Despite these successes, Colonels Juan Gutierrez and Joaquin Luna managed to escape and relocated their camp further north.

Between March and April 1901, guerrilla forces led by Aniceto Angeles, Sixto Hipolito, and Santiago Fontanilla engaged in skirmishes with American troops in various areas, including Sitio Guilong (Balaoan), Sitio Kalumboyan (Balaoan), Sitio Nabual (Bacnotan), and Barrio Castro (Bangar) that leads Major Aniceto Angeles withdraws. While they achieved some victories, their effectiveness diminished due to internal divisions, lack of discipline, and the failure to maintain unity.

By 1 May 1901, the Tinio Brigade surrendered to the Americans in Sinait, Ilocos Sur, marking the end of the Philippine-American War in La Union and the surrounding region.

=== American Colonial Era ===
After the Philippine-American War, La Union, like much of the country, faced widespread chaos. La Union revolutionary leaders such as Capt. Aniceto Angeles, Francisco Peralta, and Col. Juan M. Gutierrez were executed through public hanging and firing squad in Bangar and San Fernando town plaza, underscoring the conflict’s harsh aftermath.

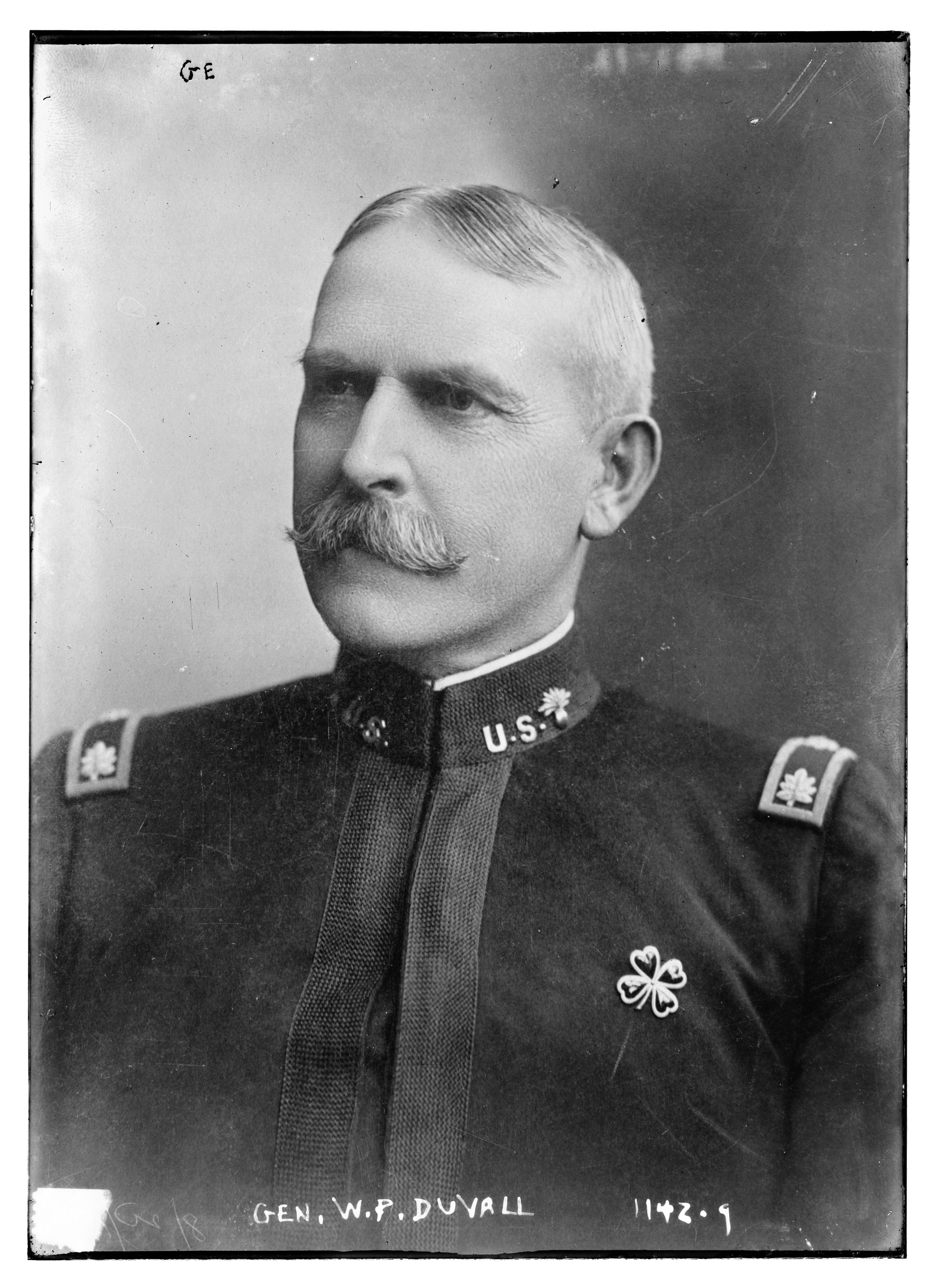
Colonel William P. Duvall of the 48th U.S. Volunteer Infantry

From 1899 to 1901, La Union was under military rule, with Colonel William Penn Duvall administering both the province and Benguet beginning on 18 March 1900. During this time, both the elites (babakanang) and townspeople (cailianes) endured forced relocations, extrajudicial killings, sexual assaults and significant property damage. This period of military governance, however, was short-lived.

In 1901, La Union transitioned to civilian governance, signaling the start of a more organized and democratic system inspired by American models. The transition marked a shift from the "spiritualism" enforced by the Catholic friars under Spanish rule to a secular system.

Despite this shift, U.S. military leaders, including Colonel Duvall, resisted relinquishing power and frequently clashed with the Philippine Commission, led by Civil Governor William Howard Taft. The conflict escalated to U.S. Secretary of War Elihu Root, who intervened to ensure La Union’s formal adoption of civilian governance on 15 August 1901.

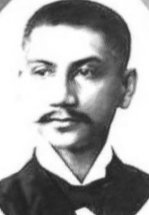
Joaquin J. Ortega, the first La Union Civil Governor, who served in 1901-1904

Don Joaquin Vicente Eulogio J. Ortega became La Union's first civilian governor, ushering in a new era of governance. However, key positions, such as the provincial treasurer, remained under American control. The colonial administration also prioritized education, suffrage, civil rights, and political participation, thus empowering Filipinos to engage in the democratic process.

Introducing the Thomasites—American teachers tasked with promoting "Americanization." English became the primary medium of instruction, aiming to instill American ideals. A notable example of this initiative’s success is Camilo Osias, a student from Balaoan, who pursued studies in the U.S. and later emerged as a respected educator and public servant.

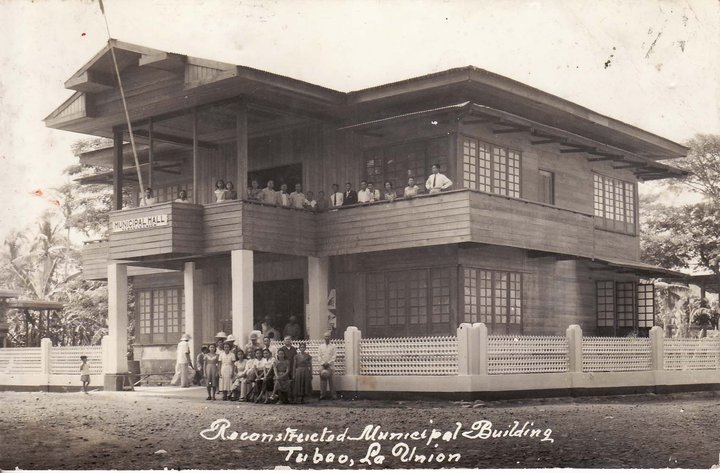
Tubao Municipal Building, c. 1940s

By 1902, La Union's education system had grown to include 89 schools spread across various pueblos (towns). A total of 8,917 pupils were enrolled—5,652 boys and 3,265 girls—constituting 15% of the province's population. Schools were established in key towns like San Fernando, Bangar, Rosario, Aringay, Cava, Agoo, Balaoan and Namacpacan (Luna), with some operating in repurposed Spanish-era convents.

In 1902, public health boards were established to address health crises such as cholera outbreaks. Measures taken during the 1902 epidemic proved effective in curbing a severe outbreak in 1908–1909. Governor Sixto Lachica Zandueta championed the establishment of a resident health officer for La Union, leading to the creation of a sub-health district by 1910. Public health continued to improve under Governor General Francis Burton Harrison (1913–1921), with coordinated efforts significantly reducing cholera cases by 1914.

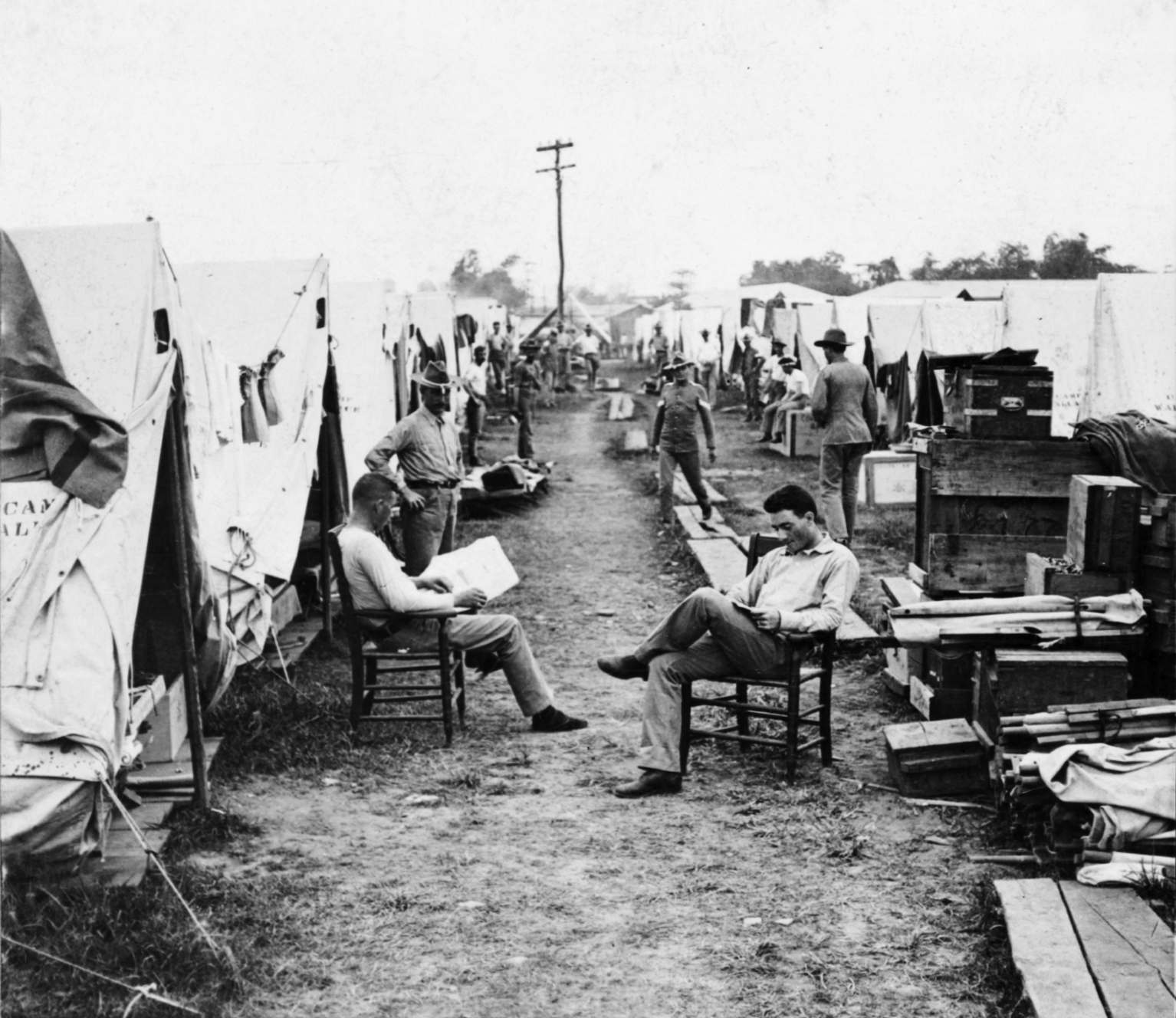
22nd U.S. Infantry at Camp Wallace, circa 1902

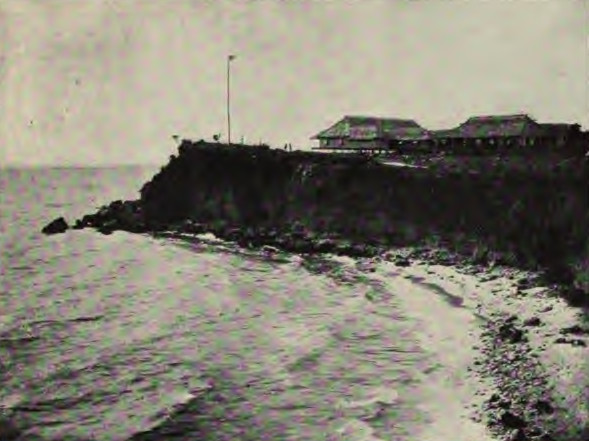
American Military Post, Camp Wallace, circa 1904.

In 1902, Camp Wallace was established on Poro Islet, San Fernando, under Captain Frank Tompkins, as it was considered a strategic location. The U.S. formally acquired it as a military reservation on 1 September 1903, and the War Department set guidelines for its creation on 13 October 1903. Governor Joaquin Ortega supported the establishment of a permanent military post in San Fernando, endorsing a petition signed by 2,637 citizens on 9 August 1902.

The integration of non-Christian tribes from the Cordilleras, referred to as the “taga-Montañosa,” became another priority. In 1902, Governor Taft proposed incorporating these groups into the municipal code or merging them with Benguet. By 1905, tensions between Bangar’s lowlanders and mountain communities led to court interventions. In 1906, Igorot settlements were transferred to sub-provinces of Benguet and Amburayan under Lepanto-Bontoc province to resolve jurisdictional and tax-related disputes. By 1911, many non-Christians sought permission to resettle in lowland areas.

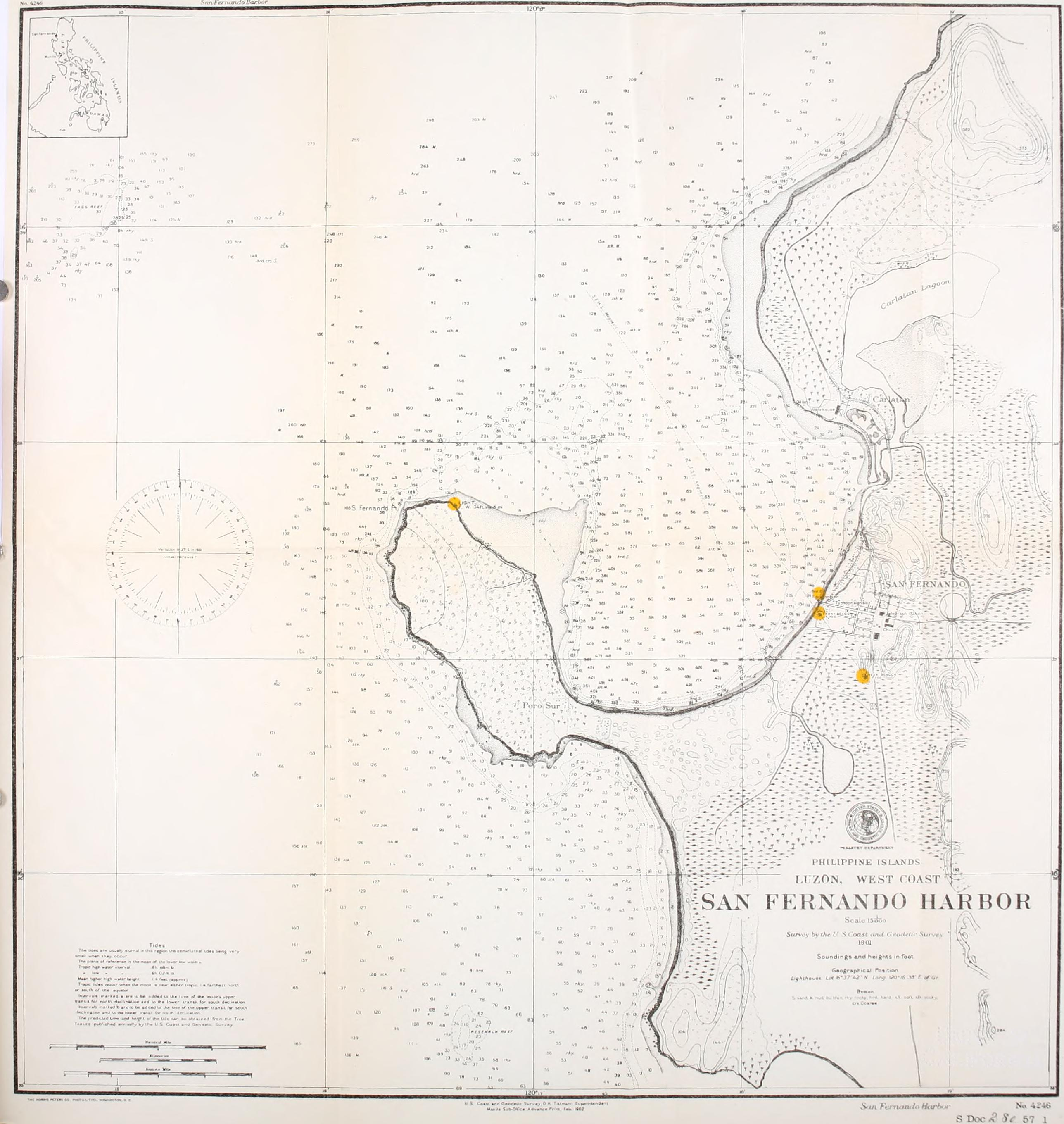
Gazetteer of San Fernando Harbor Map, circa 1901

By 1912, Christianized Igorot "Bago" communities in Rosario, Tubao, San Fernando, San Juan, and Bacnotan were fully integrated. Boundary adjustments and the conversion of mountain settlements into townships followed, with Pugo officially becoming a township on 11 December 1911. Despite proposals for a new province, the municipal districts of Sudipen, San Gabriel, Santol, Pugo, Bagulin, and Burgos remained part of La Union. These districts served as models of harmonious Christian-Igorot relations during the colonial period. By 1920, San Gabriel, Pugo, Sudipen, and Santol became official towns under Section 2 of Act No. 2877, or the Revised Administrative Code of the Philippine Islands; Bagulin followed in 1922, and Burgos in 1925, under Executive Order No. 54.

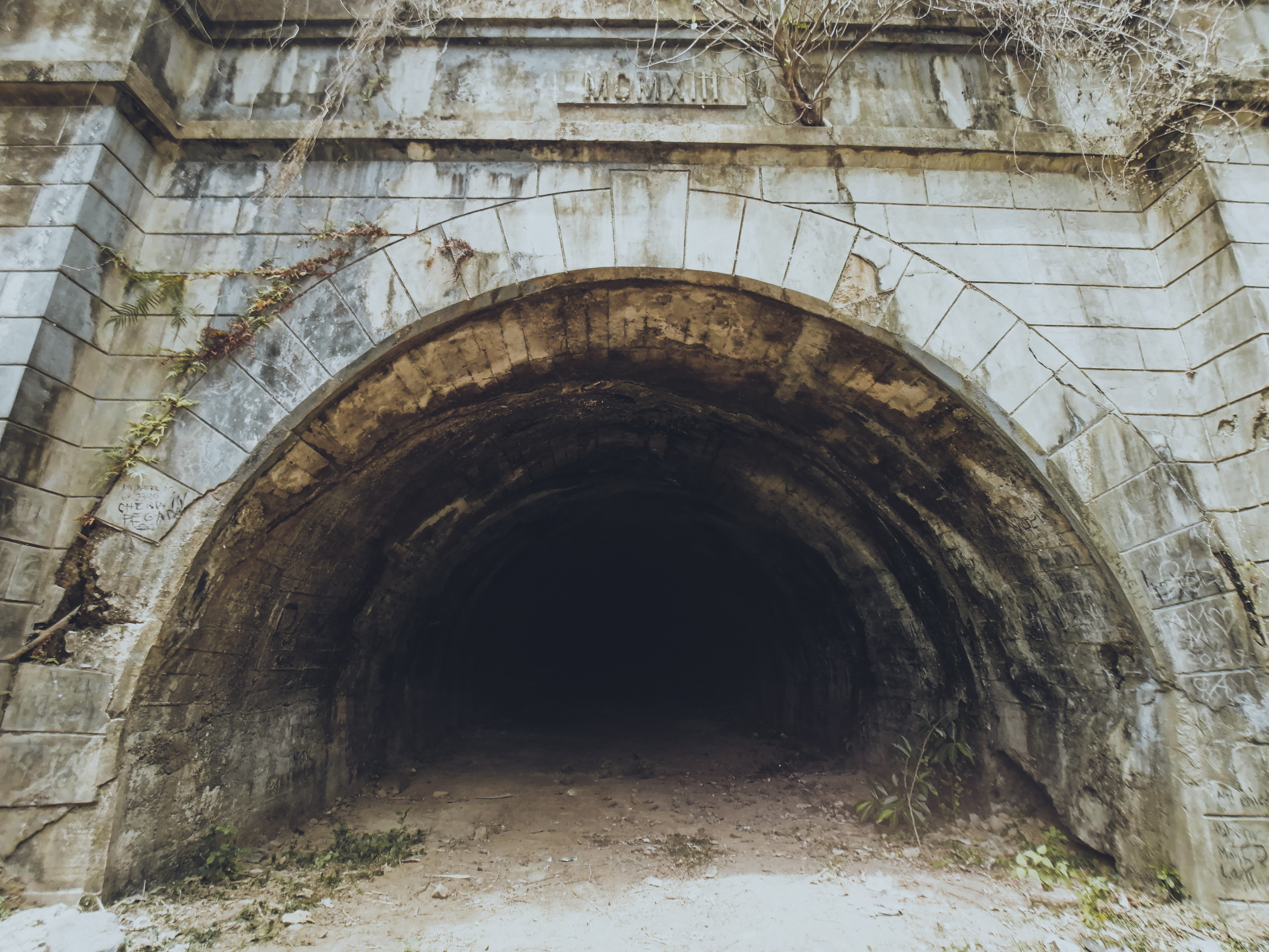
Aringay Centennial Tunnel, built in 1913, was intended to connect Benguet

Under Governor General William Cameron Forbes (1909–1913), infrastructure development flourished in La Union. Roads, airports, ports and railways (Ferrocarril de Manila-Dagupan) were expanded, with the rail line reaching Aringay in 1910 and Bauang in 1918. This enhanced connectivity significantly boosted the local economy, particularly in southern La Union, by linking it to Dagupan. Major projects included the construction of the Taboc Bridge on the San Juan-Bacnotan Road, the Bauang-Naguilian Road, the Bacnotan-Balaoan Wagon Road, the San Fernando Wharf, and the Amburayan River irrigation system, which supported tobacco and rice fields, bolstering agriculture and trade.

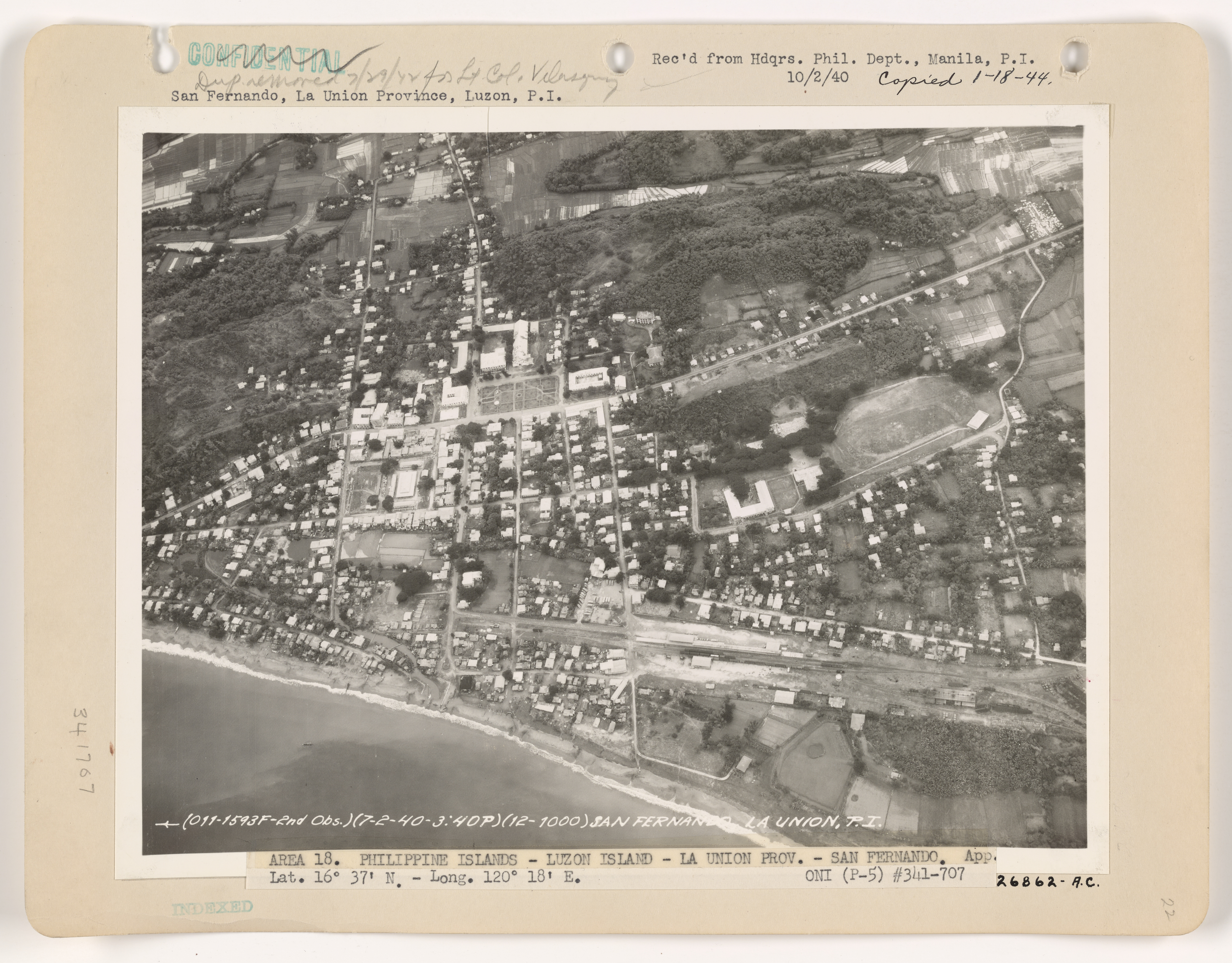
San Fernando

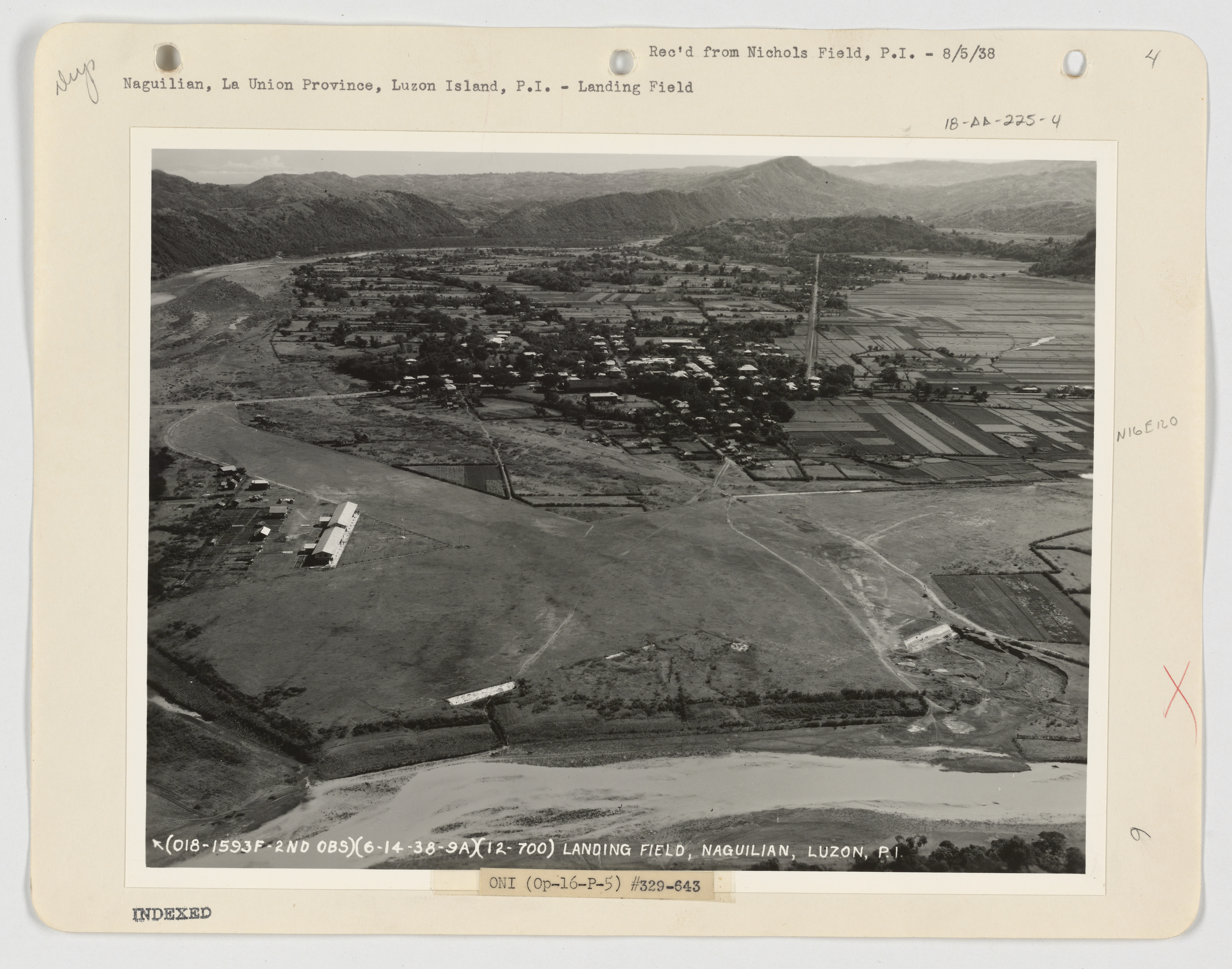
Naguilian

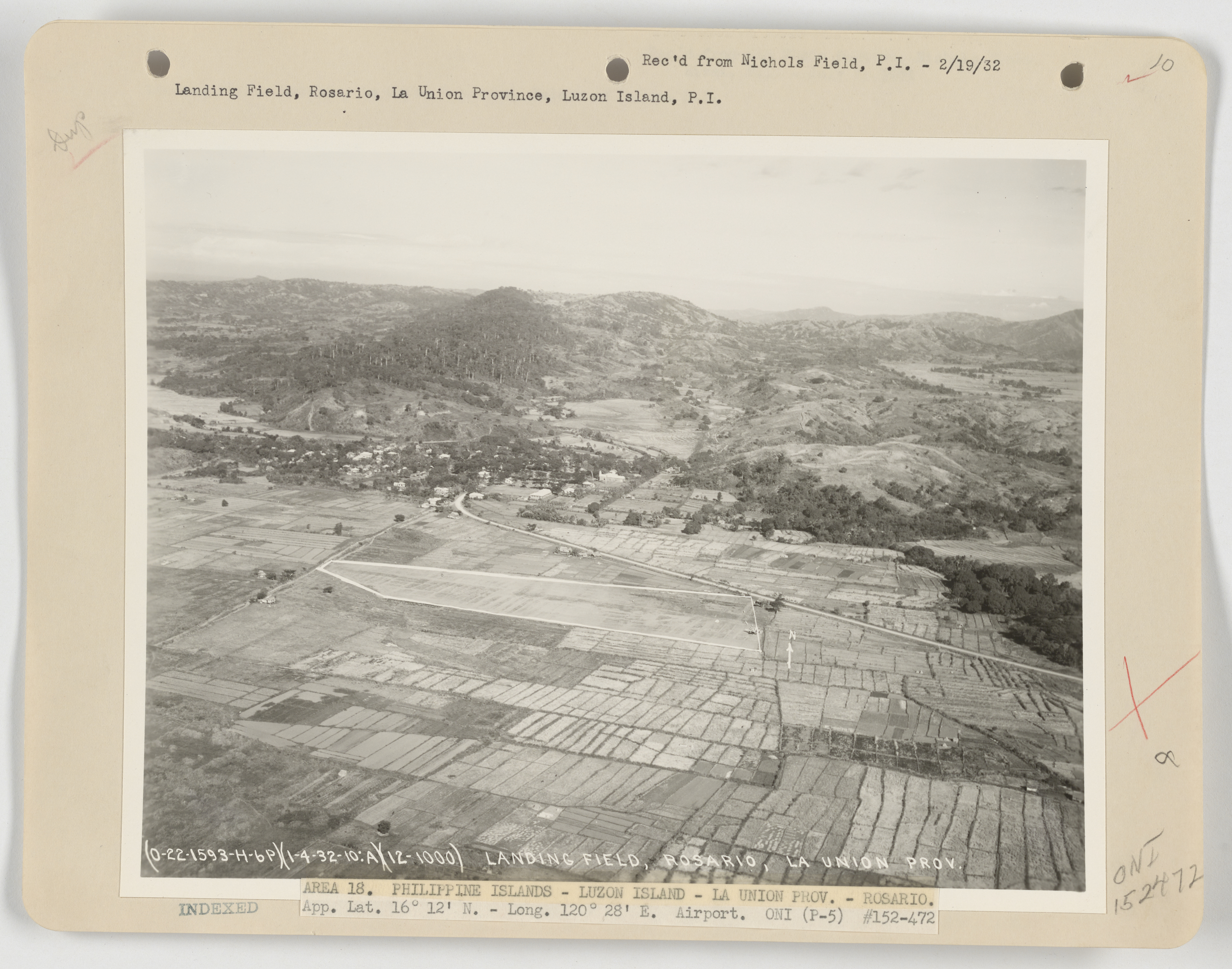
Rosario

Aerial Landing Fields in La Union, American Regime, 1930–1940s

By 1915, under Governor Mauro Ortiz, the Naguilian Road was extended to Baguio, the San Fernando Port became operational, the Balaoan-Bacnotan Road was initiated, and the Baroro and Darigayos Bridges were completed. By 1921, over 150 kilometers (93 mi) of roads had been developed, facilitating commerce and the transportation of goods.

The transition to the Philippine Commonwealth in 1935 granted La Union greater autonomy and opportunities for political engagement, though colonial structures persisted. This era fostered local development while reinforcing American influence. Full independence remained elusive until the Philippines gained sovereignty in 1946.

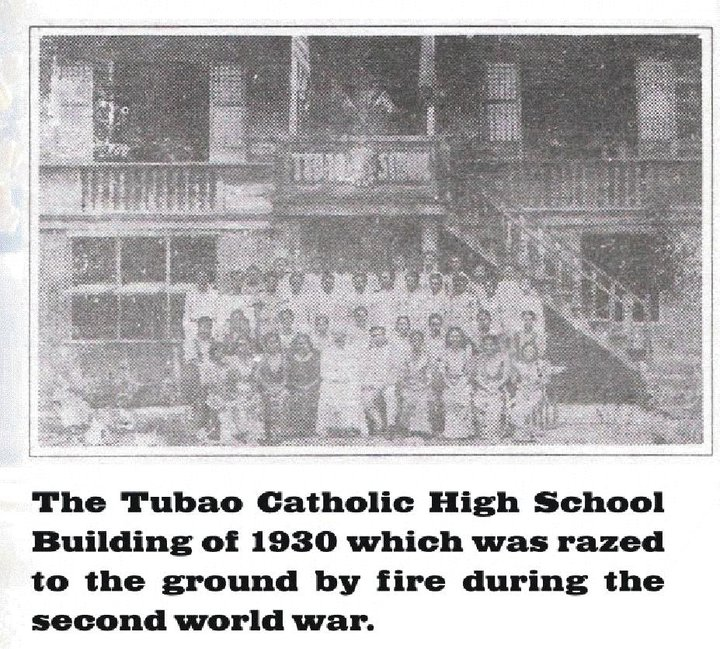

The American colonial period left a mixed legacy in La Union. While it brought modernization in education, infrastructure, and public health, it also entrenched colonial dependency and caused lasting cultural and social impacts. The memory of resistance and the province's enduring struggle for identity continues to shape its historical narrative and aspirations for self-determination.

As the Filipinos awaited independence under the Tydings-McDuffie Act, World War II erupted, further delaying their aspirations for sovereignty.

=== Japanese Occupation ===
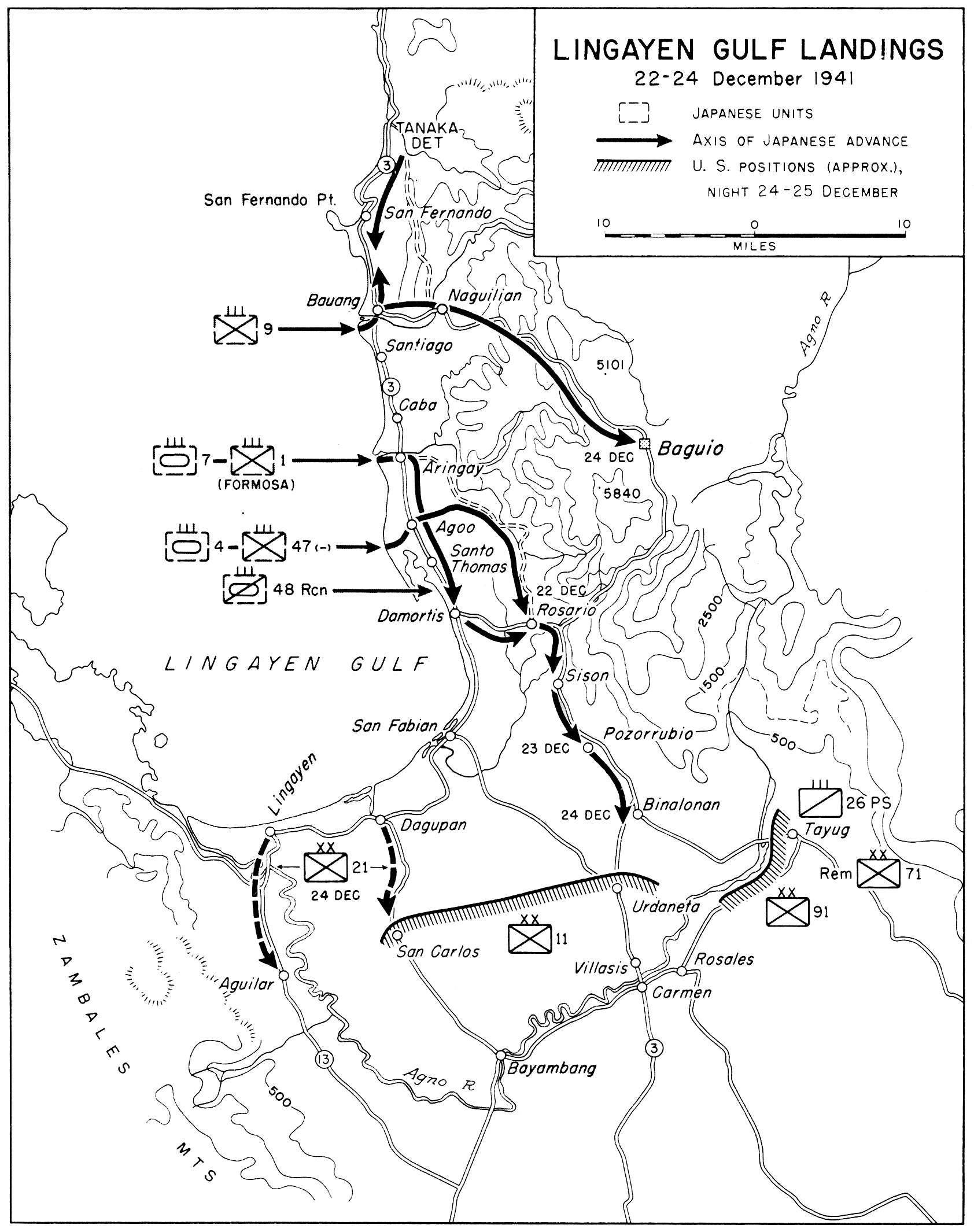
Lingayen Gulf Landings in La Union and the Japanese Advance, December 1941

The Japanese invasion of La Union during World War II was a pivotal moment in the province's history, given its strategic importance to both Allied and Japanese forces. In 8 December 1941, Japan launched an attack on U.S. military installations including the Camp Wallace and residential areas in the province, following the attack on Pearl Harbor.

By 11 December, the Japanese forces had successfully captured Vigan and dispatched additional troops to seize Laoag and its airfield. As American forces retreated, Lieutenan Gen. Masaharu Homma left a small garrison in Vigan and redirected the main forces to support operations at Lingayen Gulf.

By 20 December, the combined forces of the Col. Kanno and Gen. Shizuichi Tanaka Detachments advanced south along Route 3. By 21 December 1941, Japanese forces had occupied Bacnotan following the successful overcoming of Philippine defenses in the area. On 22 December, they advanced to San Fernando further consolidating their position. Japanese troops also landed in Agoo and swiftly established control over the town by early 1942. Despite these rapid advances, Filipino and American forces continued to resist the Japanese occupation, contributing to the broader efforts of the Allied campaign in the Philippines.

Battle of Rosario (Invasion of Lingayen Gulf)

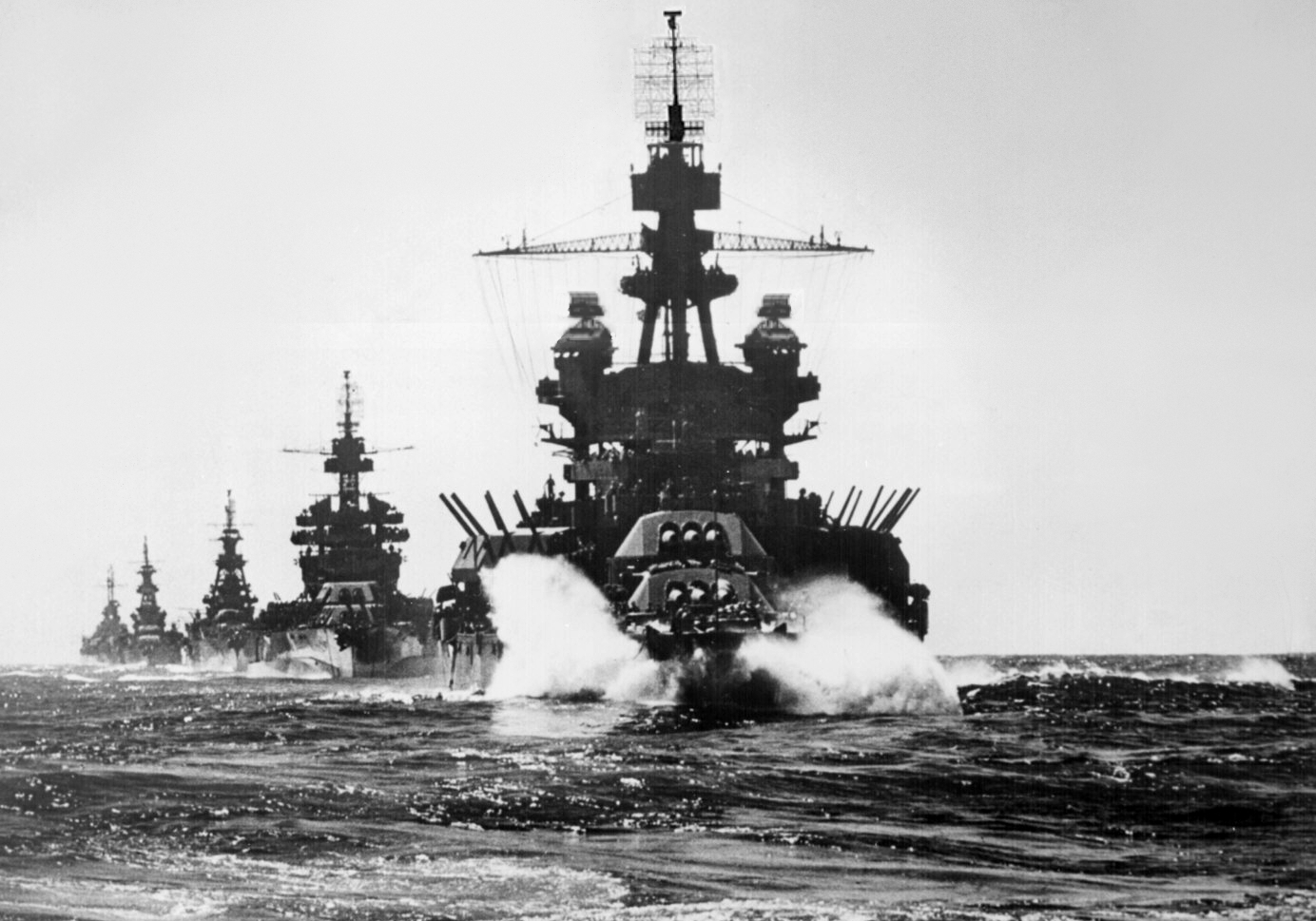
US Navy Battleship entering Lingayen Gulf, January 1945

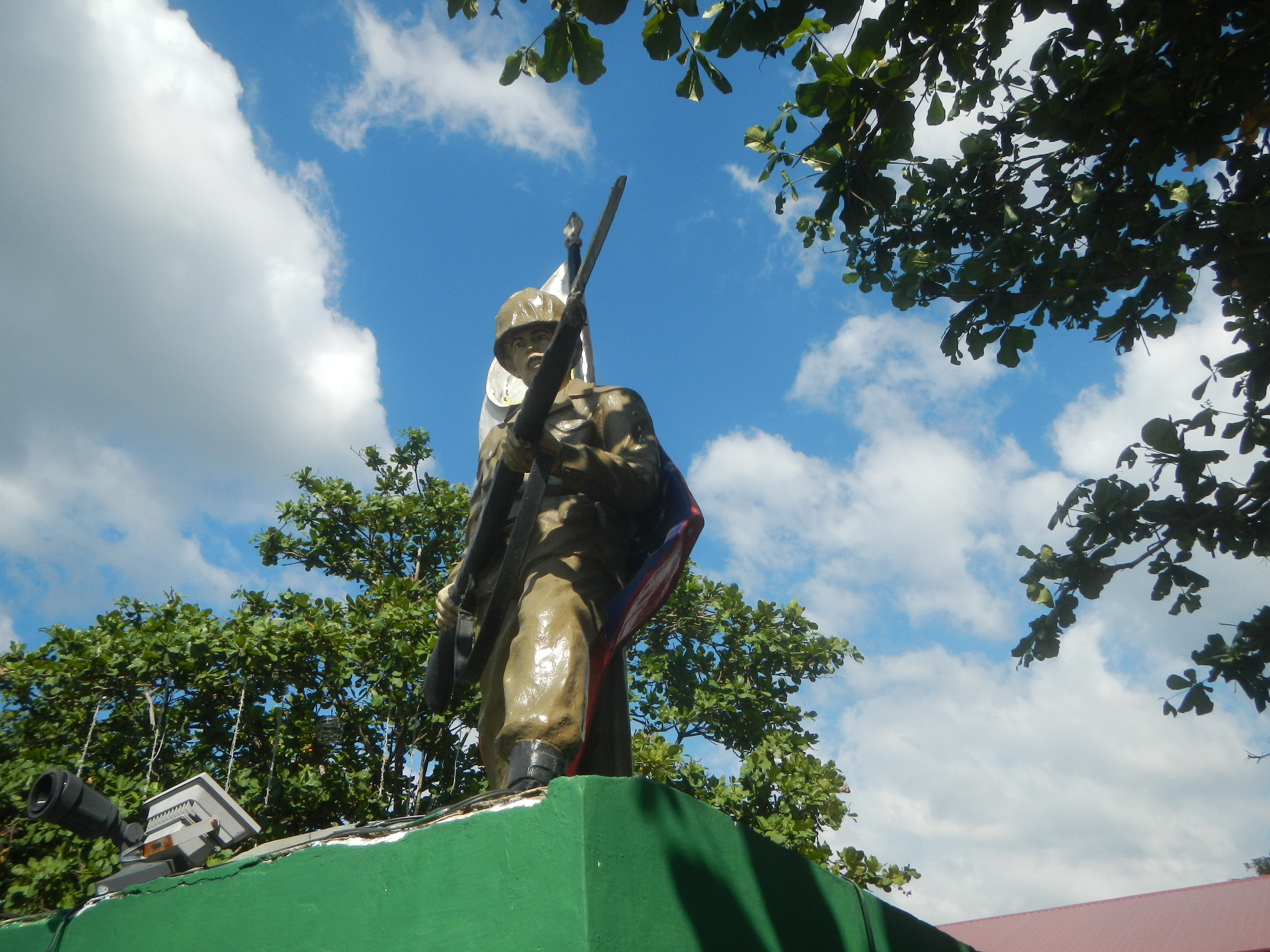
A monument honoring WWII heroes, veterans, and guerrillas in Rosario, La Union.

On 22 December 1941, the Japanese 4th Tank Regiment and the 47th Infantry Regiment under the command of Col. Isamu Yanagi, supported by a massive flotilla of navy ships tried to land in Agoo to make it one of three major beachheads for the Japanese Invasion of Lingayen Gulf, although weather dispersed their forces and made them deploy on a wide stretch of beach that ranged from Poro Point (San Fernando) to as far south as Damortis. These forces later met the commonwealth defence forces—consisting of the 26th Cavalry Regiment (Philippine Scouts), the Philippine 21st Division, the Philippine 11th Division, and the newly formed Philippine 71st Division—in what would later be called the Battle of Rosario.

During the Japanese occupation in the province, La Union was governed by Gov. Jorge Camacho (1941–1942), Gov. Bonifacio Tadiar (1942–1944), and Gov. Bernardo Gapuz (1945) under the administration of President José P. Laurel's Japanese-sponsored "puppet" government. The province endured strict military controls, forced labor, food shortages, and widespread violence including extrajudicial killings and sexual violence. Despite these conditions, resistance movements emerged, with many residents engaging in guerrilla warfare against Japanese forces. Guerrilla camps was established all over the province including Camp Spencer in Darigayos, Luna and Camp 121 and Barrio San Cristobal in Bangar.

Mangkaeng Massacre

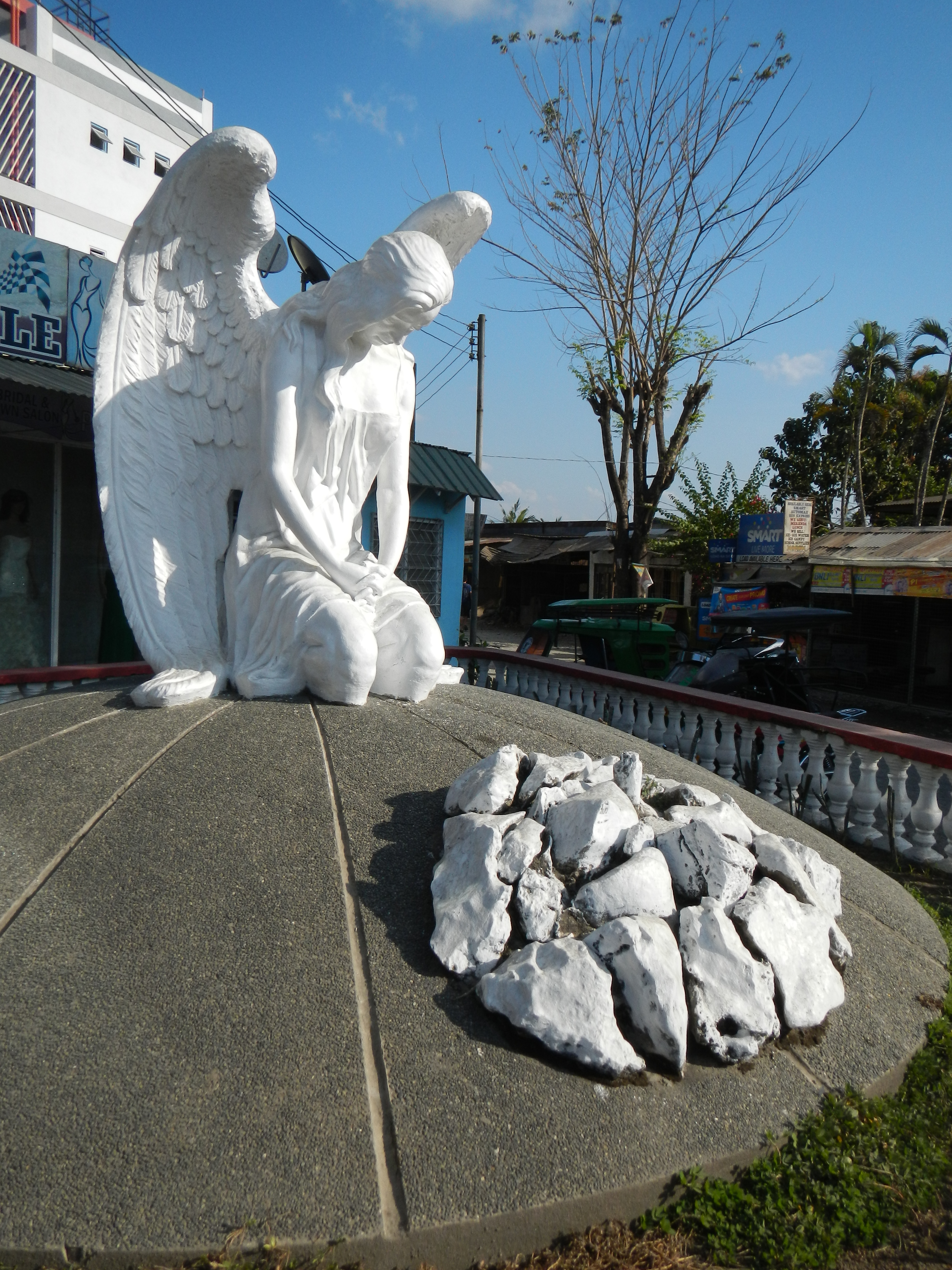
Tomb of the Unknown Soldiers, Naguilian

In Naguilian, over 400 refugees from the barrios of Imelda, Natividad, and Ortiz sought refuge in the small, forested sitio of Mangkaeng in barrio Gusing Norte to escape Japanese forces stationed in the town proper as part of General Tomoyuki Yamashita’s rear guard during his retreat to the Cordillera mountains. The area served as a strategic route for Japanese soldiers traveling between lowland and Cordillera camps particularly Baguio.

On the early morning of 23 January 1945, Japanese troops launched a sudden and brutal attack on Mangkaeng, aiming to eliminate potential resistance or witnesses. The unarmed villagers were caught off guard as gunfire (bayonet) erupted, killing men, women, and children. Some families attempted to flee into nearby creeks and the dense forest, hoping for cover, but the soldiers were relentless, pursuing and killing those who tried to escape. Others hid in nearby caves or bushes, clinging to the hope of survival while hearing the cries of those captured. Some survivors managed to reach neighboring villages, where they warned others of the massacre, spreading shock and grief across the province.

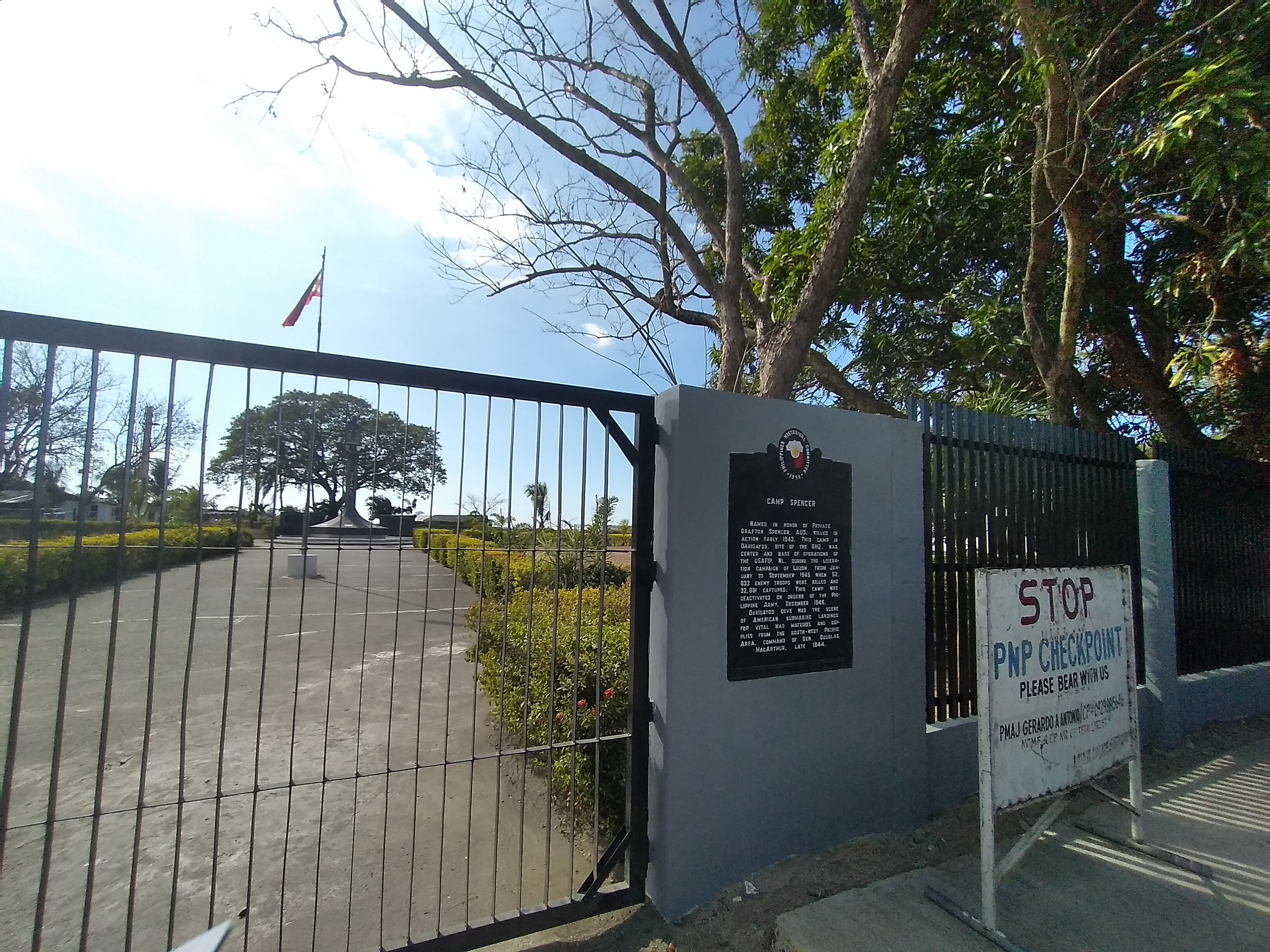
USAFIP-NL "Camp Spencer" National Military Shrine and Park

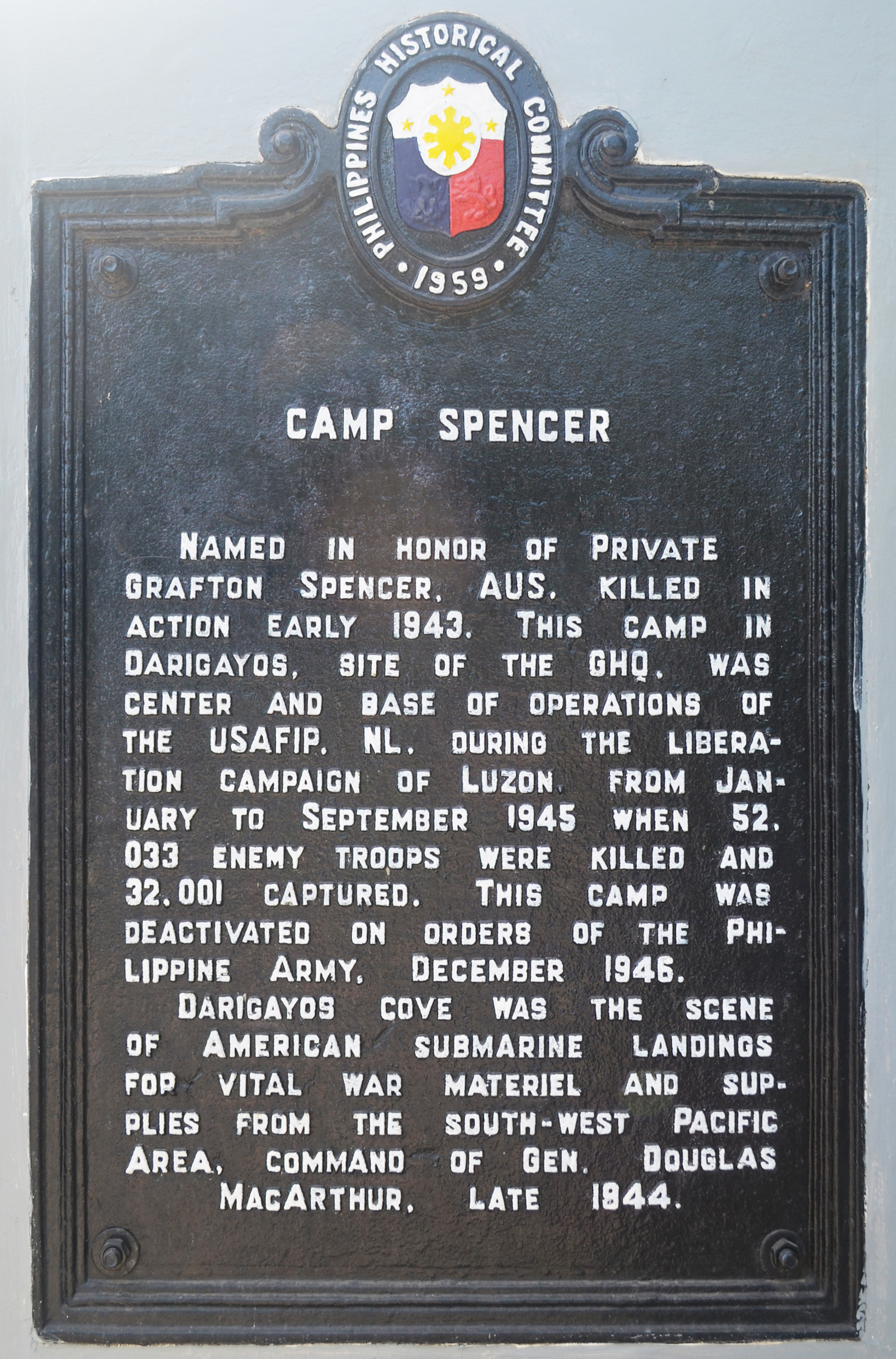
Camp Spencer NHCP historical marker in Darigayos, Luna

Battle of Baroro

On 4 January 1945, Filipino-American forces captured the Baroro Bridge in Bacnotan, marking a significant turning point in the liberation of the province during World War II. The bridge, a vital link connecting Northern Luzon to San Fernando, was a strategic objective for the Allied forces. The operation began with an assault by the 121st Infantry Regiment of the United States Armed Forces in the Philippines, Northern Luzon (USAFIP-NL), against Japanese positions along the south bank of the Baroro River. The battle was characterized by heavy exchanges of gunfire, with the Filipino-American troops ultimately securing the bridge after intense fighting. This victory played a crucial role in ensuring the liberation of La Union and was followed by subsequent operations, including the Battle of San Fernando and the capture of Bacsil Ridge.

Battle of San Fernando

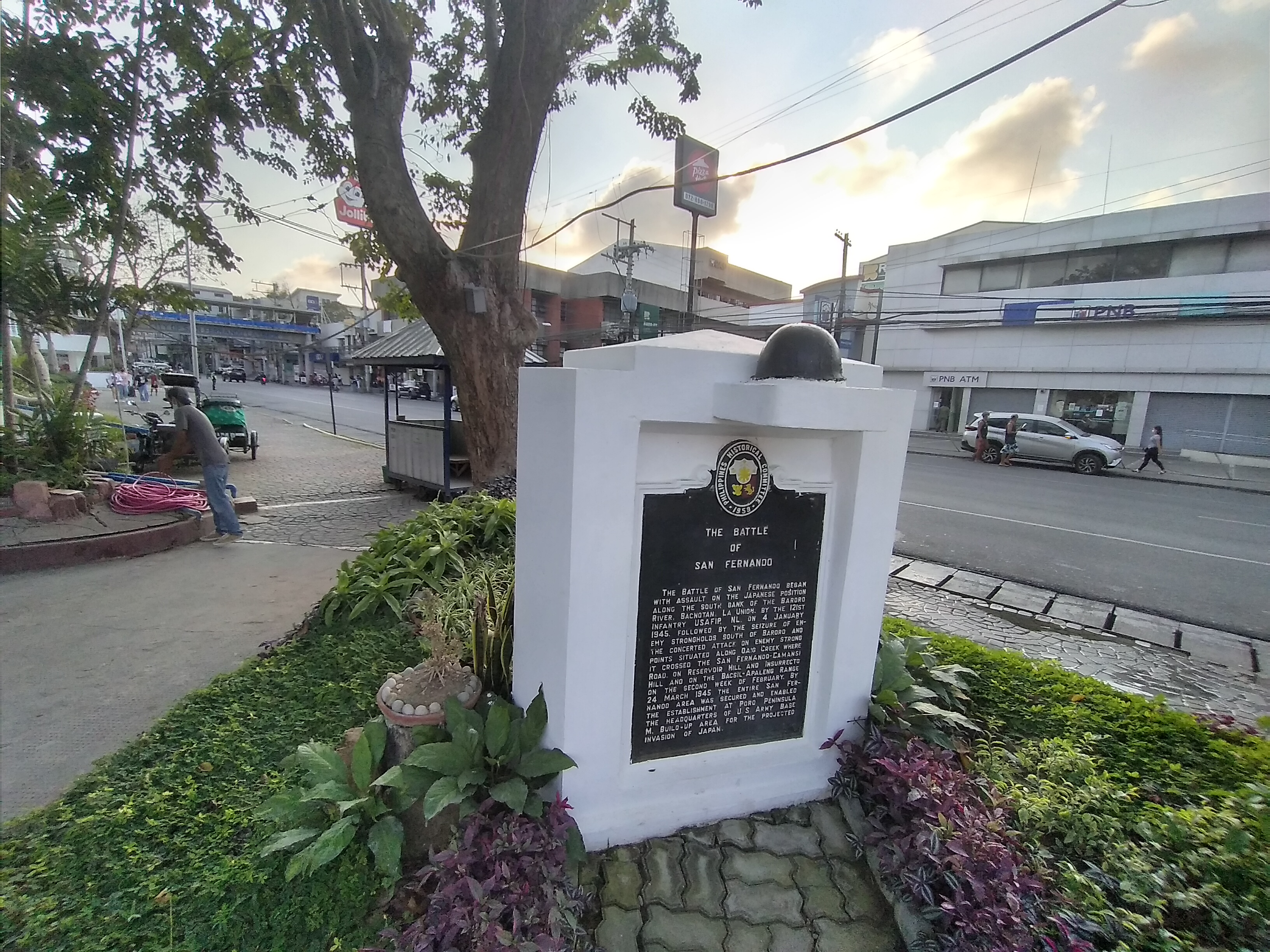
Vicinity of the NHCP Historical Marker for the Battle of San Fernando

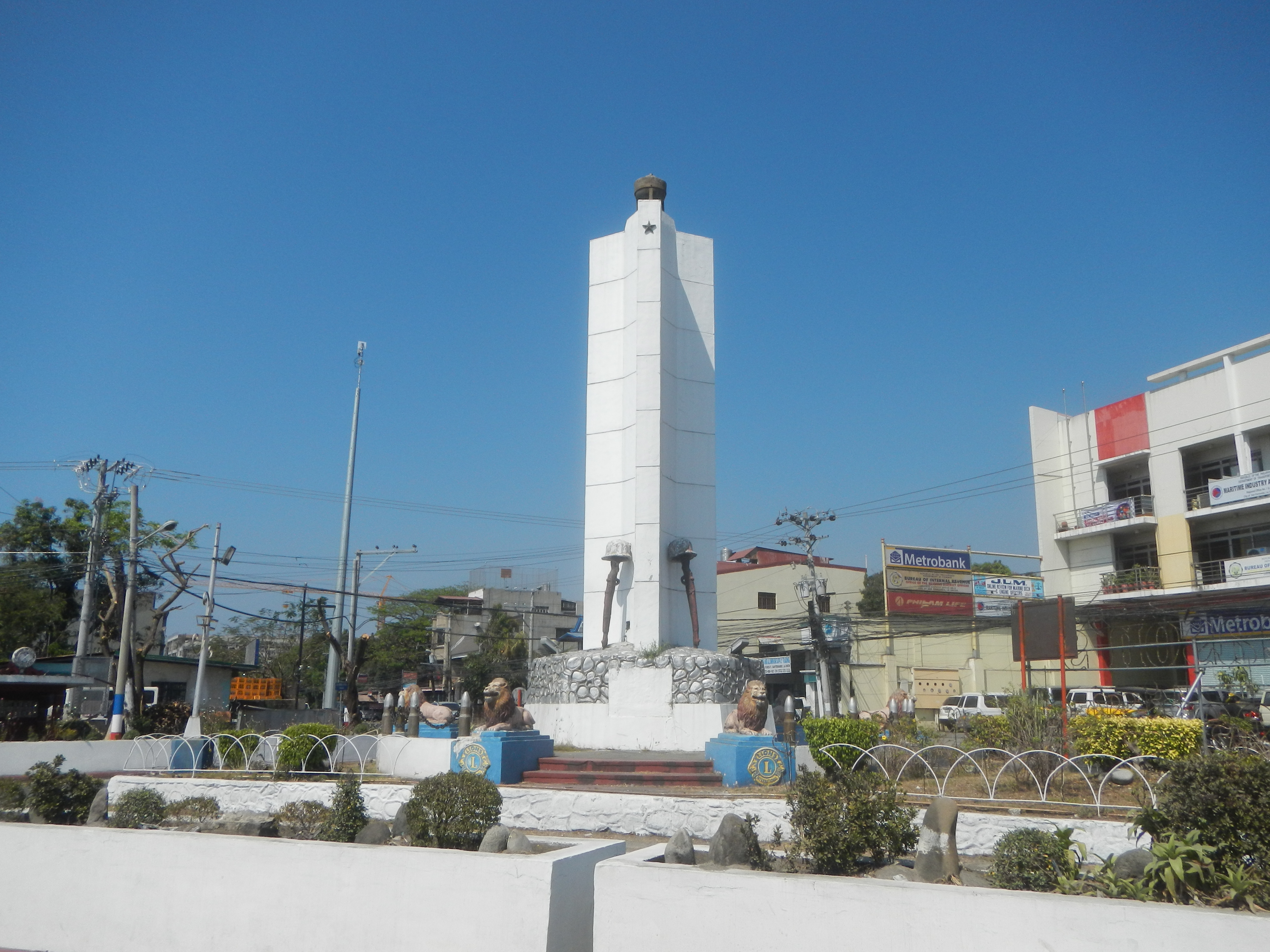
The Monument of the Unknown Soldier, San Fernando City

Following the Battle of Baroro, Allied forces launched a concerted attack on Japanese strongholds to the south of Baroro. This included operations targeting key enemy positions along Oaig Creek, where it crossed the San Fernando–Camasin Road, as well as strategic locations such as Reservoir Hill, Insurrecto Hill, and the Bacsil–Apaleng Range. These assaults took place during the second week of February 1945 as part of the broader campaign to secure San Fernando and its surrounding areas.

By 24 March 1945, after the Battle in Bacsil Ridge Allied forces had successfully secured the entire San Fernando area. This victory enabled the establishment of a critical military base "Camp Wallce" at Poro Peninsula, which became the headquarters for U.S. Army Base M. The area also served as a vital build-up zone for the projected invasion of Japan, marking a crucial step in the Allied preparations for the final stages of the Pacific War.

Battle of Bacsil Ridge

The Battle of Bacsil Ridge was fought in March 1945 was one of the continued main battles of the Philippines Campaign of the Second World War are between the Filipino soldiers under the 121st Infantry Regiment, Philippine Commonwealth Army, USAFIP-NL, under the command of Russell W. Volckmann, and the Japanese Imperial forces under by General Tomoyuki Yamashita.

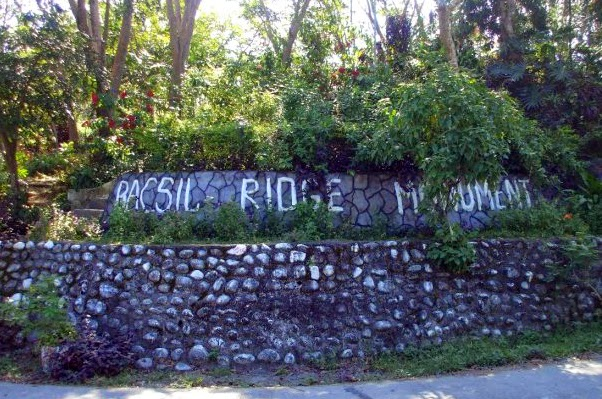
Monument at Bacsil Ridge, marking the site of the historic battle

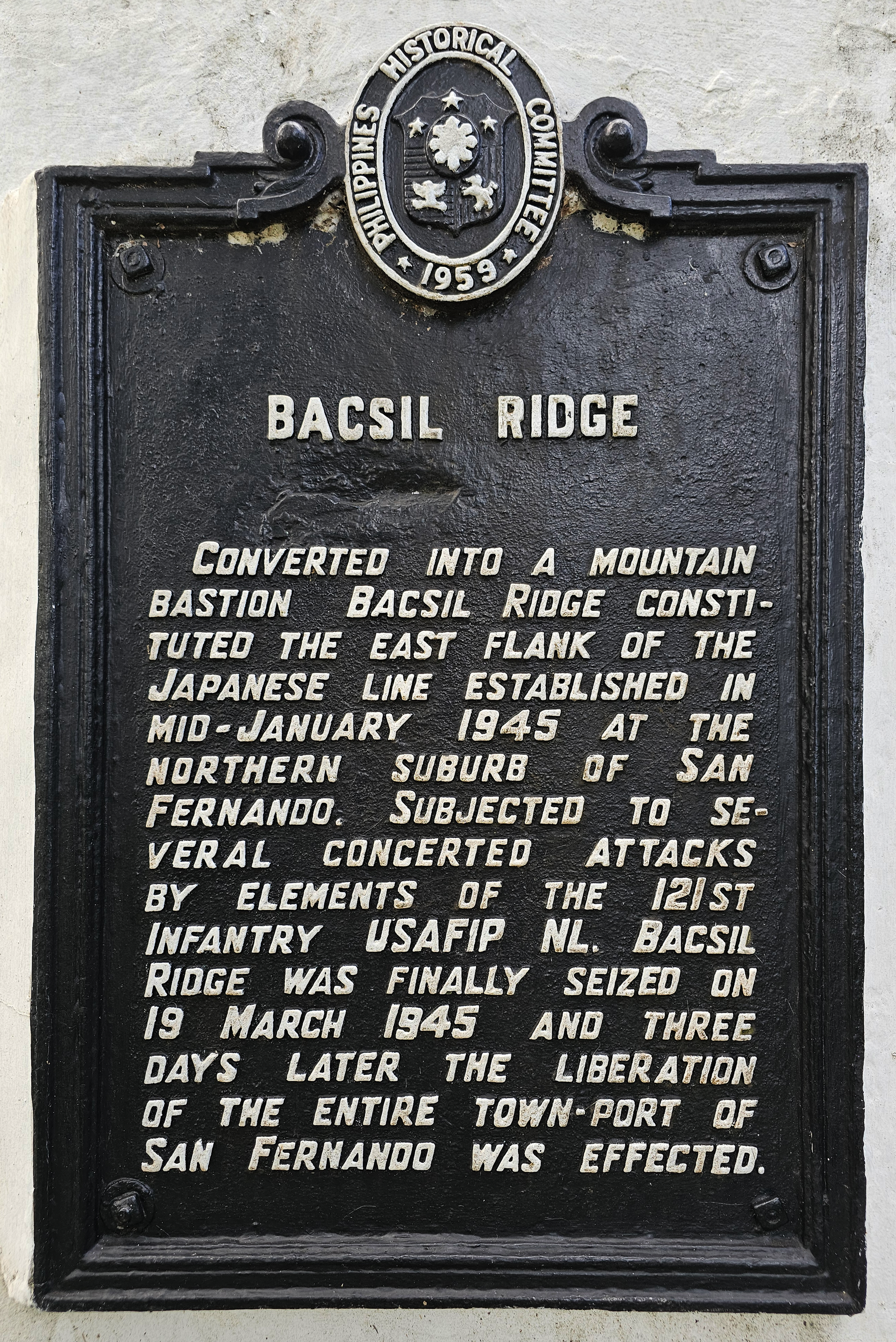
Bacsil Ridge NHCP historical marker

The Battle of Bacsil Ridge ended the month-long battle for control of San Fernando. The Japanese defenders called the Hayashi Detachment, composed of 3,000 armed troops and 2,000 unarmed support forces, took hold of San Fernando and its surrounding areas which denied entry to the port of the town and a road leading to Baguio. As part of the San Fernando-Bacsil Operations, the 1st Battalion of 121st Infantry were sent to loosen the enemy positions starting late February with the assistance of the Allied Air Force.

The 1st Battalion made a general attack to the ridge on 16 March 1945 and fought the Japanese defenders until the capture of Bacsil on 19 March. On the same day, the 3rd battalion captured the Reservoir Hill. The Battle of Bacsil Ridge between the Filipino soldiers and recognized guerrillas and the Japanese Forces resulted in the recapture of San Fernando, La Union. Which resulted in the capture of San Fernando, La Union on 23 March 1945, and Bacnotan, La Union and the military offensive throughout the province ended on 24 March after two months of fighting.

Liberation of Bauang

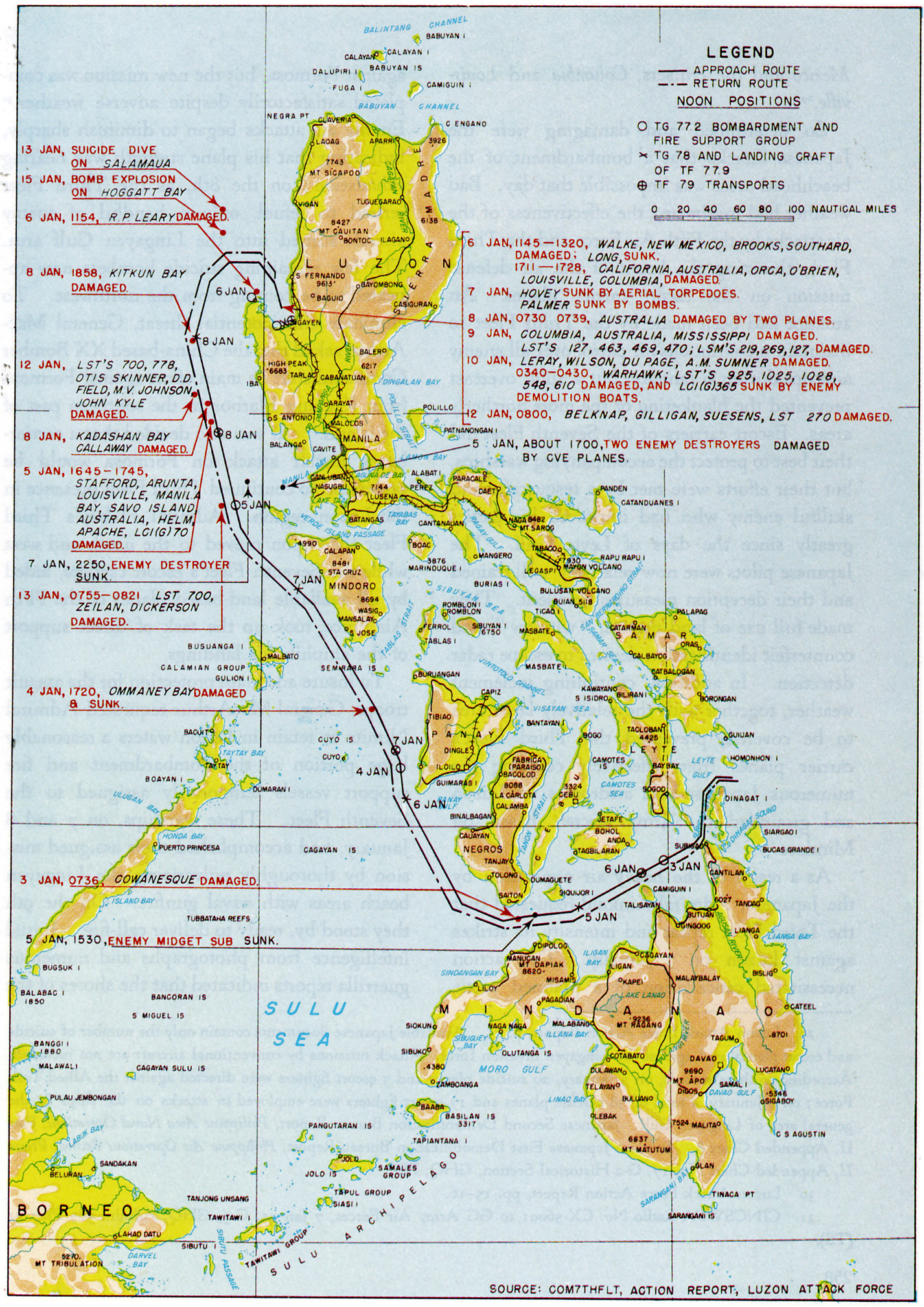
Approach of U.S. Naval Forces to Lingayen Gulf, January 1945 (Map)

The Liberation of Bauang, was part of the San Fernando-Bascil operations aimed to liberate the province of La Union and open one of the roads to Baguio. Units from Rosario, La Union including elements of the 2nd Battalion, 121st Infantry of the United States Army Forces in the Philippines – Northern Luzon (USAFIP-NL) under the command of Major Diego Sipin, were tasked to make the northward advance to Bauang.

The 2nd Battalion, 121st Infantry, USAFIP-NL reinforce the other battalions in the efforts to capture San Fernando. Meanwhile, combat units from the "B" company, 1st Battalion, 121st Infantry, USAFIP-NL attacked the defensive lines in Bauang to aid the 1st Battalion, 130th Infantry (US) in its advance from the south. Bauang was first liberated on 19 March 1945, followed by the declaration of the end of operations at La Union on 24 March 1945. On 4 January 1945, La Union was liberated by the Battle of San Fernando and Bacsil Ridge.

As San Fernando was in ruins at the time, Bacnotan became the provisional seat of the province administration after the war. The La Union National High School was also relocated to Bacnotan as a result of this relocation. When things returned to normal, the provincial government was relocated to San Fernando, followed by the La Union National High School. The North Provincial High School was established after the provincial high school in Bacnotan was transferred (now Bacnotan National High School).

=== Post-war Era ===
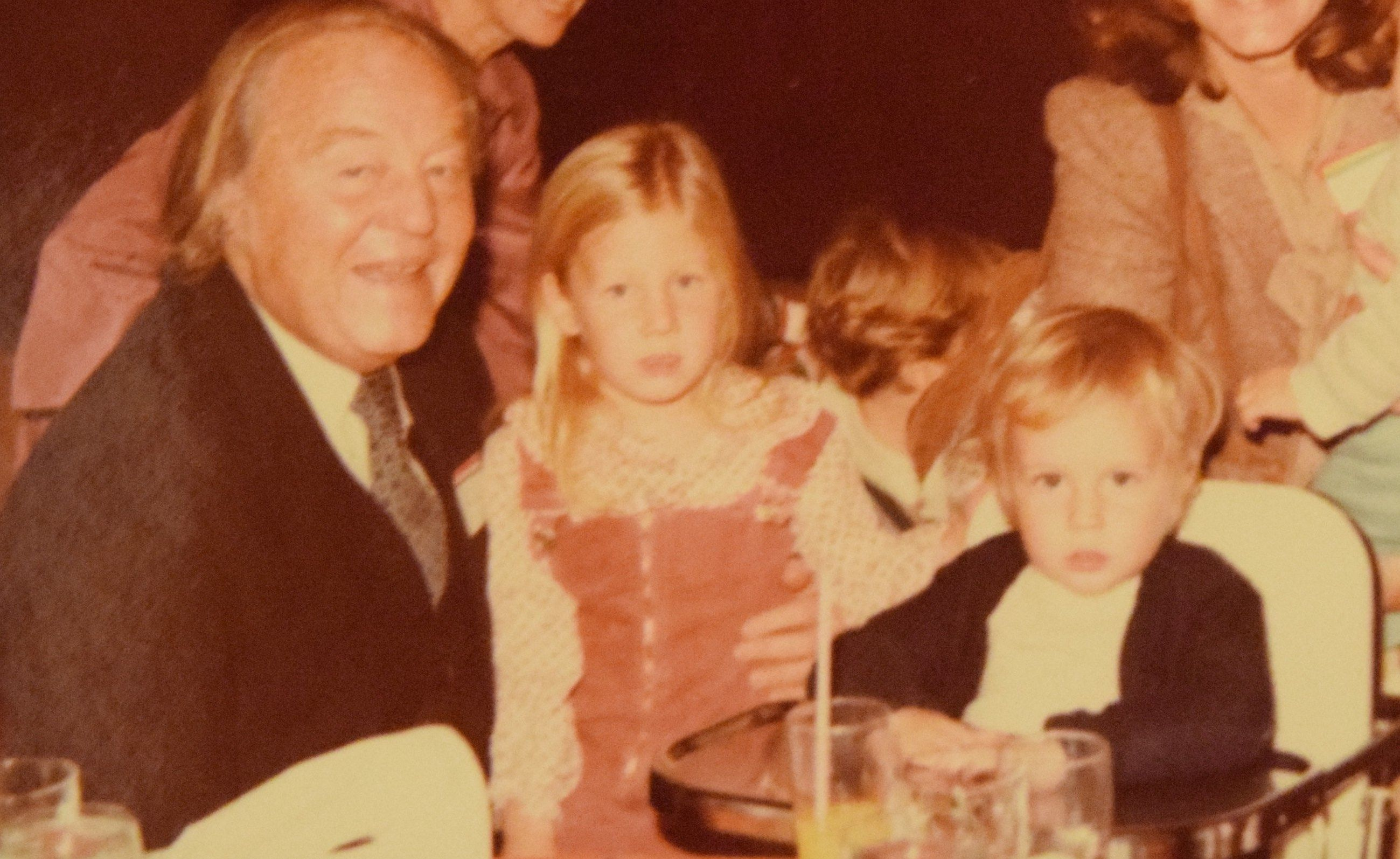
Harry Stonehill, Accused in the Stonehill Scandal

The postwar recovery period marked a return of the tobacco industry to the Ilocos Region. Ever since the end of the tobacco monopoly, tobacco production had declined in the Ilocos as Filipinos started shifting from locally made cigars to foreign made cigarettes. But after reading a feature article series by Maximo Soliven which explained why Virginia tobacco would grow well on Ilocos soil, businessman Harry Stonehill was convinced to invest extensively in rebuilding the industry. He established the Philippine Tobacco Flue-Curing and Redrying Corporation (PTFCRC) in 1951 and recruited farmers throughout Region 1 to produce tobacco. The following year, La Union Congressman Manuel T. Cases filed a bill to "limit the importation of foreign leaf tobacco," which was eventually signed by President Elpidio Quirino as Republic Act No. 698. This allowed Stonehill's investments to make a handsome profit, and the newly-rebuilt local industry to bloom. While Stonehill was later deported in the 1960s for tax evasion and bribery of government officials in what would later be called the Stonehill scandal, the tobacco industry continued to grow.

=== Martial law era ===
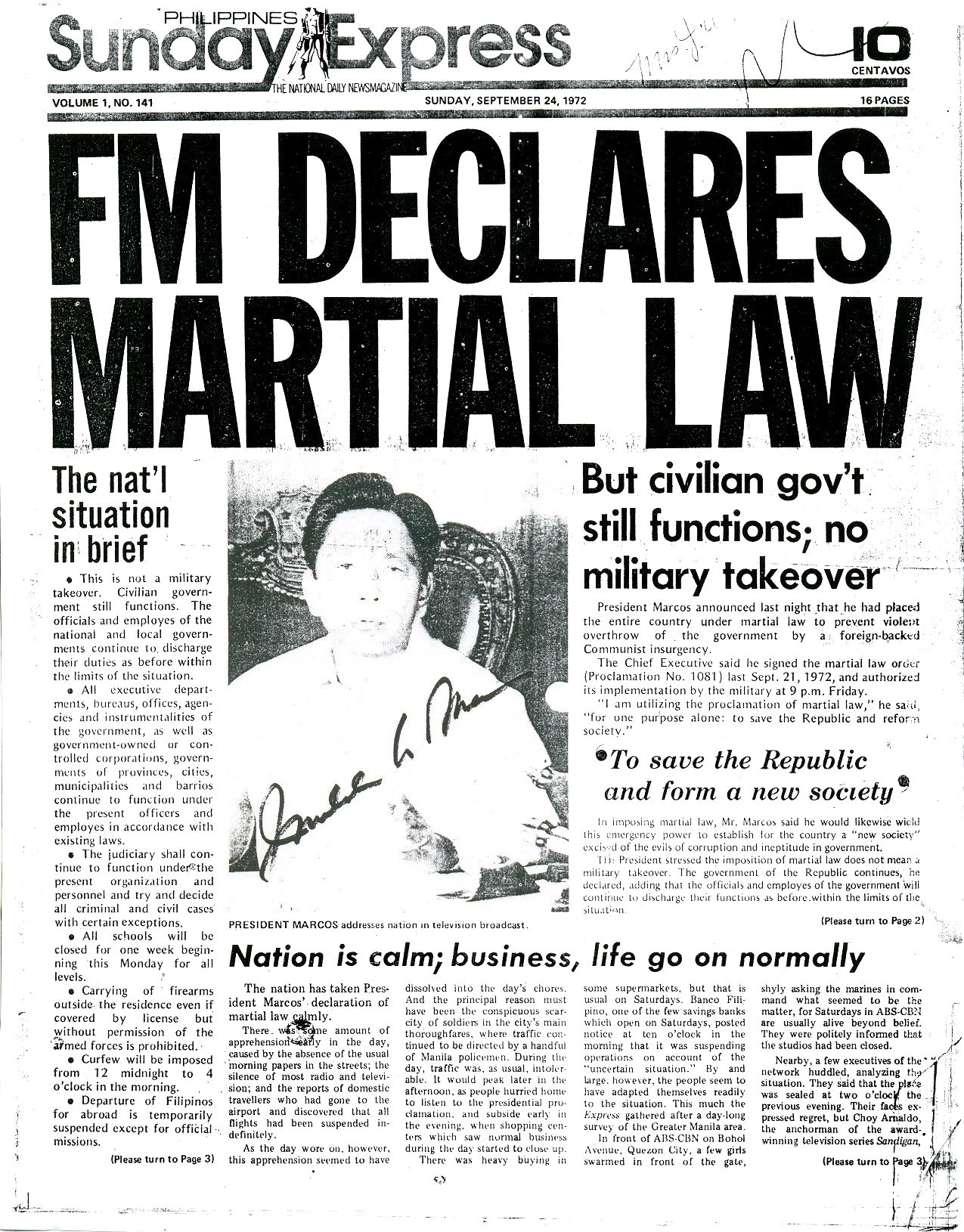
Marcos Declares Martial Law: 24 September 1972, issue of the Sunday Express (Sunday edition of the Philippines Daily Express)

Although economically affected by the rapid peso devaluation brought about by unbridled election spending heading into the 1969 presidential elections, political life in La Union was not significantly impacted by Ferdinand Marcos’ declaration of Martial Law in 1972.

The powerful family factions which had dominated La Union politics since before the American colonial era largely remained in place, although the family of Congressman Jose D. Aspiras became much more prominent after he became Marcos’ Tourism Minister. The main political change was the increased power of regional and provincial offices of national agencies, whose directors were answerable directly to Marcos.

This technique used by Marcos to consolidate political power did not get much resistance in the Ilocos Region, including La Union, which had strong ethnic associations with the Marcos family. The Marcos administration's use of violent methods for stifling dissent thus mostly took place in other, non-Ilocano provinces, such as nearby Abra, Kalinga, and Mountain Province. Long-time second district congressman Manuel T. Cases had formed an alliance with Marcos along with the other strongman congressmen of the Ilocos Region, and his successor Jose D. Aspiras was also a close associate of Marcos who was made Minister of Tourism after Martial Law was declared.

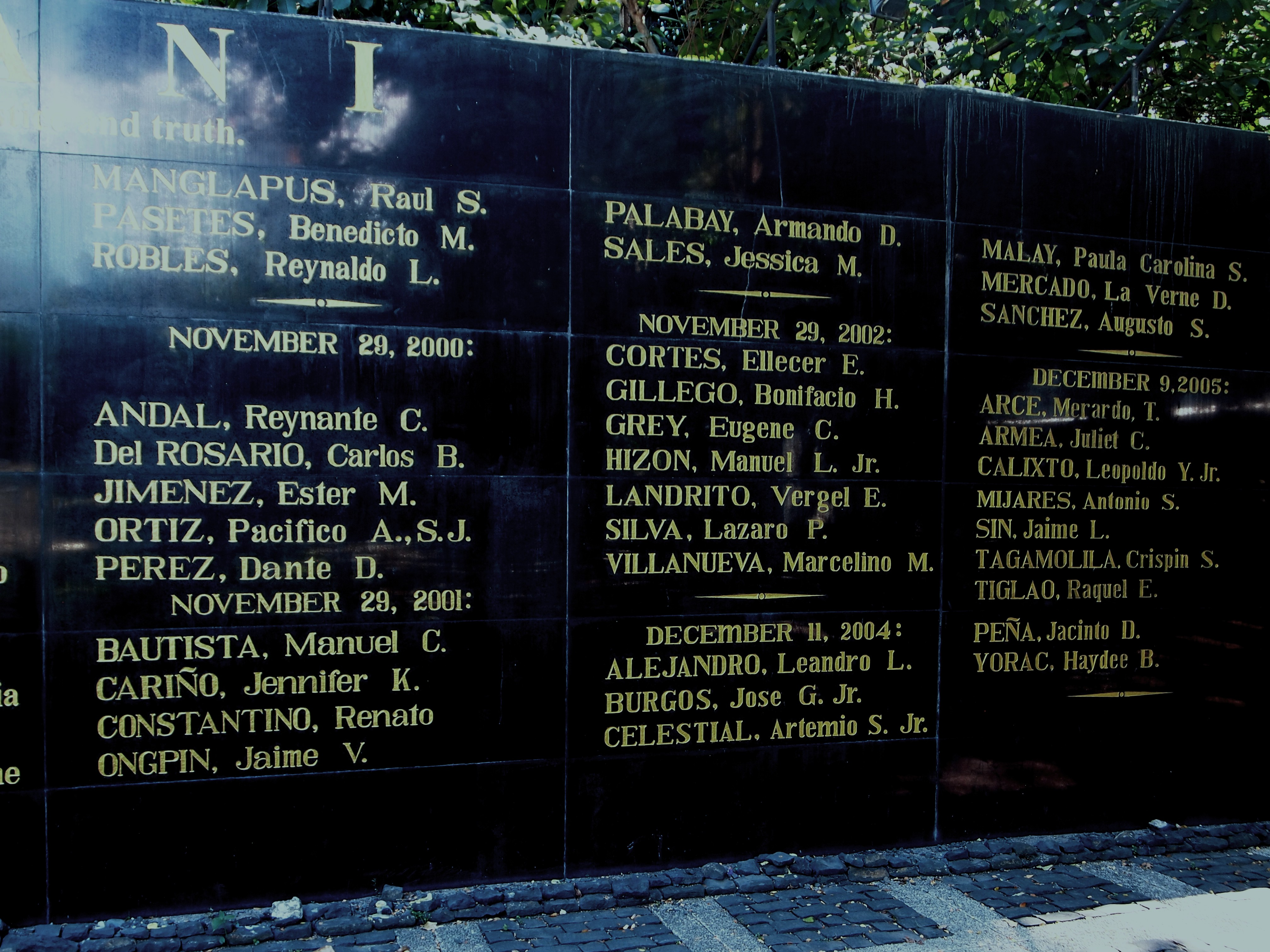
Wall of Remembrance at the Bantayog ng mga Bayani including Armando Palabay

But there were still La Union natives who were willing to object to the authoritarian practices and abuses of the Marcos administration, despite personal risk. This included San-Fernando-raised student activists Romulo and Armando Palabay, UP Students and La Union National High School alumni who were imprisoned for their protest activities, tortured at Camp Olivas in Pampanga, and later separately killed before the end of Martial Law. Romulo (age 22) and Armando (age 21) were posthumously honored when their names were etched on the Wall of Remembrance at the Philippines' Bantayog ng mga Bayani, which honors the heroes and martyrs who fought the authoritarian regime.

Agoo, La Union, native Antonio L. Mabutas had become Archbishop of Davao by the time of Martial Law, and spoke actively against the human rights abuses of that time, particularly the torture and killings of church workers. The pastoral letter he wrote against Martial law, "Reign of Terror in the Countryside," is notable for having been the first pastoral to be written against Marcos' martial law administration, and even doubly notable because Mabutas was considered a conservative within the Catholic church hierarchy in the Philippines.

=== Contemporary ===
==== 1990 Luzon earthquake ====
La Union was severely hit by the 1990 Luzon earthquake. Five municipalities in La Union were affected: Agoo, Aringay, Caba, Santo Tomas, and Tubao with a combined population of 132,208. Many buildings, including the Agoo Municipal hall, the Museo de Iloko, the parish church of Aringay, and the Basilica Minore of our Lady of Charity, collapsed or were severely damaged. 100,000 families were displaced when two coastal villages sank due to liquefaction. The province suffered many casualties leaving 32 people dead.

==== 2010s Tourism Boom ====
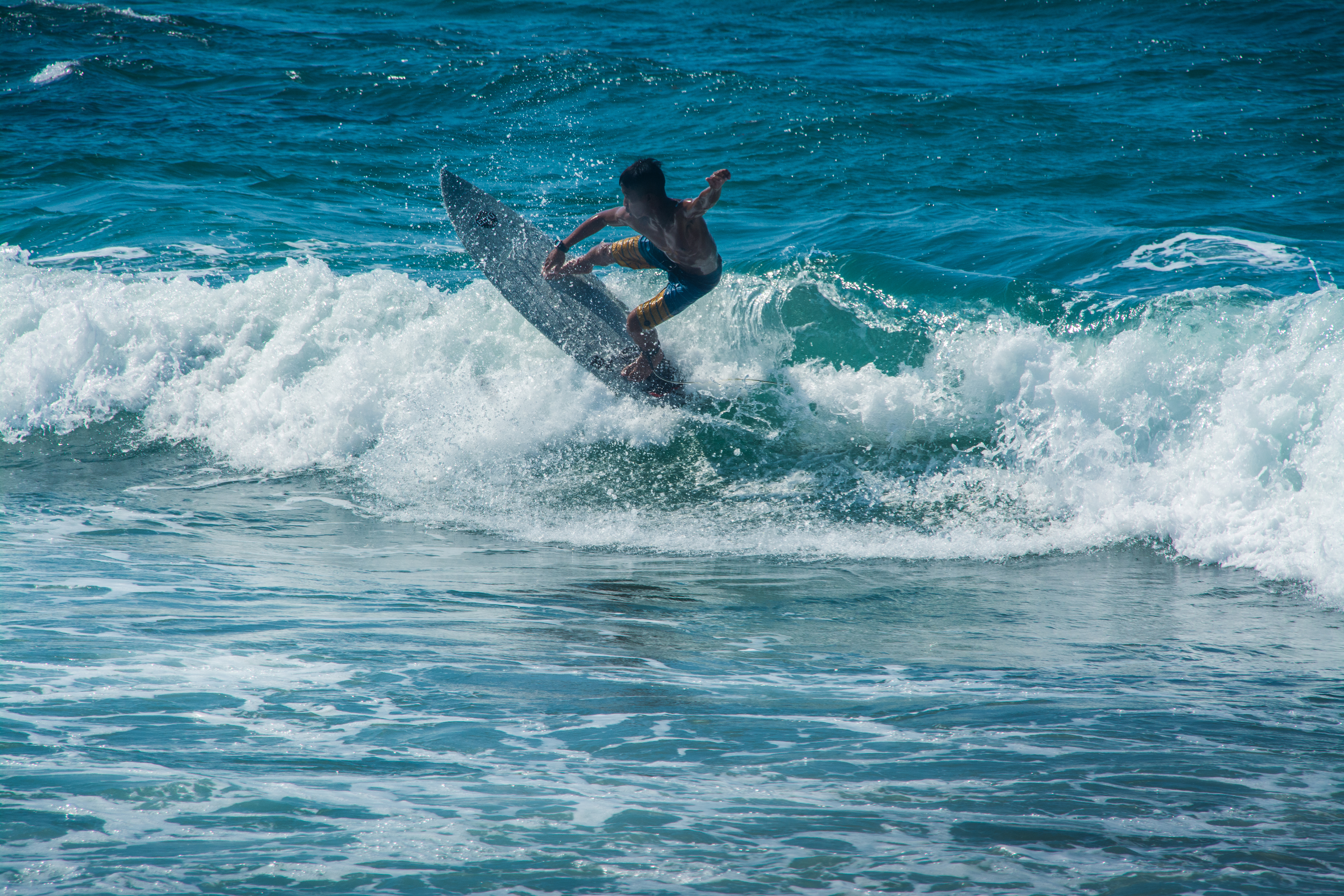
San Juan Surf: Surfing Capital of the Northern Philippines

From the mid-2000s to the early 2010s, an influx of entrepreneurs began putting up establishments such as boho-chic-style art hostels and third-wave coffeeshops in San Juan and Agoo. They were initially attracted to the already-established surfing scene of Barangay Urbiztondo in San Juan, but eventually envisioned business in the province as an alternative to the stresses of city-based employment. This coincided with the phase-by-phase opening of the Tarlac–Pangasinan–La Union Expressway (TPLEX), which made La Union more accessible to tourists from Metro Manila.

Alongside the rising influence of social media outlets Twitter and Instagram, these factors led to a drastic tourism boom that made San Juan—previously been seen as just one of the Philippines' many surfing venues—a major backpacker's destination whose attractions centered on surfing and art.

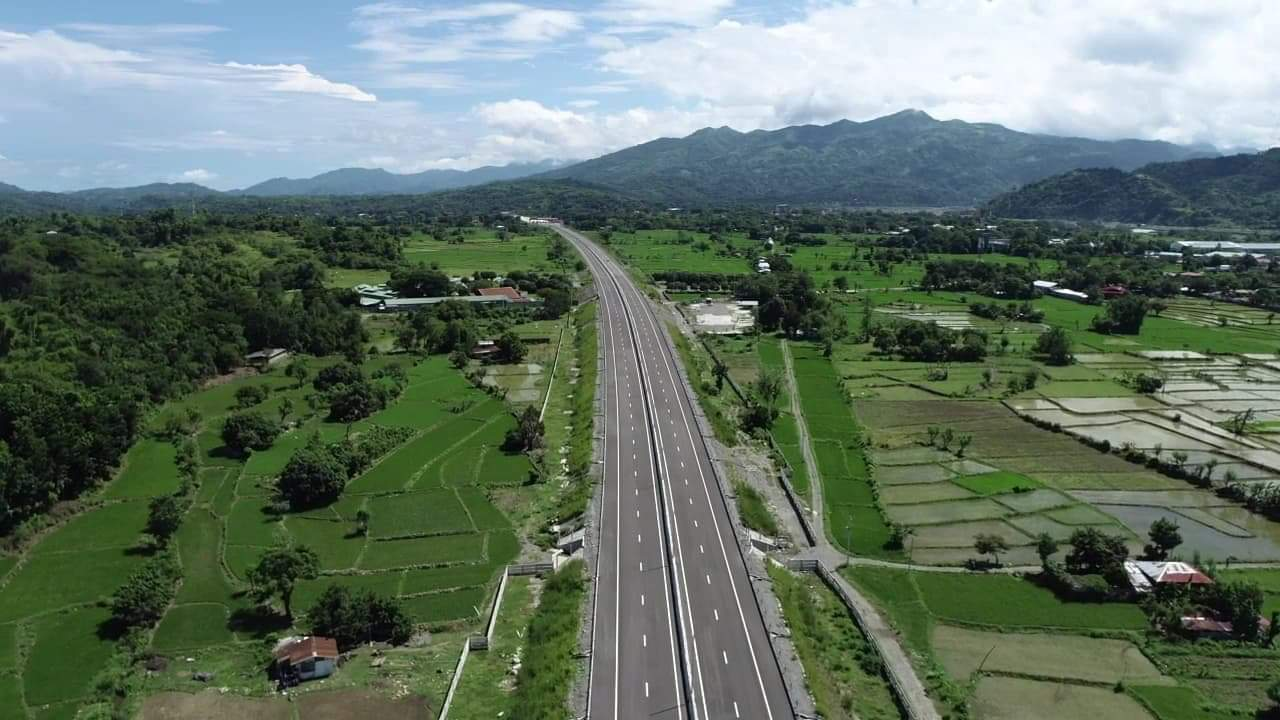
TPLEX Sison-Rosario segment

San Juan began to be featured prominently in independent films such as Jay Abello's 2015 film Flotsam and JP Habac's 2017 film I'm Drunk, I Love You, and the province began to be referred to by the colloquial initialism "ElYu."

Among Philippines literary circles, the town of Bauang has also become a pilgrimage site of sorts for celebrating the life of and works of writer and World War II martyr Manuel Arguilla, with writers visiting the author's hometown to experience the landscapes that inspired him, and which featured prominently in his stories. The most prominent event celebrating Arguilla was the 2017 run of the Taboan Literary Festival, a celebration of Philippine literature which changes venues every year, organized by the National Commission on Culture and the Arts during every National Arts Month in February. Among the prominent artists who spoke about Arguilla at the festival were writer-academic Butch Dalisay and National Artist of the Philippines for literature Bienvenido Lumbera.

== Geography ==
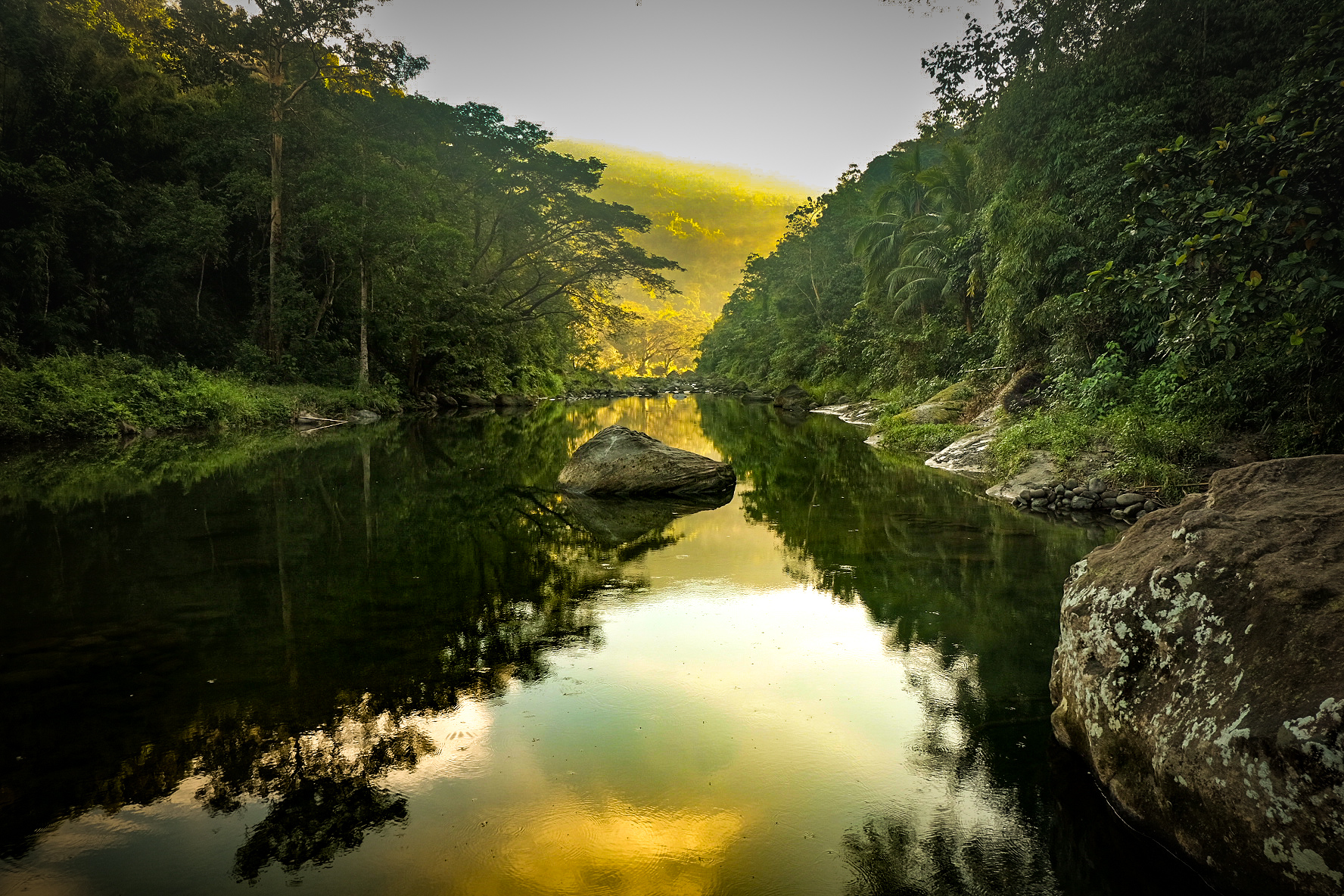
Baroro River Basin, San Gabriel

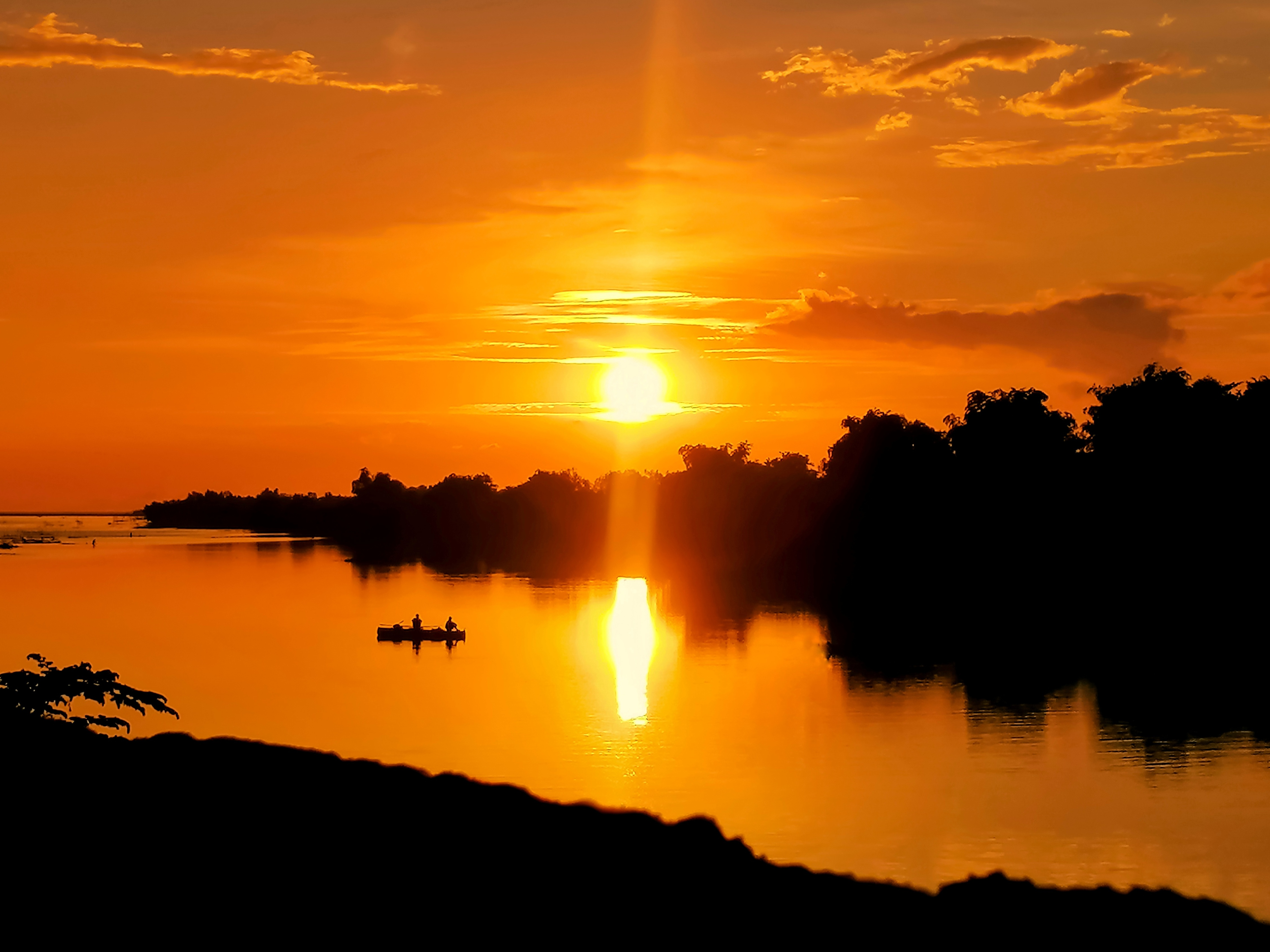
Aringay River, Aringay

La Union, located in the southwestern part of the Ilocos Region, is bordered to the north and northeast by Ilocos Sur, to the south by Pangasinan, to the east by Benguet, and to the west by the Lingayen Gulf and South China Sea. Geographically, it lies 273 kilometers (170 mi) north of Metro Manila and 57 kilometers (35 mi) northwest of Baguio City.

Among the provinces in the Ilocos Region, La Union is the smallest in terms of land area, covering 149,309 hectares, which constitutes 11.60% of the region's total land area and about 0.5% of the entire country. The province is divided into two districts. District I, comprising 70,069 hectares (46.93% of the province's land area), includes San Gabriel, the largest municipality, with 15,500 hectares, followed by the City of San Fernando with 10,688 hectares, while Luna is the smallest. District II covers 79,240 hectares (53.07% of the province), with Bagulin having the largest area, followed by Aringay, while Santo Tomas occupies the least space.

=== Topography ===
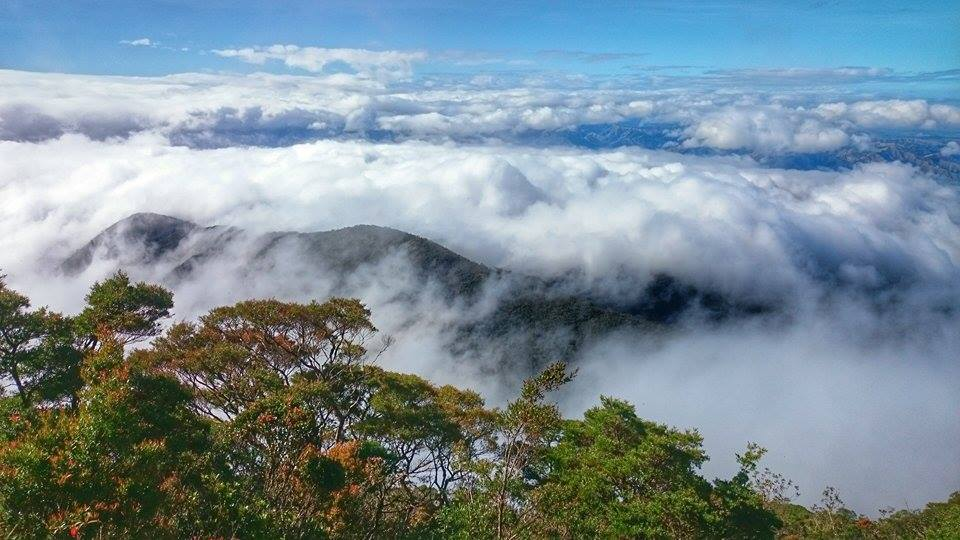
Mt. Kimmallugong in Caba

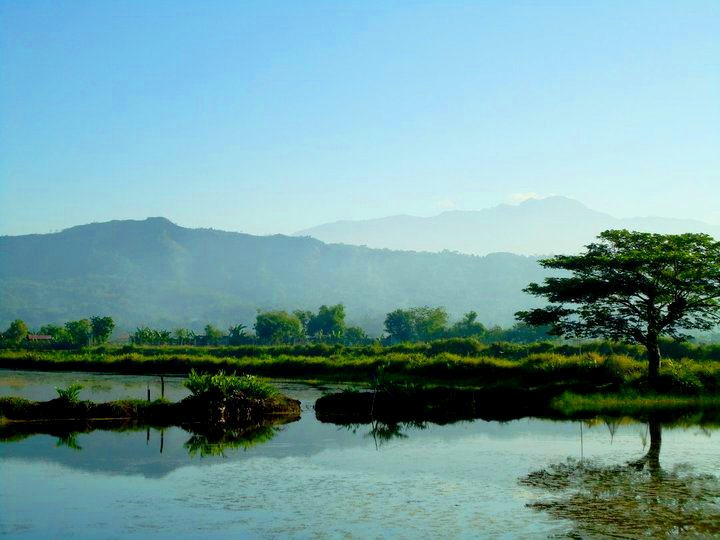
Marchland in Agoo

La Union’s topography is predominantly hilly, gradually rising eastward from its coastal plains. The province’s physiography can be classified into four primary surface configurations: coastal plains, coastal hills, broad interior valleys, and mountain ridges with narrow valleys. These landforms have been shaped by coral alluvium (sand and clay) deposited by flowing water.

The coastal plains of La Union are narrowest near Damortis and Santo Tomas, and widest near Balaoan, extending up to 15 kilometers (9.3 mi) inland. Along the South China Sea, the coastal plains transition sharply to steep ranges, with elevated areas in Santo Tomas, Agoo, Bauang, and Balaoan, and gentler slopes in Bacnotan, San Fernando, and San Juan.

These towns also features mangrove swamps, and the soils in this area are sandy and saline, particularly in southern San Fernando and surrounding areas. Coastal hills in La Union rarely exceed 300 kilometers (190 mi) in elevation, merging with the Cordillera mountain ranges to form narrow valleys. The soils in these areas are primarily heavy loam and clay, which are common in Agoo, Aringay, Santo Tomas, and Rosario, while northern San Fernando is characterized by gravelly, eroded loam.

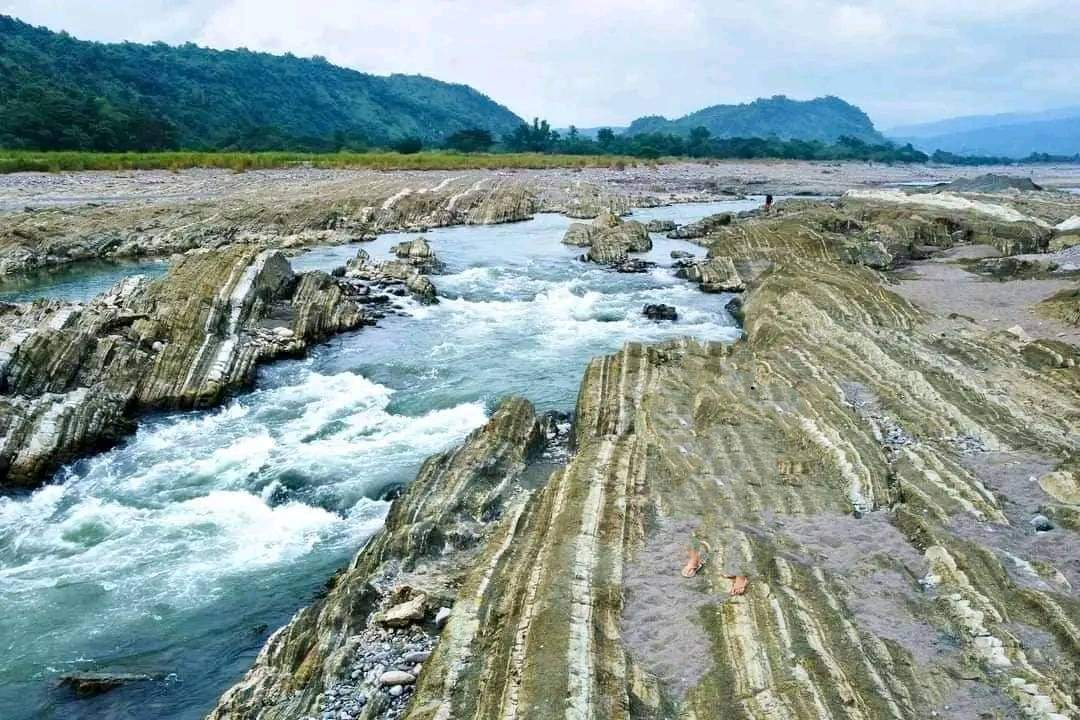
Balili River Rock Formation, Naguilian

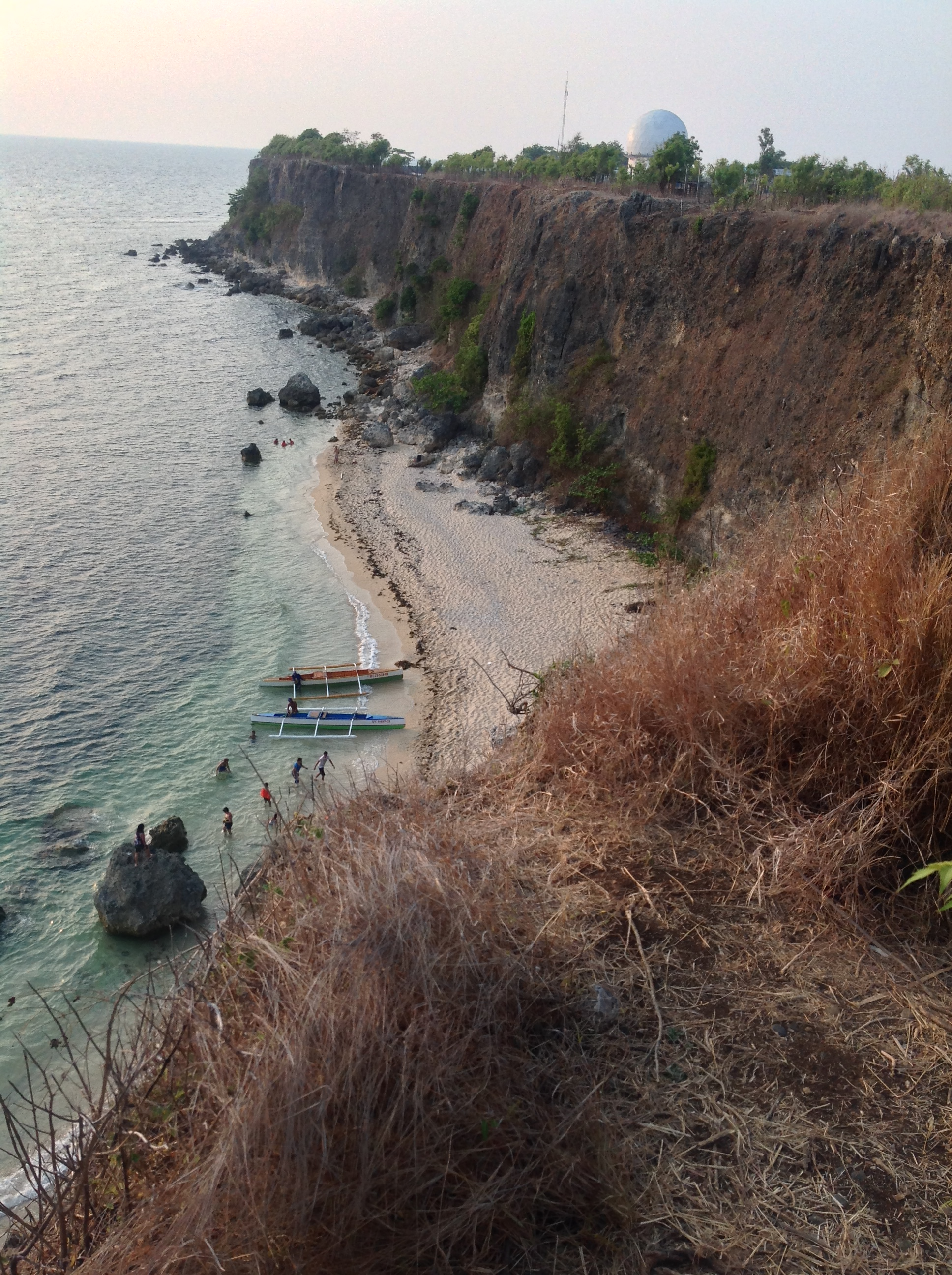
Sea Cliff, San Fernando City

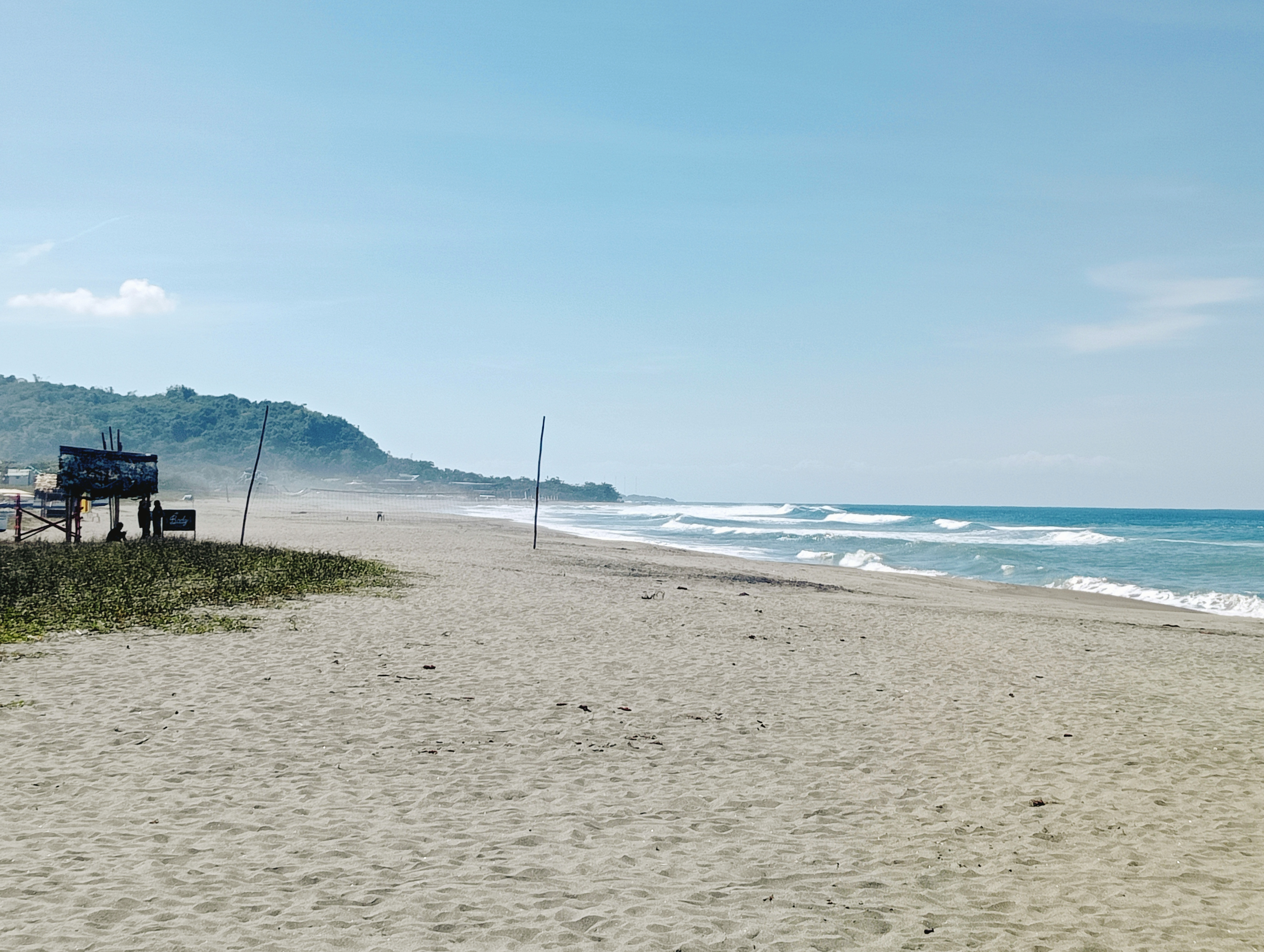
Coastal belt, San Juan

The eastern frontier of the province is predominantly mountainous, dominated by the Gran Cordillera mountain ranges, specifically the Central and Northern Cordillera, which run parallel to the South China Sea coast. The highest peak in the province is located in Bagulin, at an elevation of 1,200 feet, with other elevated areas found in San Gabriel and Burgos. The fertile, fan-shaped interior valleys in San Juan, San Fernando, and Balaoan, formed by river delta sediments, are crucial for agriculture, though they are prone to flooding during heavy rainfall.

Salty-loam and alluvial soils, which are ideal for crops such as rice and tobacco, are prevalent in Naguilian, Aringay, Bauang, Balaoan, and Luna. The eastern mountain ranges, characterized by steep slopes and narrow valleys, are covered with reddish, clayish soils, particularly in Bacnotan, Agoo, San Fernando, San Juan, and Bauang, which are not suitable for agricultural use.

La Union is home to nine valleys—four in the northern part of the province (Bangar, Balaoan, Bacnotan, San Juan) and five in the south (Tubao, Aringay, Santo Tomas, Rosario, Naguilian)—which support agricultural land. These valleys are crossed by narrow, turbulent rivers. Further to the east, elevated plateaus and peaks that rise dramatically.

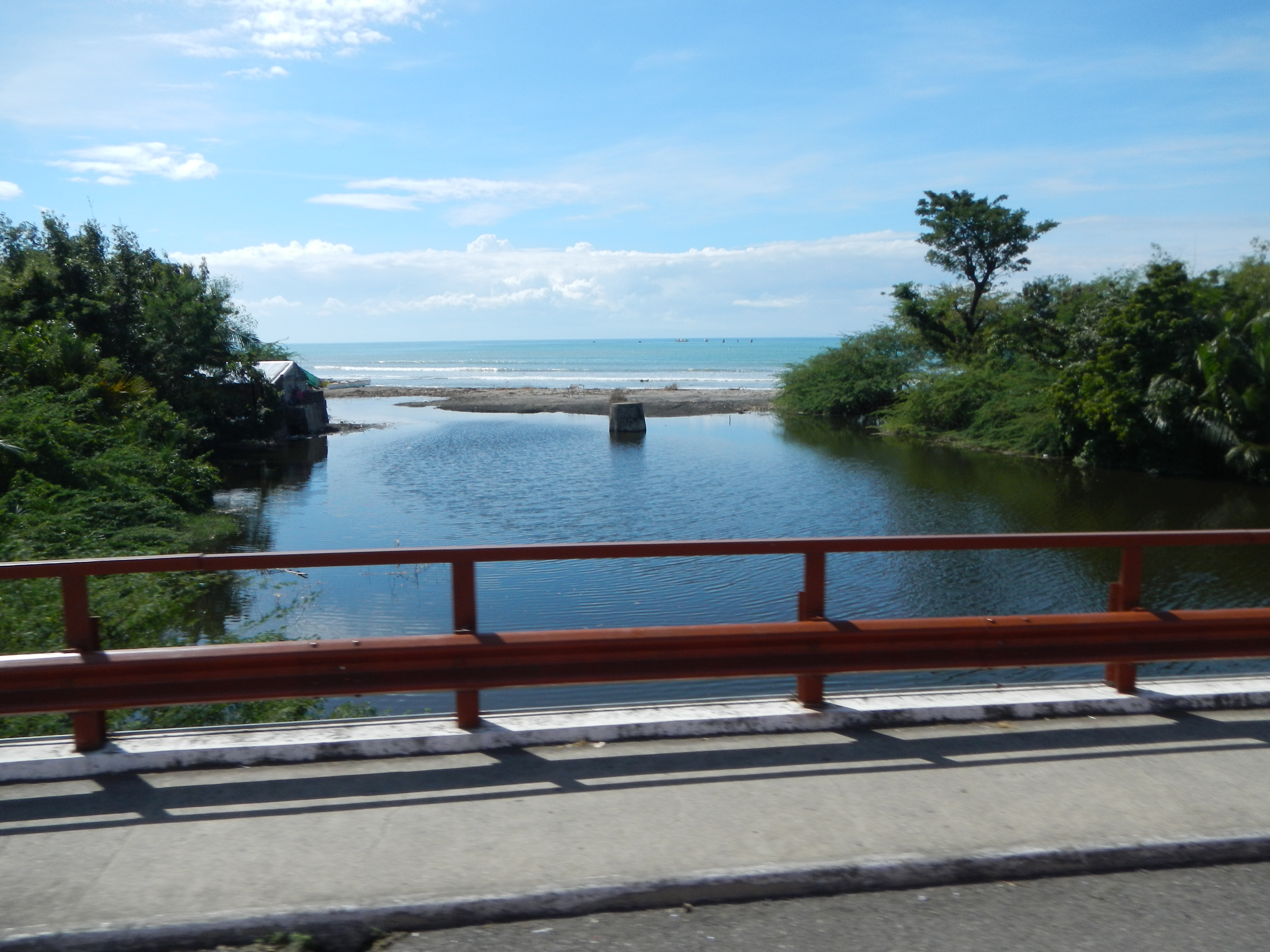
Rabon River, Rosario

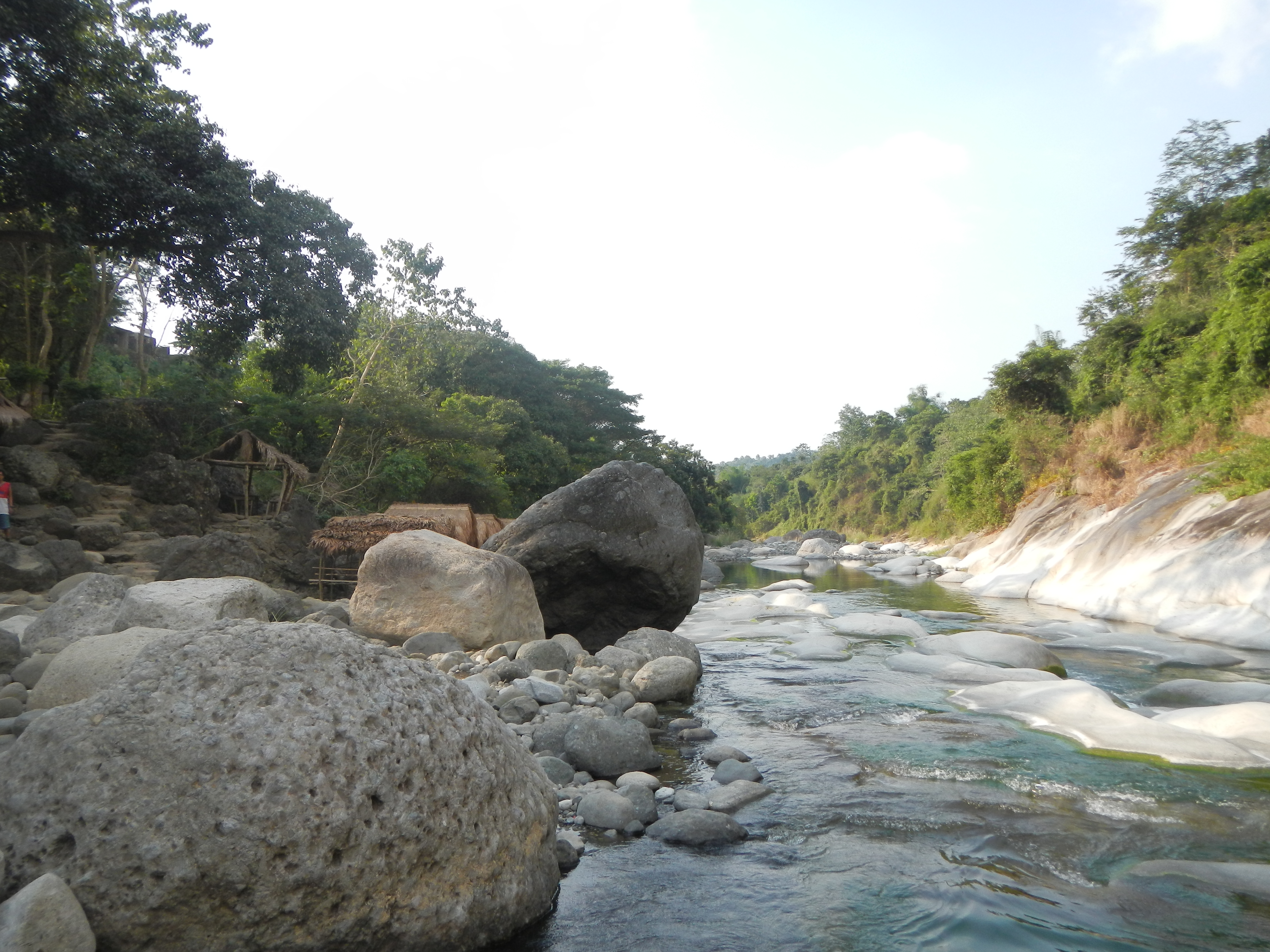
Tapuacan River, Pugo

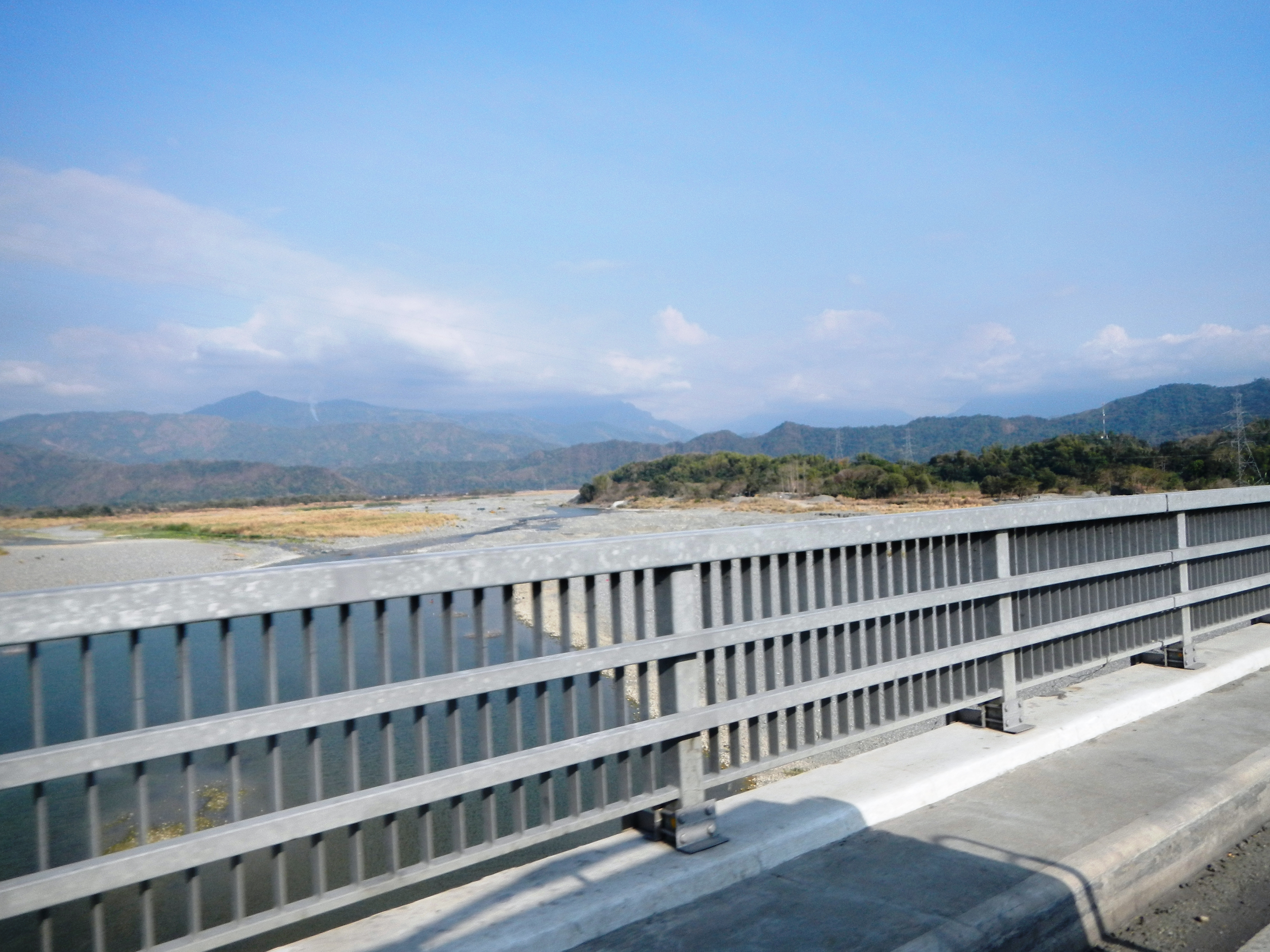
Amburayan River, Sudipen

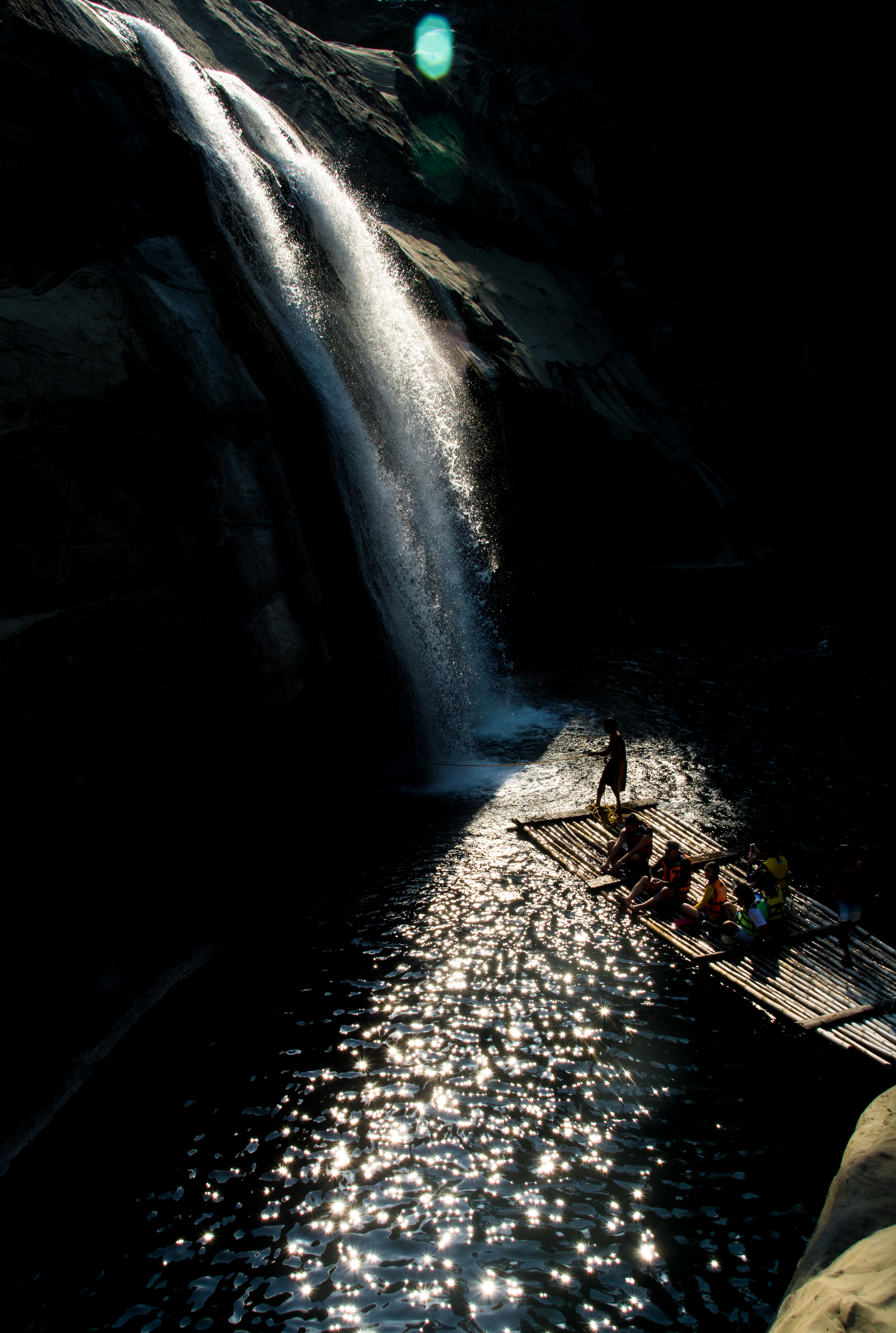
Tangadan Falls, San Gabriel

The province is traversed by eight principal rivers, most of which originate in the Cordillera Central Mountains and flow into the South China Sea and Lingayen Gulf:

- Amburayan River: The largest river in the province, it passes through San Gabriel, Sudipen, and Bangar, marking the northern boundary between Ilocos Sur and La Union before flowing into the South China Sea.
- Bued River: Flows through Pugo and Rosario, draining into the Lingayen Gulf, marking the southern boundary with Pangasinan.
- Aringay River: Class B River Basin with a length of 45 km that originates in Benguet, passes through Pugo, Tubao, and Aringay, and flows into both the South China Sea and Lingayen Gulf.
- Baroro River: A length of 22.2 km that starts in the mountains of San Gabriel, crossing San Gabriel, San Juan, and Bacnotan, and flows into the South China Sea.
- Maluyo River (also known as Bucilac River): Flows through Santol, Balaoan, and Bangar, marking regional boundaries.
- Naguilian-Bauang River (also known as Balili River): Originates in La Trinidad, Benguet, and flows through Bagulin, Naguilian, and Bauang to the South China Sea.
- Maragayap River: Passes through San Gabriel, Balaoan, and Bacnotan, eventually flowing into the South China Sea.
- Darigayos River: Flows from the mountains behind Balaoan to Darigayos Cove, emptying into the South China Sea.

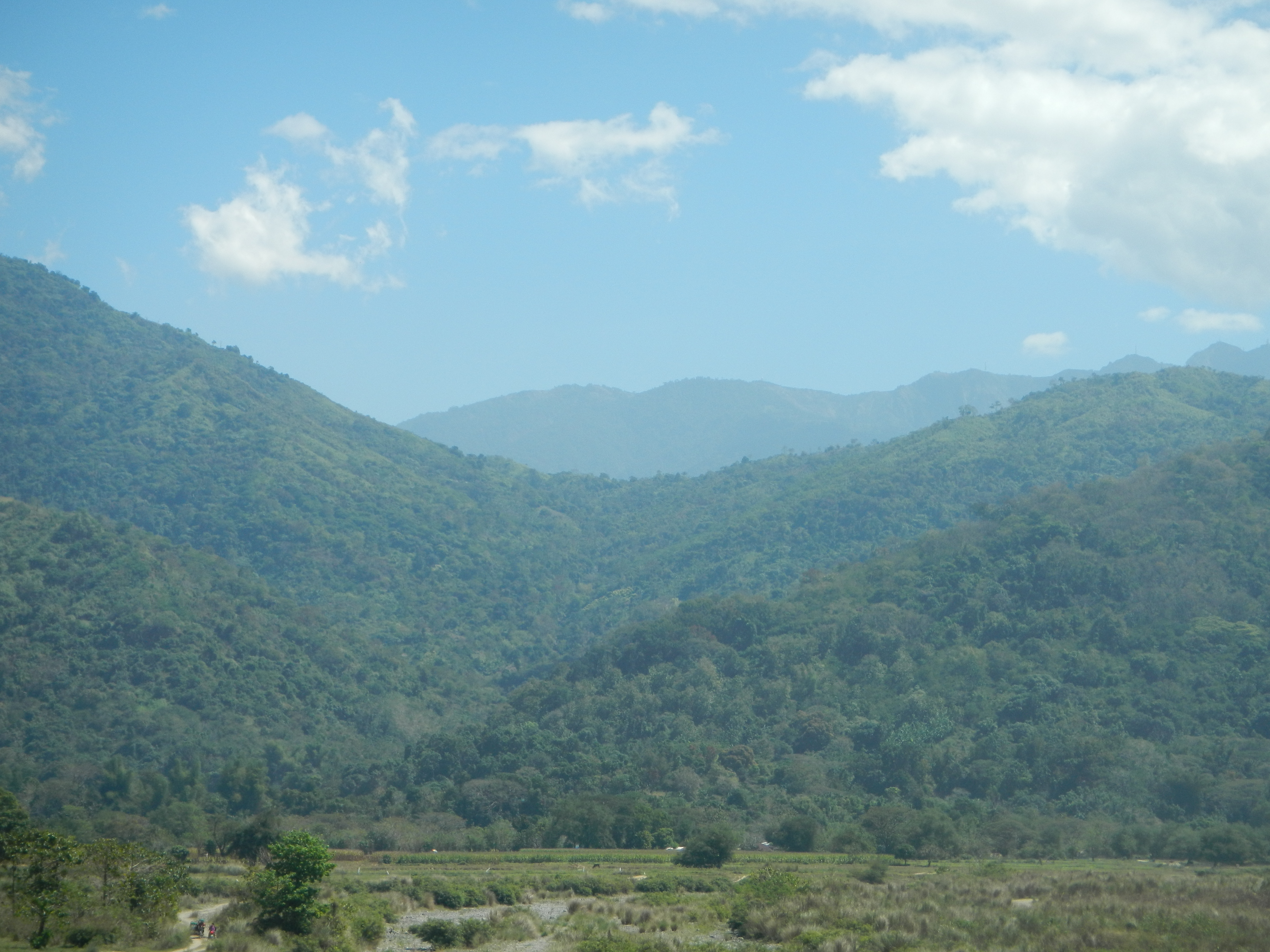
Cordillera Mountains in Tubao

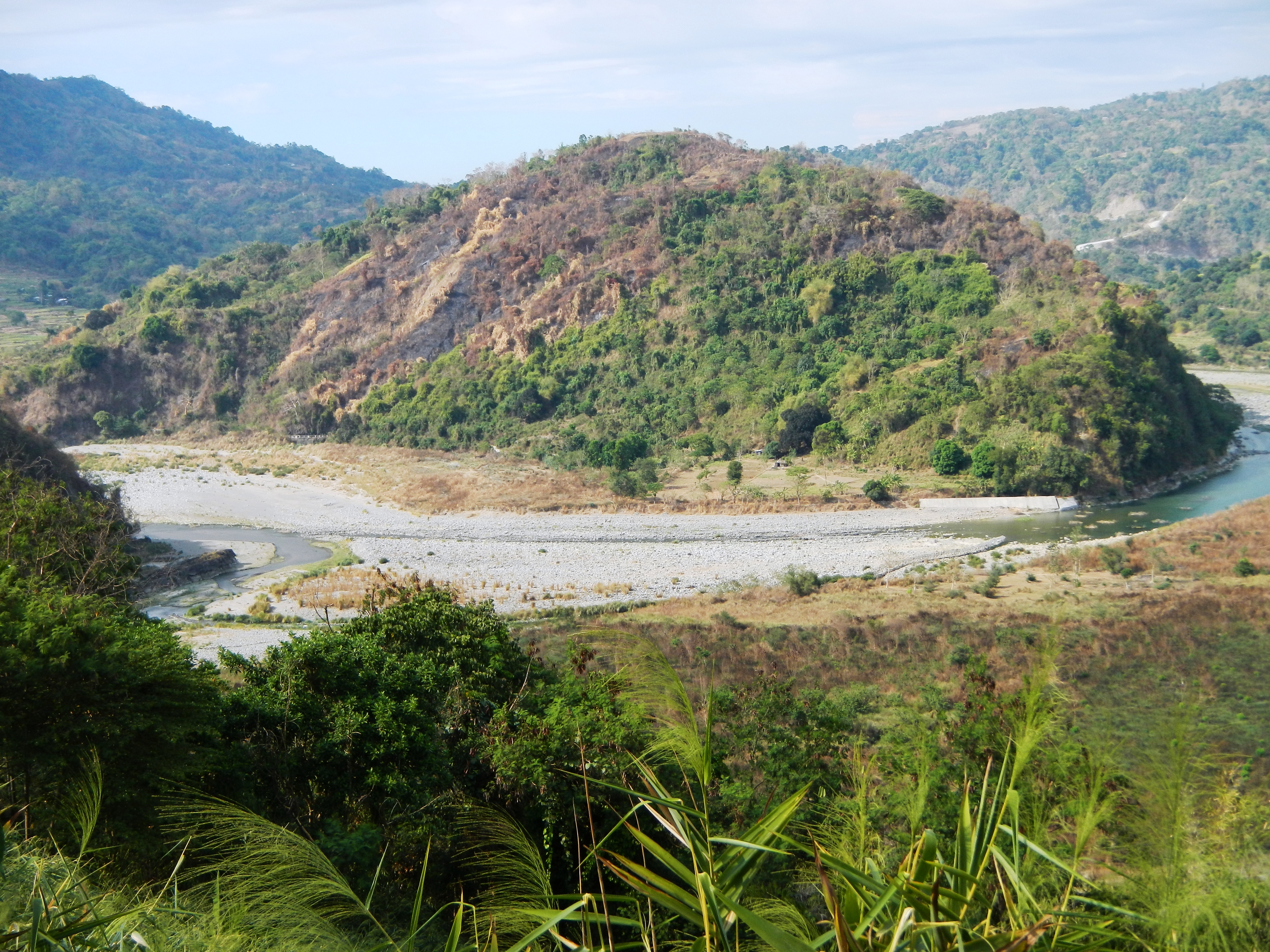
Terrains along Balili River, Bagulin

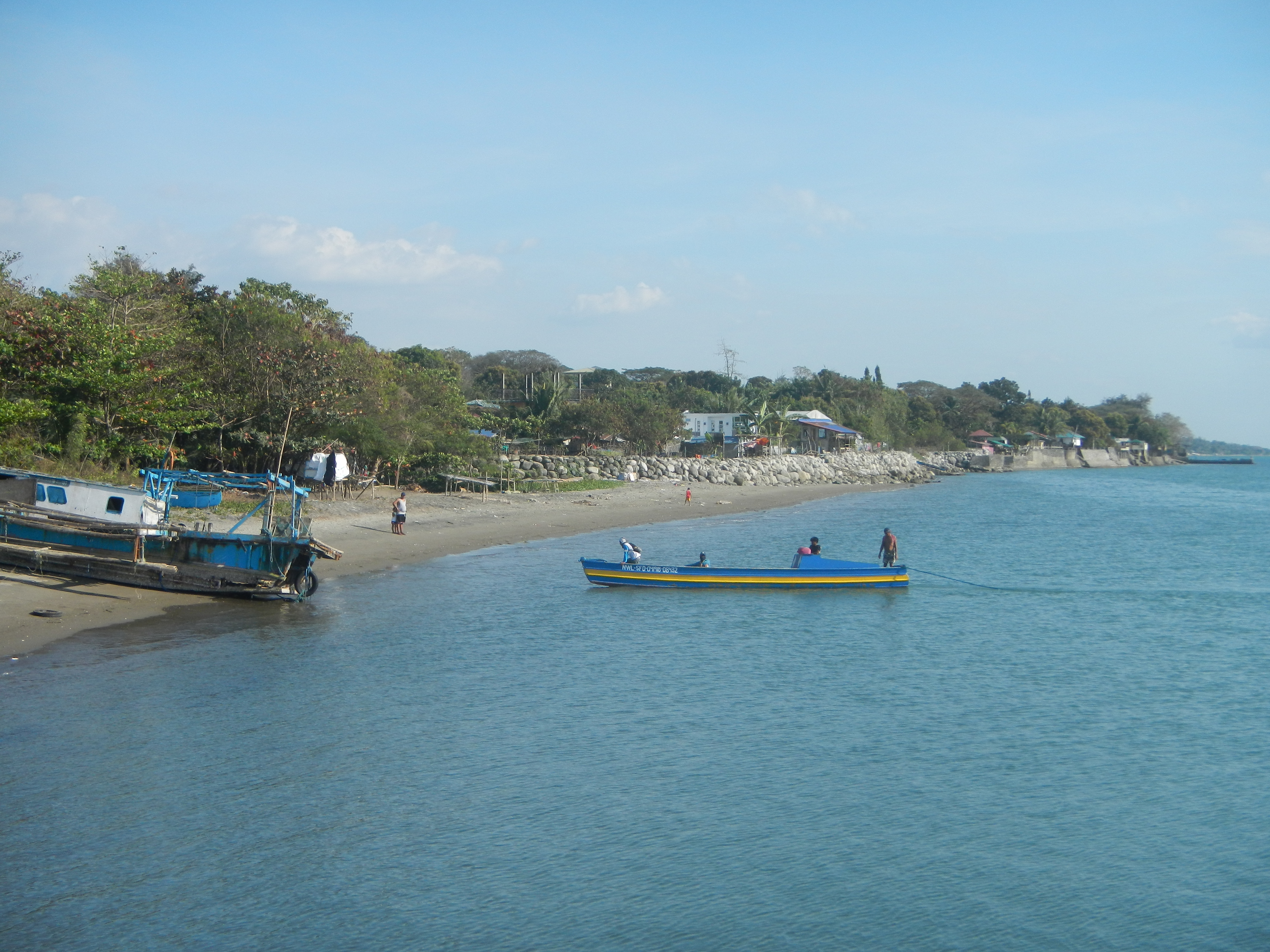
Coastal area in Santo Tomas

La Union’s coastal rim is indented by four bays or coves: San Fernando (at the central point), San Juan in the northeast, Darigayos in the northwest, and Santo Tomas in the southwest.

Land use in La Union is varied. Forests and wooded areas cover 41,240 hectares (27.62%), enhancing its biodiversity. Agriculture dominates, occupying 54,701 hectares (36.64%), while grasslands and shrublands account for 22,834 hectares (15.29%). Urban development takes up 15,555 hectares (10.42%), alongside 14,788 hectares (3.30%) of bare land, and 191 hectares (0.13%) are classified as wetlands.

=== Climate ===
According to Philippine Atmospheric, Geophysical and Astronomical Services Administration (PAGASA), La Union experiences a 1st Climatic Type of the Köppen Climate Classification, which is characterized by two distinct seasons: a dry season from November to April and a wet season from May to October. The Southwest Monsoon (SWM) brings heavy rainfall during the wet season, while the Northeast Monsoon (NEM) causes relatively dry conditions as it passes over the Cordillera Mountains. Rainfall is not evenly distributed throughout the year, with the peak rainfall occurring from July to September.

La Union is also affected by tropical cyclones, with 85 such weather systems recorded between 1948 and 2009, including one super typhoon. These storms, which occur most frequently from July to October, have adverse effects on tourism, agriculture, and infrastructure. During strong typhoons, businesses often close, power outages are common, transportation becomes limited, and crops suffer damage, reducing agricultural production.

Climate data for Province of La Union
Month	Jan	Feb	Mar	Apr	May	Jun	Jul	Aug	Sep	Oct	Nov	Dec	Year
Mean daily maximum °C (°F)	31 (88)	31 (88)	33 (91)	33 (91)	32 (90)	31 (88)	30 (86)	30 (86)	30 (86)	31 (88)	31 (88)	31 (88)	31 (88)
Mean daily minimum °C (°F)	21 (70)	22 (72)	23 (73)	25 (77)	26 (79)	26 (79)	26 (79)	26 (79)	25 (77)	24 (75)	23 (73)	22 (72)	24 (75)
Average precipitation mm (inches)	42 (1.7)	48 (1.9)	74 (2.9)	110 (4.3)	269 (10.6)	275 (10.8)	362 (14.3)	325 (12.8)	330 (13.0)	306 (12.0)	126 (5.0)	61 (2.4)	2,328 (91.7)
Average rainy days	11.2	12.0	17.1	21.2	27.1	26.8	28.1	27.0	26.0	24.5	17.7	12.4	251.1
Source: Meteoblue (modeled/calculated data, not measured locally)

=== Administrative Divisions ===
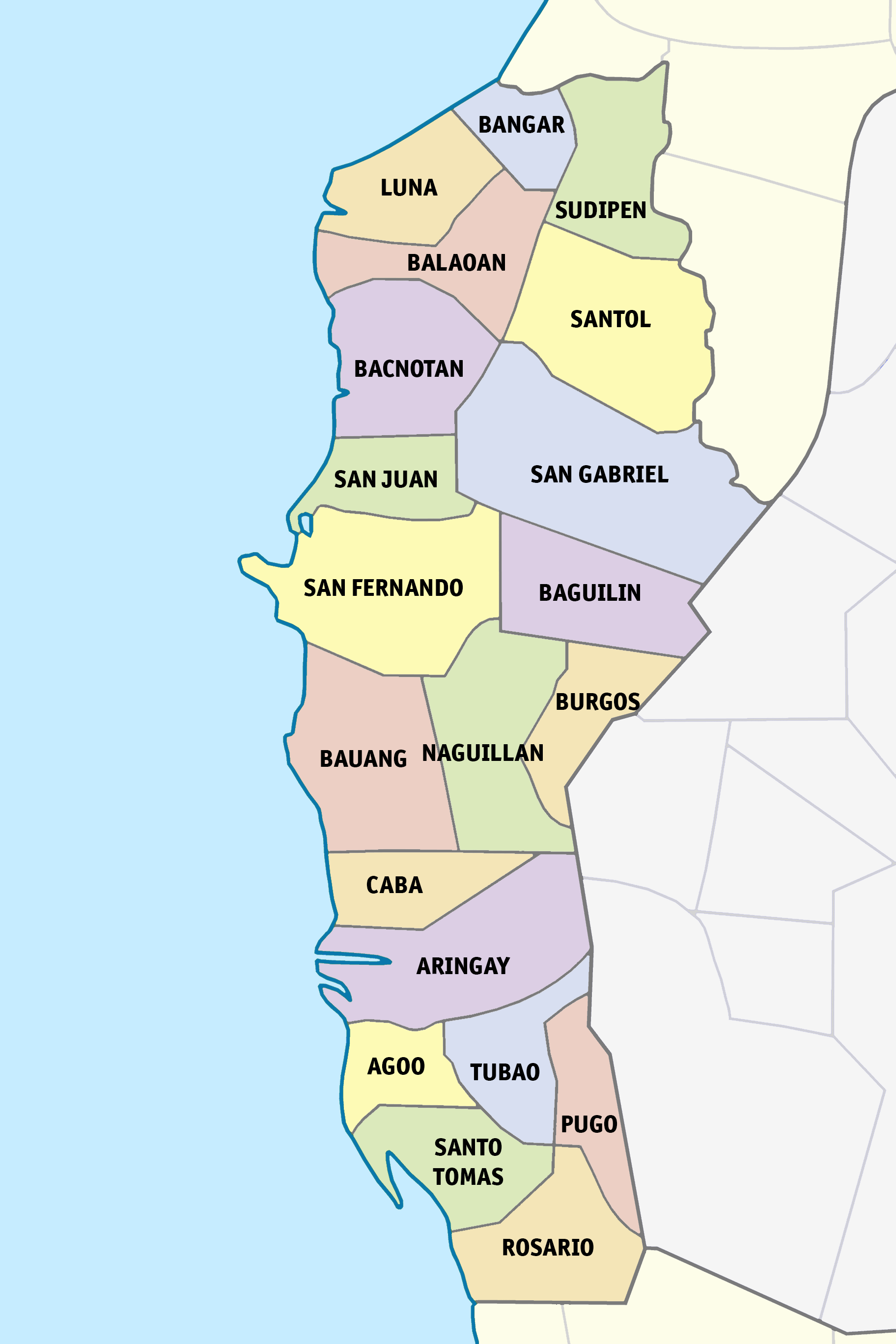
Political map of La Union

La Union comprises 19 municipalities and 1 component city, all of which are organized into two legislative districts. The First Congressional District consists of 8 municipalities and 1 city, while the Second Congressional District consists of 11 municipalities.

- † Provincial capital and component city
- Municipality

City or municipality		District	Population			±% p.a.	Area		Density		Barangay	Coordinates^{[A]}
			(2020)		(2015)		km^{2}	sq mi	/km^{2}	/sq mi		
Agoo		2nd	8.0%	66,028	63,692	0.69%	52.84	20.40	1,200	3,100	49	16°19′20″N 120°21′58″E
Aringay		2nd	6.1%	50,380	47,458	1.14%	84.54	32.64	600	1,600	24	16°23′45″N 120°21′19″E
Bacnotan		1st	5.4%	44,388	42,078	1.02%	78.18	30.19	570	1,500	47	16°43′18″N 120°20′59″E
Bagulin		2nd	1.8%	14,428	13,456	1.34%	107.33	41.44	130	340	10	16°36′27″N 120°26′15″E
Balaoan		1st	4.9%	40,339	39,188	0.55%	68.70	26.53	590	1,500	36	16°49′15″N 120°24′09″E
Bangar		1st	4.6%	38,041	35,947	1.08%	37.36	14.42	1,000	2,600	33	16°53′37″N 120°25′22″E
Bauang		2nd	9.5%	78,449	75,032	0.85%	73.15	28.24	1,100	2,800	39	16°31′35″N 120°19′45″E
Burgos		2nd	1.1%	9,006	8,067	2.12%	70.80	27.34	130	340	12	16°31′11″N 120°26′36″E
Caba		2nd	2.8%	23,119	22,039	0.92%	46.31	17.88	500	1,300	17	16°25′52″N 120°20′38″E
Luna		1st	4.5%	37,318	35,802	0.79%	42.90	16.56	870	2,300	40	16°51′10″N 120°22′35″E
Naguilian		2nd	6.3%	52,189	54,221	−0.72%	104.60	40.39	500	1,300	37	16°31′56″N 120°23′45″E
Pugo		2nd	2.4%	19,337	19,690	−0.34%	62.84	24.26	310	800	14	16°19′13″N 120°28′02″E
Rosario		2nd	7.3%	60,278	55,458	1.60%	73.98	28.56	810	2,100	33	16°13′46″N 120°29′16″E
San Fernando	†	1st	15.3%	125,640	121,812	0.59%	102.72	39.66	1,200	3,100	59	16°36′52″N 120°18′57″E
San Gabriel		1st	2.3%	18,943	18,172	0.79%	129.87	50.14	150	390	15	16°40′27″N 120°24′04″E
San Juan		1st	4.9%	40,507	37,188	1.64%	57.12	22.05	710	1,800	41	16°40′12″N 120°20′14″E
Santo Tomas		2nd	5.0%	40,846	39,092	0.84%	64.00	24.71	640	1,700	24	16°17′04″N 120°23′19″E
Santol		1st	1.7%	14,166	12,476	2.45%	93.70	36.18	150	390	11	16°46′22″N 120°27′35″E
Sudipen		1st	2.1%	17,187	17,056	0.15%	97.59	37.68	180	470	17	16°54′27″N 120°27′52″E
Tubao		2nd	3.9%	31,763	28,729	1.93%	50.75	19.59	630	1,600	18	16°20′49″N 120°24′45″E
Total				822,352	786,653	0.85%	1,499.28	578.88	550	1,400	576	(see GeoGroup box)
1. Coordinates mark the city/town center, and are sortable by latitude.

=== Barangays ===
La Union consists of 576 barangays, which are spread across its 19 municipalities and 1 city. According to the 2020 census, the barangay with the highest population is Sevilla, located in the City of San Fernando, boasting a population of 11,316. When cities are not taken into account, Central East (Poblacion) in the municipality of Bauang ranks as the most populous barangay, with 4,249 residents. In contrast, Caggao in Bangar has the smallest population, totaling just 192 inhabitants.

== Conservation ==
=== Protected areas ===
The Philippines' National Integrated Protected Areas System identifies three protected areas in the province of La Union. These are:

- The Agoo-Damortis Protected Landscape and Seascape (10,774.68 hectares) located across the municipalities of Agoo, Sto. Tomas, and Rosario;
- The Naguilian Watershed Forest Reserve (90 hectares) in Naguilian; and
- the Marcos Highway Watershed Forest Reserve (15,038 hectares) located in across the municipalities of Agoo, Tubao, Rosario, Pugo, Santo Tomas, and Aringay.

Numerous other protected areas have been established locally through various municipal ordinances, among the more notable of which are the Bauang-Bakawan Eco-Tourism Park in Bauang, the Urbiztondo Fish Sanctuary in San Juan, La Union, the Aringay Marine Protected Area in Aringay, La Union, and the Dalumpinas Oeste Pawikan Conservation Center in San Fernando, La Union.

=== Endangered and vulnerable species and conservation efforts ===
La Union is well known for being a preferred birthing ground of three species of Sea Turtles, locally known as "Pawikan": the Green sea turtle; the critically endangered Hawksbill sea turtle; and the Olive Ridley sea turtle which is classified as vulnerable. In 2011, the local government head of Barangay Dalumpinas Oeste in San Fernando, La Union spearheaded a Conservation Program to protect the increasing number of Turtle nests found on their coast.

La Union's varied geography serves as home to a wide range of bird species, among the largest of which are the Brahminy kite, and Philippine serpent eagle. Among the endangered bird species who stay in the province are the Java sparrow.

Endangered tree species which have been identified in La Union include the Molave (Vitex parviflora) while vulnerable species include the Dau (Dracontomelon dao) and “Pammittaogen” (Calophyllum pentapetalum).

== Demographics ==
=== Population ===
According to the 2020 census conducted by the Philippine Census of Population and Housing, La Union had a population of 822,352, with a population density of 550 people per square kilometer (1,400 per square mile). This is an increase of 35,699 persons over the total population of 786,653 persons in 2015 Census of Population. The household population was nearly evenly distributed, with 50.6% male (414,860) and 49.4% female (405,480).

Population census of La Union

Year	Pop.	±% p.a.
1903	137,847	—
1918	178,400	+1.73%
1939	207,701	+0.73%
1948	237,340	+1.49%
1960	293,330	+1.78%
1970	373,682	+2.45%
1975	414,635	+2.11%
1980	452,578	+1.77%

Year	Pop.	±% p.a.
1990	548,742	+1.95%
1995	597,442	+1.61%
2000	657,945	+2.09%
2007	720,972	+1.27%
2010	741,906	+1.05%
2015	786,653	+1.12%
2020	822,352	+0.94%
2024	825,072	+0.08%

Source: Philippine Statistics Authority

San Fernando is the most populous area in La Union, with 125,640 residents (15.28% of the province's total population), followed by Bauang (78,449), Agoo (66,028), Rosario (60,278), and Naguilian (52,189). Conversely, Burgos is the least populous municipality with 9,006 residents, followed by Santol (14,166), Bagulin (14,428), Sudipen (17,187), and San Gabriel (18,943).

Santol recorded the fastest population growth between 2015 and 2020, with an annual rate of 2.71%, followed by Burgos (2.34%), Tubao (2.13%), San Juan (1.81%), and Rosario (1.77%). In terms of population density, Agoo was the most densely populated municipality, with 1,250 persons per square kilometer, while Burgos had the lowest density at 127 persons per square kilometer.

Age distribution reveals that 26.3% of the population were young dependents (under 15 years), 66.1% were of working age (15–64 years), and 7.6% were elderly (65 years and older). Males slightly outnumbered females in younger age groups, while females were more numerous among the elderly, reflecting higher life expectancy for women. The overall sex ratio was 102 males per 100 females, with variations across age groups: 108 males per 100 females among those under 15, 105 in the working-age population, and 70 among the elderly.

The median age in La Union was 28.5 years. Senior citizens (60 years and older) comprised 11.5% of the population, 56.4% of whom were women. As of 2012, La Union had the longest life expectancy in the Philippines at 78.3 years.

=== Religion ===
According to the 2020 census on religious affiliation in the Ilocos Region, the majority of La Union's household population identifies as Christian, with Roman Catholics comprising 69.5% (695,867 individuals). Iglesia ni Cristo represents a significant minority with 23,374 members, while Islam accounts for 0.19% of the population (1,932 adherents). Buddhism, though present in smaller numbers, constitutes 0.25% or 163 of the population.

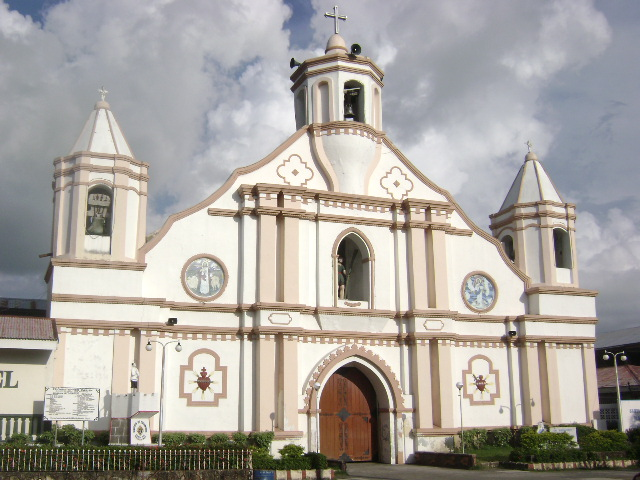
Christopher Parish Church, Bangar

Ma-Cho Taoist Temple, San Fernando City

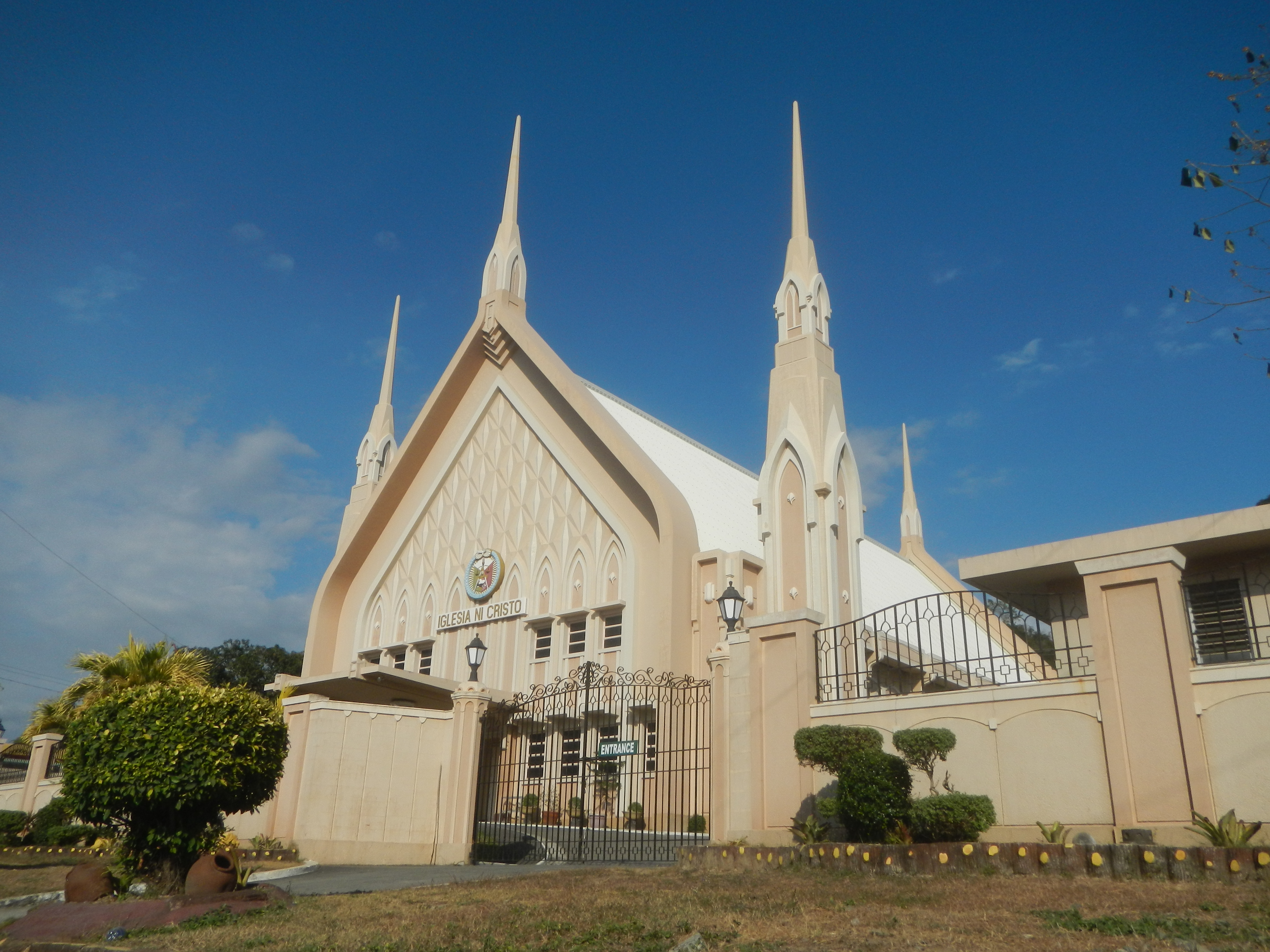
Iglesia ni Cristo Church, Aringay

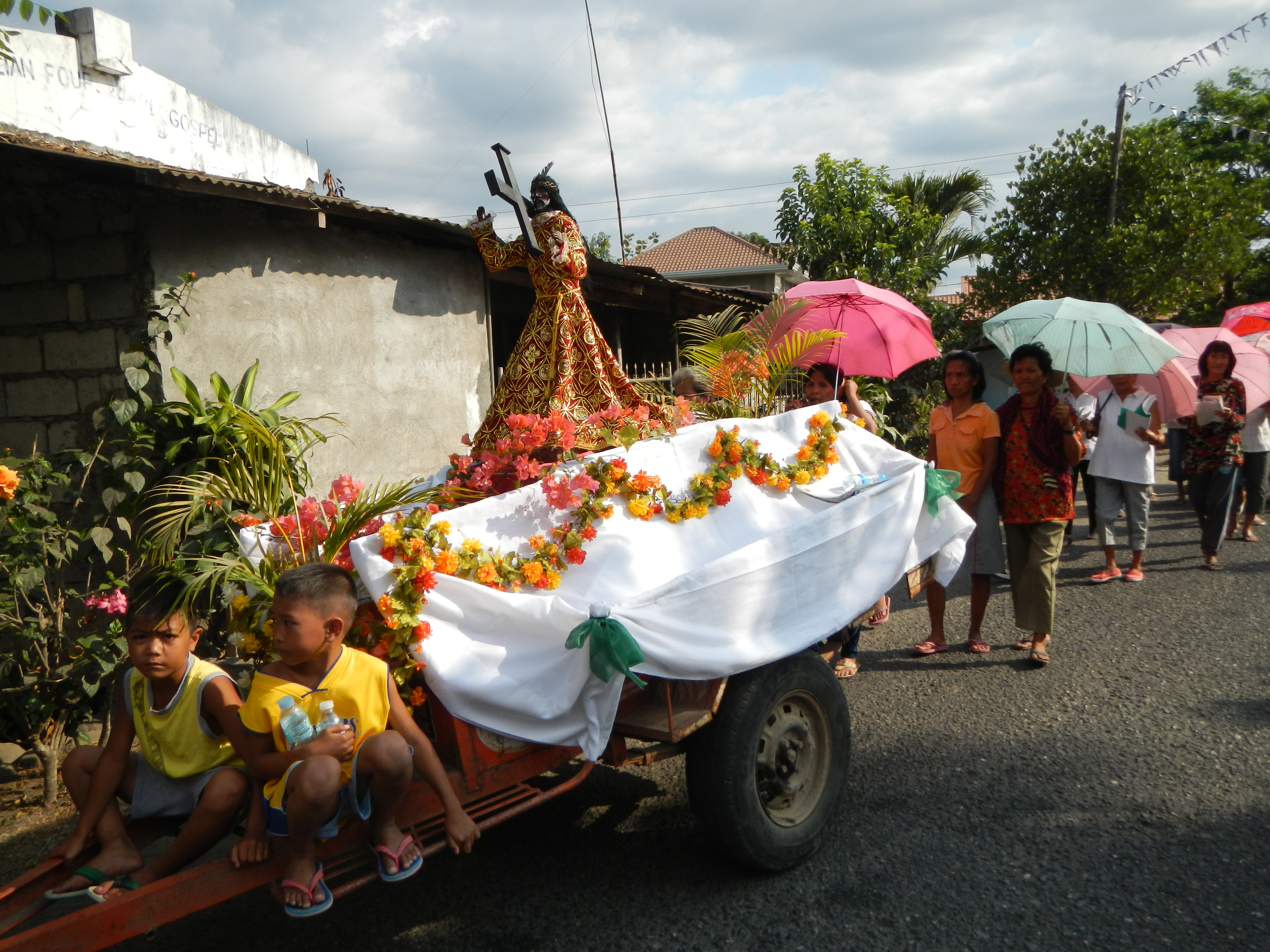
Black Nazarene devotees, Naguilian

In addition to Roman Catholicism and Iglesia ni Cristo, the province is home to a range of Christian denominations, including Protestantism, the Philippine Independent Church (Aglipayan), Jehovah’s Witnesses, the Pentecostal Church of God Asia Mission, Bible Baptist Church, The Church of Jesus Christ of Latter-day Saints, and the Church of Christ, among others. Non-Christian religions such as Taoism and Hinduism are also practiced by a small portion of the population, reflecting the province’s cultural diversity and historical influences from trade and migration.

=== Ethnicity ===
Historically, La Union has been home to several ethnolinguistic groups, including the Ilocanos, Pangasinan, and Cordillerans (Igorot). The Cordillerans primarily consist of the Ibaloi, Kankanaey, and the Bago, also known as Bago-Igorot. The Bago are a highland indigenous people referred to as new Christian converts during Spanish colonization in the province.

Ethnicity in La Union
1. Ilocano (81.9%)
2. Kankanaey (5.17%)
3. Bago (3.01%)
4. Pangasinan (1.25%)
5. Ibaloi (1.11%)
6. Others (7.58%)

Ethnically, La Union is predominantly Ilocano, according to a 2020 report by the Philippine Statistics Authority. The Ilocano ethnic group accounts for 673,312 or 81.88% of the population. In the southwestern part of the province, there are 10,319 Pangasinan people. Indigenous communities, including the Kankanaey (42,552), Bago (24,757), and Ibaloi (9,107), reside in the municipalities of Sudipen, Santol, San Gabriel, Bacnotan, Tubao, Pugo, Bagulin, and Burgos.

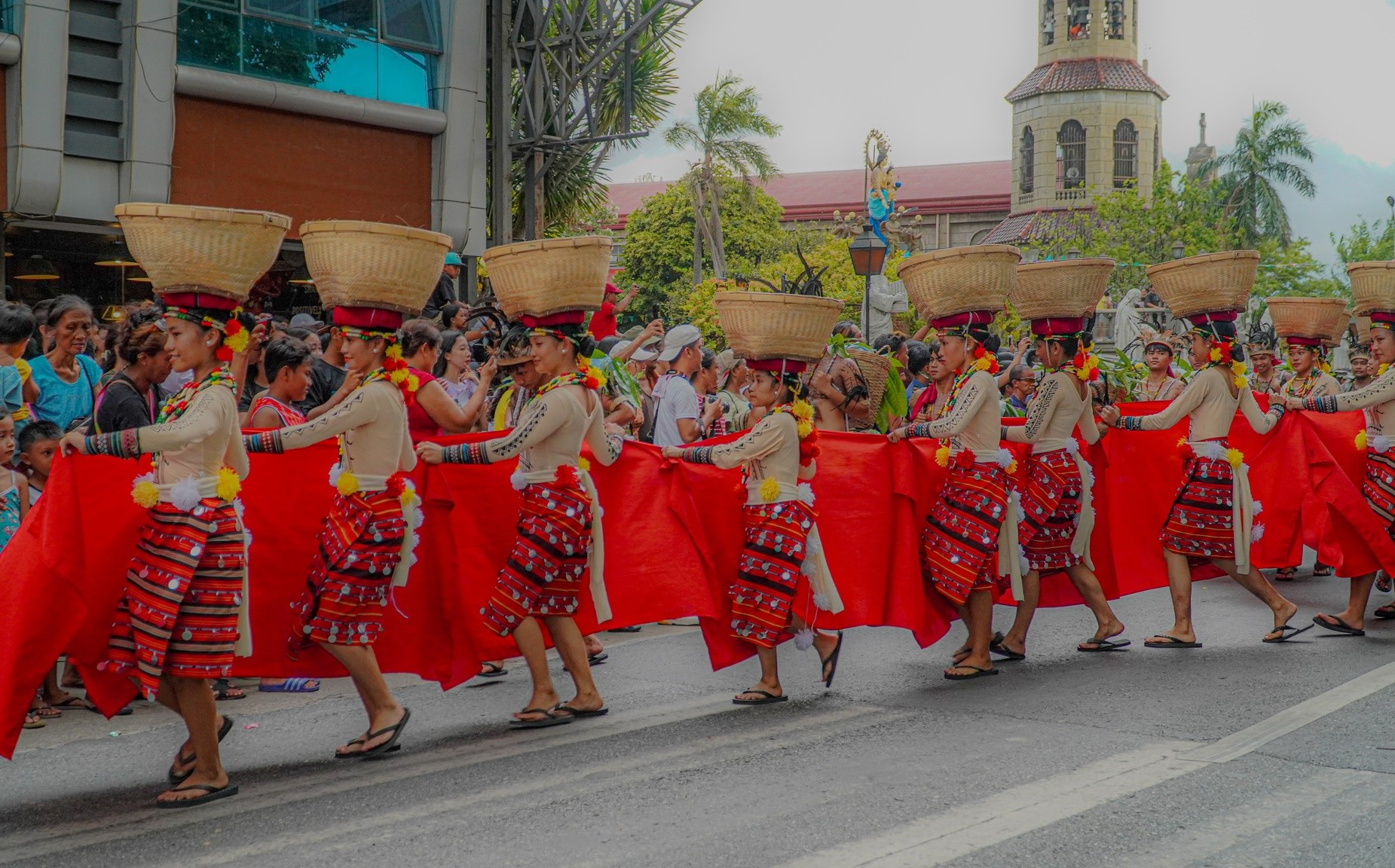
Cordilleran street dancers at the Dinengdeng Festival in Agoo

In Bagulin alone, 85% of the population, or 11,539 individuals, belong to indigenous groups. In Pugo, the majority of indigenous residents are from the Bago people. These communities have faced displacement, such as the eviction from the Mount Shontoug area in Pugo during the construction of the Marcos bust. Southern La Union, particularly Agoo, Santo Tomas, and Rosario, was historically ethnically Pangasinan; by the 16th century, migration from northern La Union and Ilocos, as recorded by Fray Andrés Carro in 1792, resulted in the area becoming predominantly Ilocano-inhabited and ethnically Ilocanized Pangasinenses.

Other ethnic groups in La Union include 23,518 Tagalog people and 10,025 Bisaya or Binisaya people, 4,043 Bicolano people, 2,410 Kapampangan people, 2,383 Hiligaynon (Ilonggo) people, 2,311 Ifugao people, 1,717 Itneg (Tingguian) people, 1,586 Waray people, 1,319 Cebuano, 1,181 Maranao, people as well as foreign nationals such as 473 Chinese, 410 Indian, and 142 American, contributing to the province's cultural diversity.

=== Language ===
Languages Spoken (2020)
Language	Speakers
Ilocano	673,312
Kankanaey	42,552
Bago	24,757
Tagalog	23,518
Pangasinan	10,319
Ibaloi	9,107
Others	38,787

Iloco, or Iloko, is the primary language spoken in La Union, with the Abagatan (Southern) dialect as its regional variation. In 2012, Iloco was officially recognized as the language of La Union through Provincial Ordinance No. 026-2012, known as the Iloco Code. Pangasinan is also spoken in the southern part of the province, particularly near the border with Pangasinan. Meanwhile, Kankanaey and Ibaloi are spoken by the Cordilleran communities residing in the highland areas of La Union.

Historically, in 1884, Governor Federico Francia issued an espediente (report) on the dialectos que hablan (dialects spoken) in La Union. The report noted that most umilis (townspeople) spoke Ilocano and Pangasinan, with Santo Tomas and Rosario being the only towns where both languages were spoken due to their proximity to Pangasinan. The remaining 11 towns predominantly spoke Iloco, excluding the scattered Igorrotes communities in rancherías. Up to the end of Hispanic rule, Ilocano remained the predominant lingua franca of La Union.

== Economy ==
Poverty incidence of La Union (%)

Source: Philippine Statistics Authority

La Union’s economy is driven by three primary sectors: agriculture, industry, and services. The service sector plays a dominant role, comprising 81.28% of all business establishments, while industry contributes 17.21% and agriculture makes up 1.51%. In 2022, La Union emerged as the second fastest-growing economy in the Ilocos Region, with a growth rate of 7.7%.

According to preliminary estimates from the 2019 Provincial Human Development Index by the Philippine Statistics Authority (PSA), La Union scored 0.76, indicating a high level of development and rank as top 9 in the Philippines. The province’s Gross Domestic Product (GDP) in 2022 was valued at ₱118.60 billion, representing an 18.1% share of the region’s total economy.

La Union ranked second in terms of per capita GDP, which was recorded at ₱140,840 and ₱124,580 over two different measures. However, the 2021 data from the PSA showed an increase in poverty incidence, with 13.90% of the population and 10.70% of families living below the poverty line, up from 5.20% and 3.70% in 2018, respectively.

=== Agriculture ===
Crop Production

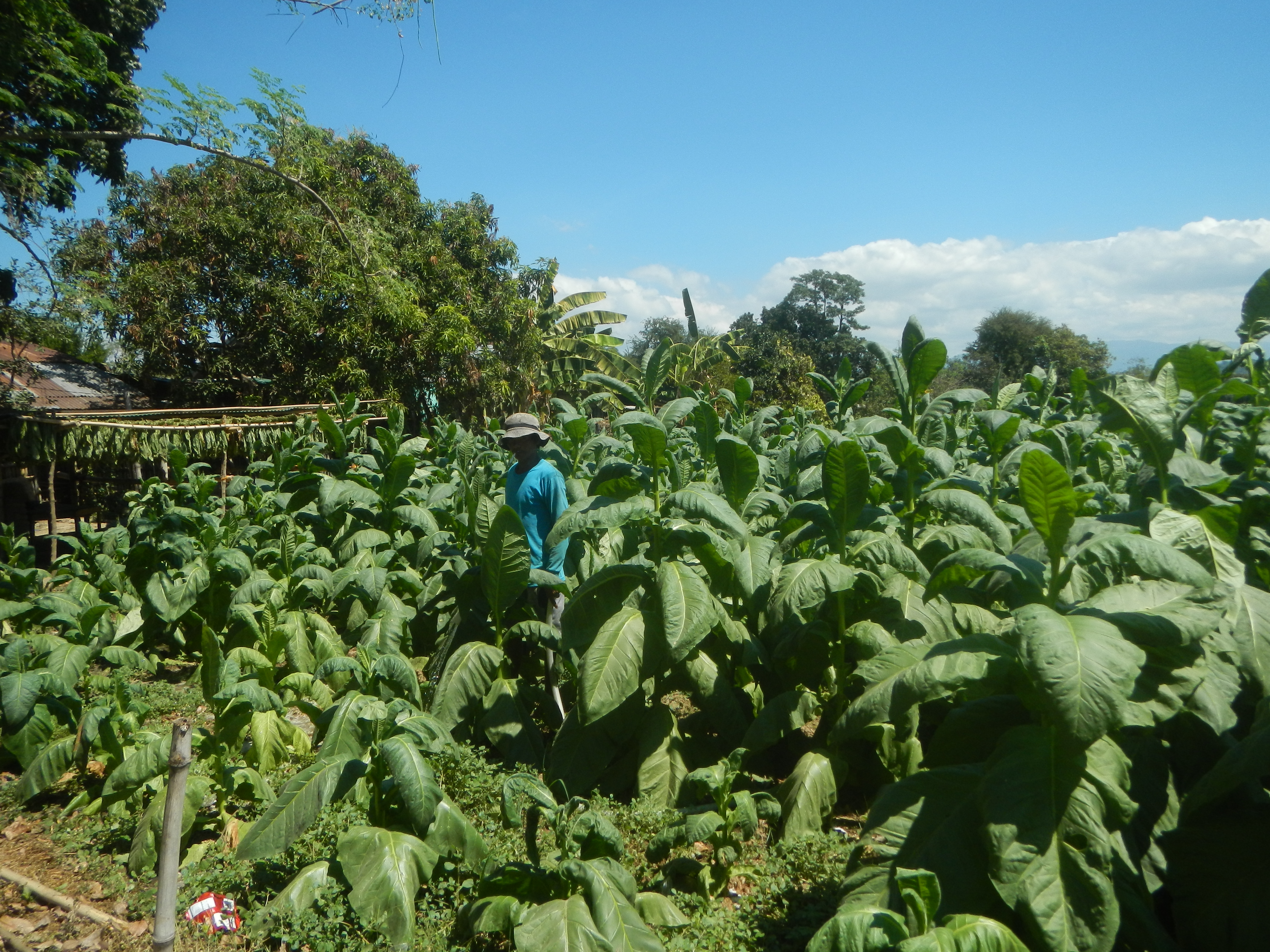
Tobacco farm in Caba

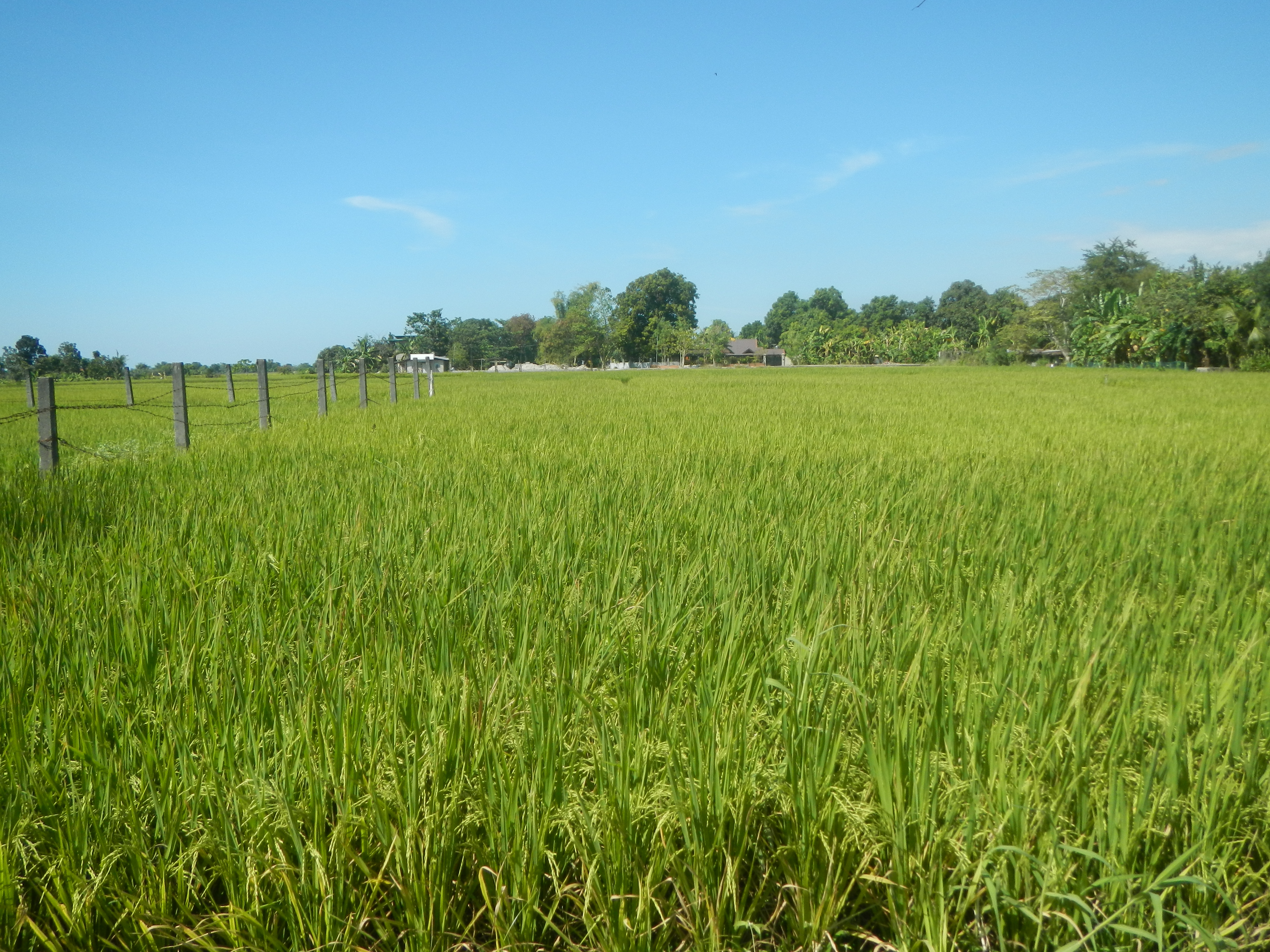
Paddy fields in Agoo

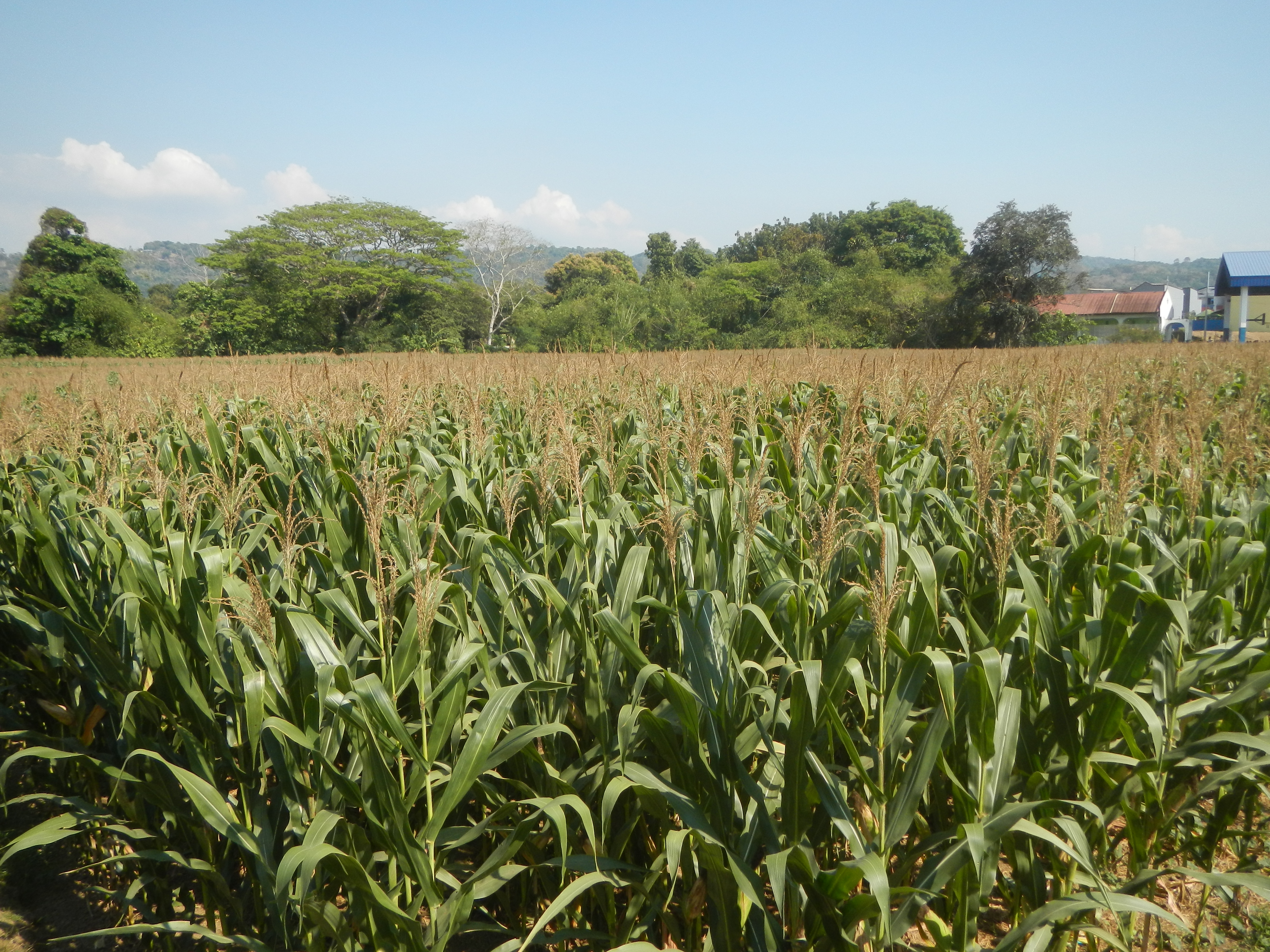
Maize field in City of San Fernando

Agriculture, particularly crop production, remains vital to La Union's economy and its city and municipalities. Major crops include rice (palay), corn, tobacco, sugarcane, root crops, legumes, fruits, and a variety of lowland and highland vegetables.

In 2024, the province recorded a palay production of 127,825 metric tons, equivalent to a 137% rice sufficiency level. This figure was lower than the 173,891.55 metric tons produced in 2023, which represented a 1.53% increase from the 171,276.53 metric tons recorded in 2022.

San Juan registered the highest rice production in 2024 with 11,610 metric tons, followed by Agoo (10,778), Bangar (9,928), Luna (9,883), and Bauang (8,683). In terms of rice sufficiency, San Juan posted the highest level at 264%, while Burgos (259%), San Gabriel (246%), Luna (245%), and Bangar (241%) also achieved significant production surpluses.

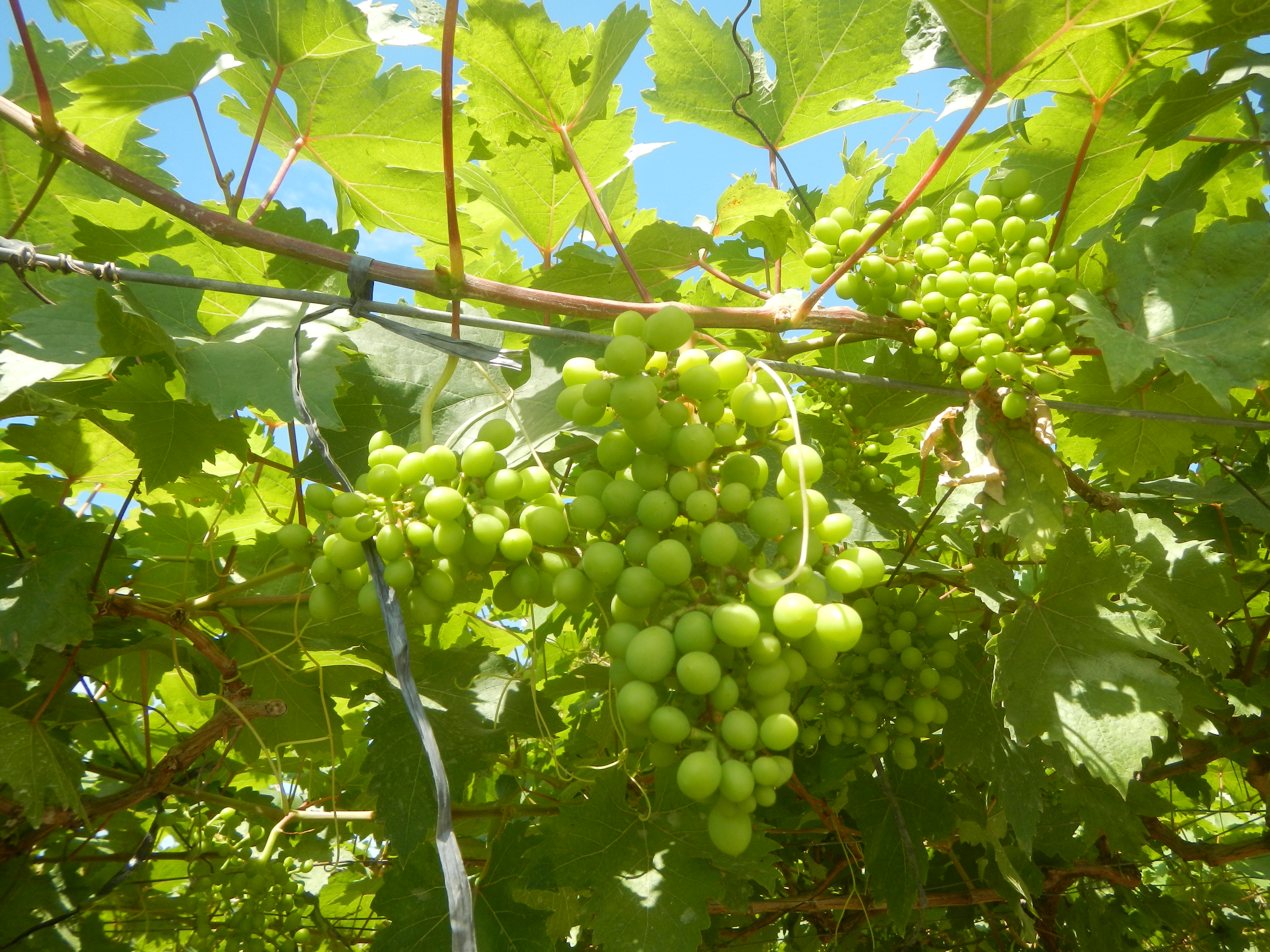
Vineyard Farm in Caba

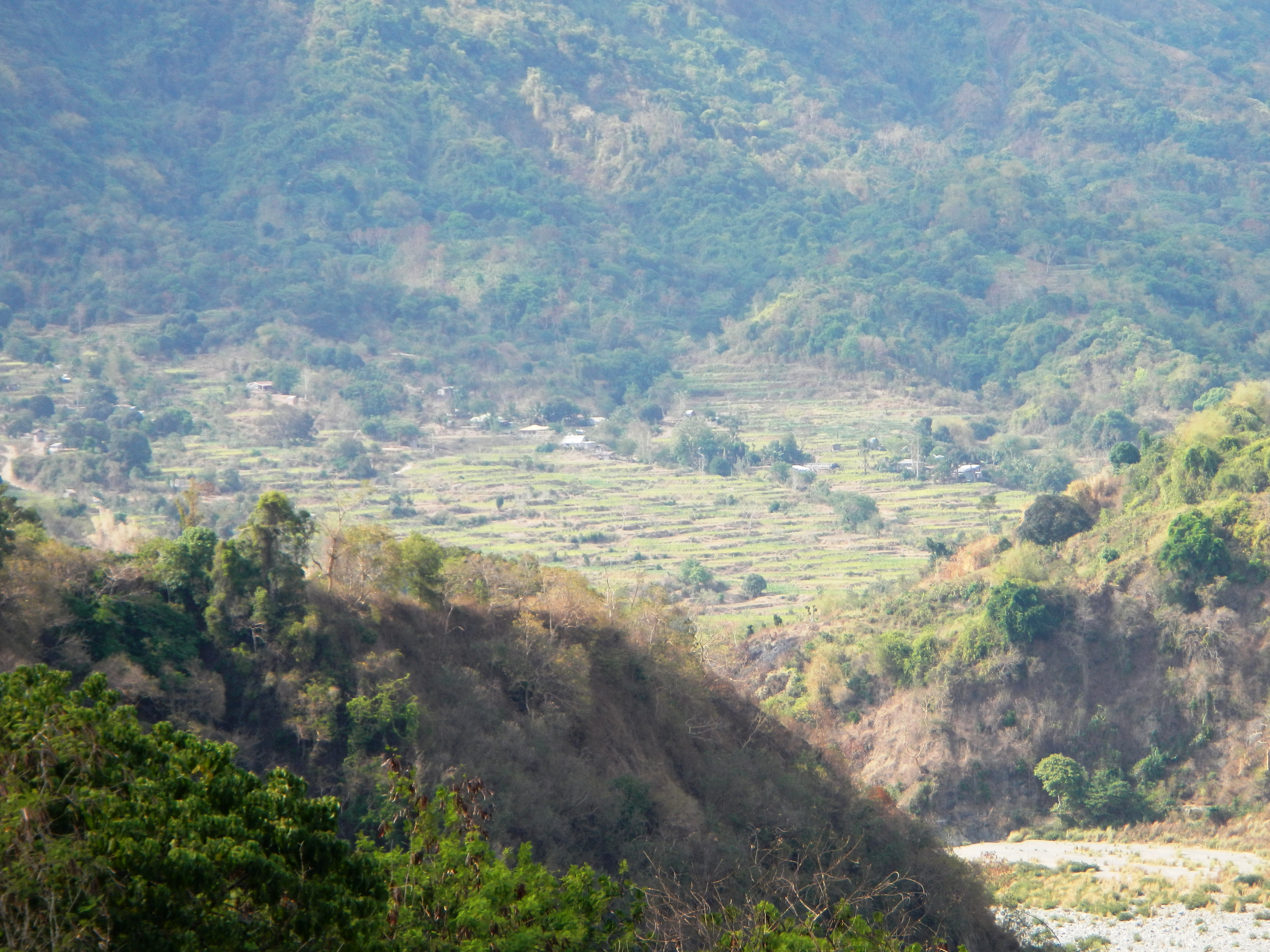
Rice Terraces in Bagulin

For corn, La Union produced 25,197.17 metric tons in the first quarter of 2024, with a yield of 5.86 metric tons per hectare across 4,299.63 hectares. However, corn production decreased by 1.46% in the second quarter of 2024, due to a reduction in harvested area and yield per hectare.

In 2021, sugarcane production reached 2,073.64 metric tons. In terms of fruit farming, banana and mango are the most prevalent, while grapes, guapple, and dragon fruit are also cultivated, mainly in Bauang and Caba. The province also produces highland vegetables, with the towns of San Gabriel, Santol, Bagulin, and Burgos being the main producers of crops like cabbage, wombok, carrots, and cucumber.

La Union is of the top tobacco producer in the Philippines, particularly known for Virginia and native tobacco. In 2021, the province produced 4,606.88 metric tons of tobacco. Balaoan is the leading tobacco-producing town in the province, contributing the highest excise tax shares from Virginia tobacco production. Other contributing towns include Agoo, Bacnotan, Burgos, Caba, Luna, San Gabriel, Santo Tomas, San Juan, Pugo, Naguilian, Bauang, Bangar, Bagulin, and Aringay.

Fisheries and Aquaculture

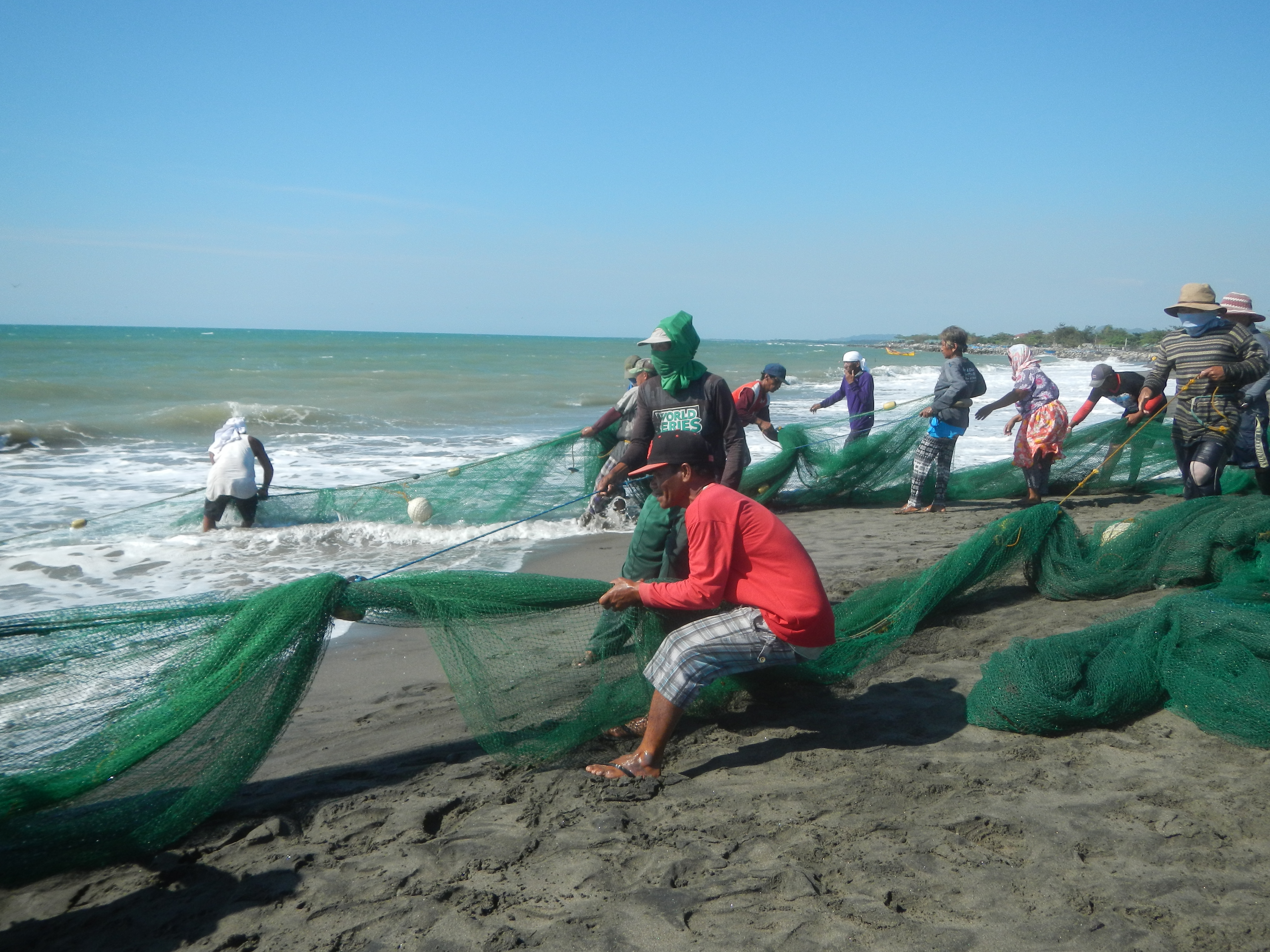
Fisherfolks in Agoo

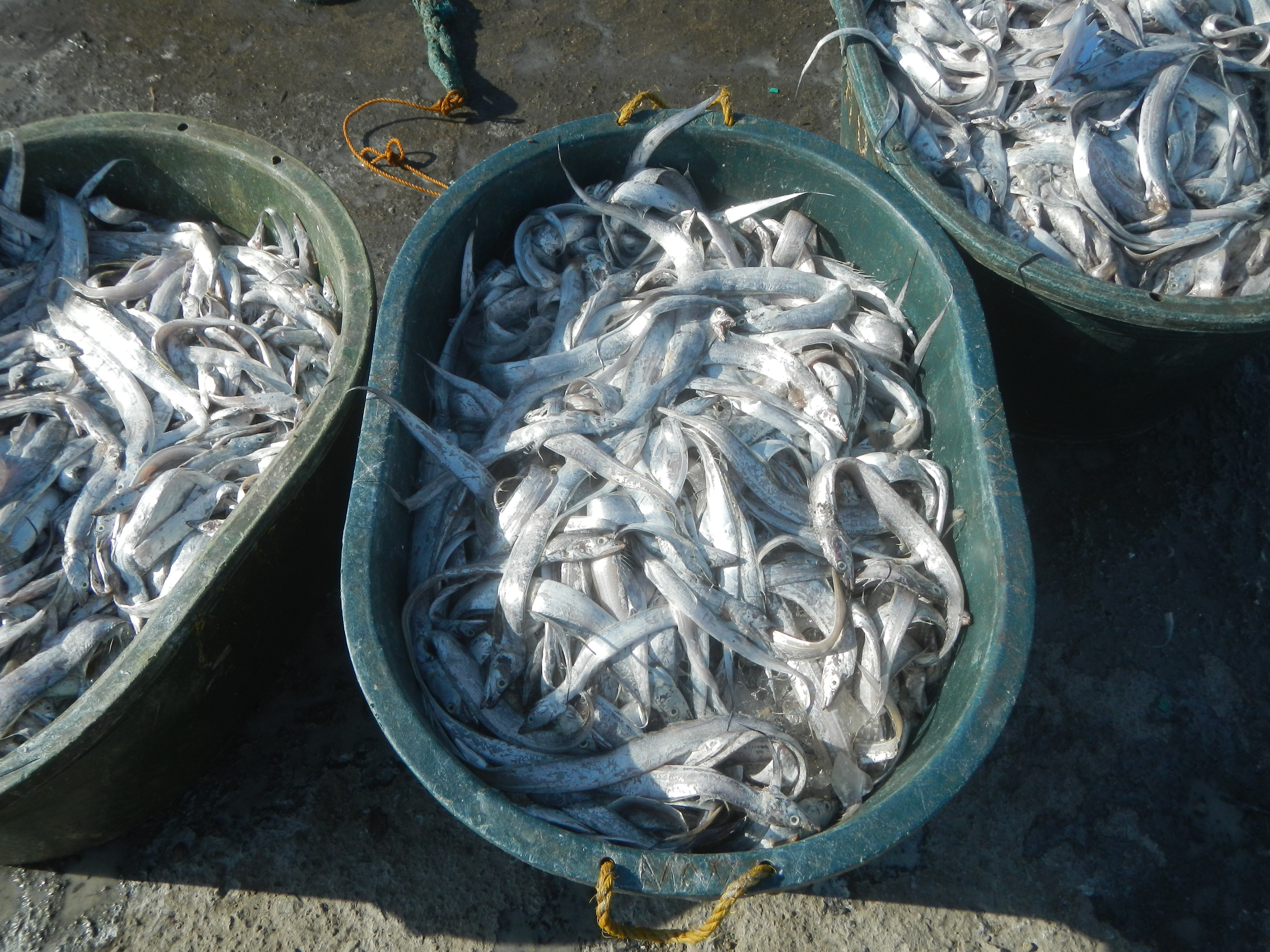
Bulong unas (beltfish) in Santo Tomas

The province's economy also heavily depends on its twelve coastal municipalities and fisheries. In the first quarter of 2024, municipal fisheries accounted for 75.27% of La Union's total fisheries production, with 1,932.23 metric tons produced. Marine fisheries made up the bulk of this, contributing 1,814.97 metric tons (93.93%), while inland fisheries contributed 117.26 metric tons (6.07%). Key species include threadfin bream (bisugo), skipjack tuna (gulyasan), cavalla (talakitok), and Spanish mackerel (tanigue).

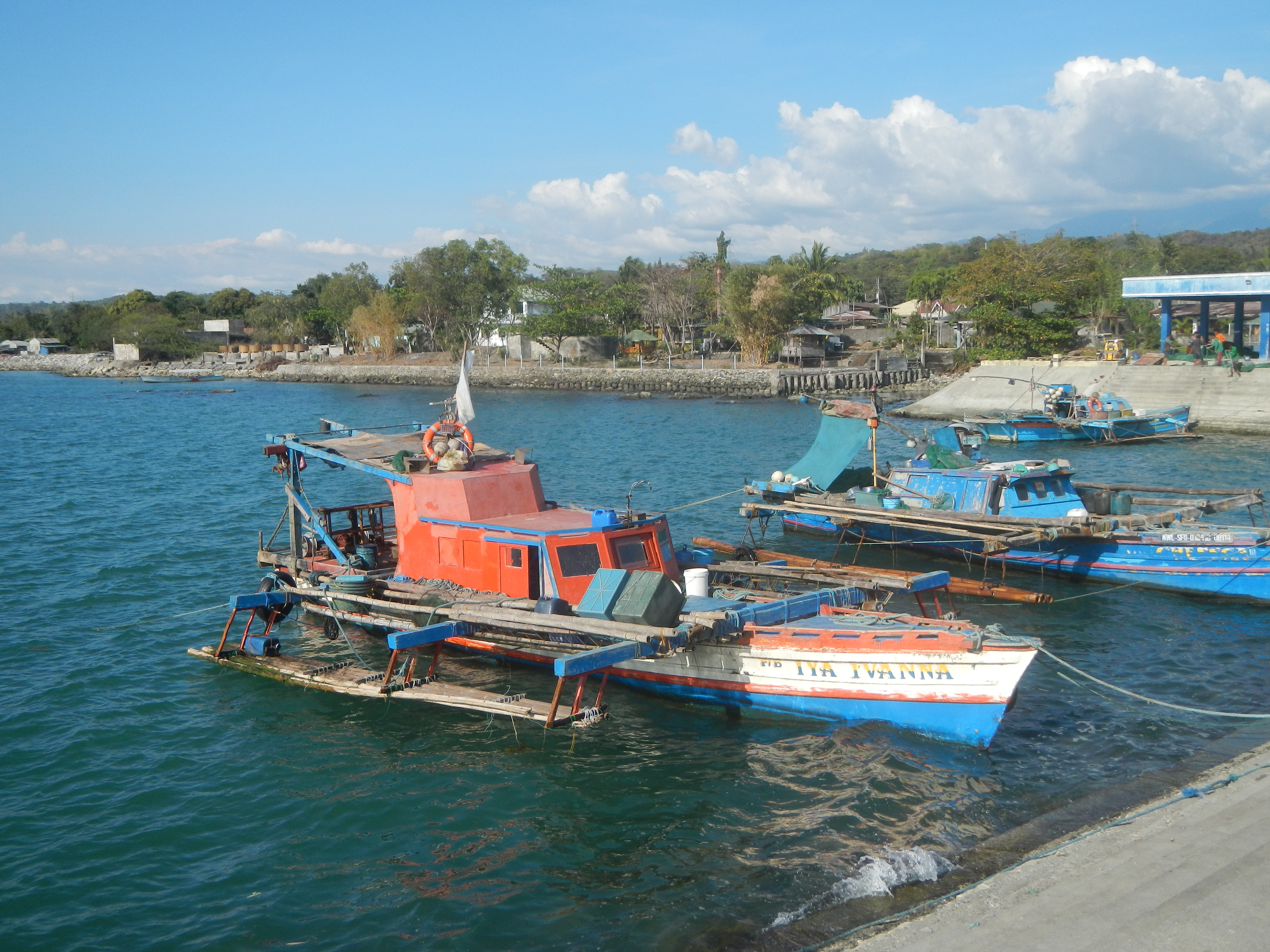
Fishing boats in Damortis

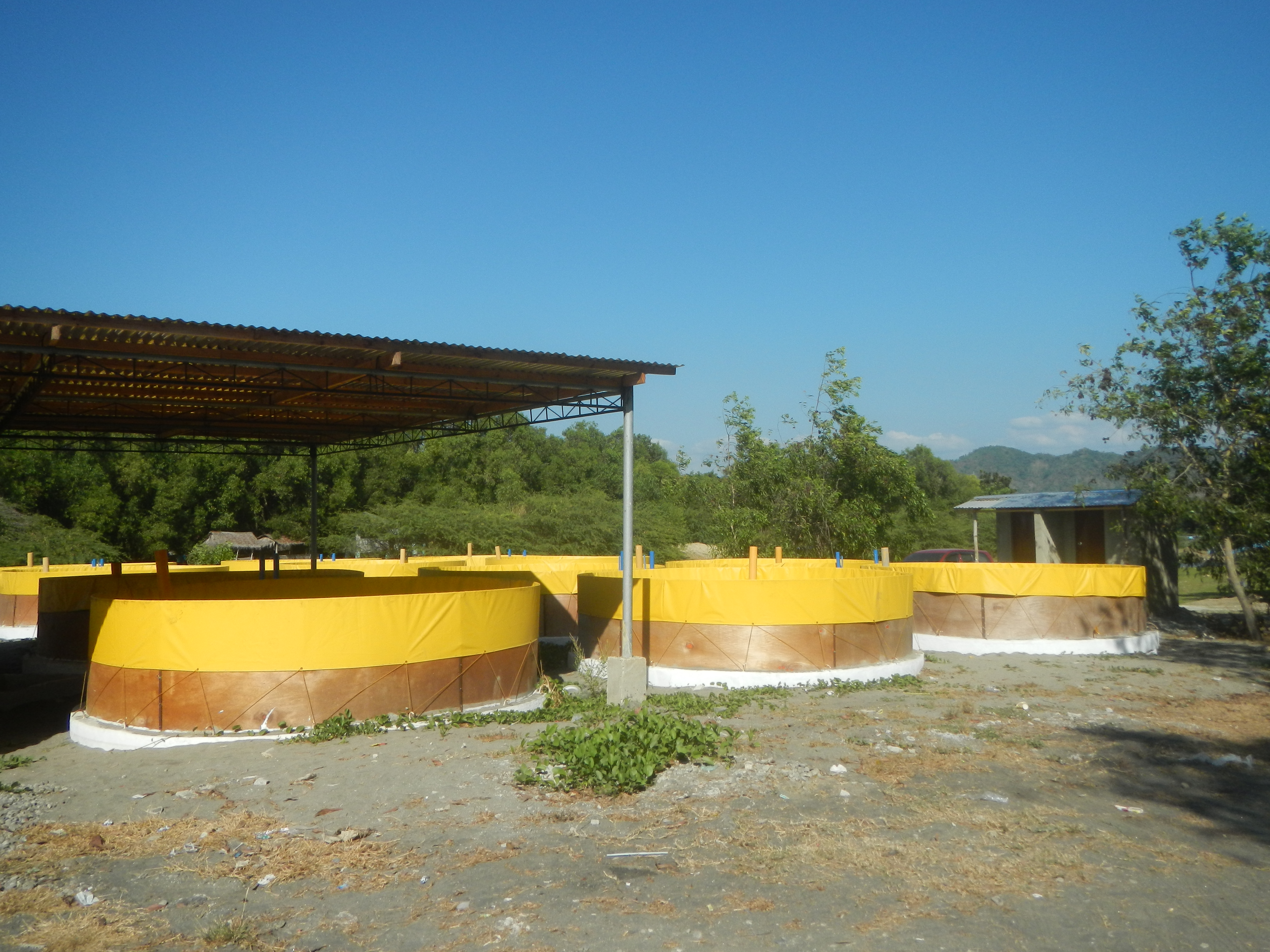
Fishponds in Aringay

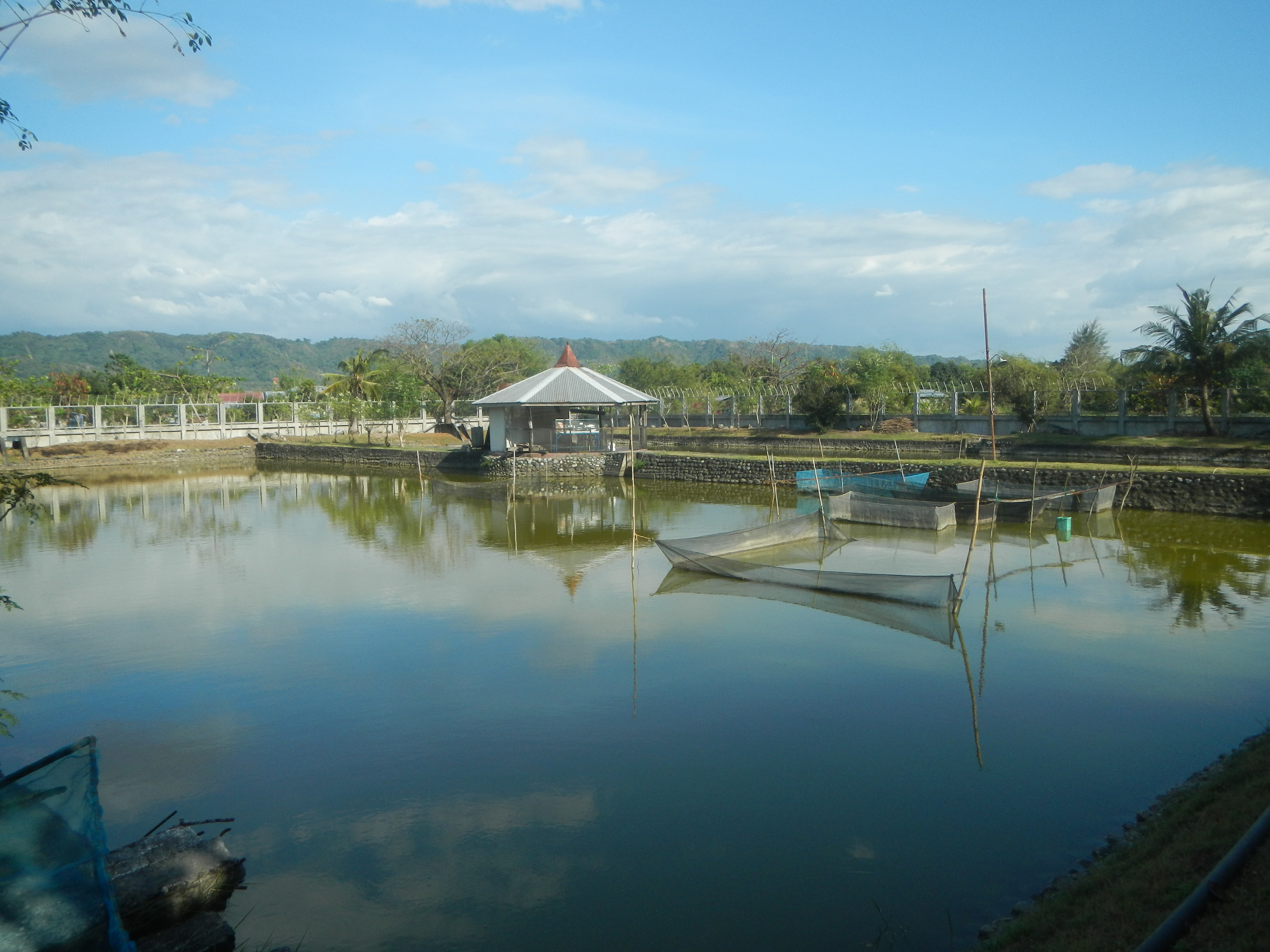
Fishpond in Agoo

Aquaculture contributed 22.01% of the total fisheries production, amounting to 564.89 metric tons in the first quarter of 2024. The majority of aquaculture production came from milkfish (bangus), which totaled 481.33 metric tons, followed by oysters (43.56 metric tons) and tiger prawn (13.21 metric tons).

In 2022, the top five species produced in La Union were milkfish, grouper, tilapia, tiger prawn, and threadfin bream. Aquaculture farming is concentrated in the towns of Santo Tomas, Aringay, Bacnotan, the City of San Fernando, Luna, and Bangar. Seaweed (ararosep or sea grapes) and sea urchin farming is also present in the province, mainly in Balaoan.

Commercial fisheries contributed 2.72% to total fisheries production, with 69.88 metric tons.

Animal Husbandry

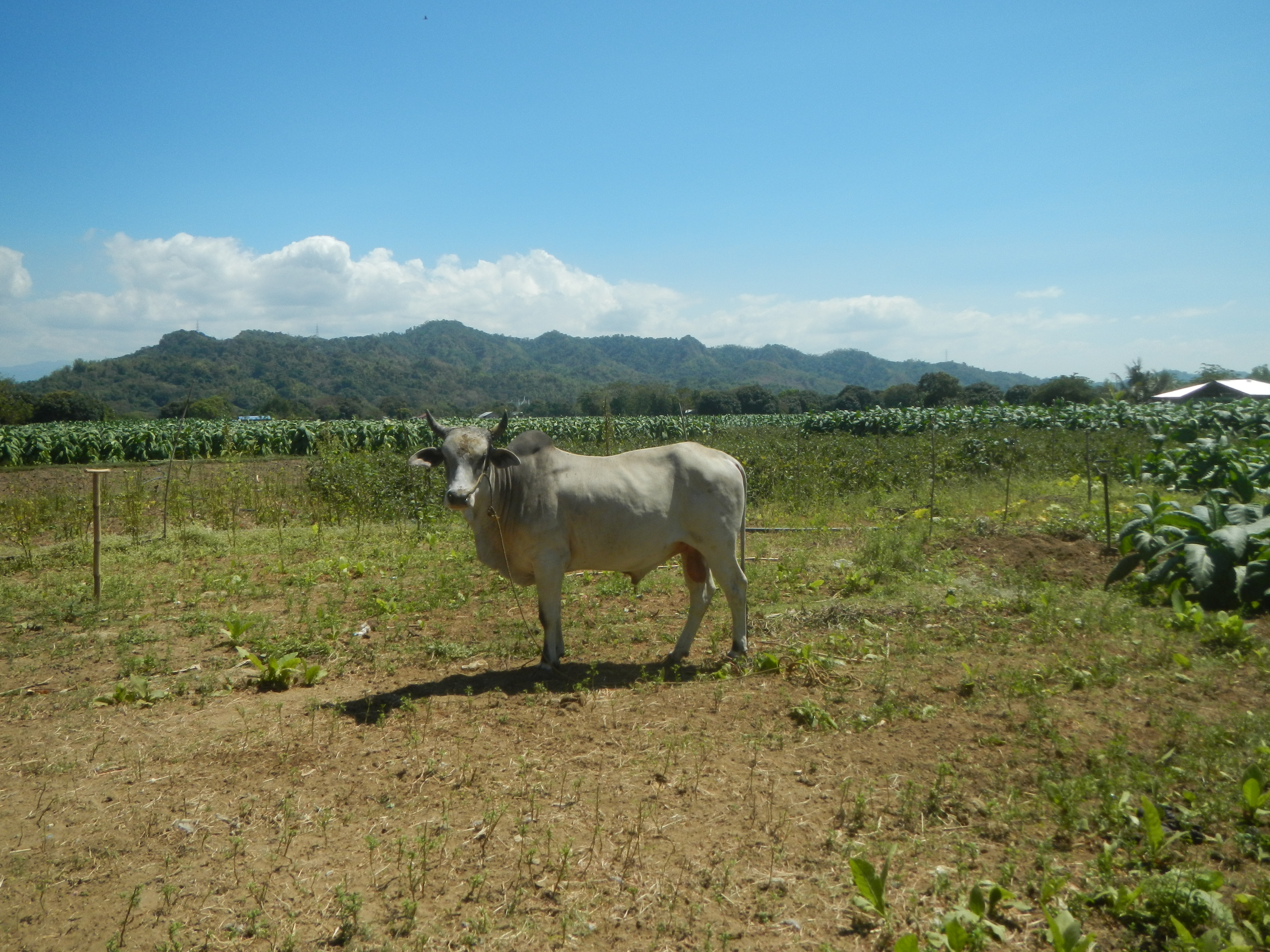
Livestock farm in Caba

In 2023, La Union's livestock production reached 13,556 metric tons liveweight. Hog production was the largest contributor, while carabao production accounted for 7.57%, and cattle production for 14.73%. Goat production increased by 3.82%, totaling 904 metric tons liveweight.

Poultry production in 2023 reached 24,579 metric tons liveweight. Chicken production was the largest, with 1.35 million heads. However, chicken egg production decreased by 15.81%, and duck egg output dropped by 39.29%. The province also had an inventory of 1.35 million chickens, with 15.72 million chickens dressed. Quail farming is prominent in Pugo, where eggs and meat are commercially raised.

=== Industry ===
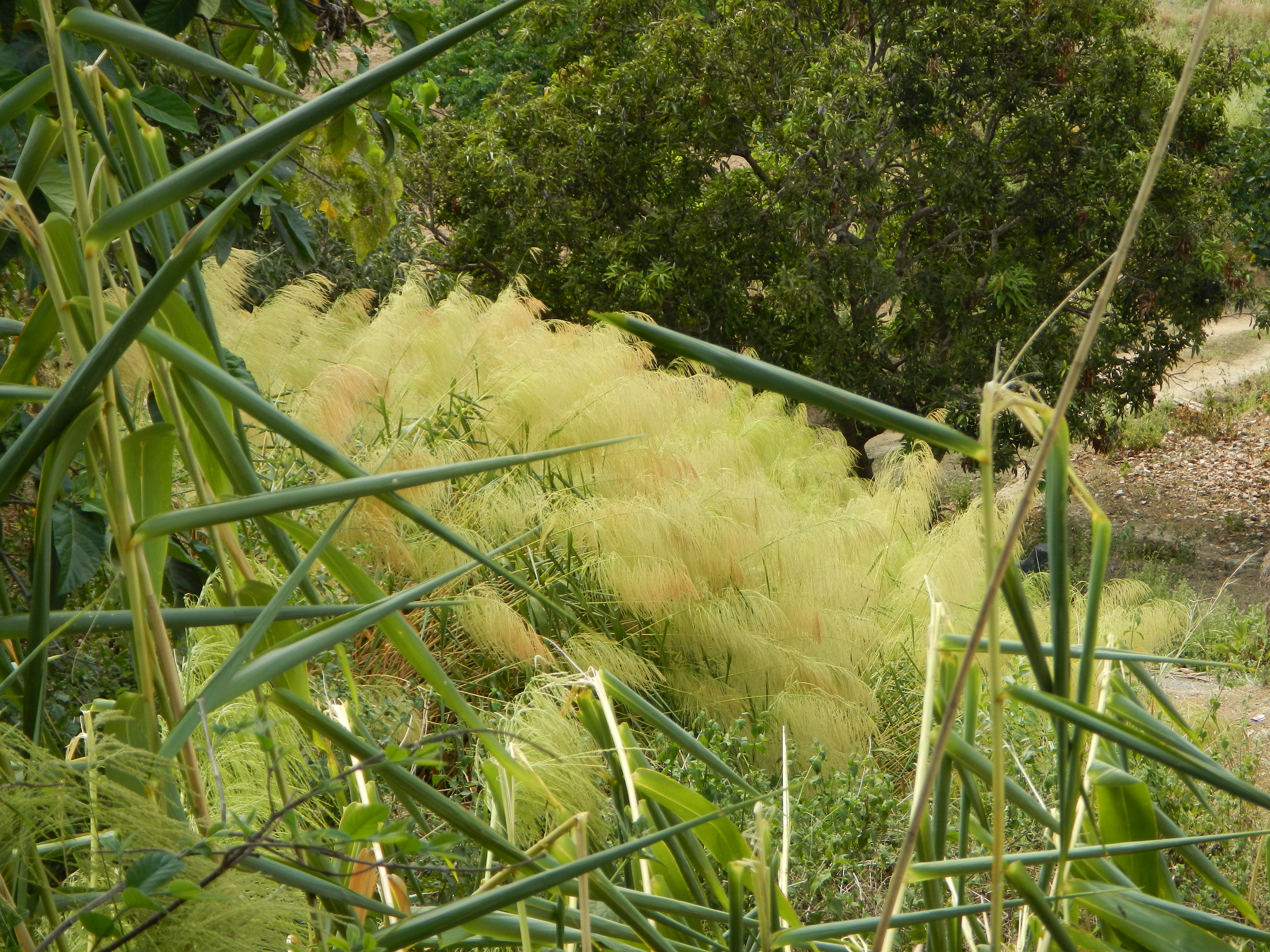
Tiger grass used in making soft brooms, Bagulin

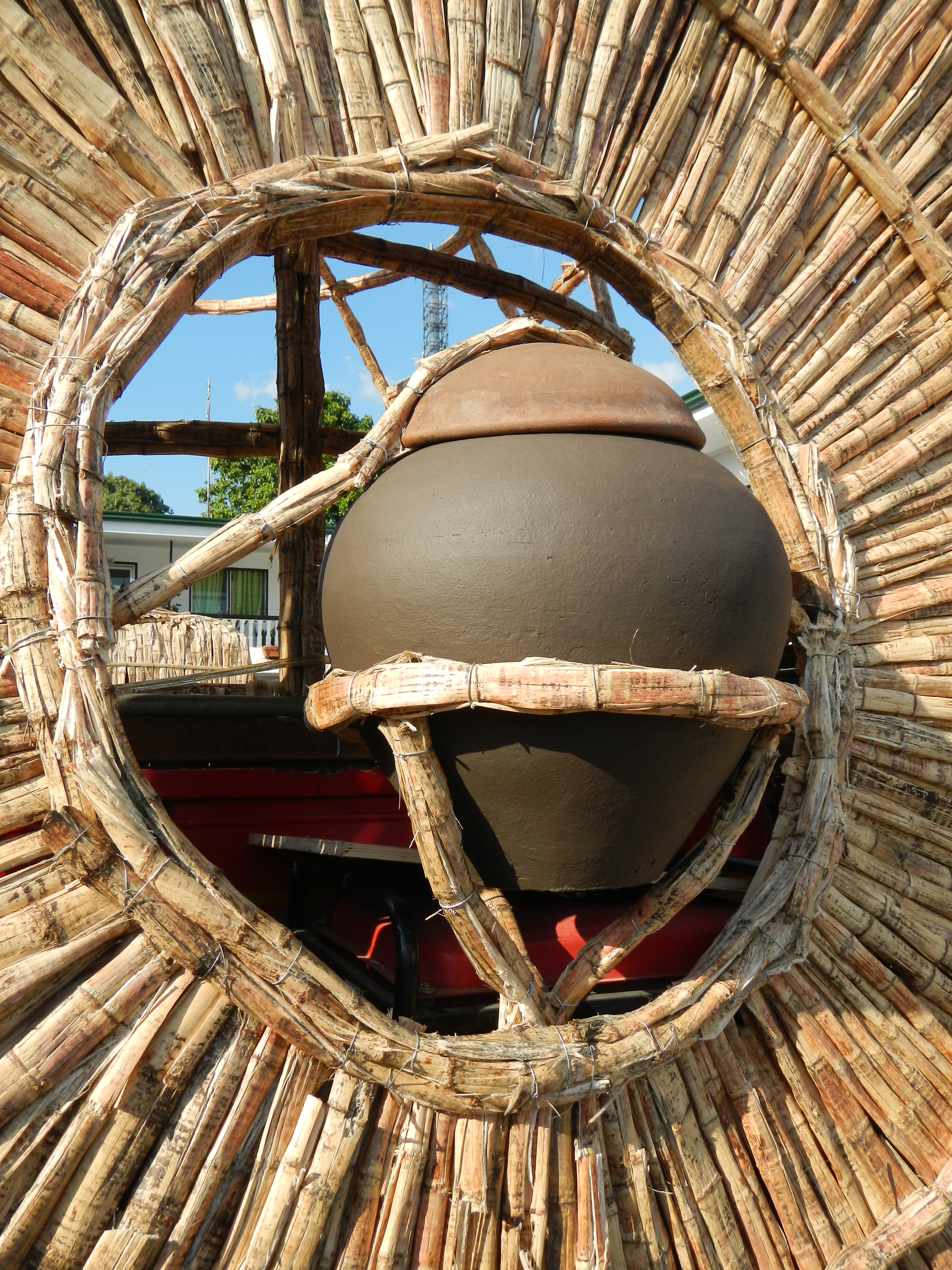
Sugarcane wine (basi) in Naguilian

La Union’s economy is driven by agro-industries, cottage industries, and manufacturing sectors, which support the growth of micro, small, and medium enterprises (MSMEs), serving as key drivers of economic growth in the province.

The province participates in the One Town, One Product (OTOP) initiative, promoting local products such as weaving (inabel) and blacksmithing (panday) in Bangar, sugarcane wine (basi) and vinegar (sukang Iloko) in Naguilian, rice wine (tapuy), and soft broom (buyboy) production using tiger grass in Bagulin and Burgos, honey (diro) production or apiculture in Bacnotan, fish paste (bugguong) and dried fish (daing) in Santo Tomas, salt farming in Balaoan, chichacorn (cornick) production in Tubao, and mushroom farming or fungiculture in Agoo.

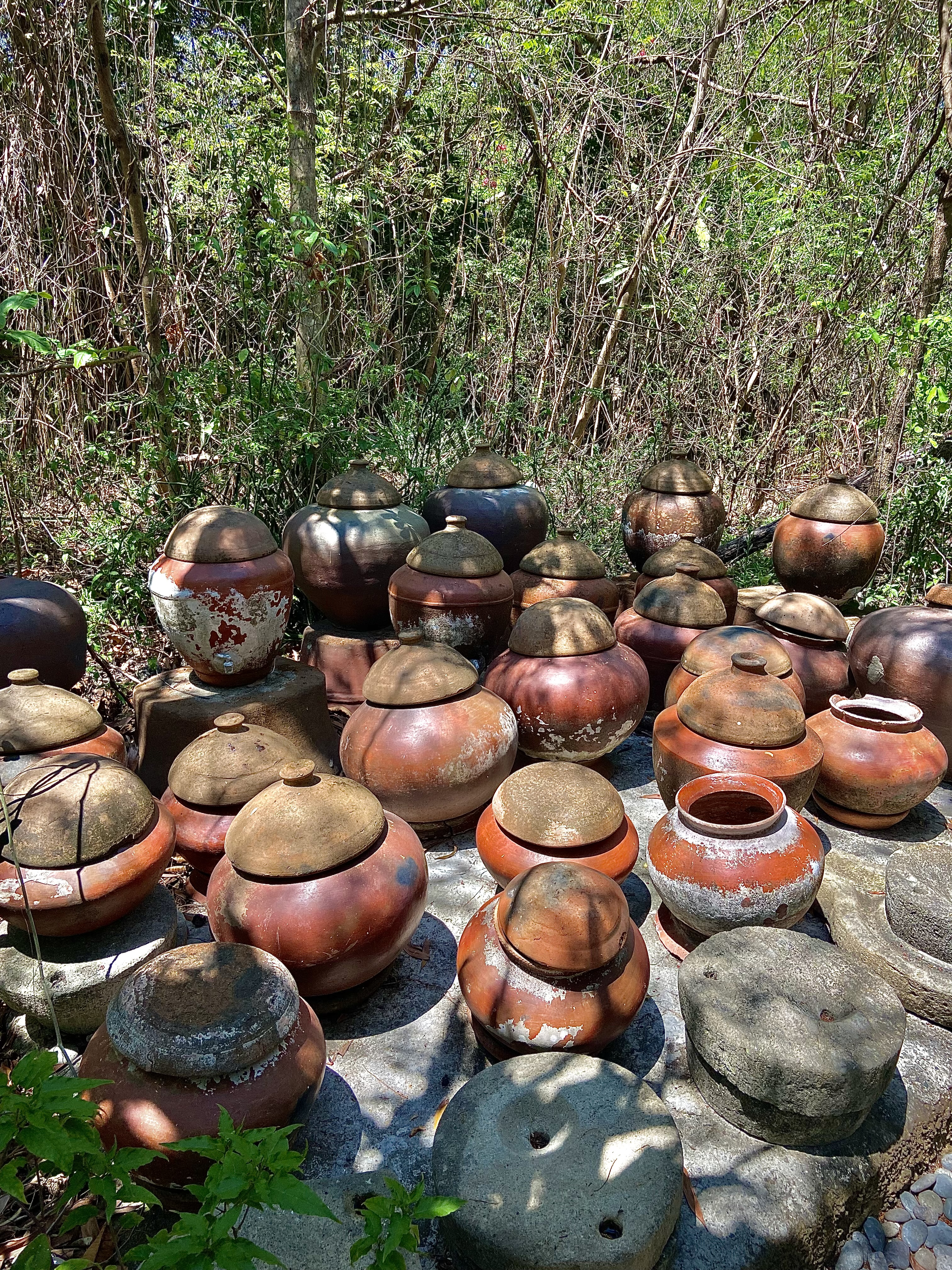
Pottery (damili) in Luna

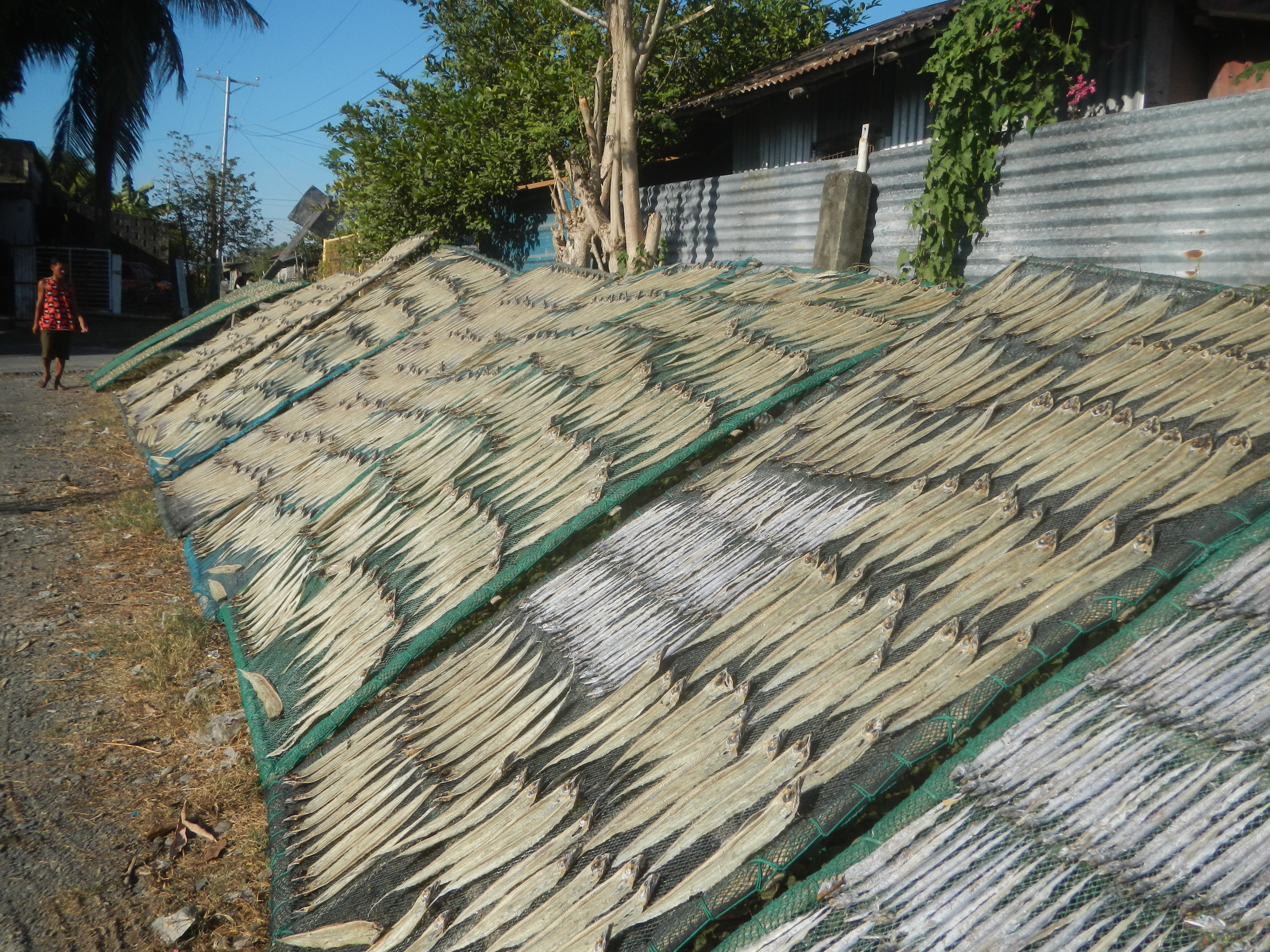
Dried fish production in Damortis

Handicrafts also contribute to the local economy, with red clay pottery (damili) in San Juan, woodcarving and furnishing products in Pugo and Rosario, and rattan and bamboo basketry (laga) in Santol and Sudipen.

Manufacturing industries include Universal Leaf Corporation in Agoo, Holcim Cement, Inc. in Bacnotan, Pepsi Cola Plant in Rosario, Coca-Cola Plant in San Fernando City, B-Meg Satellite Plant in San Juan and Bacnotan, Amanianan Motors in Rosario, and Fortune Tobacco Corporation in Rosario. These industries provide significant employment opportunities and contribute to the economic stability of La Union by leveraging its local resources and products.

=== Service ===
The service sector is a vital driver of La Union’s economy, significantly contributing to the province’s development through trade, healthcare, education, commerce, transportation, and hospitality.

Transportation and Infrastructure

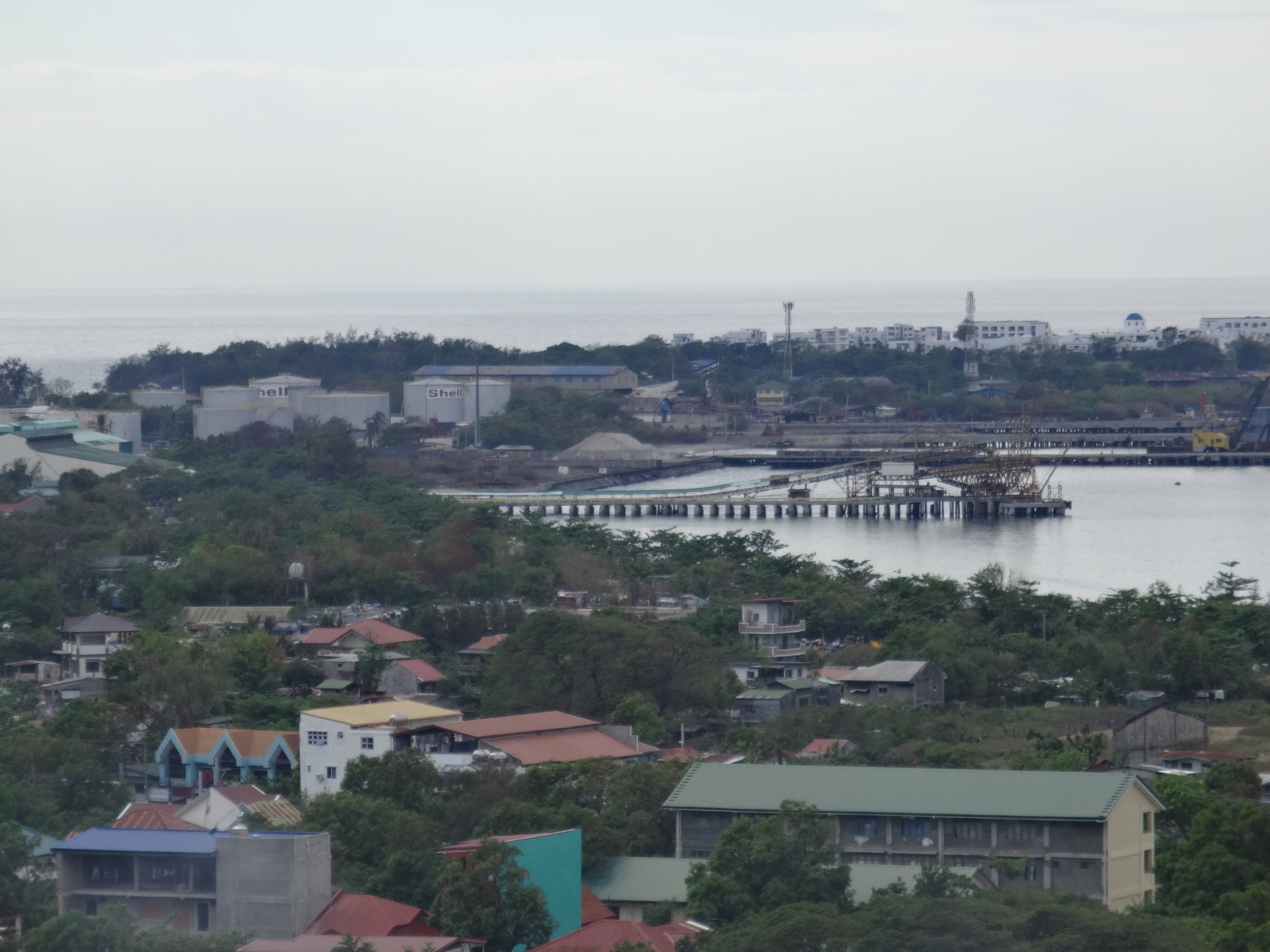
Poro Point Freeport Zone in City of San Fernando,

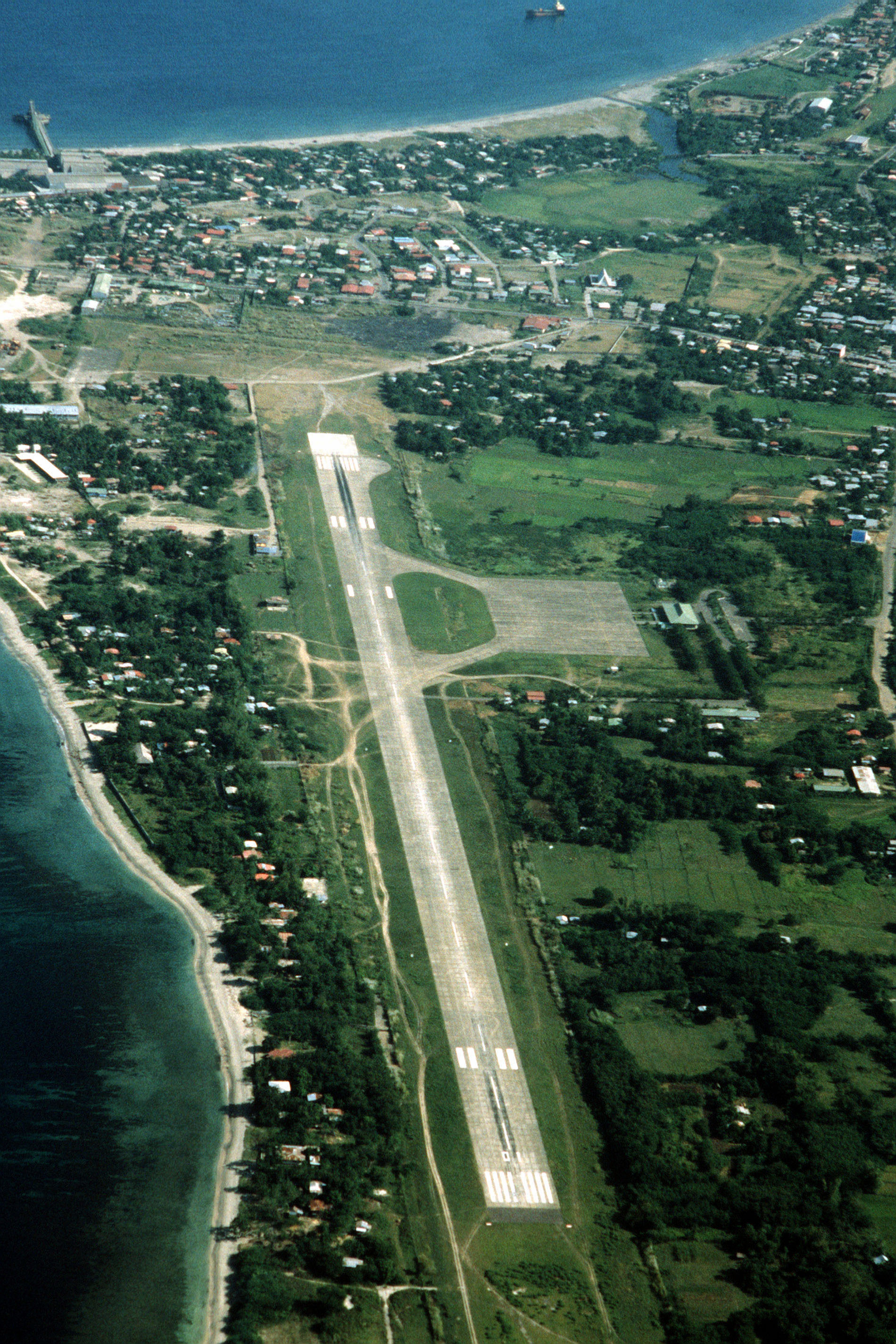
San Fernando Domestic Airport

Transportation infrastructure, including the San Fernando International Seaport and San Fernando (Poro Point) Domestic Airport, plays a crucial role in facilitating economic activity. The seaport, with its 30-hectare facility and multiple piers, supports trade by accommodating various vessels, while the Soiltech Pier enhances cargo-handling capacity. The airport, covering 40.5 hectares, provides critical access to regional destinations, boosting tourism and trade, which contribute to local revenue and job creation.

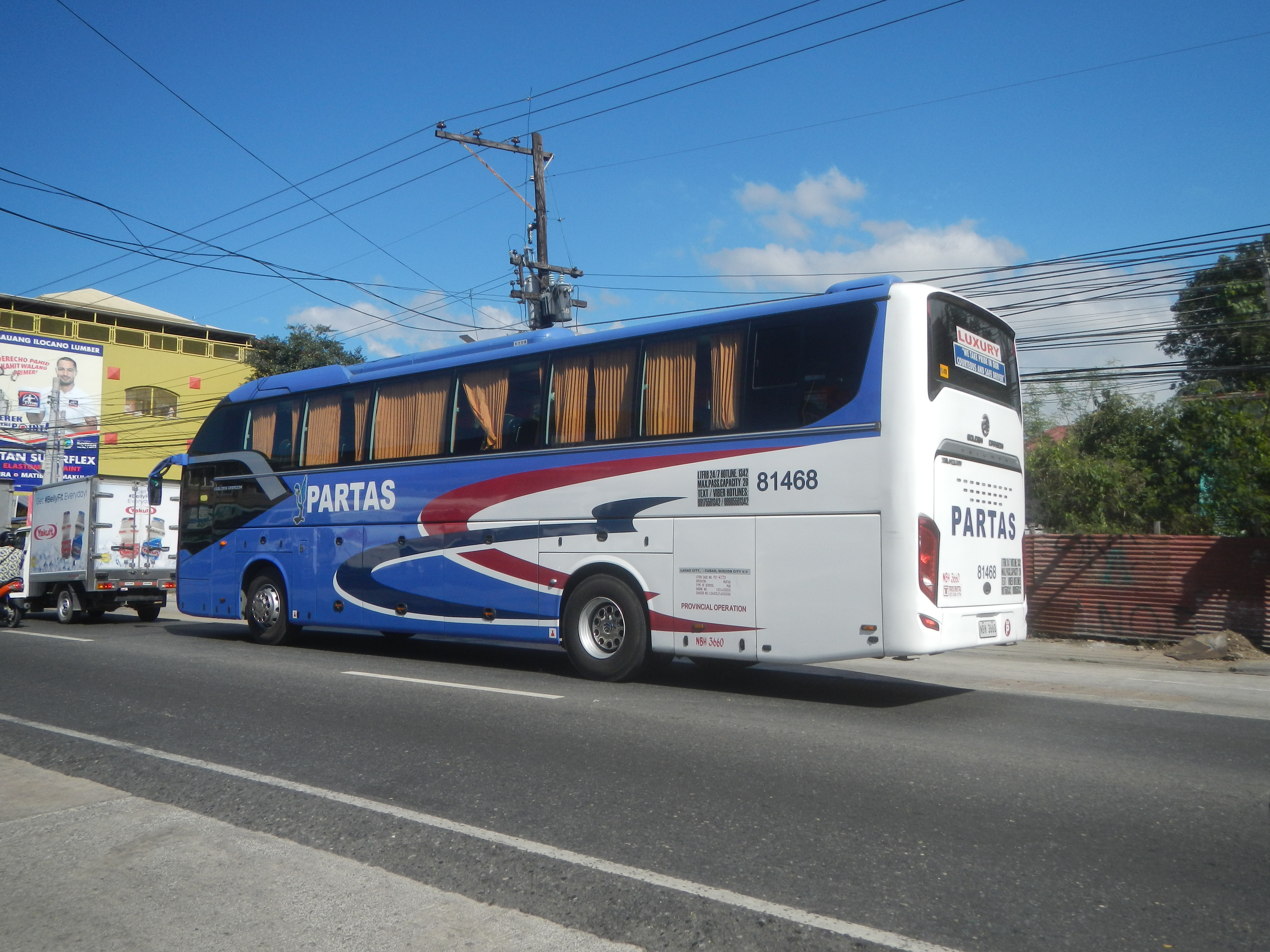
Partas bus in Bauang

Public transportation, operated by providers such as La Union Transport Multi-Purpose Cooperative (LUTRAMPCO), Central Ilocos Transport Service Cooperative (CITRANSCO) Partas Transportation, Viron Transit, and La Union Pangasinan Transit, ensures mobility such as e-jeepney and taxis across the province, supporting commerce and the daily needs of residents and businesses.

The province is served by the Tarlac–Pangasinan–La Union Expressway (TPLEX), which links directly from Manila via the North Luzon Expressway (NLEX) and the Subic–Clark–Tarlac Expressway (SCTEX). Rosario is the only exit and the northern terminus of the expressway. A 59-4 kilometer extension of the expressway will lead all the way to San Juan, and the cost is ₱23.36 billion. As of 2026, the project remains in the pre-construction stage.

Business Process Outsourcing (BPO)

The emerging BPO sector drives economic growth by generating employment and supporting businesses with customer service, technical assistance, and administrative functions. Companies like TaskUs Lighthouse and VIRTUS BPO Corp. contribute to the local economy by attracting investments and providing jobs to residents.

Education

La Union has 413 educational institutions, including a state university with four campuses, supports workforce development, equipping residents with skills and knowledge that contribute to the province's economic productivity.

Healthcare

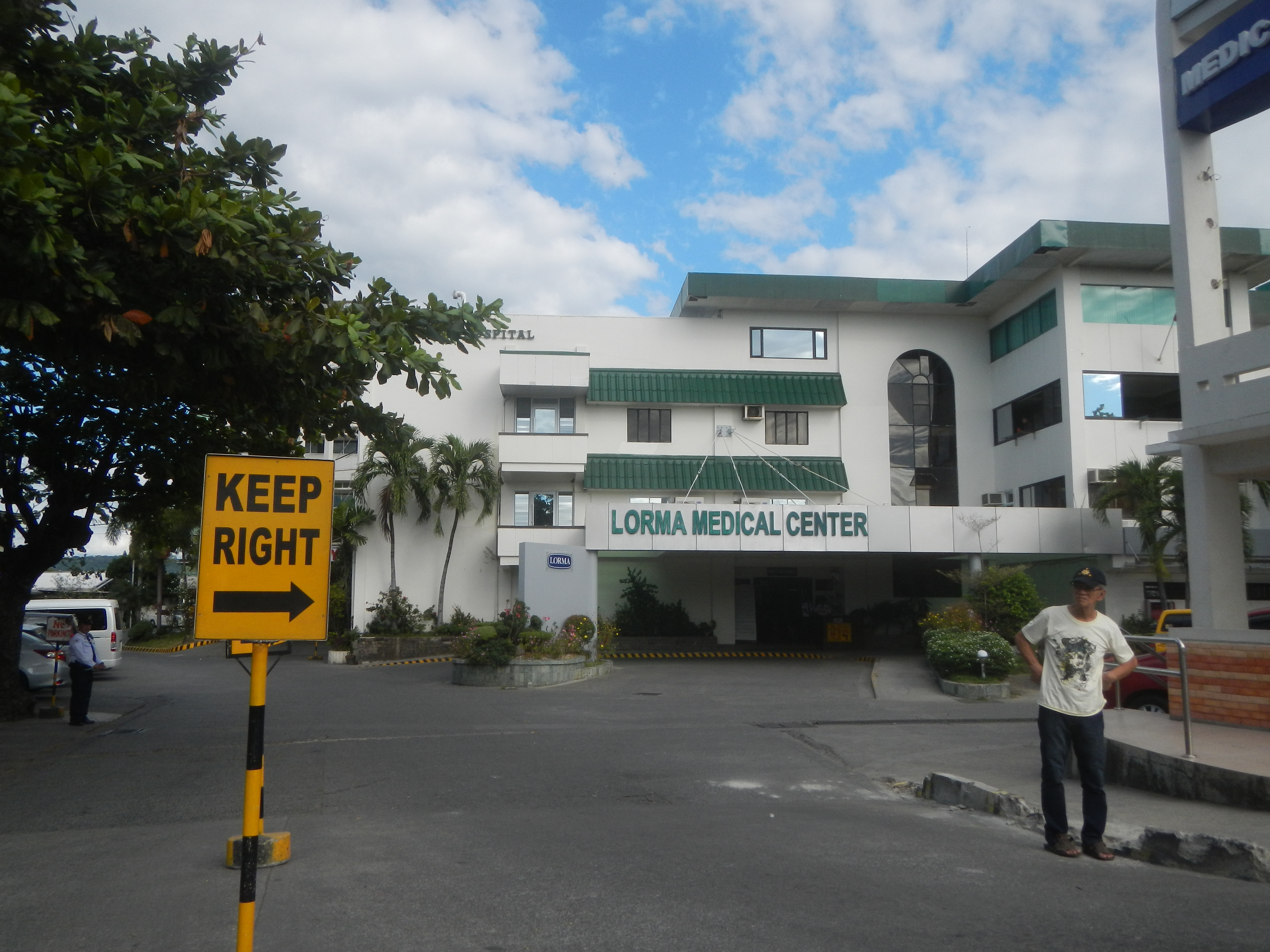
Lorma Medical Center in City of San Fernando

The healthcare sector, anchored by 16 private hospitals and 7 public hospitals, including the Ilocos Training and Regional Medical Center (ITRMC), which is recognized as the core of public health and medical care in the Ilocos Region, strengthens the economy by offering essential services and creating employment in medical and allied fields. These institutions attract patients from neighboring regions, boosting local spending.

Hospitality

The hospitality industry is a major economic pillar in the province including in food and beverage services, also known as the Surfing Capital of the North, with hotels, resorts, and restaurants generating significant revenue. Establishments such as Thunderbird Resort and Casinos, Aureo La Union, and Sunset Bay Beach Resort attract domestic and international tourists, boosting local businesses and creating jobs in travel, entertainment, and culinary services. Tourism spending contributes directly to the province’s economy, reinforcing

=== Tourism ===
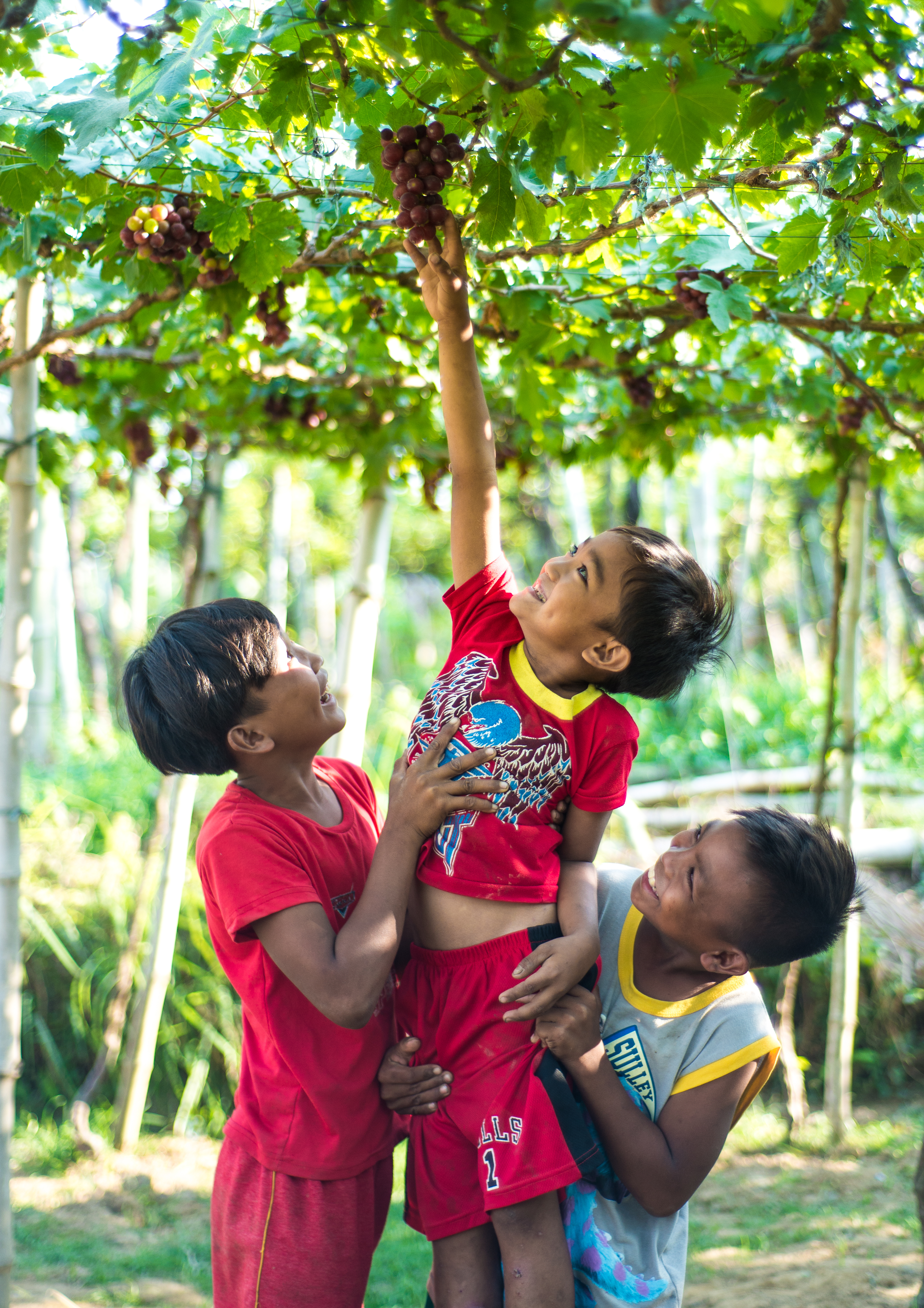
Grape Farm in Bauang

La Union is positioning itself as the Heart of Agri-Tourism in Northern Luzon by 2025. The expansion of innovative agricultural practices has boosted the province’s tourism sector, with many farms transforming their sites into destinations that offer various activities for visitors.

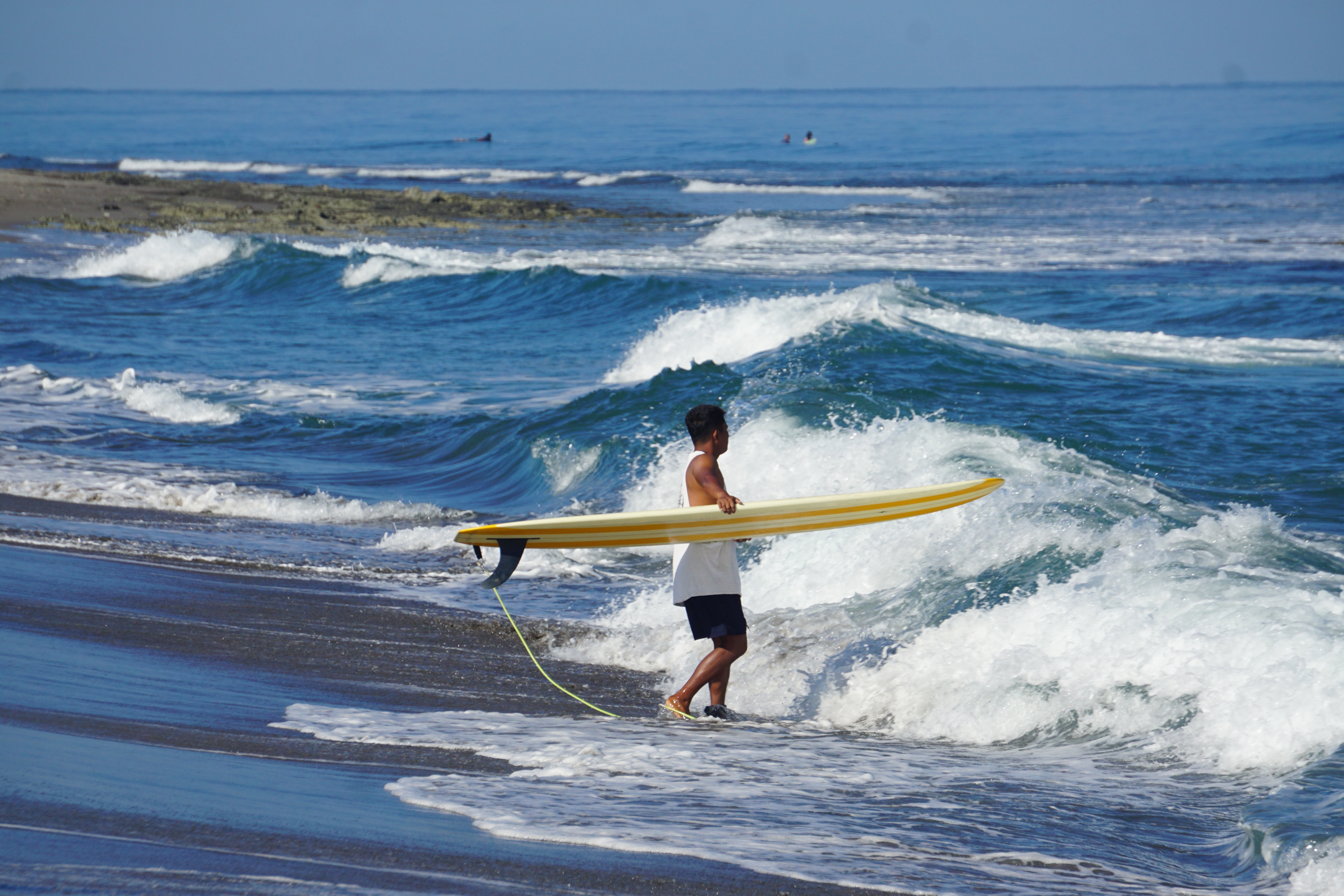
Surftown, San Juan

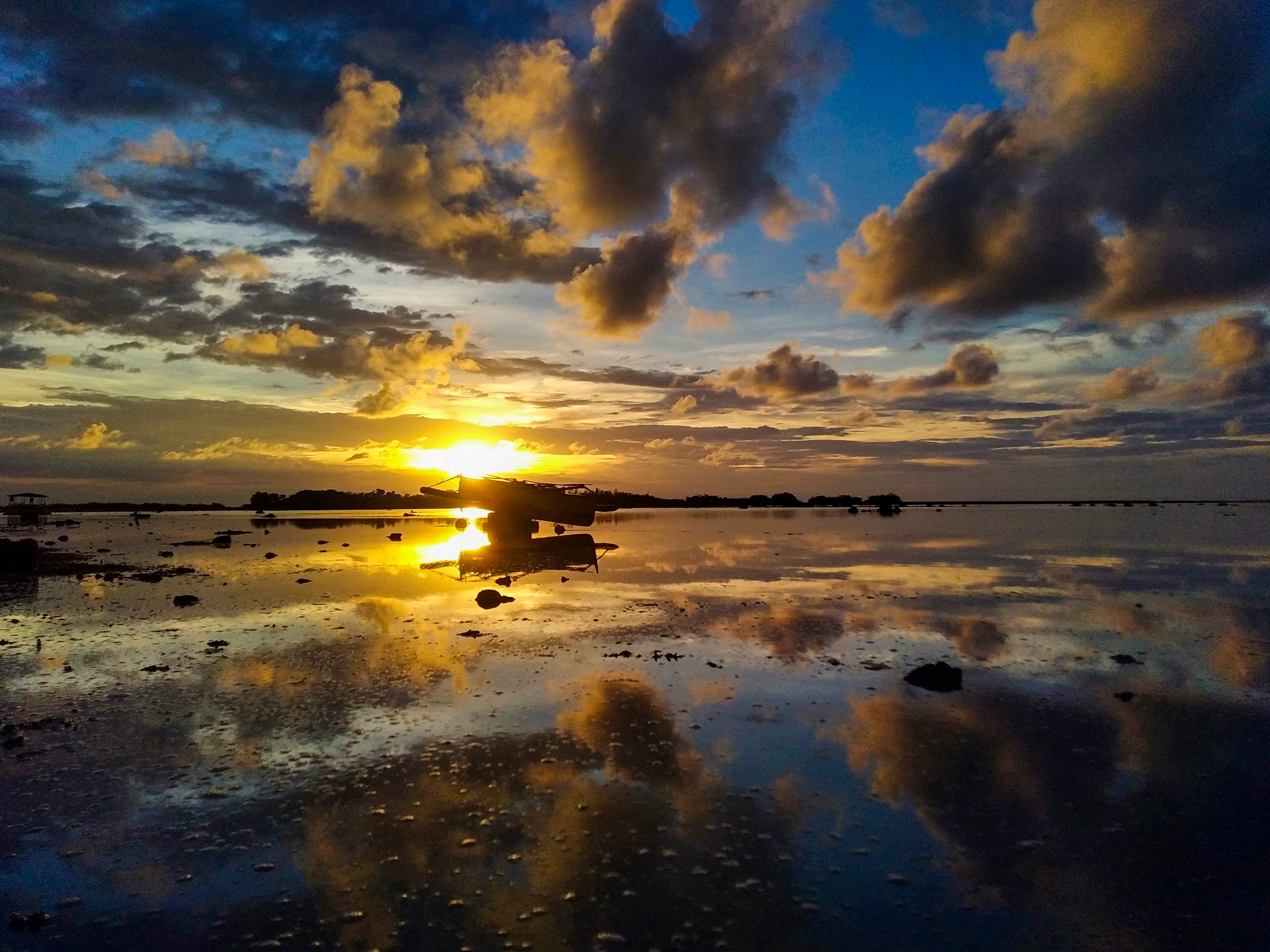
Immuki Island, Balaoan

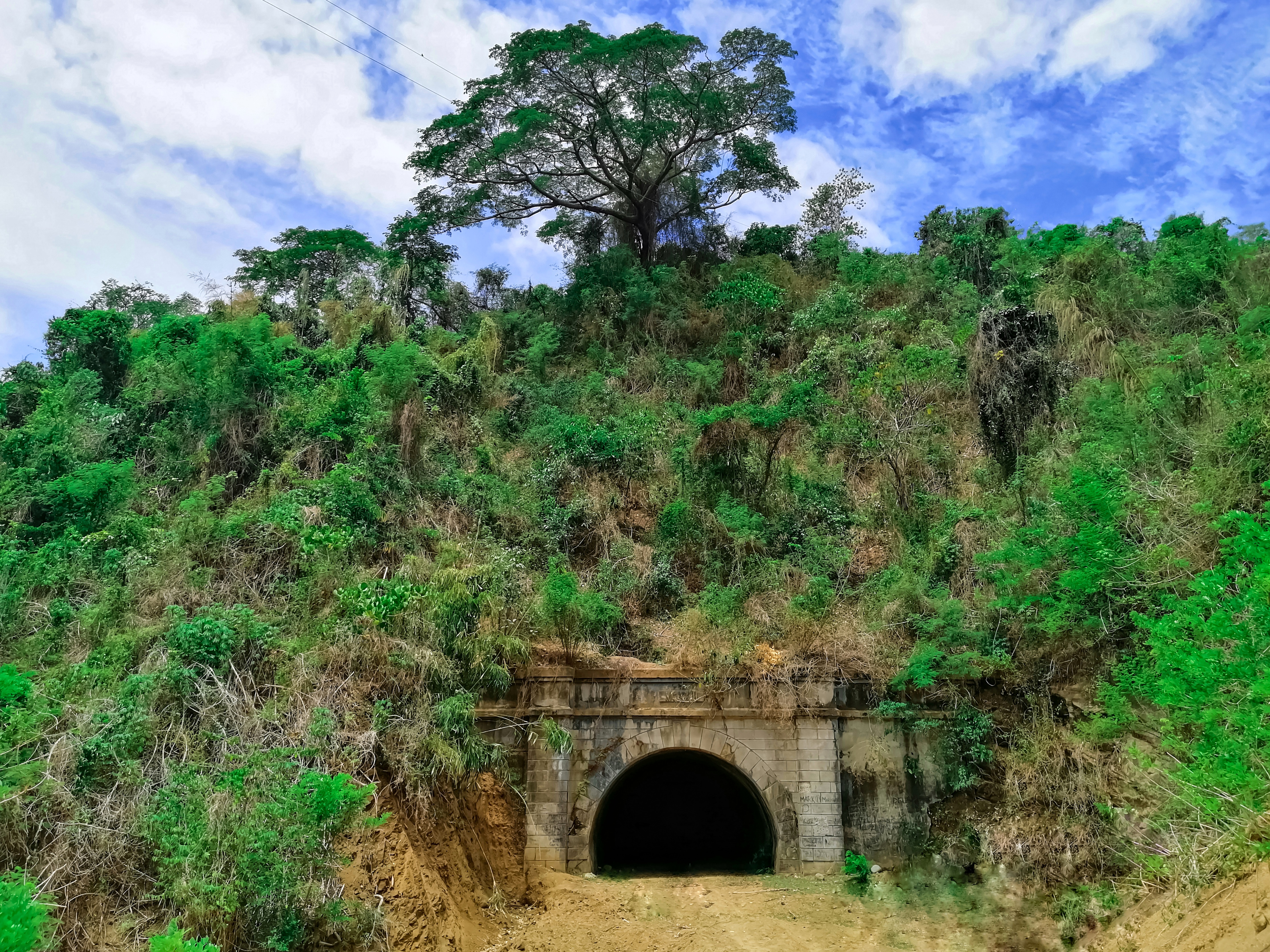
Centennial Tunnel, Aringay

In 2022, the province welcomed 494,387 tourists, a figure that increased to 550,359 in 2023, generating over ₱1 billion in tourism receipts. During the first half of 2024, La Union attracted 237,868 overnight visitors, with an average length of stay of 1.37 days, bringing in an estimated ₱462,210,706.59 in tourism revenue. These numbers underline the significance of tourism to La Union's economy, with strong visitor arrivals and considerable financial contributions.

The top three tourist destinations in 2023 were San Juan, which attracted 215,645 visitors, Bauang with 100,762 visitors, and San Fernando City, with 97,726 visitors. These destinations highlight the province’s appeal as a tourism hub, contributing both to the local economy and to La Union’s growing reputation as a premier destination in Northern Luzon.

== Culture ==
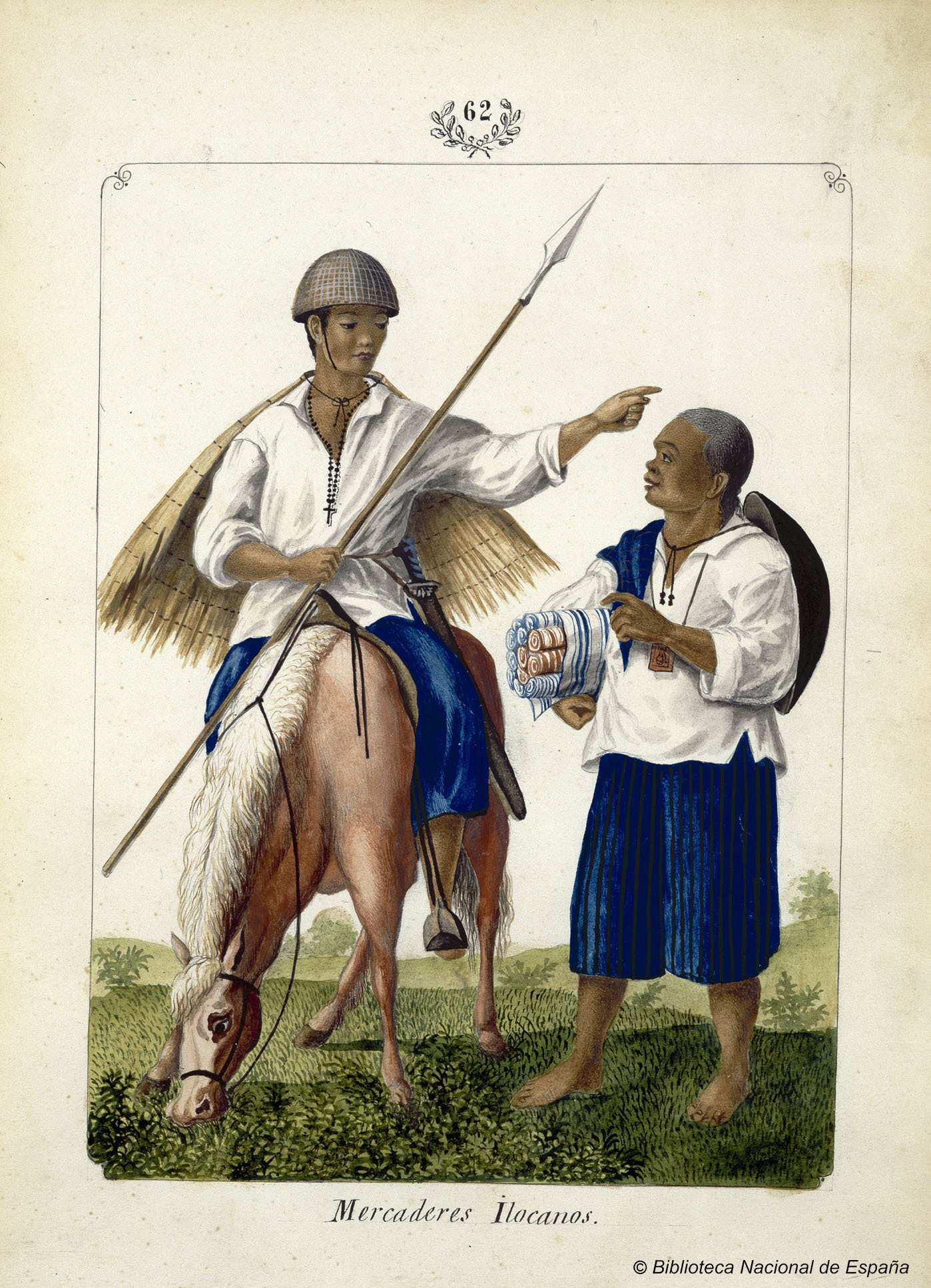
Ilocano merchants in the mid-19th century

La Union’s culture is an union of Ilocano, Pangasinan, and Cordilleran traditions, shaped over centuries by the province’s history, geography, and social dynamics. This cultural heritage has been influenced by indigenous practices as well as colonial and foreign interactions, making it particularly diverse.

Anchored in Ilocano heritage, with approximately 82% of the population identifying as Ilocano and the majority being Roman Catholic, Elyucanos, are recognized for their hardworking, thrifty, and resilient nature. They are often celebrated for their ability to endure adversity, with gasat (fate) determining their life on earth, reflecting a deep connection to their Ilocano roots.

The province is well-known for its traditional industries, which include abel (weaving), damili (pottery), and wine-making. These crafts are integral to the province's identity, showcasing the skill and artistry of the local population. La Union’s fiestas are central to the province’s cultural and religious expression, embodying the spirit of community and celebration.

The province's contributions to Philippine arts and culture are significant, as it is the birthplace of prominent national figures such as writer and World War II hero Manuel Arguilla, and National Artist for Music, Lucrecia Roces Kasilag. Their legacies further highlight the cultural richness and artistic heritage of the province.

Weaving

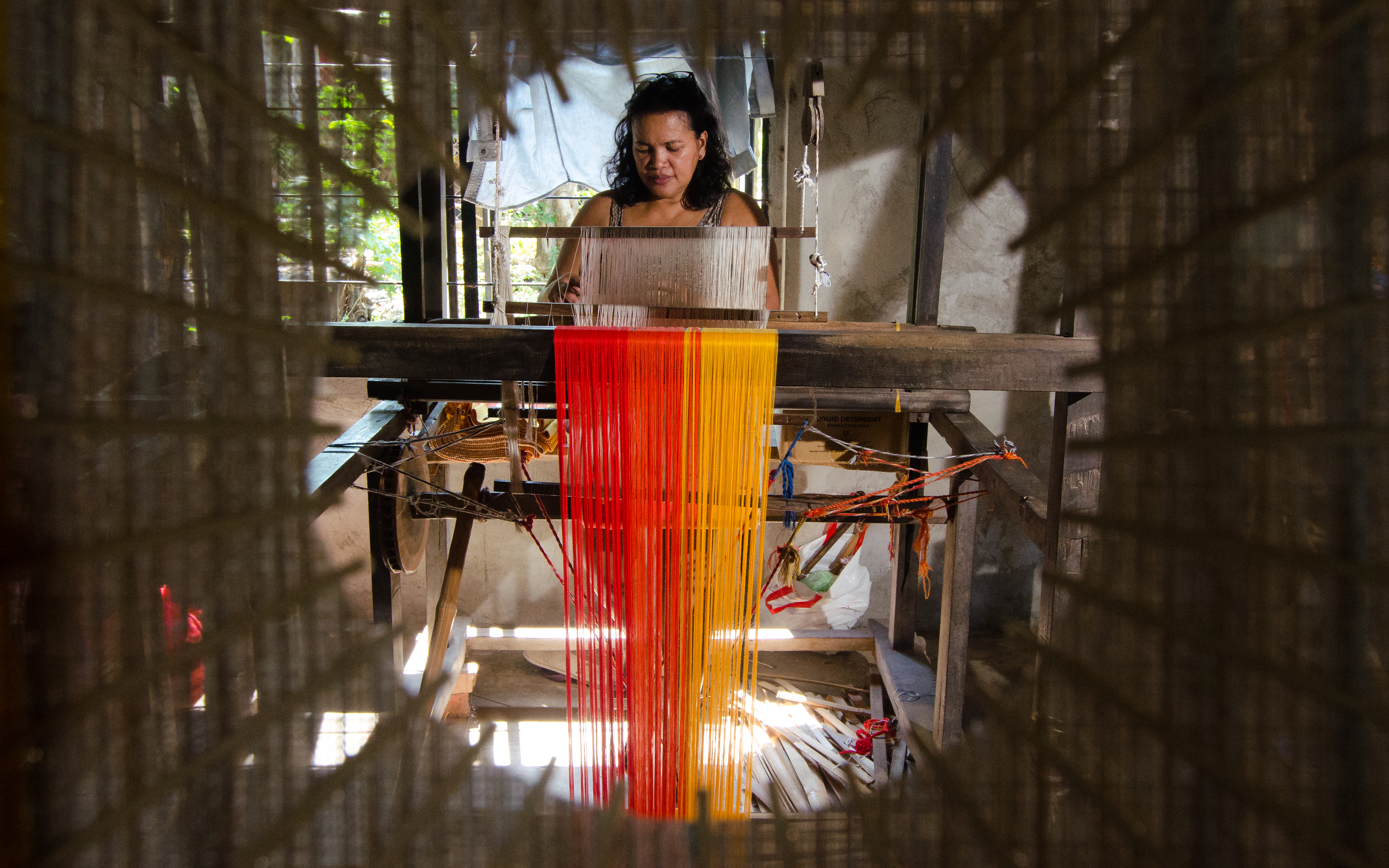
Abel Weaver

The municipality of Bangar is renowned for its loom-weaving industry, producing inabel, a traditional Ilocano fabric. Abel means to weave in Ilocano, and inabel refers specifically to textiles that are distinctly Ilocano in origin. The town has been known for centuries for its expertise in producing these fabrics, a key element of the local heritage.

Pottery

Pottery, or damili in Ilocano, is one of the oldest and most cherished art forms in La Union. In the town of San Juan, particularly along Barangay Taboc, the craft of pottery making thrives. Local artisans produce traditional items such as dalikán (firewood-fed stoves), burnay (earthen jars), banga (cooking pots), and dongdóng (larger cooking pots), among other items like plant pots, decorative pottery, and roof tiles.

Winery

The tradition of wine-making in La Union is particularly preserved in Naguilian, where basi, a fermented alcoholic beverage made from sugarcane, has been produced for centuries. The method of making basi in Naguilian is distinct, involving a preparation of bubod (starter), boiled sugarcane juice, and unique additives like lomboy bark, tangal bark, and green guava leaves. Historically, basi was integral to Ilocano rituals, marking significant life events such as marriages, births, and funerals.

Traditional rice wine, known as tapuy, is also widely enjoyed by the Cordilleran (Igorot) communities in the province, further enriching the local cultural heritage.

=== Festivals (Fiestas) ===
Festivals in La Union center on the province's agricultural heritage and local traditions. Each municipality hosts an annual town fiesta celebrating local culture and agriculture. In addition to municipal fiestas, the province observes several major festivals that highlight its history and cultural diversity.

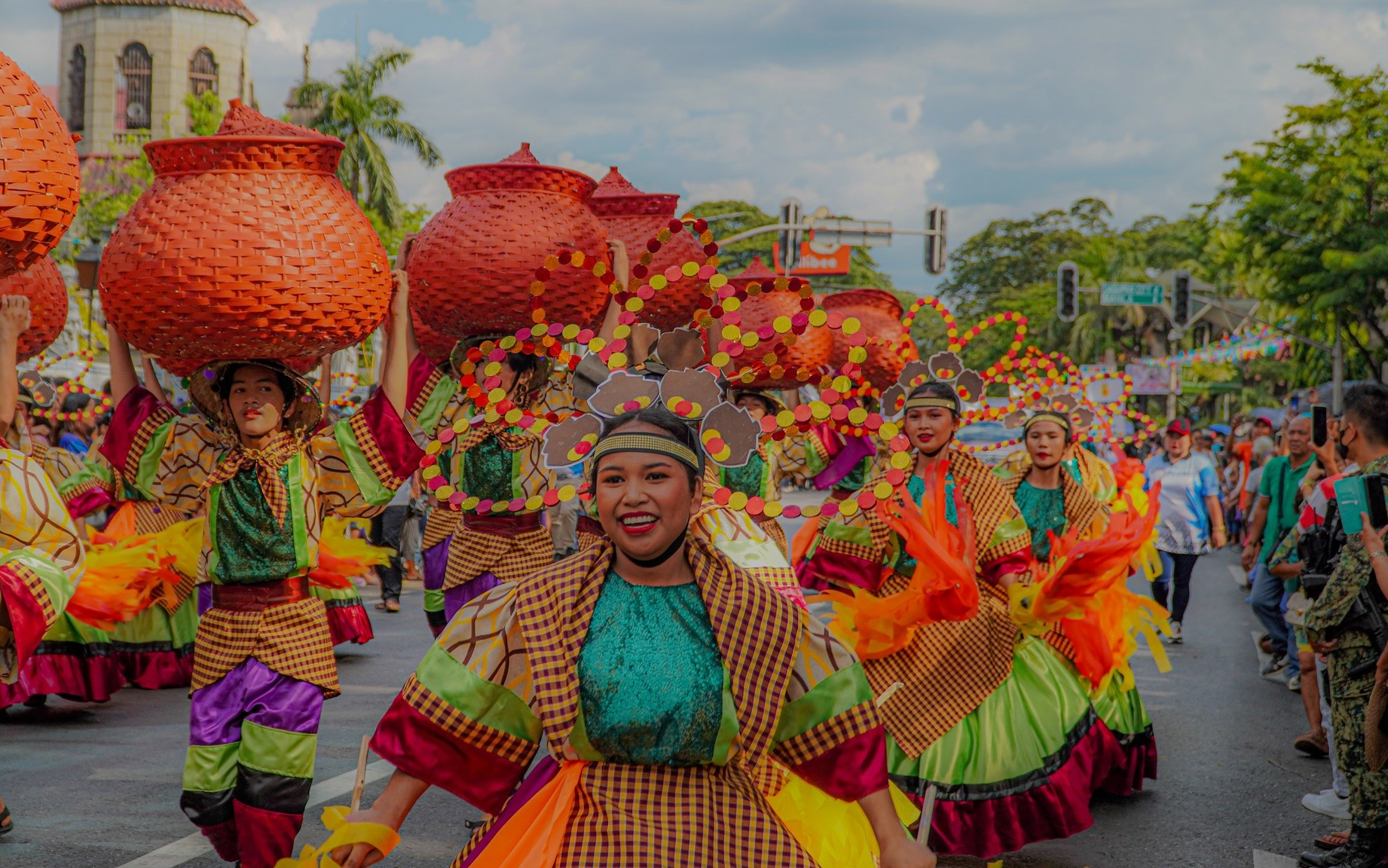
Dinengdeng Festival in Agoo

Dinengdeng Festival - The Dinengdeng Festival is the official annual festivity of Agoo, celebrated in the summer. The festival is named after dinengdeng, an Ilocano vegetable-based dish traditionally cooked in a banga (clay pot). The festival honors this dish and the agricultural heritage of the town. Sillag Festival - The Sillag Festival, also known as the Poro Point Festival of Lights, is held during the summer in La Union. Sillag means "moonbeam" or "illumination" in Iloco, and the festival features various light displays and activities that start at sunset, showcasing the beauty of Poro Point.

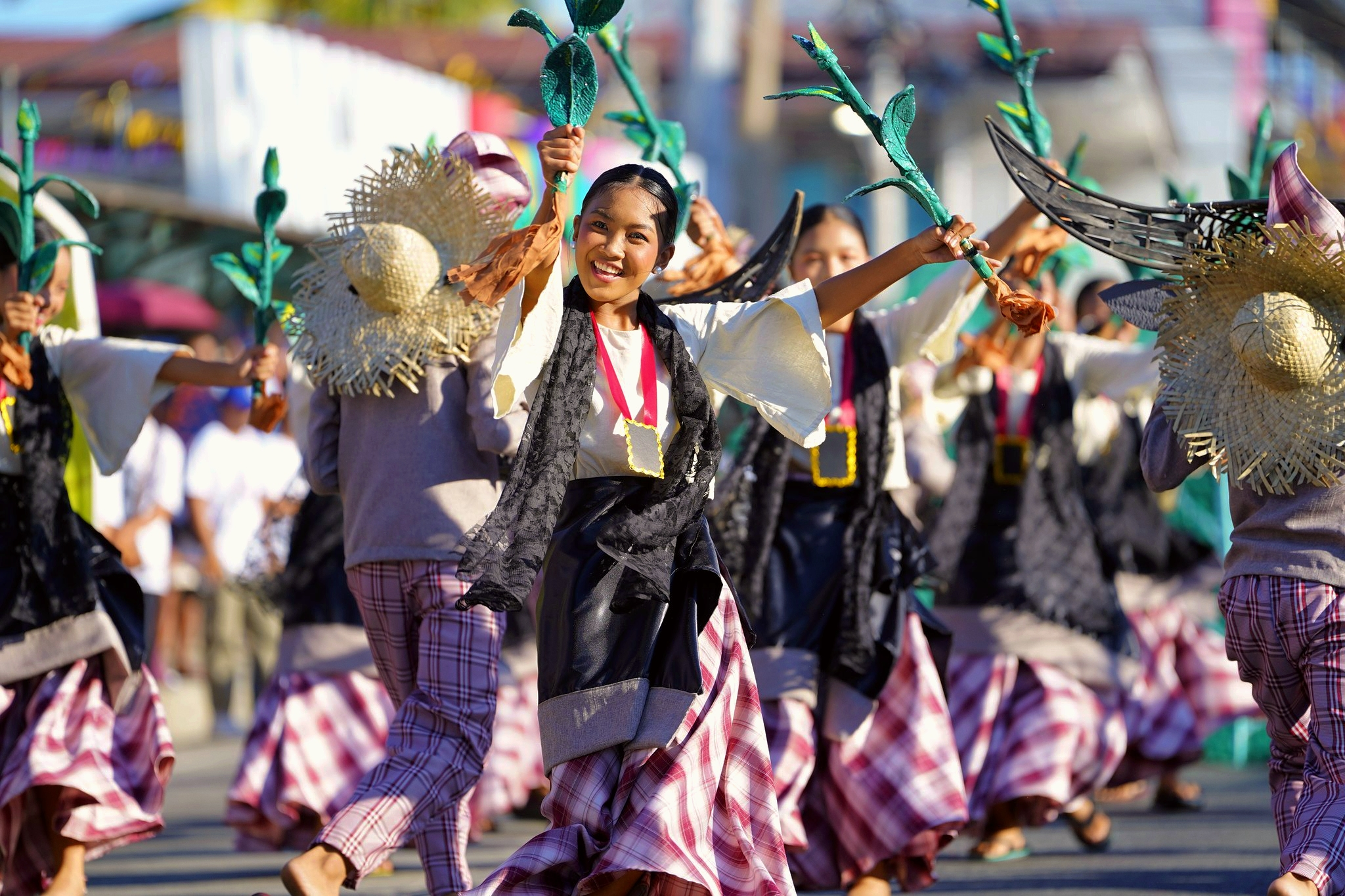
Panagyaman Festival in Balaoan

Panagyaman Festival - The Panagyaman Festival celebrates a bountiful harvest and is a five-day event held annually from 18 December in Balaoan. The Iloco term panagyaman means "thanksgiving," emphasizing the community’s gratitude for a bountiful harvest. Pindangan Festival - The Pindangan Festival commemorates the founding anniversary of San Fernando as a city, ratified on 20 March 1998. The term pindangan is the former name of the city refers to a place where meat was traditionally sun-dried. The festival highlights this preservation method and the town’s historical roots.

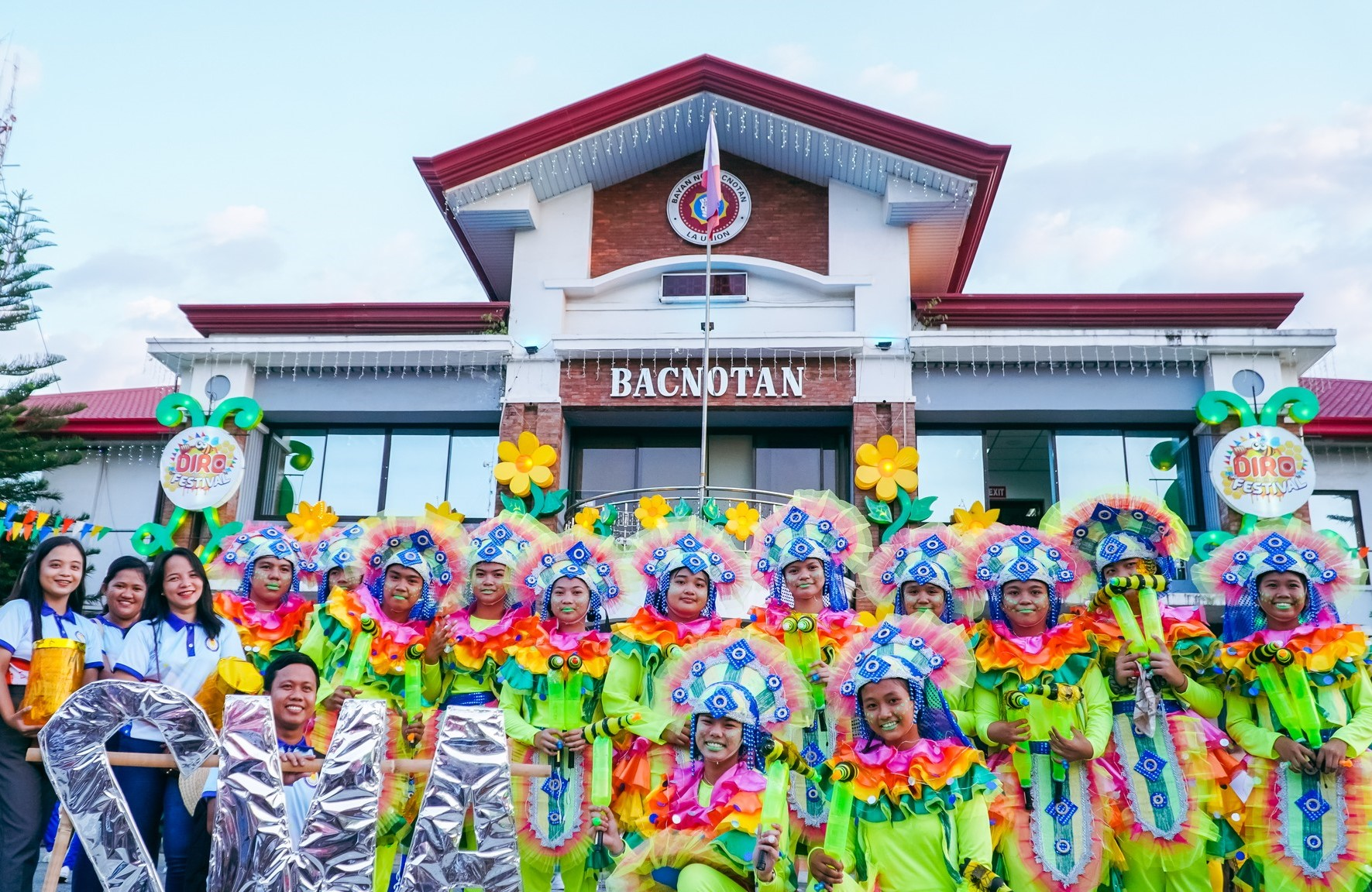
Diro Festival in Bacnotan

Diro Festival - The Diro Festival celebrates the honey industry in Bacnotan, as diro is the Iloco word for honey. The festival symbolizes unity and oneness within the community, and it features a float parade, cultural performances, and giveaways for residents. Tinungbo Festival - The Tinungbo Festival is held annually in Pugo, named after the traditional cooking method of tinungbo, which involves grilling rice and local delicacies in bamboo tubes over a low fire. This festival celebrates the town’s culinary heritage and indigenous practices.

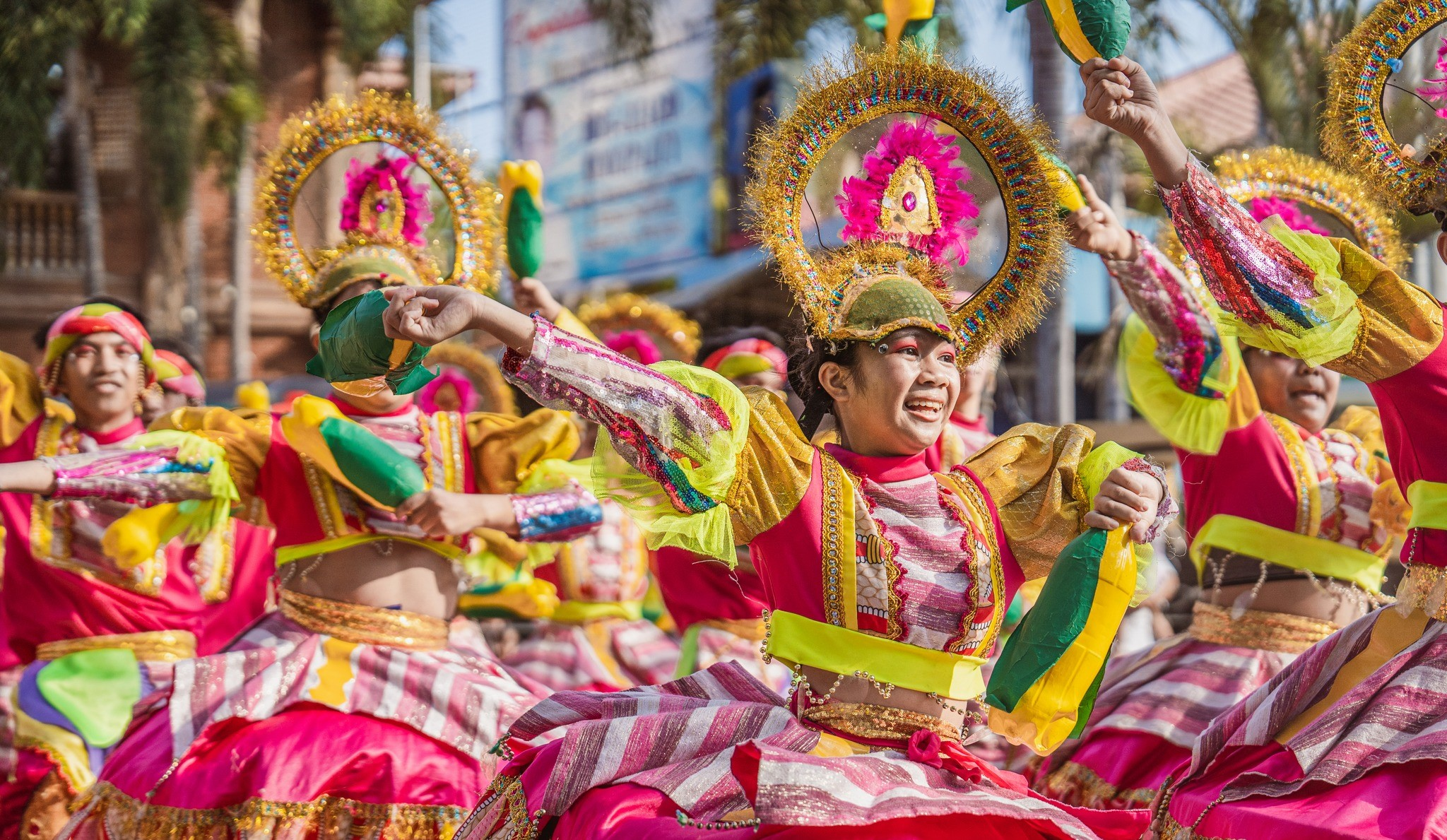
Danggayan Festival in San Juan

Danggayan Festival - The Danggayan Festival in San Juan showcases the town’s cultural heritage and spirit of unity. Danggayan means "togetherness" in Iloco, and the festival emphasizes collaboration and community through various activities and performances. Baggak Festival - Held every January, the Baggak Festival celebrates Bauang's cultural diversity and unity. The term baggak means "morning star" in Iloco, symbolizing the dawn of a new day. The festival features parades, street dancing, and cultural performances.

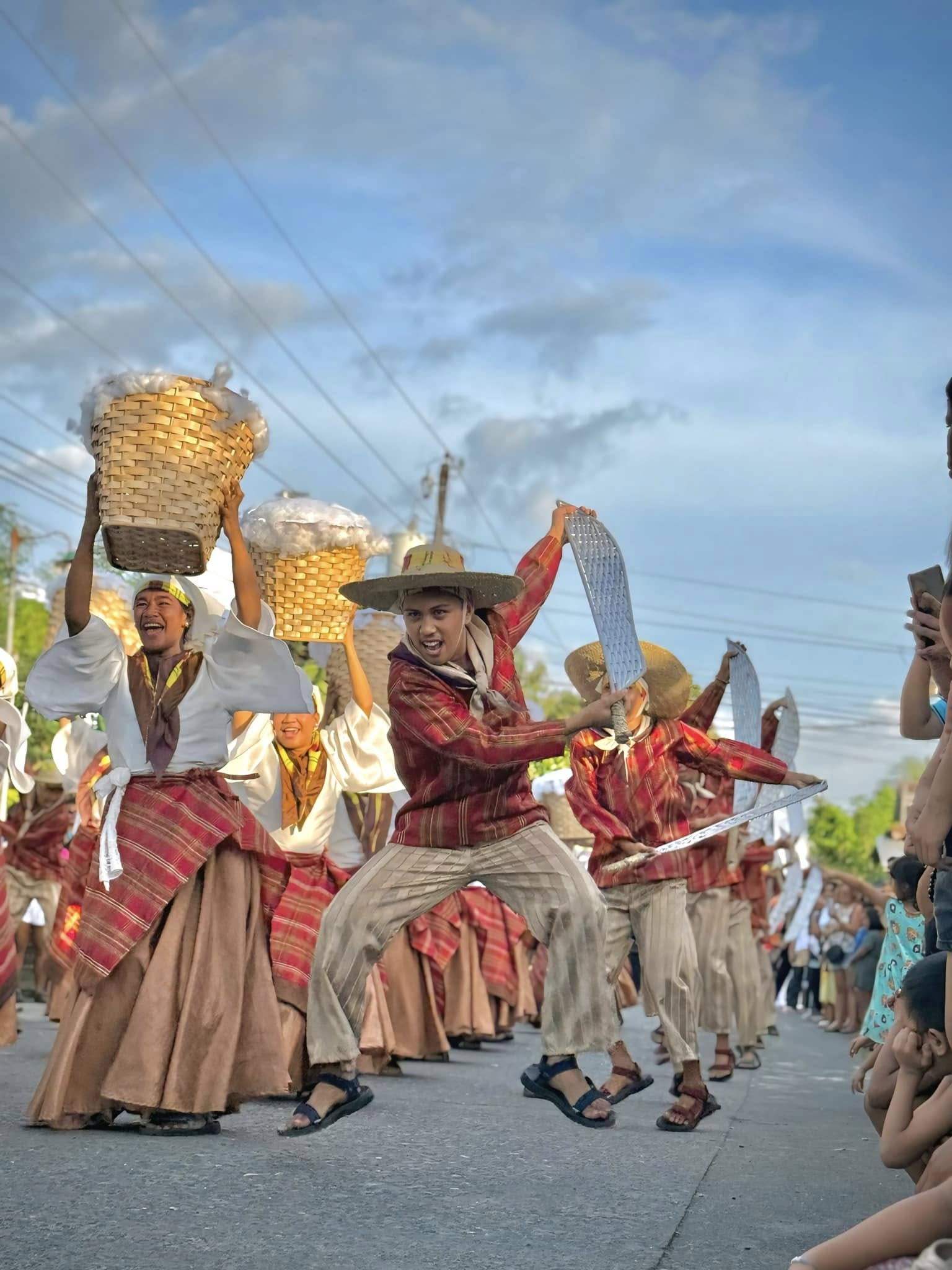
Abel-Panday Festival 2024 in Bangar

Abel-Panday Festival - The Abel-Panday Festival is a two-day celebration held every 26 and 27 December in Bangar. It honors the local products abel (woven fabric) and panday (blacksmithing), which are integral to the town's craftsmanship and cultural identity. Daing Festival - The Daing Festival in Santo Tomas celebrates the town’s renowned dried fish industry, particularly daing (sun-dried fish). Held every 20 April, this festival is followed by the town’s annual fiesta on 24–25 April, highlighting the town’s local trade and exports.

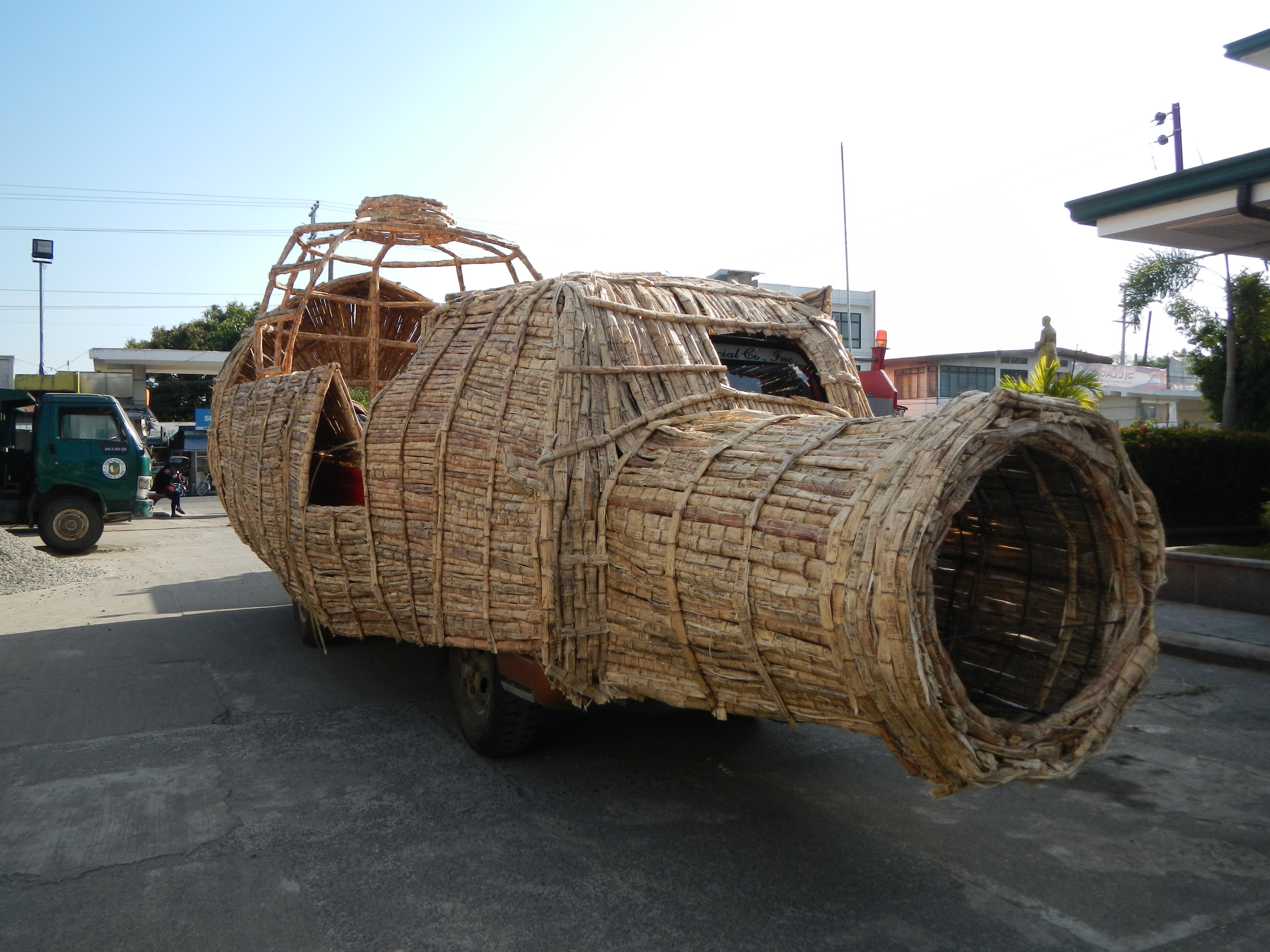
Basi Festival float made from sugarcane stalk

Basi Festival - The Basi Festival is held every third week of February in Naguilian to celebrate basi, a traditional Ilocano wine made from sugarcane. The festival features street dancing, sports events, an agri-trade fair, and other amusement games, promoting basi as a local product.

Tabako Festival - The Tabako Festival in Tubao, held every second week of May, celebrates the town’s tobacco industry, a testament to the resilience of Ilocano farmers. The festival highlights the harvest of premium tobacco cigars, enjoyed by both local and foreign smoking enthusiasts.

Mais Festival - The Mais Festival in Tubao celebrates the town’s abundant corn harvest, reflecting the resilience, hard work, and rich cultural heritage of its people. Held every second week of May, the festival honors the victory and prosperity of the town’s farmers, showcasing the importance of corn to the community’s way of life.

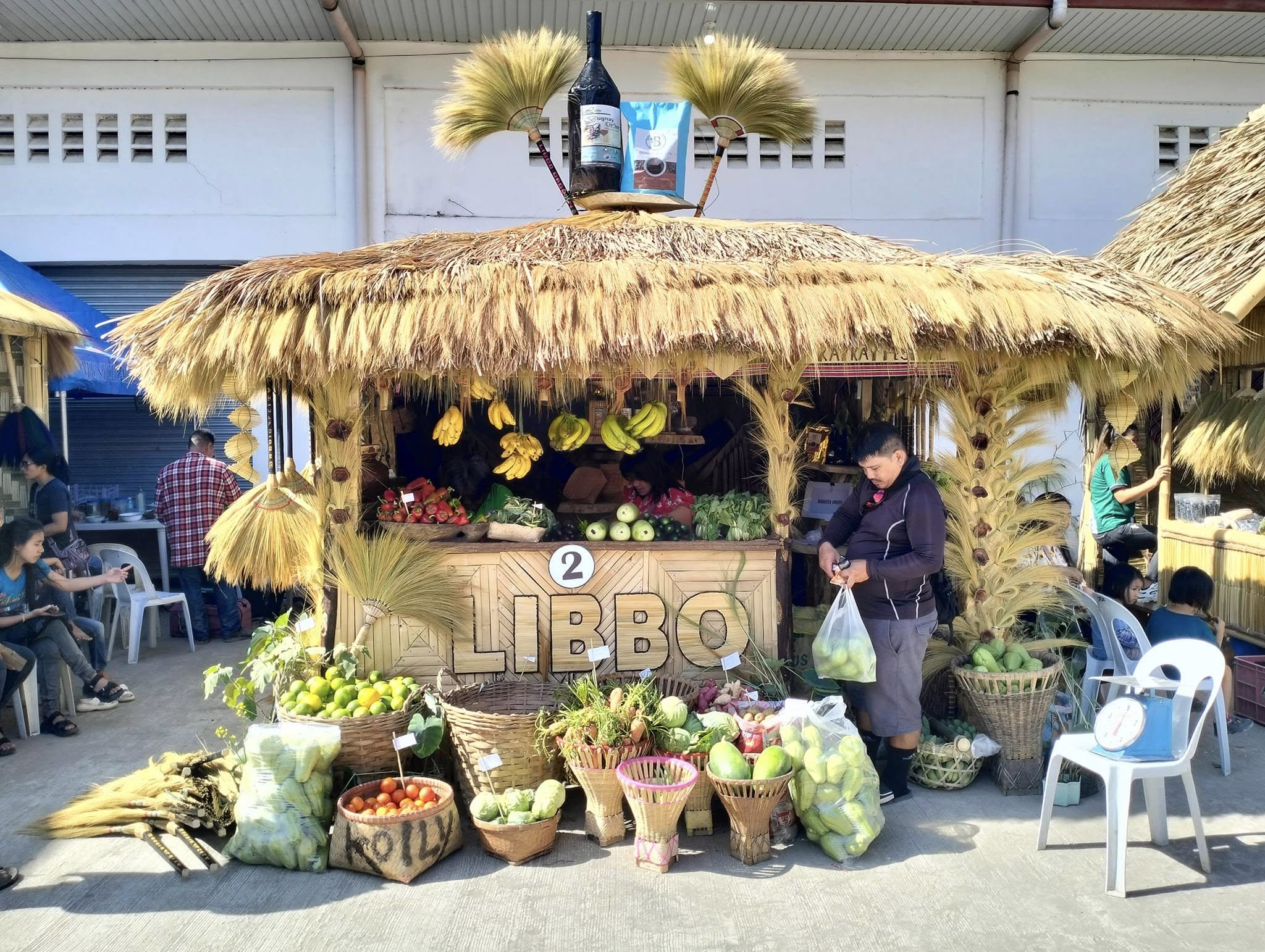
Kaykay festival tiger grass booth in Burgos.

Kaykay Festival - Kaykay Festival is a week-long celebration on the month of March in the municipality of Bagulin, that includes a sportsfeast, mural painting competition, and IP dance competition.

Buyboy Festival - is a celebration of the municipalities' town fiesta showcasing their major produce "buyboy" or tiger grass during the month of February. This raw material is made into the soft brooms and other decorative items. Featured is a civic parade, trade fair and handicraft exhibition. Cultural performances can also be seen during this time. They are also known for its colored soft broom.

La Union Foundation Anniversary Celebrations - The La Union Foundation Anniversary celebrations are held annually around March to mark the formation of the province in 1850. One of the highlights of this event is the Mutia ti La Union (Miss La Union) contest, showcasing the beauty and talent of local women. In the 174th anniversary celebrations, Governor Raphaelle Veronica Ortega-David led the Second La Union Hot Air Balloon Show at Poro Point Baywalk in San Fernando, accompanied by other activities like a static display and car and drift shows.

== Government ==
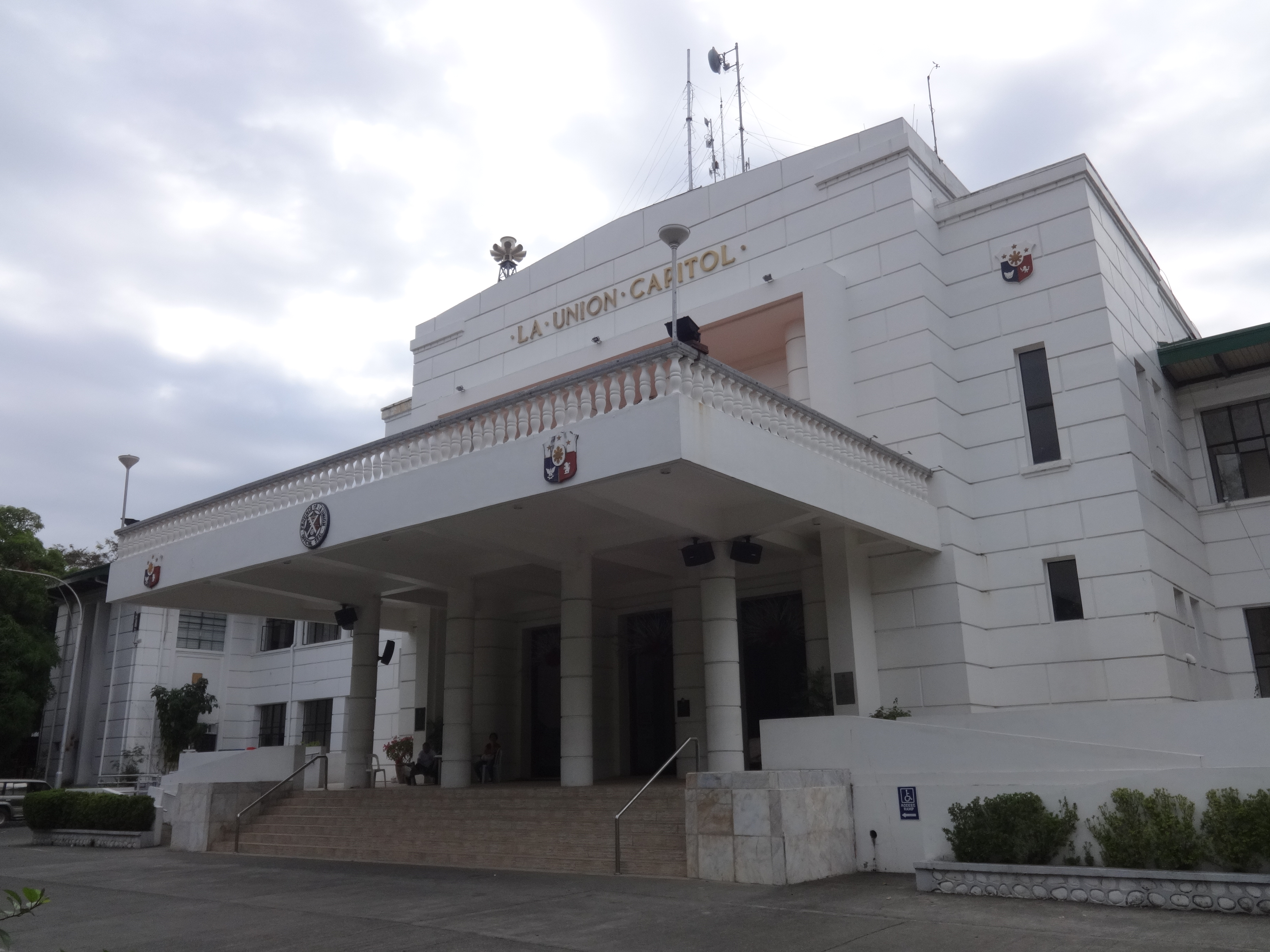
La Union Provincial Capitol

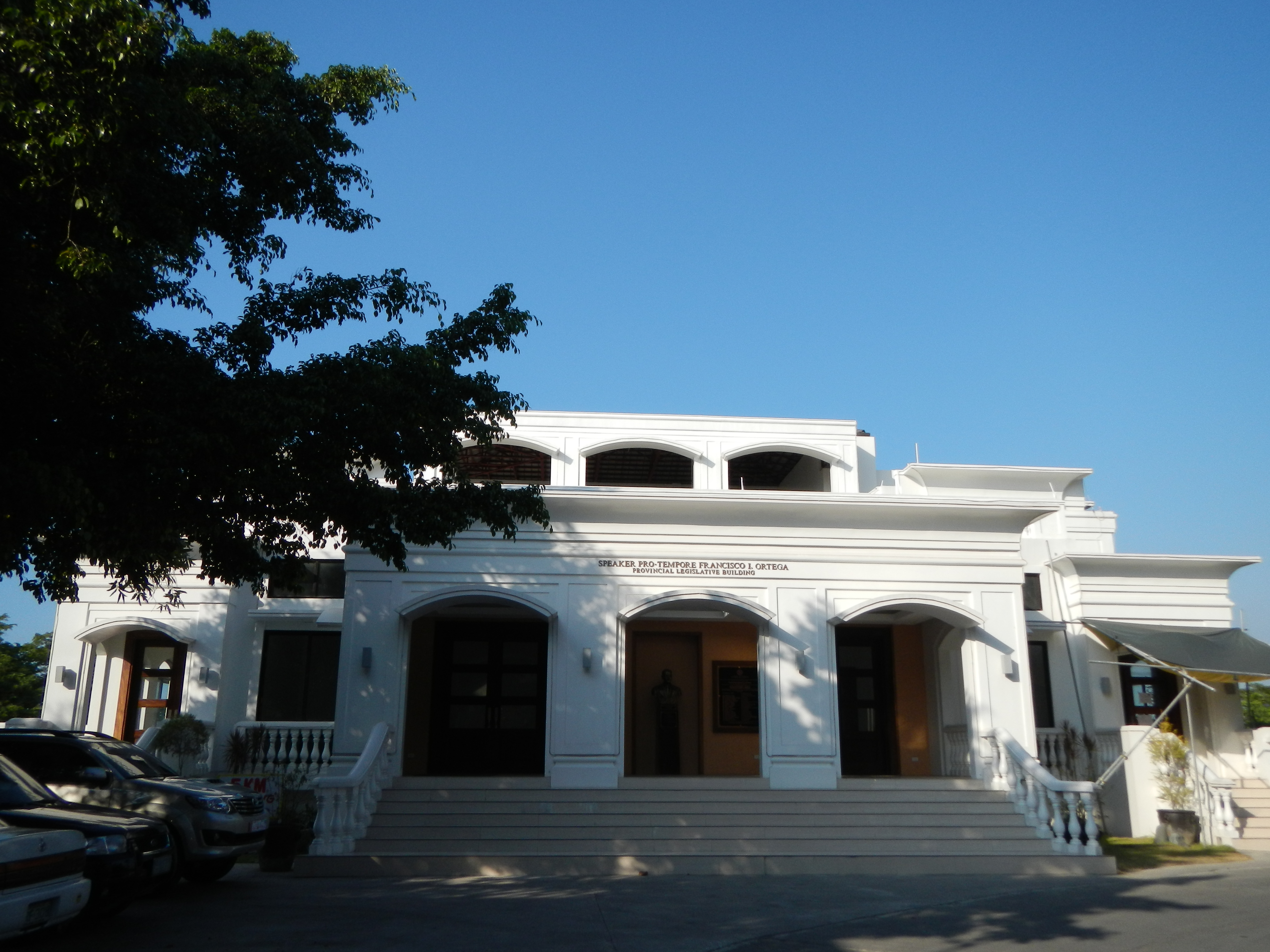
La Union Legislative Building

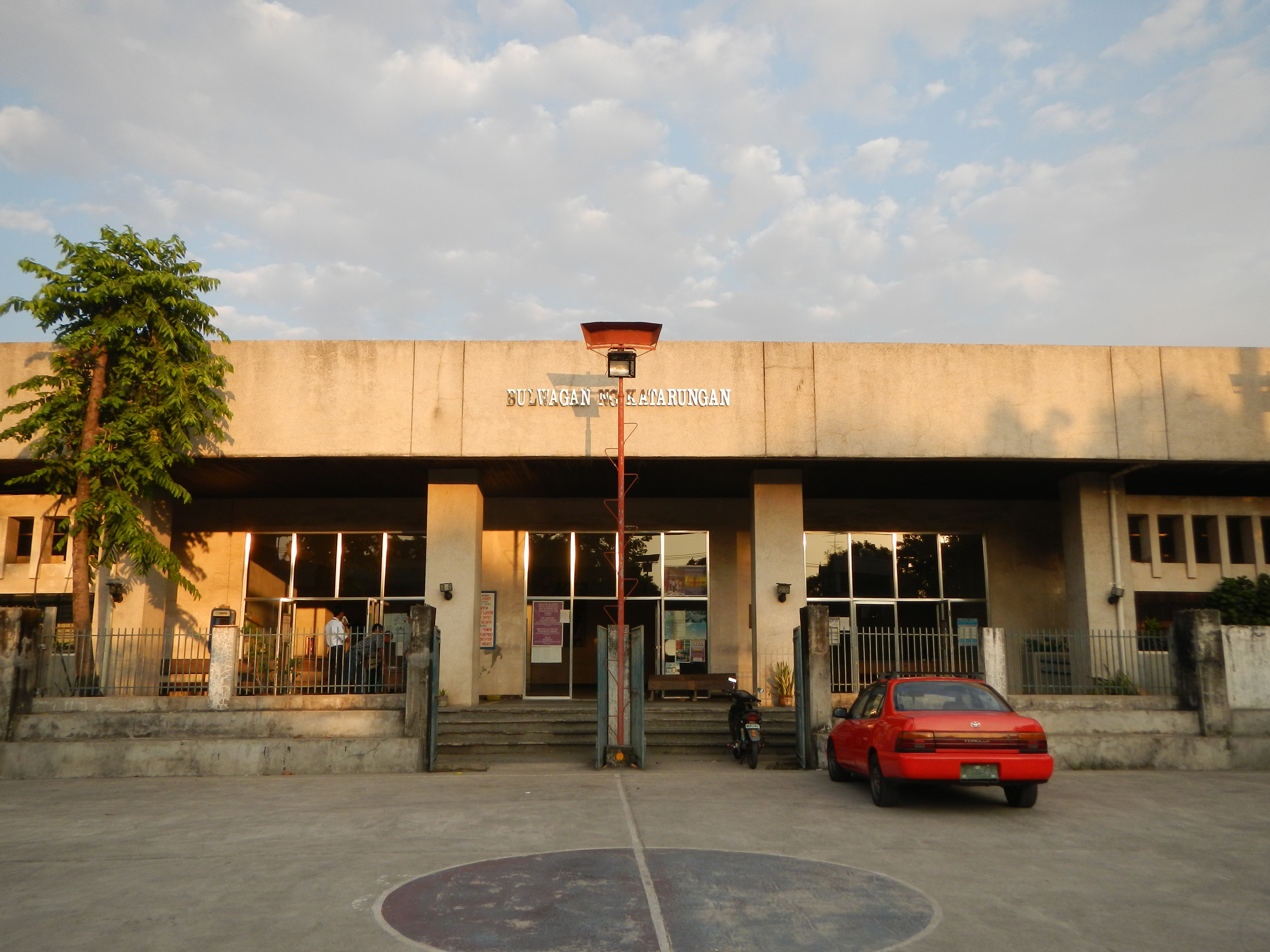
Bulwagan ng Katarungan (Regional Trial Courts, in San Fernando

Just as the national government, La Union provincial government is divided into three branches: executive, legislative, and judiciary. The judicial branch is administered solely by the Supreme Court of the Philippines. The Local Government Units (LGUs) have control of the executive and legislative branches.

The executive branch is composed of the governor for the provinces, the mayor for the cities and municipalities, and the Punong Barangay (Chairman) for the barangays.

The legislative branch is composed of the Sangguniang Panlalawigan (provincial assembly) for the provinces, Sangguniang Panlungsod (city assembly) for the cities, Sangguniang Bayan (town assembly) for the municipalities, Sangguniang Barangay (barangay council), and the Sangguniang Kabataan for the youth sector.

The seat of government is vested upon the mayor and other elected officers who hold office at the City Hall of San Fernando. The Sangguniang Bayan is the center of legislation, stationed in the Speaker Pro-Tempore Francisco I. Ortega Building, the Legislative Building at the back of the Capitol.

=== Elected Officials ===
La Union is governed by Mario Eduardo C. Ortega, the chief executive, his vice governor, Eric O. Sibuma, and 13 board members. The La Union has two congressional district represents by two congressman Francisco Paolo Ortega for the First Congressional District and Dante S. Garcia for Second Congressional District.

Current Provincial Government Officials (2025-2028)

- Governor: Mario Eduardo C. Ortega (PFP)
- Vice-Governor: Eric O. Sibuma (Lakas)

Sangguniang Panlalawigan Members

1st District

- Maria Rosario Eufrosina P. Nisce (Lakas)
- Miguel Corleone B. Magsaysay (Independent)
- Gerard G. Ostrea (Lakas)
- Aaron Kyle M. Pinzon (Lakas)
- Ernesto V. Rafon (Independent)

2nd District

- Alyssa Kristine B. Sibuma (Lakas)
- Teresita O. Garcia (Lakas)
- Eulogio Clarence Martin P. De Guzman (Lakas)
- Ruperto Rillera Jr. (Lakas)
- Jefferson B. Fernando (Lakas)

Ex-Officio Members

- Ramon Guio Ortega (President, Liga ng mga Barangay)
- Pablo C. Ortega (President, PCL)
- Harold Dave Sibuma (President, Panlalawigang Pederasyon ng Sangguniang Kabataan)
- Joyce Abuan (Representative, IPMR)

==== District Representatives ====
District	Representative	Party	Term	Bloc
1st	Francisco Paolo P. Ortega V	Lakas	2	Majority
2nd	Dante S. Garcia	Lakas	1	Majority

=== Court System ===
The Supreme Court of the Philippines recognizes La Union (inter alia) regional trial courts and metropolitan or municipal trial courts within the province and towns that have an overall jurisdiction in the populace of the province and towns, respectively.

Batas Pambansa Blg. 129, "The Judiciary Reorganization Act of 1980", as amended, created Regional, Metropolitan, Municipal Trial and Circuit Courts. The Third Judicial Region includes Regional Trial Courts in La Union xxx Sec. 14. Regional Trial Courts. (a) Fifty-seven Regional Trial Judges shall be commissioned for the First Judicial Region. Nine branches (Branches XXVI to XXXIV) for the province of La Union, Branches XXVI to XXX with seats at San Fernando City, Branches XXXI and XXXII at Agoo, Branch XXXIII at Bauang, and Branch XXXIV at Balaoan;

The law also created Metropolitan Trial Courts in each metropolitan area established by law, a Municipal Trial Court in each of the other cities or municipalities, and a Municipal Circuit Trial Court in each circuit comprising such cities and/or municipalities as are grouped together pursuant to law: three branches for Cabanatuan City; in every city which does not form part of a metropolitan area, there is also a Municipal Trial Court with one branch, except as provided: Two branches for San Fernando, La Union;

The courts of law are stationed in Halls of Justices of the Province and towns. In La Union, the Regional Trial Court is stationed at the Bulwagan ng Katarungan or Halls of Justice in San Fernando, La Union and other Regional Trial Courts in Bauang and Agoo, La Union.

== Education ==
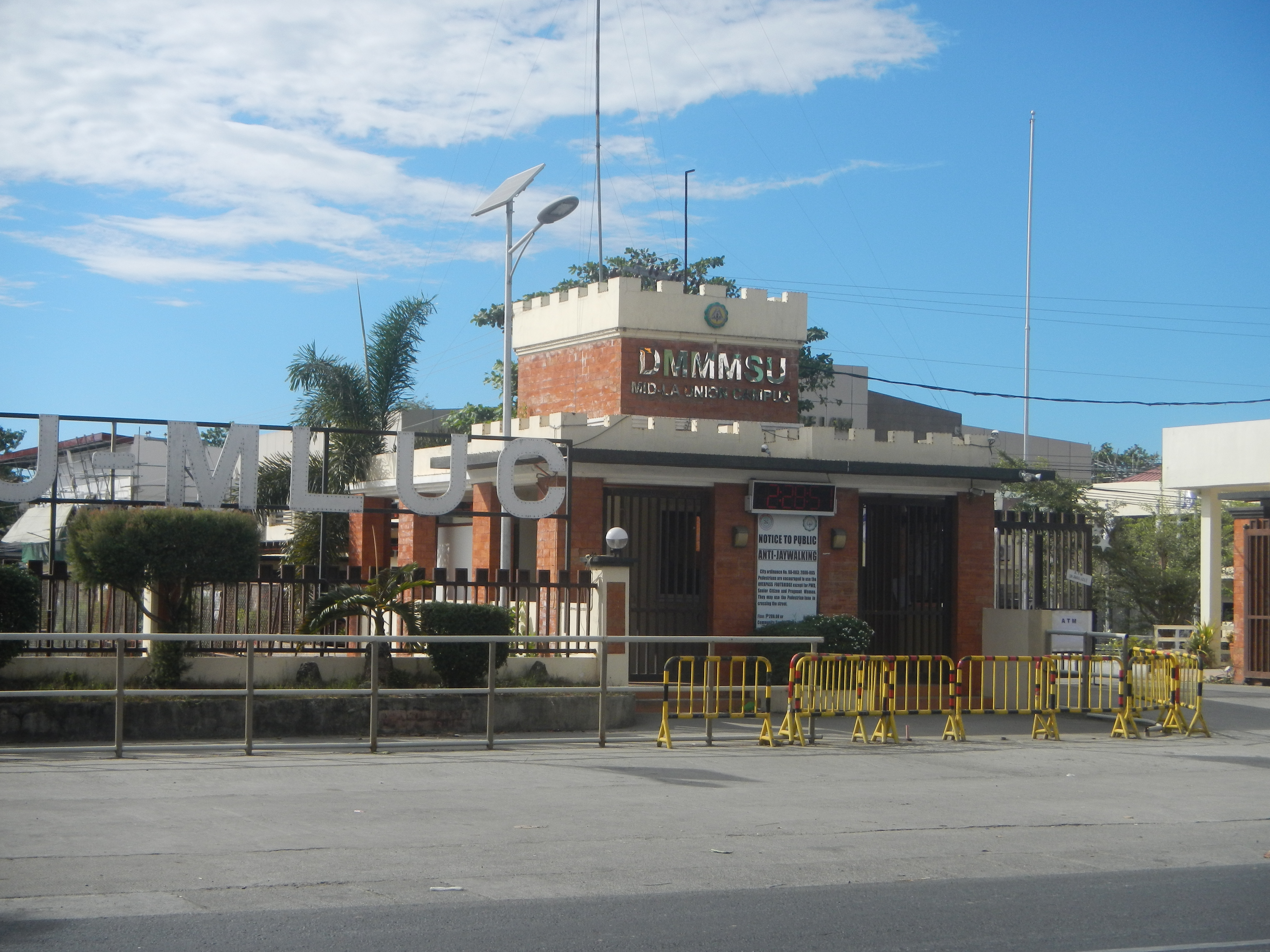
DMMMSU-Mid La Union Campus

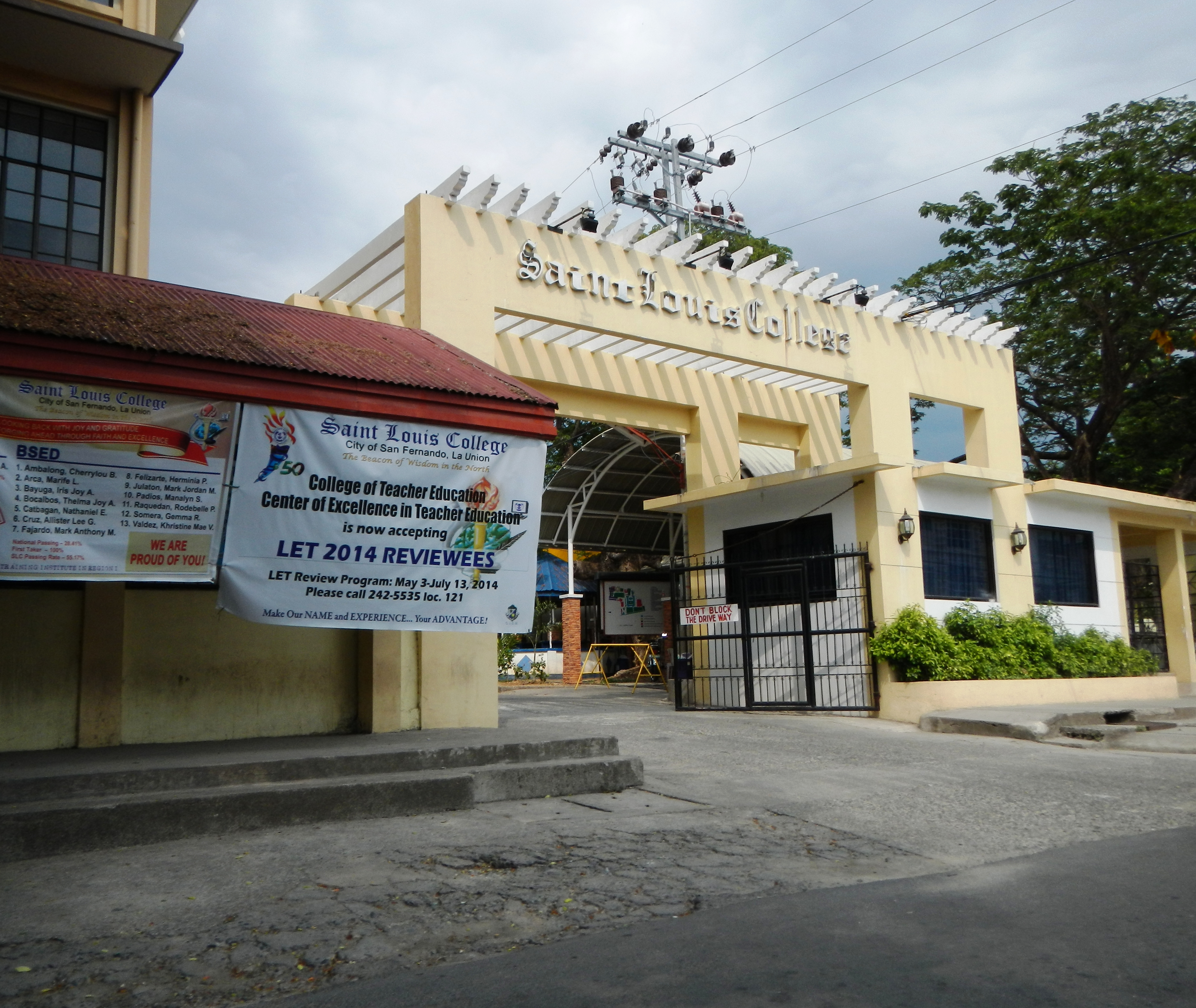
Saint Louis College, La Union

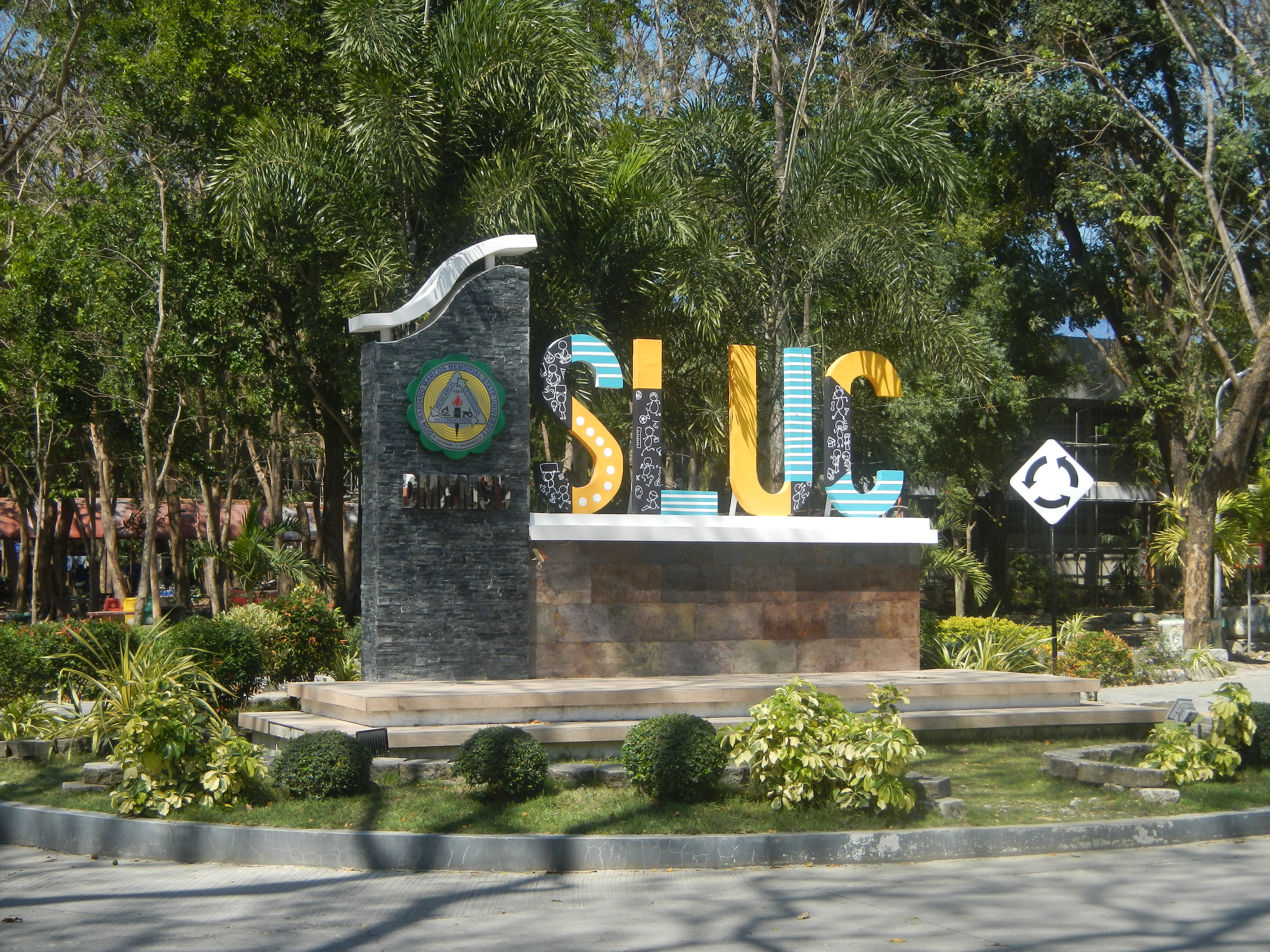
DMMMSU-South La Union Campus

As of 2022, based on the Department of Education (DepEd) Masterlist of Schools for School Year 2021-2022, La Union has a total of 413 educational institutions. These include 325 public and 27 private elementary schools, 13 public and 1 private secondary schools offering purely secondary education (Junior and Senior High School), and 28 public and 2 private integrated schools providing both elementary and secondary education (Junior and Senior High School) under the K to 12 Basic Education Curriculum.

In addition to these, the province is home to 14 private colleges and 1 state university with 4 campuses, all administered by the Commission on Higher Education (CHED). The literacy rate in La Union among the household population aged 10 years and older was recorded at 99.0% in 2020, with a slightly higher rate among males (50.4%) compared to females (49.6%).

Historically, education in La Union dates back to the Spanish colonial period, following the 1863 reforms that introduced primary schools for boys and girls. In 1901, the American administration established the Philippine public school system through Act No. 74. This system, with its superior infrastructure and resources, was widely embraced by communities and became a vital driver of social and economic progress in the province.

Universities:

- Don Mariano Marcos Memorial State University
  - Don Mariano Marcos Memorial State University-North La Union Campus (Bacnotan)
  - Don Mariano Marcos Memorial State University-Mid La Union Campus (City of San Fernando)
  - Don Mariano Marcos Memorial State University-South La Union Campus (Agoo)
  - Don Mariano Marcos Memorial State University-East La Union Campus (Naguilian)
  - Don Mariano Marcos Memorial State University-Open University System (City of San Fernando)

Colleges:

- Saint Louis College La Union
- Union Christian College
- AMA Computer College – La Union Campus
- LORMA Colleges
- CICOSAT Colleges
- Northern Philippines College for Maritime Science and Technology
- STI College La Union
- Saint John Bosco College of Northern Luzon
- Sea and Sky Colleges
- La Finn's Scholastica
- Sta. Veronica Colleges
- South Ilocandia College of Arts and Technology
- La Union College of Science and Technology
- La Union Christian Comprehensive College
- Agoo Computer Colleges
- Polytechnic College of La Union
- Philippine Central College of Arts, Science and Technology

== Notable people ==
=== Leaders and Politicians ===
- Diego Silang (16 December 1730 – 28 May 1763) – Filipino Revolutionary
- Joaquin Luna (11 December 1864 – 7 November 1936) was a Filipino revolutionary and former La Union governor from 1901-1908.
- Anacleto Diaz (1878–1945) – 31st Associate Justice of the Supreme Court of the Philippines
- Magnolia Antonino (1915–2010) – former Senator of the Philippines
- Manuel Arguilla (1911–1944) – writer, patriot, and martyr
- Jose D. Aspiras – 1st Secretary of the Department of Tourism and former congressman
- Camilo Osias (1889–1976) – Filipino politician, 6th and 8th President of the Senate of the Philippines.
- Fortunato Abat (1925–2018) – 20th Secretary of the Department of National Defense (DND), Ambassador to the People's Republic of China, and Commanding General of the Philippine Army.
- Armando "Mandrake" Ducusin Palabay (1953–1974) - Filipino student leader and activist from San Fernando La Union, honored at the Philippines' Bantayog ng mga Bayani as a martyr of the resistance against the Marcos dictatorship.
- Rolando Joselito Bautista – retired Filipino lieutenant general and 26th Secretary of Social Welfare and Development
- Rafael Buenaventura – Governor of the Bangko Sentral ng Pilipinas
- Samuel Gaerlan – 187th Associate Justice of the Supreme Court of the Philippines
- Mario Lopez — 185th Associate Justice of the Supreme Court of the Philippines
- Antonio Mabutas – Agoo-born first bishop of Diocese of Laoag and the second Archbishop of the Archdiocese of Davao, historically noted as the first Roman Catholic Archbishop to write a pastoral letter to criticize human rights violations under the Marcos dictatorship.
- Doña Laureana Novicio Luna y Ancheta (4 July 1836 – 18 August 1906) — Mother of Antonio Luna and Juan Luna.
- Wenceslao Padilla – Filipino Scheut priest who from 2 August 2003 was the Apostolic prefect of the Apostolic Prefecture of Ulaanbaatar, a diocese of the Roman Catholic Church in Mongolia.
- Jessica Soho — Multi-awarded (Asia Journalist of All Times, Peabody Award) Filipina broadcast journalist dubbed as the Asia's Powerhouse Journalist and known as the host of the news magazine program Kapuso Mo, Jessica Soho on GMA Network and formerly anchored the newscast State of the Nation with Jessica Soho on GMA News TV.

=== National Artists and National Scientists ===
- Lucrecia Roces Kasilag (1918 2008) – National Artist of the Philippines for Music
- Bienvenido Nebres (born 1940) – academic, National Scientist of the Philippines for Mathematics, former Provincial Superior of the Society of Jesus in the Philippines
- Clare R. Baltazar (1927-2024) – National Scientist of the Philippines for Systematic Entomology

=== Entertainment ===
- Vice Ganda – Comedian, actor, singer, and host, from San Juan, La Union.
- Gloria Diaz (born 1951) – Miss Philippines 1969, Miss Universe 1969, Actress, from Aringay, La Union.
- Bea Millan-Windorski – Miss Universe Philippines 2026, whose maternal grandparents are natives of San Juan, La Union.
- Noel Cabangon - Filipino guitarist, folk singer, composer from Rosario, La Union
- Edward Barber — Filipino-British actor and host who came to prominence in 2016 Pinoy Big Brother: Lucky 7, 4th placed. from Aringay, La Union.
- Cheska Garcia Kramer — is a Filipino actress and model from Bauang, La Union
- Vaness del Moral – Filipina actor, dancer and singer from San Juan, La Union.
- Coleen Garcia — is a Filipino actress, host, and model from the City of San Fernando, La Union.
- JB Magsaysay (born 1980) – Pinoy Big Brother (season 1) housemate; actor, public servant, and businessman. from San Juan, La Union.
- Ashley Ortega — is a Filipino-German actress well known for her roles in Dormitoryo and My Destiny on GMA Network. She is formerly a co-host of the variety show Wowowin. from the City of San Fernando, La Union.

=== Athletes ===
- Carlo Biado (born 1983) — Filipino Athlete and professional pool player "2021 US Open Pool Grand Champion". from Rosario, La Union.
- Roger Casugay — Filipino surfer who competed for the Philippines at the 2019 Southeast Asian Games gold medalist. He is the first Filipino to receive the Pierre de Coubertin Act of Fair Play Award of the International Fair Play Committee in recognition of saving a competitor in longboard semifinals of the 2019 Southeast Asian Games. from the City of San Fernando, La Union.
- José B. Nísperos — (1887–1922) First Asian and Filipino to win US Medal of Honor
- Tyler Tio — (born 1998) Filipino-Canadian professional basketball player of the Philippine Basketball Association (PBA) from San Fernando, La Union.
- Rhenz Abando — (born 1998) Professional basketball player who last played for the Anyang Jung Kwan Jang Red Boosters of the Korean Basketball League (KBL) from Santo Tomas, La Union.
- James Sena — (born 1988) is a Filipino professional basketball player from Agoo, La Union.
